= The Dutch House =

The Dutch House may refer to:

- The Dutch House (Brookline, Massachusetts), a building in Brookline, Massachusetts
- The Dutch House, Bristol, a demolished building in Bristol, England
- The Dutch House, York, a building in York, England
- The Dutch House (novel), a 2019 novel by Ann Patchett

== Other uses ==
- Dutch house, a style of the electro house music genre that originated in the Netherlands
- Dutch House (New Castle, Delaware), a late-17th-century house in New Castle, Delaware
- Dutch Houses, Chester, a building in Chester, England
