= Grade II listed buildings in Chester (central) =

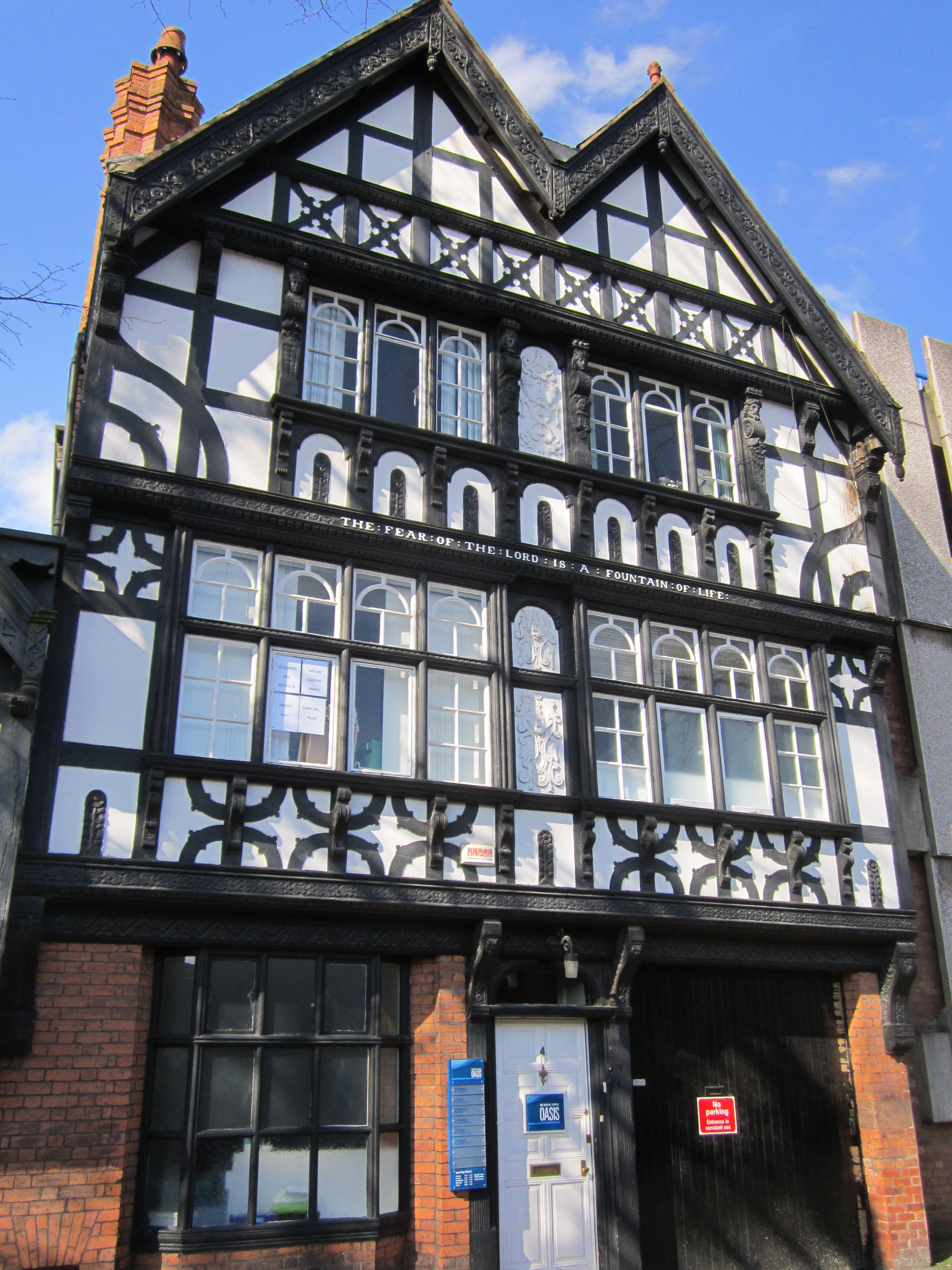
4 Park Street, one of Chester's many Grade-II-listed Black-and-white Revival buildings

Chester is a city in Cheshire, England containing over 650 structures that are designated as listed buildings by English Heritage and included in the National Heritage List for England. Of these, over 500 are listed at Grade II, the lowest of the three gradings given to listed buildings and applied to "buildings of national importance and special interest". This list contains the Grade II listed buildings in the central unparished area of the city within Chester city walls or located adjacent to them.

Chester contains listed buildings dating back to the Roman conquest of Britain, when the city was the major fortress in the northwest of England, known as Deva Victrix, and a port on the River Dee. During this time northern section of the city walls was built, and the four main roads, which survive to the present, were created. After the Romans left Britain, the city went into decline, and many of the buildings became ruinous. The city became important again following the Norman conquest and Chester Castle was built. Following this the city walls were extended to the south. As the lowest crossing point on the Rived Dee, it was of strategic importance, particularly in the campaigns against the Welsh. During this time it was also a market town, and there was much domestic building, including the creation of the Chester Rows, where there are two levels of pedestrian walkway, one at street level, and one at a higher level under cover. Chester was involved in the Civil War, when the city was besieged, and many buildings were damaged. Following this, the city prospered and, despite the closing of the port due to silting of the river, there was much building and rebuilding during the 17th and 18th centuries. Initially the new buildings were timber-framed and later they were in local sandstone or brick, and sections of the rows were enclosed and incorporated into some of the buildings. In 1779 the Chester Canal, later part of the Shropshire Union Canal, opened, bringing opportunities for more industry to the city. About this time, and in the earlier part of the 19th century, a number of Neoclassical buildings were erected, and the Grosvenor Bridge was built over the River Dee, providing an alternative road bridge to the medieval and narrow Old Dee Bridge. In the middle of the century there was a reaction against the Georgian and Neoclassical style of architecture, and Chester was at the forefront of the Black-and-white Revival, reintroducing timber-framed buildings into the city. The 20th century brought some Modernist buildings into the city, and later in the century there was a growing interest in conservation, when a number of dilapidated older buildings were repaired and restored.

This list includes structures from all phases of Chester's historical heritage, other than from the Roman era, which are listed in the higher grades. Many of the buildings in the town retain medieval fabric, some in small amounts, and others with more substantial material, mainly in the four main ancient roads. An example is St Nicholas Chapel, which originally dates from around 1300. There are timber-framed buildings, and timber-framed buildings that were later encased in brick. Examples include the Old Custom House Inn, Nine Houses, Ye Olde Edgar and Stanley Palace. A large number of Georgian houses have survived, particularly in King Street and Castle Street, as well in the main roads. Examples include Park House and 10–28 Nicholas Street. There are some examples of Neoclassical buildings, such as Chester City Club. A large number of buildings from the Black-and-white Revival are listed at Grade II. These include The Chester Grosvenor Hotel, 30 and 38 Bridge Street, 3, 11–13, 15–17 and 19 Northgate Street, and St Oswald's Chambers and St Werburgh's Mount on Werburgh Street. A few modern structures have been listed, including the former Odeon Cinema (1936) and Newgate (1937–38). One of the most recent listed buildings is Addleshaw Tower, a free-standing bell-tower of Chester Cathedral, built in 1973–75 in a Modernist style. Unusual listed structures include a scale model of Grosvenor Bridge, the War Memorial, a Cenotaph to Matthew Henry, a tombstone commemorating the soldier Thomas Gould, a sundial, a birdbath and two telephone kiosks.

== List ==
| Name and location | Photograph | Date | Notes |
|---|---|---|---|
| St Nicholas' Chapel; 53.19124°N 2.89117°W | | c. 1300 | This originated as a parish church and has since had a variety of uses, including being the Commonhall and Wool Hall, then a theatre and a music hall, a cinema, and a shop. It is built in sandstone and brick with a slate roof, and is in two storeys. The building is also a scheduled monument. |
| 21 Bridge Street, 25 Bridge Street Row; 53.18979°N 2.89128°W | | 14th century (probable) | The shop above the undercroft was rebuilt in about 1800, and altered in the 20th century. It is in four storeys, including the undercroft and a section of the Chester Rows. At street level is a modern shop front, and at the level of the rows is a railing with a stallboard behind. The upper storeys are in brick and contain sash windows with stone sills and wedge lintels. At the top of the building is a cornice and a low parapet. |
| 61 Bridge Street, 71 and 73 Bridge Street Row; 53.18878°N 2.89082°W | | 14th century | Originally probably two houses with undercrofts, they were rebuilt in about 1760 and later converted into shops. The building is in four storeys, including the undercrofts and a section of the Chester Rows. At street level there are modern shop fronts, and at the level of the rows is a balustrade and two Tuscan columns, with a stallboard behind. The upper storeys are in brick, and contain sash windows with rusticated wedge lintels. At the top of the building is a stone cornice and a brick parapet. |
| 13 and 15 Lower Bridge Street; 53.18821°N 2.89053°W | | 14th century (probable) | Originally a house with an undercroft, the upper parts were rebuilt probably in the late 17th century, and altered again in the following centuries. The undercroft is built in sandstone and brick, and the upper parts are in brick with a slate roof. The building is four storeys with a single-bay front. In the bottom storey is a modern shop front, and above are sash windows. At the top of the building is a gable with a parapet and stone coping. |
| 37 Bridge Street; 53.18930°N 2.89108°W | | Medieval | This consists of an undercroft that was refronted and lined internally in the 20th century. The rest of the building has been incorporated into neighbouring structures. |
| 17A Eastgate Street, 11 Eastgate Row; 53.19060°N 2.89055°W | | Medieval | A house with an undercroft mainly replaced in about 1800, altered in the 20th century and used as a shop. It is in four storeys, including a section of the Chester Rows, and has a single-bay front. At street level is a modern shop front, and at the level of the rows are steel railings and a stallboard. The upper storeys are in brick and each storey contains two sash windows. |
| 14 Lower Bridge Street; 53.18809°N 2.89090°W | | Medieval | Originally a house, refronted and partly rebuilt in the 18th century, and later used as a restaurant. It is built in sandstone and brick, is rendered, and has a slate roof. The building has four storeys, including the undercroft, and has a single-bay front. The ground floor contains a modern shop front, and in the storeys above are sash windows. |
| 15A Lower Bridge Street; 53.18807°N 2.89044°W | | Medieval | A shop and office, that was altered in the 18th century and later. It is in rendered brick with a slate roof, and has three storeys. The ground floor contains a modern shop front with a round headed porch to the right. This contains eleven steps leading up to a former portion of Chester Rows. The upper floors contain sash windows, and at the top of the building is a balustrade with a central panel containing a blank shield. |
| 53 Lower Bridge Street; 53.18734°N 2.89004°W | | Medieval | A small house, later used as a shop, that was altered in the early 18th and in the 19th centuries. It is partly timber-framed and partly in brick, and has a slate roof. The building is narrow and has three storeys. In the ground floor is a shop window and a door, and in the storeys above are sash windows. At the top is a gable decorated in brick and terracotta, and with a finial. The right side of the building shows features of its various stages of construction. |
| 48 and 50 Watergate Street; 53.19000°N 2.89360°W | | Medieval | A house with a medieval undercroft, later converted into a shop and office. It formerly included a section of the Chester Rows, but this was enclosed in the 18th century, and the building was refronted in the early 19th century. It is built in brick with a slate roof, and is in four storeys. At street level is a modern shop front, and a flight of steps leading up to the rows level, in which there is a sash window. In the third storey is a canted oriel window, and in the top storey are two sash windows. At the top of the house is a parapet with stone coping. |
| Cross, St Mary's Churchyard; 53.18623°N 2.89100°W | — | Medieval | A churchyard cross, the top being added in 1907. It is in sandstone, and consists of a square base with an inscription, an octagonal plinth, and an octagonal stem carved with a band of cherub-heads. Above this is the 20th-century part of the stem and a cross. |
| Wall, gates and railings, St Mary's Church; 53.18632°N 2.89149°W | — | Medieval | The gates and railings date from the 19th century. The wall is mainly sandstone, with some repairs in brick. The gate piers are also in stone, and are gabled. The gates and railings are in iron. |
| St Olave's Exhibition Centre; 53.18727°N 2.88996°W | | Mid-15th century (probable) | In 1849 the church was converted into a school by James Harrison and it was declared redundant in 1972. The building has since had a variety of uses. It is constructed in sandstone with slate roofs, and has a simple rectangular plan. On the west front is the entrance door, above which is a three-light window, and a bellcote on the gable. The forecourt walls, which are medieval in origin, and the railings are included in the listing. |
| 15 and 17 White Friars; 53.18848°N 2.89227°W | | Late medieval (probable) | Two houses, later altered and used as offices, they are in brick with a slate roof. The houses are in three storeys with cellars. Each house has a doorway with pilasters and a plain fanlight. The windows are sashes. |
| The Old House; 53.18861°N 2.89161°W | | Late medieval (probable) | The house was refurbished in 1658 and in the 1980s. It is timber-framed on a sandstone plinth and has a slate roof. There are two storeys and a cellar. In the ground floor is a doorway and two casement windows. The upper storey is jettied and has a decorative bressumer, plaster panels, some of which are pargeted, and above which is a continuous 14-light mullioned and transomed window. Over the window are two gables (one of which contains pargeting), bargeboards, and drop finials. |
| 90 and 92 Lower Bridge Street; 53.18639°N 2.88968°W | | 15th century (probable) | This originated as a house, and has been altered on a number of occasions. It has a timber-framed core, it was increased from two to three storeys and encased in brick in the 17th century, and was refronted in the 19th century. In the ground floor are windows and doors of a café. In the upper storeys are sash windows, and the roof is slated. |
| Chester High Cross; 53.19030°N 2.89163°W | | 1476 | The cross is in sandstone and all parts are octagonal. The head and possibly the shaft-base are original; the steps, plinth, shaft, and finial are modern. The head is badly weathered, and originally had niches containing statues. The cross was damaged in the Civil War but the head was saved. The cross was restored and reassembled in 1949, and it was moved to its present site in 1986. |
| Heritage Centre; 53.18865°N 2.89070°W | | 1496 | The originated as St Michael's Church, the oldest surviving part being the chancel. There was a rebuilding in 1582, and another in 1849–50 by James Harrison. The church was converted into a heritage centre in the 1970s. The former church is built in sandstone with a slate roof. Its plan consists of a nave, a north aisle, a chancel, and a west tower. On top of the tower is a crenellated parapet with eight crocketed pinnacles and a weathervane. |
| Ye Olde Edgar; 53.18646°N 2.88976°W | | 15th or 16th century | A timber-framed building with plaster panels, partly replaced in brick, with slate roofs. It was originally two houses, then converted into an inn, and back to two houses. It is in two storeys, the upper storey being jettied, and stands on a corner, with two gables facing each street. The windows are mullioned and transomed casements. |
| Stanley Palace; 53.18954°N 2.89566°W | | 1591 | Built as a town house, since the 18th century the building has had a variety of uses, and it was restored and partly rebuilt in 1935. It is timber-framed with plaster panels on a sandstone plinth, and has a slate roof. The building is in two storeys, the upper storey being jettied, and has a U-shaped plan. There are three gables on the north front, and four on the east front, all with finials. The windows are mullioned, or mullioned and transomed. |
| 44 Lower Bridge Street; 53.18746°N 2.89060°W | | 17th century or earlier | The front probably dates from 1717. The building originated as a house and has since had a number of uses. It is built in brick with stone dressings, and has a slate roof. There are four storeys, and the building has a two-bay front. In the ground floor is a modern shop front, and above there are two sash windows in each floor. The upper two storeys are flanked by rusticated quoins. At the top of the building is a parapet, behind which is a gable. |
| 22 Eastgate Street, 24, 26 and 28 Eastgate Row; 53.19040°N 2.89059°W | | 1610 | Originally a house with an undercroft, later used as a shop. It was altered in the 18th century, and refurbished in 1852 by T. M. Penson. The building is timber-framed with three storeys, including a section of Chester Rows, and is in a single bay. The ground floor contains a shop front, with a flight of nine steps to the right. At the rows level is a jettied kiosk, and in the top storey are two sash windows. The gable is jettied with an inscribed beam, moulded bargeboards and a finial. |
| 13 and 14 Abbey Square; 53.19240°N 2.89120°W | | 1626 | A pair of sandstone cottages, with some brick, and with slate roofs. They were created from the abbey kitchen by Bishop John Bridgeman for use of the vicars choral. They have slate roofs, and are in two storeys with gabled attics. The doorway to No. 13 has a gabled porch. The windows are casements. |
| Old Custom House Inn; 53.18970°N 2.89451°W | | 1637 | Originally two houses with undercrofts, the west house probably dating from the 18th century; they were later converted into a single public house. The former east house is in two storeys with an attic. The ground floor is in sandstone, and the upper parts are timber-framed, with an oriel window and a jettied gable. The west house has three storeys, with a rendered ground floor and brick above; the windows are sashes. |
| Nine Houses; 53.18841°N 2.88807°W | | c. 1650 | A terrace of six cottages, originally nine almshouses. They are in two storeys, and each cottage has a single-bay front. The bottom storey and side walls are in brick, the upper storey and gables are timber-framed and jettied. The windows are sashes, those in the lower storey being horizontally sliding, and those in the upper floor vertically sliding. |
| 20 Eastgate Street, 22 Eastgate Row; 53.19037°N 2.89065°W | | Mid-17th century | A shop with accommodation, altered in the 19th century, on the site of a house with an undercroft. It is a narrow building in four storeys, including a section of the Chester Rows. At street level is a modern shop front, and at the level of the row is a railing, behind which is a stallboard. The top two storeys are timber-framed and encased in brick, each storey containing a single sash window with a stone sill and wedge lintel. At the top of the building is a stone cornice. |
| 15 Abbey Street; 53.19273°N 2.88987°W | | 17th century (probable) | A brick house on a stone plinth with a slate roof. It is in three storeys, and has a front of three bays, and a rear wing. The front is almost symmetrical and contains a central doorway with pilasters, an architrave with a frieze and a cornice, and a fanlight. The windows are sashes with stone sills and wedge lintels. At the top of the house is a stone cornice. |
| 8 and 10 Bridge Street and Row; 53.19002°N 2.89170°W | | 17th century | A shop and office, partly timber-framed, partly stuccoed, and partly in brick, with a slate roof. It is in three storeys, incorporating a section of the Chester Rows, with a modern shop front at street level. At the level of the rows is a balustrade and a stallboard, above which is a row of quatrefoil panels. In the top storey are two windows. Above this is a jettied rendered gable, painted to resemble timber framing, with decorative bargeboards and a finial. |
| 14 Bridge Street, 12 and 12A Bridge Street Row; 53.18996°N 2.89165°W | | 17th century | An office built on the site of a medieval house with an undercroft, portions of which are sill present. It is in four storeys, including the undercroft and a section of the Chester Rows. At street level is a modern shop front, and at the level of the row are railings, behind which is a stallboard. The upper storeys are timber-framed and rendered, and contain sash windows. At the top of the building is a gable with bargeboards and a finial. |
| 59 Bridge Street, 67 and 69 Bridge Street Row; 53.18884°N 2.89087°W | | 17th century | Shops and living accommodation incorporating earlier fabric, altered in the 18th century, and refronted in the late 20th century. The building is in four storeys and an attic, incorporating a section of the Chester Rows in the first floor; it has a single-bay front, but extends back for four bays. On the ground floor is a modern shop front, and in the level of the rows are railings, above which are replaced sash windows. The building is flanked by brick pilasters. The interior has retained much of its 17th and 18th-century plan and furnishings. |
| 4 Duke Street; 53.18677°N 2.88927°W | | 17th century (probable) | Townhouse, altered in the 18th century and internally in the 20th century. The building is in three storeys with a cellar, double fronted, in brown brick. |
| 12 King Street; 53.19303°N 2.89385°W | | 17th century (probable) | A house with the front dating from the early 19th century, and restored in the 1970s. It is in brick on a rendered plinth and has a slate roof. The house is in three storeys and has a single-bay front. The doorway has fluted half-pilasters and a fanlight. The windows are sashes, and at the top of the house is a moulded cornice. |
| 28 and 30 King Street; 53.19303°N 2.89393°W | | 17th century (probable) | A pair of cottages, altered later, in painted brick with a slate roof. They are in 1 1/2 storeys. There is one sash window, and one fixed window, and the others are casements, those in the upper storey being in gabled half-dormers. On the west side is an added single-storey recessed extension. |
| 29 King Street; 53.19291°N 2.89499°W | | 17th century | A brick cottage in three storeys, with a single-storey wing at the rear. On the front, the bottom storey is rendered, and the upper storeys have applied timber-framing; the west gable is painted. The windows at the front of the house are sashes, one being horizontally sliding, and those at the rear are casements. |
| 23 and 25 White Friars; 53.18842°N 2.89274°W | | 17th century | Originally three houses, later converted into an office. The oldest section is part of No. 23; the rest dates from the 18th century. The building is in brick with slate roofs. The oldest part is in two storeys with a single bay and a gable. The newer part has three storeys and five bays. In the ground floor are two recessed bow windows and two doorways with fanlights. The other windows are sashes. |
| Golden Eagle Public House; 53.18705°N 2.89173°W | | 17th century | A public house incorporating material from an earlier house. It is built in brick on a stone plinth and has slate roofs. The public house is in two storeys with attics, and has a five-bay front with three gables. The gables have parapets and finials. The doorway has an architrave, a frieze and a pediment. The windows are sashes. |
| Victoria Public House; 53.19033°N 2.89177°W | | 17th century | Originally two houses with probable medieval undercrofts; the undercrofts were converted into two shops and above is a public house. The upper parts are timber-framed with brick cladding. The building is in four storeys, incorporating a section of Chester Rows. At street level are two modern shop fronts, and at the level of the rows are railings and two Tuscan columns. In the upper storeys are casement windows. |
| God's Providence House; 53.19013°N 2.89223°W | | 1652 | A house with an undercroft replacing a 13th-century house, it was largely rebuilt in 1862 by James Harrison. It is in four storeys, including the undercroft and a section of the Chester Rows, and has a front of one bay. At street level is a modern shop front, with a flight of steps up to the row on the right. At row level is a rail in Jacobean style, and the fascia above this has an inscription. The upper two storeys are timber-framed with decorated plaster panels. In the third storey is a casement window, and the top floor contains a cross-window. The gable has elaborate bargeboards and a finial. |
| Dutch Houses; 53.18967°N 2.89157°W | | c. 1670 (rebuilt) | Three shops built on the site of medieval houses with undercrofts. They are constructed in timber-framing and rendered brick, incorporating medieval sandstone piers, and have slate roofs. The building is in four storeys with attics, including a section of the Chester Rows, and has a three-bay front. At street level are modern shop fronts, and at the level of the rows is a balustrade with a stallboard behind. The third and fourth storeys are jettied, and contain barley sugar pilasters and casement windows, and the attics have mullioned and transomed windows. |
| 15 and 17 Castle Street; 53.18704°N 2.89108°W | | Late 17th century | A pair of brick houses on a sandstone plinth with slate roofs. They are in three storeys with cellars and attics in gables. Three steps lead up to the doorways, which have fanlights and hoods. The windows are sashes. At the top of the house is a moulded cornice. On the gables are pineapple finials, and on the valley parapet are stone balls. |
| 5 and 7 King Street; 53.19295°N 2.89368°W | | Late 17th century (probable) | A town house divided into two houses in about 1720. These are built in brick on a sandstone plinth with stone dressings and a slate roof. The houses are in two storeys with cellars, attic and a loft in the gable. Both doorways have fanlights. The windows are sashes. |
| 54 and 56 Northgate Street; 53.19215°N 2.89218°W | | Late 17th century | Originally two houses, later converted into one shop with storage. The building is in four storeys with cellars and a slate roof. The ground floor contains a shop front. The first floor is in brick with sandstone quoins, and contains two mullioned and transomed windows. The second and top floors contain canted oriel windows, below which are pargeted panels; around these is pebbledashing. The gables also contain pargeting, and have bargeboards and moulded cornices. |
| Workshop, Abbey Green; 53.19336°N 2.89214°W | — | Late 17th century (probable) | Originally the office of a quarry foreman, it is built in brick with a slate roof. It is rectangular in plan and in two storeys. The building contains latticed casement windows. |
| 11 and 11A Lower Bridge Street; 53.18823°N 2.89056°W | | Pre-18th century | Originally a house, later used as a shop and offices, the oldest part is the undercroft. The building was extended in the 18th century, and the frontage was added in about 1760. It is built in sandstone and brick, partly rendered, and has a hipped slate roof. The building is in four storeys with a cellar, and incorporates part of the Chester Rows. At street level there is a modern shop front, and at the rows level is a timber balustrade and two Doric columns. In the upper floors are sash windows with wedge lintels and false keystones. At the top of the building is a parapet. |
| 51 Lower Bridge Street; 53.18741°N 2.89005°W | | 1700 | A house built for John Mather, later used as a hotel and restaurant. It is constructed in brick on a rendered stone plinth, and has a slate roof. The building is in three storeys, with a semi-basement and an attic, and has a three-bay front. Steps lead down to the basement and up to the entrance, which has a bolection architrave with a broken scroll pediment on consoles. The windows are sashes with wedge lintels and keystones, and at the top of the building is a frieze and a modillion cornice. |
| 9 Bridge Street and Row; 53.19003°N 2.89141°W | | Late 17th to early 18th century | Shops with storage built on the site of a medieval house with an undercroft, altered in about 1840 and again in the 20th century. The building is in five storeys, including the undercroft and a section of the Chester Rows. At street level is a modern shop front, and at the level of the rows is a railing and a central cast-iron column, behind which is a stallboard. The upper storeys are rendered and contain sash windows. At the top of the building is a cornice. |
| 23 and 25 King Street; 53.19291°N 2.89482°W | | Late 17th or early 18th century | Two brick houses with slate roofs, they are in two storeys with cellars and attics. The original paired doors have been blocked, and replaced with doors in more lateral positions. The door to No. 23 has a cornice, and that to No. 25 has a fanlight. The windows are sashes. |
| Lyon House; 53.18975°N 2.89243°W | — | Late 17th or early 18th century | A brick house, later used as an office, with a slate roof. It is in three storeys, with the entrance on the east front. The windows in the lower two storeys are casements, and in the top floor are horizontally sliding sashes. There is also a tall staircase window. |
| 41 White Friars; 53.18835°N 2.89329°W | | c. 1700 | Part of a larger house later used as an office, it is in brick on a stone plinth with a slate roof. The building is in three storeys, and has a doorway with a cornice. The windows are sashes, and at the top of the building is a parapet. |
| White Friars Lodge; 53.18866°N 2.89200°W | | 17th–18th century | A house, later used as offices, with probably a medieval core. It was partly rebuilt and extended in 1885 by T. M. Lockwood. It is built in brown brick and sandstone with dressings in red Ruabon brick and terracotta, and has a slate roof. The building is in two storeys with cellars and an attic, it has gables on three sides, and a single-storey extension to the west. Above the doorway is an inscribed terracotta cartouche. The windows are mullioned and transomed casements. |
| 25 Castle Street; 53.18693°N 2.89153°W | | 1707 | A brick house standing on a corner site, later used as an office, partly rendered, on a plinth and with a slate roof. It is in two storeys with an attic, and has a three-bay front. The central bay is narrower with a pediment containing a bull's-eye window, and the west bay is rounded on the corner. There are quoins flanking the central bay and at the corners. Four steps lead up to the doorway, and the windows are sashes. At the top of the house is a modillion cornice, and three hipped dormers. |
| 35 Lower Bridge Street; 53.18778°N 2.89029°W | | 1717 | Originally a house, later a shop with accommodation above, it is built in rendered brick with a hipped slate roof. It is in four storeys with a modern shop front in the ground floor. Above are sash windows with wedge lintels and keystones. |
| 37, 39 and 41 Lower Bridge Street (Park House); 53.18768°N 2.89019°W | | 1717 | Built as a house with various later functions. It is constructed in rendered brick with a slate roof. It is in three storeys with semi-basements, and has a symmetrical five-bay front. In the semi-basements are shop fronts. Between these is a Tuscan porch with seven steps leading to a landing and four more steps to the doorway. The windows are sashes with wedge lintels and keystones. At the corners are rusticated quoins. |
| 13 Abbey Street; 53.19271°N 2.89005°W | | c. 1720 | A brick house with a slate roof. The original part is in three storeys and two bays, and there is an extension to the west, probably from the 18th century, in two storeys and two bays. In the original part is a doorway with a pedimented hood on consoles. Most of the windows are sashes. |
| 42 Bridge Street and Row; 53.18911°N 2.89145°W | | c. 1720 (rebuilt) | The building is in five storeys, including an undercroft and a section of Chester Rows. At street level is a shop front with flanking pilasters. At the level of the rows are cast-iron railings with painted sandstone piers at the ends, behind which is a stallboard and a shop front. The upper storeys are in painted brick and contain sash windows. At the top of the building is a coped gable, and at the rear is a three-storey wing. |
| 9 White Friars; 53.18855°N 2.89197°W | | c. 1720 | Two former houses, later joined into one and used as an office. The building is in brick with a slate roof. It is in three storeys, with cellars probably dating from the late medieval period, and has a front of four bays. The doorway has an architrave and a cornice, and the windows are sashes. At the top of the building is a stone cornice. |
| 7 and 9 Castle Street; 53.18710°N 2.89074°W | | Early 18th century (or earlier) | A pair of brick houses on a stone plinth with a slate roof. They are in three storeys, and each house has a single-bay front. Both doorways have fanlights, and that to No. 9 has a shaped frieze and a cornice. Most of the windows are sashes, and there are two blocked dormer gables in the roof. |
| 16 Castle Street; 53.18707°N 2.89142°W | | 18th century (or earlier) | Originating as a house, possibly with a warehouse, it has been used later as an office. It is rendered, has a slate roof, and is in three storeys. In the ground floor are two cambered arches; the left arch containing six steps leading up to a recessed doorway. The windows are casements, with two in the middle storey, and one in the top storey, which is gabled. |
| Wall, Abbey Green; 53.19380°N 2.89193°W | — | 18th century (or earlier) | A boundary wall between Abbey Green and Deanery Field, it is built in sandstone and brick. It contains a blocked doorway, which used to lead to the city walls. At the east end is a flight of steps. |
| 8 White Friars; 53.18869°N 2.89190°W | | Early 18th century | A brick house with a slate roof. The building in is two storeys with a painted stone plinth. There is a doorway with a scraper-recess and a moulded cornice, and four sash windows. The rear wing, also in brick, may be older than the frontage and has a gable, partly rendered and partly slate hung. |
| 20 and 22 Cuppin Street; 53.18813°N 2.89248°W | | Early 18th century | A pair of brick houses with a slate roof. They are in three storeys, and each house has two bays. The doorways are paired, and have doorcases with pilasters, pediments, and fanlights. The windows are sashes. |
| 27 Eastgate Street, 21 Eastgate Row; 53.19070°N 2.89019°W | | Early 18th century (rebuilt) | Originating as a house with an undercroft, and later converted into shops, it is in four storeys, including the undercroft and a section of Chester Rows. At street level is a modern shop front, and at the level of the rows are cast-iron railings with two columns, and a stallboard. The upper two storeys are in painted brick with rusticated stone quoins. There are two sash windows in the third storey, and one in the top floor, with Jacobethan embellishment above each window. At the top of the building is a moulded parapet with a shaped gable containing Chester City arms in a cartouche. |
| 11, 11A and 13 King Street; 53.19290°N 2.89406°W | | Early 18th century (probable) | Two houses, later used as offices, they are rendered on a plinth and have a slate roof. They are in three storeys, and have rusticated quoins. In the ground floor are two doorways with pilasters, and to the right is a carriage entrance. The upper storeys contain sash windows. |
| 21 King Street; 53.19290°N 2.89464°W | | Early 18th century | A brick house on a rendered stone plinth with a slate roof, it is in three storeys with cellars, and has a symmetrical front. The central doorway has pilasters and an entablature. The windows are sashes with brick heads containing keystones. |
| 15 and 17 Newgate Street; 53.18966°N 2.88888°W | | Early 18th century | Originally two houses, later converted into offices. They are in brick with a slate roof, are in three storeys, and have a six-bay front. Most of the windows are sashes. |
| 23 Newgate Street; 53.18952°N 2.88878°W | | Early 18th century (probable) | A brick cottage with a slate roof, it is in two storeys. The doorway and sash windows have wedge lintels and false keystones. |
| 39 Watergate Street, 47 and 49 Watergate Row; 53.19010°N 2.89232°W | | Early 18th century (rebuilt) | Originally a house with an undercroft, probably medieval, later a shop and office. It is in four storeys, including a section of the Chester Rows. The lower two storeys are in sandstone, and the upper storeys are in brick. At street level is a modern shop front, and at the level of the rows is a wooden balustrade and Roman Doric columns. In each of the upper storeys are three sash windows with stone sills and wedge lintels and keystones. At the sides of the building are rusticated quoins, at the top is a moulded cornice and a parapet. |
| 44 and 46 Watergate Street and Row; 53.19002°N 2.89351°W | | Early 18th century (rebuilt) | A shop and offices built on the site of a previous house with an undercroft on the corner of Crook Street. The building has four storeys, and is built in brick with the bottom storey rendered. On the Watergate Street front in the ground floor is a shop front with a porch containing a flight of steps to the left. The upper storeys contain sash windows, one in the second and third storeys, and two on the top storey. There are stone quoins on the corner, and more sash windows on the Crook Street front. |
| 61 and 63 Watergate Street, 71 and 77 Watergate Row53.18972°N 2.89424°W | | Early 18th century | Two shops and flats on the site of two medieval houses with undercrofts; some medieval material is present in the undercrofts. The façade was restored in the early 1970s when everything else was rebuilt. The building is in three storeys, including the undercroft and a section of the Chester Rows, and it has a front of two bays. The ground floor is in painted brick and contains shop windows and a door. At the level of the row is a gallery with two Tuscan columns in each bay. The top storey is rendered and contains sash windows. At the top of the building is a moulded cornice and a parapet. |
| 6 King Street; 53.19306°N 2.89379°W | | 1735 | A brick house on a rendered plinth with a slate roof. It is in three storeys and has a front of a single bay. The windows are sashes. |
| 32 and 34 King Street; 53.19303°N 2.89503°W | | Early to mid-18th century | A pair of houses that were refurbished in about 1840. They are built brick on a sandstone plinth. No. 32 has a slated roof, its door is on the east end and has pilasters and a Doric pediment. No. 34 is rendered and has a tiled roof. Its door is on the front, and has pilasters and an entablature. The windows are sashes with stone sills, wedge lintels and keystones. |
| 51 Watergate Street, 59 Watergate Row; 53.18982°N 2.89371°W | | Early to mid-18th century (rebuilt) | A shop and house in four storeys, including a section of the Chester Rows. The lower two storeys are in sandstone, partly rendered, and the upper storeys are in brick. At street level is a shop front, and at the level of the rows is a rail on balusters with a Tuscan column in the centre. There are two sash windows in each of the upper storeys, and a gable at the top of the building. |
| 1 and 3 Castle Street; 53.18719°N 2.89045°W | | Mid-18th century | Originally one or two houses, later converted into a shop, office and accommodation. It is built in brick with a slate roof, and is in three storeys with a basement. In the ground floor are shop windows and a door, and in the upper floors are sash windows. At the top of the building is a brick parapet and a moulded cornice. |
| 5 Castle Street; 53.18715°N 2.89059°W | | Mid-18th century | A brick house, possibly on an earlier core, with a slate roof. It is in three storeys with a loft, and has a five-bay front. The central doorway has a panelled case with a fanlight and a moulded hood on consoles. The windows are sashes, and at the top of the house is a moulded cornice and a brick parapet. |
| 29 Eastgate Street, 23 Eastgate Street Row; 53.19071°N 2.89011°W | | Mid-18th century (probable) | Originally a house with an undercroft, it was later altered and used as shops. The building is in four storeys, including the undercroft and a section of the Chester Rows, and is in a single bay. At street level is a modern shop front, and at the level of the rows are cast-iron railings and a stallboard. The upper two storeys are in painted brick with rusticated quoins; they contain sash windows. At the top of the building is a frieze and a cornice with a plain pediment. |
| 39 Eastgate Street; 53.19083°N 2.88938°W | | Mid-18th century (probable) | A shop with accommodation, built in brick with stone dressings, roughcast and pargeted. It is in three storeys, and has a single-bay front. In the bottom storey is a modern shop front. Each of the upper storeys contains a sash window. Around these is Baroque pargeting, including open pediments, putti heads, and vases in the middle storey. At the top of the building is a segmental modillion pediment and a parapet. |
| 41 Eastgate Street; 53.19080°N 2.88929°W | | Mid-18th century (probable) | A shop with accommodation built in brick with stone dressings and a slate roof. It is in three storeys with a modern shop front in the ground floor. The upper storeys have rusticated quoins at the sides. In the middle storey are two cross-windows with stone sills and wedge lintels and false keystones. The top storey contains two sash windows, and at the top of the buildings is a modillion pediment. |
| 10 King Street; 53.19304°N 2.89379°W | | Mid-18th century (probable) | A brick house on a rendered plinth with a slate roof. It is in three storeys and has a single-bay front. Two steps lead up to a doorway with a fanlight. The windows are sashes, with two in the middle storey and one in the others. At the top of the building is a cornice and a parapet. |
| 15 and 17 King Street; 53.19290°N 2.89423°W | | Mid-18th century | A pair of brick houses on a rendered plinth with a slate roof. They are in three storeys with cellars. Above each door is a fanlight. The windows are sashes with stone sills and rusticated wedge lintels and keystones. |
| 49 Lower Bridge Street; 53.18746°N 2.89015°W | | Mid-18th century (probable) | A house, later part of a hotel, it is in brick with stone dressings and a slate roof. The building is in four storeys with a basement, and has a single-bay front. Nine steps lead down to the basement, and four steps up to a doorway having a pedimented case with fluted pilasters. The windows are sashes and on the corners are quoins. |
| 10 Northgate Street, 8 Northgate Row; 53.19066°N 2.89129°W | | Mid-18th century | Shops and living accommodation built on the site of a medieval house with an undercroft. It is in four storeys, including a section of Chester Rows. At street level is a modern shop front, and at the level of the rows is a balustrade with two intermediate Tuscan columns, and a stallboard behind. The upper two storeys are in brick and contain sash windows. At the top of the building is a parapet. |
| 62 and 64 Northgate Street; 53.19232°N 2.89227°W | | Mid-18th century | A shop with accommodation built in brick, the ground floor rendered, with a slate roof, and in three storeys. In the ground floor is a doorway and a modern shop front. The upper two storeys each contain three sash windows with stone sills and rusticated wedge lintels and keystones. At the top of the building is a moulded cornice and a brick parapet with stone coping. |
| 66–74 Northgate Street; 53.19243°N 2.89231°W | | Mid-18th century | A row of three brick shops with slate roofs. At the south end are rusticated quoins. The shops are in three storeys with modern shop fronts in the ground floor. In the storeys above are sash windows with stone sills and rusticated wedge lintels and keystones. At the top of the building is a cornice and a brick parapet with stone coping. In the roof are dormers. |
| 90–98 Northgate Street; 53.19288°N 2.89263°W | | Mid-18th century | Originally two houses, later converted into shops and offices. They are built in brick, and are in three storeys. In the ground floor are modern shop fronts. Above this are sash windows, those in Nos. 96 and 98 having wedge lintels with keystones. At the top of the building are cornices and parapets. |
| 4 Shipgate Street; 53.18647°N 2.89005°W | | Mid-18th century (probable) | Originally a house, later part of an office, this is built in brick with a slate roof. It is in two storeys with a semi-basement. Nine steps with iron railings lead up to the doorway. This has a panelled doorcase with quasi-Ionic fluted pilasters, an architrave, a frieze, and a modillion cornice. On top is a pediment with a tympanum decorated with a cockle-shell between two winged putti-heads. The windows in the semi-basement are casements, and elsewhere they are sashes. |
| 6 and 8 Watergate Street, 4 Watergate Row; 53.19033°N 2.89189°W | | Mid-18th century | Offices built on the site of two former houses with undercrofts. The building was refaced in the early 19th century. It is in four storeys, and includes a section of the Chester Rows. At street level are modern shop fronts, and at the level of the row are railings with a central Tuscan column. The upper two storeys are in brick, and the roof is slated; these storeys contain sash windows, and at the top of the building is a cornice. |
| 78 Watergate Street, 1 Linen Hall Place; 53.18971°N 2.89557°W | | Mid-18th century (probable) | A brick house on a sandstone plinth with a slate roof standing on a corner site. The doorway is in Linen Hall Place, and has a fanlight and a pediment. The windows are sashes. |
| 93 Watergate Street; 53.18952°N 2.89585°W | | Mid-18th century | A brick house on a stone plinth with a slate roof. It is in three storeys, and has a three-bay front. The front is on Nicholas Street Mews, and has a central doorway that is approached by four steps, and has a fanlight and a pediment. The windows are sashes with stone sills. |
| Bank House; 53.18874°N 2.89292°W | | Mid-18th century (probable) | A detached house in Georgian style with three storeys. It is built in brick with a slate roof. The doorway has a frieze decorated with roses. The windows are sashes, and at the top of the house is a parapet with stone coping. On the north face of the house are three gables. |
| Ulver House; 53.19291°N 2.89438°W | | Mid-18th century (probable) | A rendered house with a slate roof, it is in three storeys with a cellar. Two steps lead up to a door with a fanlight in a recessed porch that has a doorcase with panelled pilasters and an open pediment. The windows are sashes. At the rear is a three-storey wing. |
| 16 Castle Street; 53.18709°N 2.89154°W | | 18th century (probable) | Originally a warehouse, later used as an office, its walls are rendered and the building has a slate roof. It is in three storeys with a cellar, and has a symmetrical front. There are loading bays in the centre of each storey, and these are flanked by sash windows. At the top of the building is a gable. |
| 21 Castle Street; 53.18698°N 2.89127°W | | 18th century (probable) | A rendered house in three storeys with a three-bay front. There is a central doorway, and the windows are sashes with wedge lintels with false keystones. |
| 11 and 11A Lower Bridge Street; 53.18822°N 2.89054°W | | 18th century (extended) | A shop and offices built on the site of a house with undercroft. The front dates from about 1760. The building is in four storeys with a cellar, and includes a section of Chester Rows. At street level is a modern shop front, and at the level of the row is a timber balustrade and two Doric columns, behind which is a stallboard. The upper storeys are in brick and contain sash windows stone sills and rusticated wedge lintels with false keystones. At the top of the building is a parapet. |
| 33 Lower Bridge Street; 53.18778°N 2.89029°W | | 18th century (rebuilt) | Originally a medieval house with an undercroft, it was rebuilt in brick with a slate roof. The building is in four storeys and has a two-bay front. The ground floor contains a shop front, and above are sash windows and a gable. |
| 22 and 24 Northgate Street; 53.19098°N 2.89140°W | | 18th century (rebuilt) (probable) | A house rebuilt on two medieval undercrofts, and used later for various purposes. It is built in brick with a slate roof. The building is in four storeys with cellars, and has a three-bay front. In the lower two storeys are modern shop fronts and windows. Between the second and third storeys is a band inscribed "CITY OF CHESTER". In the top two storeys are sash windows. |
| 13 White Friars; 53.18848°N 2.89221°W | | 18th century (probable) | A house, later used as an office, with probable medieval material in the cellars. It is built in brick on a rendered plinth and has a slate roof. The building is in three storeys with a symmetrical three-bay front. The central doorway has fluted pilasters, a pediment, and a fanlight. The windows are sashes with stone sills and wedge lintels. |
| Boundary wall, Abbey Green; 53.19345°N 2.89179°W | — | 18th century | The wall is in brick with stone coping. A flight of three steps leads down to Deanery Field. |
| Garden wall, 13 and 14 Abbey Square; 53.19236°N 2.89141°W | | 18th century (probable) | The garden wall is in sandstone and has a round top. It was originally the plinth for railings that have been removed. |
| Wall and gate piers, Bank House; 53.18852°N 2.89285°W | — | 18th century (probable) | The wall surrounds part of the former garden of the house. It is in brick with a sandstone coping, and contains probably medieval fragments of the wall of the Carmelite Friary. The gate piers are plain and carry a wrought iron lantern arch. |
| Wall and gate piers, Bishop's House; 53.19259°N 2.89117°W | | 18th century | The wall is around the garden of the Bishop's House, and is built in sandstone and brick. The gate piers to Abbey Square have fluted capstones and cornices with pyramidal tops and stone balls. The gateway to Abbey Street has a Gothic arch. |
| Garden wall and gate piers, White Friars; 53.18843°N 2.89340°W | — | 18th century (probable) | The wall is built in sandstone and brick. The gate piers are also in stone, they are square and have pyramidal caps. |
| Sundial; 53.18623°N 2.89086°W | — | 18th century (probable) | The sundial is in the churchyard of the former Church of St Mary. It is in stone, and consists of a three-stage octagonal baluster with panels, standing on a square base. On the top is a copper dial and a damaged gnomon. |
| Abbey Chambers; 53.19249°N 2.89139°W | | 1754 | A brick house, later used as an office, with a slate roof, in Georgian style. It is in three storeys with cellars, and has a symmetrical three-bay front. Four steps lead up to a doorway with panelled and fluted pilasters with lions' heads at the corners, a frieze and a cornice hood. The windows are sashes, and at the top of the building is a parapet. |
| Chester Royal Infirmary; 53.19140°N 2.89750°W | | 1758–61 | The hospital was designed by William Yoxall, and the interior was remodelled in 1830 by William Cole, junior, with extensions added later. It is built in brick with stone dressings, and has slate roofs. The entrance front faces City Walls Road, and wings containing the wards stretch behind it. In the centre is a canted porch with Doric columns. The windows are all sashes or French windows. |
| 63 Bridge Street, 75 Bridge Street Row; 53.18871°N 2.89083°W | | c. 1760 | A shop and accommodation built on the site of a house with an undercroft. It is in four storeys, including the undercroft and a section of the Chester Rows. At street level is a modern shop front, and at the level of the row are railings with a stallboard behind. The upper storeys are in brick, and contain one sash window in each floor; these have rusticated wedge lintels, and false keystones. At the top of the building is a stone cornice and a brick parapet. |
| 2 and 3 Clayton Court; 53.18748°N 2.88805°W | | c. 1760 | A house, altered later, in brick on a stone plinth with stone dressings and a rendered front, and with a slate roof. It is in three storeys with a cellar, and has a four-bay front. The windows are sashes. |
| Wall to lawn, Abbey Square; 53.19233°N 2.89182°W | | c. 1760 | The wall is in ashlar red sandstone and surrounds the oval lawn in the centre of the square. |
| 52 Bridge Street, 2 White Friars; 53.18874°N 2.89134°W | | c. 1760 (probable) | A shop and office built on the site of the service, with an undercroft, of a medieval house. It is built in brick and has a slate roof. The building is in four storeys, with modern shop fronts in the bottom storey. The windows are sashes, those on the Bridge Street front having stone sills, rusticated wedge lintels, and fluted keystones. On the White Friars front is a doorway with fluted pilasters, a pediment, and a fanlight. |
| 4 White Friars; 53.18869°N 2.89164°W | | c. 1760 (probable) | Originally a warehouse, this was remodelled in about 1860. It is in brick with four storeys, the lower two storeys being stuccoed. The building has a five-bay front with two doorways. The doorway to the left is plain, and that towards the centre has a doorcase with fluted pilasters and a hood carried on ornate brackets, with Maltese crosses in its frieze. The windows are a mix of casements, and sashes. |
| 80 Watergate Street; 53.18968°N 2.89568°W | | Mid- to late 18th century | A brick house on a sandstone plinth with a slate roof. It is in three storeys with an attic. The doorway is approached by three stone steps. The windows are sashes, those in the lower three storeys with wedge lintels and false keystones. At the top of the house is a moulded cornice. |
| 82 Watergate Street; 53.18968°N 2.89572°W | | Mid- to late 18th century | A brick house on a sandstone plinth with a slate roof, in three storeys. The doorway is approached by three stone steps. The windows are sashes with wedge lintels. At the top of the house is a cornice. |
| Richard House; 53.18663°N 2.88999°W | | Mid- to late 18th century | This originated as houses and a warehouse. They were restored in about 1980, and have been used as an office. The building is in brick with a slate roof, it is in four storeys, and has a front of three bays. Most of the windows are sashes. Other features include an altered loading bay, a reconstructed bow window, and an L-shaped staircase leading up to a doorway with a fanlight and a pediment. |
| 1 Bridge Place; 53.18660°N 2.88935°W | | c. 1770 | A house, later converted into other uses. It is in three storeys with a basement, the basement being in sandstone, and the upper parts in brick. There are two doorways, each approached by a flight of steps. Both doorways have fanlights; the south doorway also has fluted pilasters, and a dentilled open pediment. The windows are sashes with wedge lintels and keystones. |
| 60 Eastgate Street, 11 City Walls; 53.19074°N 2.88883°W | | c. 1770 | Originally a house, later used for other purposes, it is rendered with stone dressings and has a slate roof. The building is in three storeys with a cellar and attic. On the Eastgate Street front is a three-bay Tuscan colonnade on the ground floor, behind which is a modern office front. In the storeys above are sash windows with stone sills and rusticated wedge lintels with false keystones. On the city walls front is a doorway giving access to the walls. |
| 19 Newgate Street; 53.18962°N 2.88887°W | | c. 1770 | A brick house, later used as an office, on a stone plinth with a slate roof. It is in three storeys, and has a single-bay front. The doorway has an architrave with a frieze and a glazed pediment. The windows are sashes, those in the lower two storeys with wedge lintels and keystones. At the top of the building is a stone cornice and a brick parapet with a stone coping. |
| 13 and 15 Watergate Street, 17 and 19 Watergate Row; 53.19009°N 2.89244°W | | 1771 | Shops built on the site of a medieval house with an undercroft. The building is in four storeys including the undercroft and a section of the Chester Rows. At street level is a modern shop front, and at the level of the rows is a balustrade with a central Tuscan column. The storeys above are in brick and each storey contains two sash windows with stone sills and lintels. At the top of the building is a moulded cornice and a coped parapet. |
| 18 King Street; 53.19303°N 2.89414°W | | c. 1775 | A brick house on a stone plinth with a slate roof. It is in four storeys, and has a two-bay front. Above the door is a fanlight. The windows are sashes with rusticated wedge lintels and keystones. At the top of the building is a brick parapet with a stone cap. |
| 3 Bridge Place; 53.18656°N 2.88931°W | | Late 18th century | A brick house with a stone plinth and a slate roof in three storeys with cellars. The doorway has panelled pilasters, a pediment, and a fanlight. The windows are sashes with stone sills and wedge lintels. At the top of the house is a stone cornice. |
| 7, 9 and 11 Bridge Place; 53.18642°N 2.88918°W | | Late 18th century | Three brick houses, each with a hipped slate roof. They have three storeys with cellars, and each house has a raised forecourt with railings and steps going down to the cellar and up to the entrance. All the doorways have fanlights, and decorative doorcases of differing styles. The windows are sashes with wedge lintels. At the top of the houses is a cornice. |
| 17 and 19 Bridge Street, 21 and 23 Bridge Street Row; 53.18989°N 2.89132°W | | Late 18th century | Shops and accommodation built on the site of a house with an undercroft. It is in four storeys, including the undercroft and a section of the Chester Rows. At street level is a modern shop font, and at the level of the rows is a cast-iron railing with Doric end-piers. The upper storeys are rendered, and each contains two sash windows. At the top of the building is a shallow coped gable. |
| 55 Bridge Street, 61 Bridge Street Row; 53.18895°N 2.89097°W | | Late 18th century | The building above the undercroft was rebuilt in 1889 by Thomas Edwards, and has been used since as an art gallery, and later as shops. The building is in three storeys, including the undercroft and a section of the Chester Rows. At street level is a modern shop front, with a flight of steps on the left leading up to the rows. At the level of the row is a timber balustrade, with a stallboard behind. The upper storey is timber-framed and is expressed as two storeys, both levels of which are jettied. Its sole-plate carries an inscription, above which is a row of eight panels containing reliefs and inscriptions. Over this is a pair of mullioned and transomed oriel windows, in the centre of which is a niche containing a statue of King Charles I. The next level contains another inscribed beam and a casement window, above which is a jettied gable with carved bargeboards and a shaped finial. |
| 22 Castle Street; 53.18703°N 2.89205°W | | Late 18th century | A brick house, later used as an office, with a slate roof. It is in three storeys with an attic, and has a three-bay front. The doorway is pedimented, and the windows are sashes with wedge lintels. At the top of the building is a stone frieze, a cornice, and a rendered parapet. |
| 16 Eastgate Street and Row; 53.19033°N 2.89079°W | | Late 18th century (probable) | A shop with storage built on the site of a previous house with an undercroft. It has four storeys, including the undercroft and a section of the Chester Rows. At street level is a modern shop front, and at the level of the row are cast-iron railings with two cast-iron columns. The upper storeys are in brick, and both storeys contain two sash windows with wedge lintels. At the top of the building is a stone cornice, and the roof is slated. |
| 14 King Street; 53.19303°N 2.89403°W | | Late 18th century | The house was restored in the 1970s. It is built in brick with a stuccoed stone plinth and a slate roof. The house is in three storeys, and has a single-bay front. The doorway has a fanlight and a pediment. The windows are sashes with wedge lintels and keystones. |
| 70, 70A, 72 and 74 Lower Bridge Street; 53.18679°N 2.89010°W | | Late 18th century (probable) | Two shops and offices built on the site of two houses with undercrofts. They are built in brick on a stone plinth with slate roofs, are in four storeys, and have three-bay front. The ground floor contains two shop fronts, with an entry on the left containing a flight of twelve steps. Each of the upper floors contains three sash windows with wedge lintels, and at the top of the building is a cornice. |
| 12A Shipgate Street; 53.18627°N 2.89029°W | | Late 18th century | A brick house on a sandstone plinth with a slate roof, in three storeys with a three-bay front. Three steps lead up to a doorway with a pediment. The windows are sashes, those on the Shipgate Street front having stone sills with rusticated wedge lintels and keystones. |
| 88 and 90 Watergate Street; 53.18965°N 2.89614°W | | Late 18th century (probable) | A pair of houses later converted into one office. It is built in brick with a stone plinth and a slate roof. The building is in three storeys with a cellar, and with dormers in the roof. In the east part of the ground floor is a doorway with a fanlight and a pediment on consoles. Each storey contains four sash windows with stone sills and wedge lintels. |
| 16 White Friars; 53.18858°N 2.89258°W | | Late 18th century | A house, later used as offices, in brick with a slate roof. It is in three storeys, and has a five-bay front. In the centre is a Roman Doric doorcase with 3/4 columns, a frieze, a pediment, and a fanlight. The windows are sashes, and at the top of the building is a cornice. |
| 31 and 33 White Friars; 53.18838°N 2.89303°W | | Late 18th century (probable) | Two brick houses with slate roofs. They are in three storeys, with cellars of medieval origin, and each house is in a single bay. The doorways are paired and have fanlights, pilasters, friezes, and cornices. The windows are a mix of sashes and casements. |
| 35 White Friars; 53.18836°N 2.89316°W | — | Late 18th century | A brick house with a stone plinth and a slate roof, later used as an office. It is in three storeys, with cellars of medieval origin, and has a two-bay front. The doorway has a fanlight, fluted pilasters, dentils, and a pediment. The windows are sashes with stone sills and wedge lintels. At the top of the building is a stone cornice. |
| 43 White Friars; 53.18834°N 2.89357°W | | Late 18th century (probable) | Part of a former larger house, built in brick on a stone plinth with a flat 20th-century roof. The building is in three storeys and has a two-bay front. The windows are sashes with wedge lintels and false keystones. |
| Bishop's House; 53.19282°N 2.89121°W | | Late 18th century | The house was originally the Deanery, and was altered in 1886. It is built in brick with a Westmorland slate roof. The house is in two storeys with a basement, and has a symmetrical five-bay front, the central bay projecting forward and gabled. There is a central protruding flat-roofed porch containing a doorcase with an architrave, a frieze, and a cornice. The windows are sashes with wedge lintels. |
| Plumber's Arms public house 53.18956°N 2.88882°W | | Late 18th century (probable) | The public house is roughcast with a slate roof. It is in three storeys, and has a single-bay front. The ground floor is timber-framed, and contains a window and a doorway with pilasters and a dentil cornice. The upper storeys contain sash windows, and at the top is a parapet inscribed with the name of the public house. |
| 34 Bridge Street, 32 Bridge Street Row; 53.18940°N 2.89152°W | | 1770s (probable) | Shops and accommodation built on the site of a previous house. The building is in four storeys, including a section of the Chester Rows. At street level is a modern shop front, and at the level of the row are cast-iron railings and a central Tuscan column, behind which is a stallboard. The upper storeys are in brick and each storey contains two sash windows with stone sills and rusticated wedge lintels with keystones. At the top of the building is a modillion cornice. |
| 5 and 7 St Martin's Way; 53.19151°N 2.89599°W | | 1777 | Two brick houses on a stone plinth with slate roofs; both are in three storeys. No. 7 is the older house, No. 5 dating from the early 19th century. No. 7 has a front of four bays, and a doorway with a fanlight, a Gibbs surround and a pediment. No. 5 is in two bays, and has a round-arched doorway, also with a fanlight. The windows are sashes. |
| 10–28 Nicholas Street; 53.18903°N 2.89510°W | | 1780 | A terrace of ten houses, later converted into other uses. Nos. 10–22 were designed by Joseph Turner, and the other houses were added later in the decade. The houses are in brick with a slate roof, are in three storeys with basements, and each house has a three-bay front. The doorways have sidelights and fanlights, and cases with panelled pilasters, friezes and moulded pedimented cornices. The windows are sashes. At the top of the terrace is a fluted frieze, a moulded cornice, and a stone parapet. The steps, railings and lamp holders in front of the terrace are included in the listing. |
| 9 Stanley Place; 53.19007°N 2.89724°W | | 1780 | A brick house with a stone plinth and a slate roof. It is in three storeys. The doorway has a fanlight and a pediment. The windows are sashes, and at the top of the house is a cornice. |
| 12 Stanley Place; 53.19031°N 2.89748°W | | 1780 | A brick house with a slate roof. It is in three storeys, and has a doorway with a fanlight, pilasters, and a pediment. The windows are sashes, and at the top of the house is a cornice. |
| 1 Stanley Street; 53.18959°N 2.89653°W | | c. 1780 | Originally a house, later used for other purposes, it is built in brick on a stone plinth and has a slate roof. The building is in three storeys with cellars and an attic, and on its corner are rusticated stone quoins. The doorway has a fanlight and a cornice. There is a Diocletian window in the attic gable; the other windows are sashes with wedge lintels and keystones. |
| 5 Stanley Place; 53.19011°N 2.89718°W | | c. 1780 | A house later converted into an office and flats, built in brick on a stone plinth, and with a slate roof. It is in three storeys, and has a doorway with a fanlight and a pediment. The windows are sashes. |
| 7 Stanley Place; 53.19010°N 2.89717°W | | c. 1780 | A house later converted into offices, built in brick on a stone plinth with a slate Mansard roof. The building is in three storeys with an attic. The doorway has a fanlight and a pediment. The windows are sashes two of which are in dormers in the attic. |
| 11 Stanley Place; 53.19005°N 2.89738°W | | c. 1780 | A house later converted for other uses. It is in brick on a stone plinth with a slate Mansard roof. The building is in three storeys with an attic; above the door is a fanlight. In each full storey are two sash windows, and in the attic are two dormers with pilasters and pediments. |
| 92 Watergate Street; 53.18957°N 2.89663°W | | c. 1780 | A brick house on a stone plinth with a slate roof. It is in three storeys with a cellar. The door has a fanlight and a doorcase having an architrave with roses on the corners, and a moulded hood. The windows are sashes, and at the top of the house is a modillion cornice. |
| 94 Watergate Street; 53.18956°N 2.89672°W | | c. 1780 | A brick house on a stone plinth with a slate roof in three storeys with a cellar. The door has a fanlight and a moulded hood. The windows are sashes with stone sills and wedge lintels. There is an additional wing at the rear. |
| 96 Watergate Street; 53.18955°N 2.89683°W | | c. 1780 | A brick house on a stone plinth with a slate roof in three storeys with a cellar. The doorway has a fanlight, Ionic pilasters, and a pediment. The windows are sashes with stone sills and wedge lintels. At the top of the building is a cornice, and there is an additional wing at the rear. |
| 98 Watergate Street; 53.18953°N 2.89693°W | | c. 1780 | A brick house on a stone plinth with a slate roof in three storeys. Two steps lead up to a doorway with fluted pilasters and a pediment with a reeded frieze. The windows are sashes with stone sills and rusticated wedge lintels with reeded false keystones. At the top of the house is a cornice with a reeded frieze. |
| 102 Watergate Street; 53.18950°N 2.89714°W | | c. 1780 | A brick house with a slate roof in three storeys and a semi-basement. In the ground floor is a porch with a pediment containing steps leading up to a door with a fanlight. The windows are sashes with stone sills and wedge lintels. At the rear of the house is a three-storey wing. |
| Maclean House; 53.19035°N 2.89762°W | | c. 1780 | A brick house with slate roofs, later used for other purposes. It is in three storeys, and has a six-bay front on City Walls Road. On this front is a doorway with sidelights, fluted pilasters and a pediment. The windows are sashes with stone sills and cornices. |
| Grosvenor House; 53.18946°N 2.89721°W | | c. 1780 | Built as a house, it has later been converted for use as an office and flats. It is constructed in brick with a stone plinth and a slate roof, and is in three storeys with a semi-basement. A wing projects into City Walls Road, and contains a pedimented doorway approached up eleven steps. The windows are sashes, most of which have stone sills and wedge lintels. |
| Soughton House, 3 Grey Friars; 53.18838°N 2.89561°W | — | c. 1780 | Two houses in rendered brick with slate roofs. They are in two and three storeys with cellars, and the windows are mainly sashes. There is a doorway with a fanlight and a pedimented doorcase. |
| 4, 6 and 8 Nicholas Street; 53.18946°N 2.89525°W | | c. 1781 | Originally three houses designed by Joseph Turner, later converted into shop and offices. They are built in brick with slate roofs. The buildings are in three storeys, and each property has a two-bay front. No. 4 has a recessed modern shop front; the other houses have doorways with fanlights, and doorcases with panelled pilasters, a frieze and a cornice. The upper floors contain sash windows with wedge lintels. |
| 2 Stanley Place; 53.19037°N 2.89694°W | | 1782 | A brick house with a slate roof, in three storeys with a two-bay front. The doorway has pilasters, and a pediment. The windows are sashes with wedge lintels, and the top of the house is a cornice. |
| 4–10 Stanley Place; 53.19035°N 2.89716°W | | c. 1782 | A row of four brick houses with slate roofs. Each house is in three storeys with a four-storey rear wing. The doors each have a fanlight, and a doorcase with panelled pilasters and moulded dentil pediments. The windows are sashes. |
| 9 King Street; 53.19291°N 2.89388°W | | 1783 | A house that has incorporated a smaller earlier house. It is rendered on a stone plinth and has a slate roof. The house is in three storeys with cellars, and has a front of five bays. The central doorway has a fanlight and sidelights. The doorcase has decorated pilasters and a hood with a moulded frieze and a cornice. There are also doorways with fanlights in both lateral bays. The windows are sashes, and the top of the house is a parapet. |
| 3 Stanley Place; 53.19012°N 2.89691°W | | 1783 | A brown house on a stone plinth with a slate roof in three storeys. It was altered and converted into an office in 1989. The doorway has a fanlight and a pediment. The windows are sashes, and the top of the house is a cornice. |
| 1 Abbey Green, 3 and 4 City Walls; 53.19382°N 2.89278°W | — | 1780s (probable) | This originated as a row of three houses, later used as a restaurant. An extension was added to the south in 1990–91. The building is in brick and has a slate roof. On the front facing Abbey Green is a door with pilasters, a frieze, and a hood. Most of the windows are sashes. |
| Folliott House; 53.19296°N 2.89306°W | | 1788 | A house, later used as offices, in painted brick on a stone plinth with a slate roof. It is in three storeys, with its entrances in an alley on the south face; there are two doorways, each with a fanlight. Most of the windows are sashes. |
| 28 Bridge Street, 26 Bridge Street Row; 53.18960°N 2.89157°W | | c. 1789 | Formerly a public house, later converted into shops. It is in four storeys with cellars, and includes a section of the Chester Rows. There is a single bay facing Bridge Street, and it extends along Commonhall Street. At street level is a modern shop front, and at the level of the rows is a rail with barley sugar balusters, behind which is a stallboard. Most of the rest of the building is rendered, other than a portion of the wall along Commonhall Street. The windows are mainly casements. |
| 100 Watergate Street; 53.18951°N 2.89701°W | | c. 1790 | A brick house on a stone plinth with a slate roof in three storeys. Four steps lead up to the doorway, which is panelled, and has a pediment on consoles. The windows are sashes with wedge lintels and reeded false keystones. At the top of the house is a moulded cornice. |
| White Friars House; 53.18860°N 2.89244°W | — | 1796 (rebuilt) | A house rebuilt on medieval cellars. It is in three storeys, the bottom storey being in stone and the upper parts in brick, and it has a slate roof. The house has a front of four bays, with a doorway in the third bay. This has an ornate doorcase and a dentilled segmental pediment. The windows are sashes with wedge lintels. Between the ground and first floors are brackets remaining from a balcony that has been removed. |
| 128, 130 and 132 Northgate Street; 53.19357°N 2.89303°W | — | 1799 | A row of three shops with accommodation above, built in brick with slate roofs. They are in three storeys, and have modern shop fronts in the ground floors. They upper storeys contain sash windows with painted stone sills. |
| 84 Watergate Street; 53.18969°N 2.89588°W | | Late 18th or early 19th century | A brick house on a sandstone plinth with a slate roof. It is in three storeys with a cellar, and has a doorcase with a simple pediment. Most of the windows are sashes with stone sills and wedge lintels. At the rear, the lower storey is rendered, and one of the windows is a casement. |
| 86 Watergate Street; 53.18966°N 2.89598°W | | Late 18th or early 19th century | Originally a house, later converted into a shop, it is built in brick on a stone plinth. The building is in three storeys. In the ground floor is a recessed house doorway with a fanlight, to the left of which is a modern shop front. Both of the upper storeys contain two sash windows with stone sill and wedge lintels. |
| 1 and 2 City Walls; 53.19380°N 2.89298°W | | c. 1800 | A shop and workshop built in brick with a slate roof. It is in three storeys with an attic. There are shop fronts and windows, the other windows being a mix of sashes and casements. |
| 25 and 27 Bridge Street, 29 and 31 Bridge Street Row; 53.18967°N 2.89120°W | | c. 1800 | Shops with storage built on the site of a previous house with an undercroft. It is in four storeys, including the undercroft and a section of Chester Rows. At street level is a modern shop front, with a flight of twelve steps leading up to the rows. At the level of the rows are decorative cast-iron railings and a central Roman Doric column. The upper storeys are in brick, the third storey containing a canted oriel window; the other windows are sashes. At the top of the building is a cornice and a low parapet. |
| 29 Bridge Street; 53.18961°N 2.89118°W | | c. 1800 | Shops with storage built on the site of a previous house with an undercroft. It is in four storeys, including the undercroft and a section of Chester Rows. At street level is a modern shop front, and a flight of twelve steps leading up to the rows. At the level of the rows are decorative cast-iron railings and two Roman Doric columns, behind which is a stallboard. The upper storeys are in brick and each storey contains two sash windows with stone sills and wedge lintels. At the top of the building is a moulded cornice. |
| 1 and 3 King Street; 53.19298°N 2.89352°W | | c. 1800 | A pair of brick cottages with slate roofs in two storeys. No. 1 has a two-bay front and a doorway with a pediment, and No. 3 is in a single bay with a simple doorway. The windows are sashes. |
| 22 King Street; 53.19303°N 2.89430°W | | c. 1800 | A brick house with a slate roof, it is in three storeys and has a two-bay front. Above the doorway is a fanlight and a small hood. The windows are sashes with stone sills; in the lower three storeys they also have wedge lintels and keystones. |
| 76 Lower Bridge Street; 53.18673°N 2.89007°W | | c. 1800 (probable) | A house, later used as offices, built in brick on a sandstone plinth. It is in three storeys, with a two-bay front. Three steps lead up to a doorway with panelled pilasters and a fanlight. The windows are sashes with stone sills and wedge lintels. At the top of the building is a stone-coped parapet. |
| 8 and 10 Shipgate Street; 53.18634°N 2.89020°W | | c. 1800 | A pair of brick cottages with slate roofs. They are in three storeys, and each cottage has a single bay. Two steps lead up to the doorways, which have a hood on a bracket. The windows are sashes. |
| 3, 5 and 7 White Friars; 53.18858°N 2.89172°W | | c. 1800 | A row of three brick cottages on a sandstone plinth with a slate roof. They are in two storeys; No. 3 has two windows in the upper storey, and the others have one. There is an entry between No. 3 and No. 5. The doorways have pilasters and fanlights, and |
| 12 White Friars; 53.18861°N 2.89228°W | | c. 1800 (rebuilt) | A house rebuilt on probable medieval cellars, and later used as an office. It is built in brick on a stone plinth and has a slate roof. The house is in three storeys and has a two-bay front. The doorway has a fanlight and a pediment on consoles. In the ground floor is a shallow bow window. Above are sash windows with stone sills and wedge lintels, and at the top of the building is a stone cornice. |
| 37 and 39 White Friars; 53.18835°N 2.89331°W | | c. 1800 | A pair of brick houses on a stone plinth with a slate roof. They are in three storeys with cellars of medieval origin. The doorways have doorcases with pilasters and pediments. No. 39 has a Venetian window, and the other windows are sashes. |
| 5 and 7 Watergate Street and Row; 53.19014°N 2.89210°W | | 1803 (largely rebuilt) | Two shops built on the site of a house with an undercroft. Some fabric from the 15th century or earlier is still present. The building is in four storeys, and includes a section of the Chester Rows. At street level are modern shop fronts, and at the level of the rows are railings, brick piers, and octagonal columns, behind which are stallboards. The upper storeys are in brick and contain sash windows. |
| 16 and 18 Bridge Street, 14 Bridge Street Row; 53.18986°N 2.89167°W | | c. 1804 | A pair of shops with accommodation, probably built on the site of an earlier house with an undercroft. They are in four storeys, and include a section of the Chester Rows. At street level is a modern shop front, and at the level of the rows are cast-iron railings with a stallboard behind. The two upper storeys are in brick and contain sash windows with wedge lintels. At the top of the building is a stone cornice. |
| Wall and railings, Castle Square; 53.18646°N 2.89162°W | — | 1804 | The walls and railings were designed by Thomas Harrison at the side of the access footpath from St Mary's Hill to Castle Square. The wall is in sandstone and the railings are iron. On the post at the east end is a pineapple finial. |
| Chester City Club; 53.19060°N 2.89157°W | | 1807 | This was designed as a gentlemen's club by Thomas Harrison. The front is constructed in ashlar stone, and the sides and rear is in brick. It is expressed as two storeys at the front, and three at the rear. The lower storey at the front consists of a rusticated three-bay arcade, behind which are modern shop fronts. Above are four Ionic pilasters and sash windows, and on the top of the building is a pediment above an architrave and a frieze. |
| Commercial Hotel and St Peter's Art Gallery; 53.19052°N 2.89195°W | | c. 1807 | The hotel and art gallery are built in brick on a sandstone plinth with slate roofs. The building is in three storeys and has a symmetrical front. The doorway has an architrave, a frieze, a cornice, and a fanlight. The windows are sashes. |
| St Martin's Lodge; 53.18753°N 2.89498°W | | c. 1820 | A detached house designed by Thomas Harrison for his own use; it has since had a variety of uses. The house is built in brick, partly stuccoed, and has a hipped slate roof. It is in two storeys, and has fronts of three bays. In the entrance front is a doorway with an architrave, pilasters, an entablature with a modillion cornice, and a fanlight. The windows are sashes. |
| Garden and terrace walls, St Martin's Lodge; 53.18740°N 2.89540°W | | c. 1820 | The walls were probably designed by Thomas Harrison. They have a curved plan, and are in sandstone. The walls stretch along the south of the garden, and continue as the retaining wall of the upper terrace. |
| Wall, Watergate House; 53.18948°N 2.89647°W | — | c. 1820 and earlier | Part of the wall was probably designed by Thomas Harrison, and part is earlier. It is built in brick on a sandstone plinth, which is partly replaced in brick, and stands up to 12 feet (3.7 m) high. The wall is on a slope and is stepped to allow for this. |
| 2 Abbey Green; 53.19353°N 2.89238°W | | Early 19th century (probable) | Originally a house, later used as a restaurant, it is built in brick on a stone plinth and has a slate roof. The building is in three storeys, and has a front of four bays. In the middle storey is a Venetian window; apart from one small casement window, the other windows are sashes. |
| 19 City Walls; 53.18705°N 2.88801°W | | Early 19th century (probable) | Originally a house, later used as a hotel, it is in brick with a hipped slate roof. The building is in three storeys with a cellar, and has a two-storey east wing. The left bay was added later, projects forward, and is canted. Seven steps lead up to the doorway, which has pilasters and a fanlight. The windows are sashes. |
| 16 and 18 Cuppin Street; 53.18816°N 2.89232°W | | Early 19th century | A pair of brick houses on stone plinth with a slate roof. They are in three storeys, and each house has a single-bay front. Both doorcases have plain pilasters, a frieze, and a cornice. The windows are sashes with stone sills and wedge lintels. |
| 6 and 8 Eastgate Street and Row; 53.19026°N 2.89128°W | | Early 19th century | A shop with accommodation, in sandstone with a hipped slate roof. It is in four storeys, including an undercroft and a section of Chester Rows. At street level is a modern shop front. At the level of the rows are ornate railings flanked by panelled piers. The top two storeys contain sash windows, those in the top storey having deep sills on corbels. At the top of the building is a cornice and a parapet. |
| 18 Eastgate Street, 18 and 20 Eastgate Row; 53.19036°N 2.89074°W | | Early 19th century (rebuilt) (probable) | A house with an undercroft rebuilt as a shop with accommodation. It is in four storeys, including the undercroft and a section of the Chester Rows. At street level is a modern shop front, with a flight of nine steps leading up to the row. At the level of the row are cast-iron railings and a central Doric column, with a stallboard behind. The upper storeys each contain two sash windows with stone sills and wedge lintels. At the top of the building are a stone cornice and parapet. |
| 19 and 21 Eastgate Street, 29 Eastgate Row; 53.19065°N 2.89043°W | | Early 19th century (rebuilt) | Originally a town house with two undercrofts, this has been converted into shops and an office. It is in four storeys, including a section of the Chester Rows, and has a front of five bays. At street level there are two modern shop fronts, and at the level of the rows are railings and two Tuscan columns with a stallboard behind. The doorways are on the right side in Godstall Lane, and have panelled pilasters, friezes, and cornices. The upper storeys are in brick and contain sash windows, the central ones with architraves and an entablature, the outer ones with wedge lintels. At the top of the building are a stone cornice and parapet. |
| 1 and 1A Grey Friars, 28A Nicholas Street; 53.18842°N 2.89474°W | | Early 19th century (probable) | Three houses, later used for other purposes. They are stuccoed with slate roofs, and have three storeys on Nicholas Street, and two on Grey Friars. The doorway on Grey Friars has an architrave, pilasters, a frieze and a cornice. The windows are sashes, and at the top of the building is a parapet. |
| 16 Grosvenor Street; 53.18797°N 2.89212°W | | Early 19th century | A house later incorporated into a restaurant. It is built in brick with a slate roof, and is in three storeys and a single-bay front. The doorway has pilasters, a frieze, and a cornice hood. The windows are sashes, those in the lower two storeys having wedge lintels. |
| 9 and 9A Lower Bridge Street; 53.18826°N 2.89059°W | | Early 19th century | Originally a house, this was later used as a shop and offices. It is in four storeys, and has a front of one bay. At street level is a modern shop front with a round-arched porch to the right containing twelve steps. The upper storeys are in brick and the roof is slated. In each storey is a sash window with a stone sill and a false wedge lintel. At the top of the building is a cornice. |
| 46, 46A and 46B Lower Bridge Street; 53.18748°N 2.89058°W | | Early 19th century | A shop with accommodation built on the site of a former house with an undercroft, and including a portion of Chester Rows which has been enclosed. The building is in three storeys with a modern shop front at street level, and an arched entry to the right containing 13 steps leading to the rows level. The windows are sashes with stone sills and wedge lintels. At the top of the building is a cornice and a parapet. |
| 3 Nicholas Street Mews; 53.18842°N 2.89537°W | — | Early 19th century | A coachman's cottage, coach houses and stable, later converted into other uses. The buildings are in brick with roofs in slate or corrugated asbestos. The cottage has a doorway and sash windows, and the attached buildings contain carriage openings and pitch holes. |
| 100 and 102 Northgate Street; 53.19301°N 2.89266°W | | Early 19th century | A house with a shop in the ground floor, it is built in brick with a Welsh slate roof. The building is in three storeys, and has a two-bay front. There is a modern shop front in the bottom storey, and above are sash windows. At the top of the building is a moulded cornice. |
| 104–110 Northgate Street; 53.19310°N 2.89273°W | | Early 19th century | A row of four shops in brick with a slate roof. They are in three storeys, and above No. 108 is a plain pediment. In the ground floor are shop fronts, and above are sash windows. |
| 134, 136 and 138 Northgate Street; 53.19373°N 2.89313°W | — | Early 19th century | Commercial properties, in two storeys, built in brick with slate roofs. In the ground floor are shop fronts. The upper storey contains three sash windows with stone sills and wedge lintels. At the top of the building is a parapet. |
| 1 Nuns Road; 53.18881°N 2.89691°W | | Early 19th century | A plastered brick house on a stone plinth with a slate roof. It is in two storeys and has a two-bay front. The doorcase has a frieze and a cornice, and the windows are sashes. At the top of the house is a parapet. |
| 3 Nuns Road; 53.18875°N 2.89683°W | | Early 19th century | A brick house on a sandstone plinth with a plastered south front. The house is in two storeys with a two-bay entrance front. The doorway is semicircular-headed with a fanlight, and the windows are sashes. At the top of the house is an eaves cornice with a Greek key frieze. |
| 25 Watergate Street, 29 Watergate Row; 53.18997°N 2.89273°W | | Early 19th century (rebuilt) | A house on a medieval undercroft, later used as a shop. It is in four storeys, including the undercroft and a section of Chester Rows, and has a single-bay front. At street level is a modern shop front, and at the level of the rows is a cast-iron balustrade. The upper storeys are in brick and each contains one sash window with a wedge lintel. At the top of the building is a moulded cornice. |
| 6 White Friars; 53.18869°N 2.89176°W | | Early 19th century (probable) | A former warehouse in brick with a slate roof. It is in three storeys, and has a three-bay front. In the ground floor is a doorway and a blocked goods entrance with two inserted windows. Centrally in the upper storeys is a blocked loading bay that is flanked by windows in both storeys. |
| 19 and 21 White Friars; 53.18844°N 2.89247°W | | Early 19th century | Two houses, later used as offices, built on medieval sandstone cellars. They are constructed in brick on a rendered plinth, have three storeys, and a front of four bays. The doorways have fanlights and hoods with moulded cornices. The windows are sashes with stone sills and wedge lintels. At the top of the building is a parapet. |
| 26 and 28 Northgate Street; 53.19106°N 2.89148°W | | 1820s | Originally two narrow brick shops, later combined into one shop. At street level there is a modern shop front. Above this, No. 26 is in four storeys, and has a sash window in each storey. At the top is a moulded cornice and a parapet. No. 28 is rendered, is in three storeys, has a replaced window in the second storey, a sash window on the top storey, and a cornice and parapet. |
| Military House; 53.18697°N 2.89224°W | | 1826 | A detached house, later used as an office, built in brick on a stone plinth, with a hipped slate roof. It is in two storeys and has a symmetrical five-bay front. Four steps lead up to a central porch with a wedge lintel, a frieze, a pediment, and a parapet. The windows are sashes with sandstone sills and wedge lintels. At the top of the house is a frieze, a cornice, and a parapet. |
| Model of Grosvenor Bridge; 53.18500°N 2.89367°W | | 1826 (probable) | A scale model of Grosvenor Bridge by Thomas Harrison to demonstrate its design. It is about 5.5 metres (18.0 ft) long and nearly 1 metre (3.3 ft) in length. The model was moved to its present site near Chester city walls in the 1908s. |
| 4–10 Abbey Street; 53.19251°N 2.89090°W | | 1826–28 | A row of four brick houses on a sandstone plinth with a slate roof. They are in three storeys with cellars, and each house has a doorway with fluted pilasters, a plain frieze, a hood cornice, and a fanlight with decorative glazing. The windows are sashes with wedge lintels. |
| 30, 32 and 34 Eastgate Street and Row; 53.19045°N 2.89008°W | | c. 1828 | A shop, later part of a departmental store, in sandstone, partly rendered, with a slate roof. It is in four storeys with an attic, including the undercroft and a section of Chester Rows. The shop has a symmetrical three-bay front with central steps leading from the street to the level of the rows, flanked by steps leading down to the undercroft. At street level is a modern shop front. The steps to the rows are flanked by fluted Doric columns and railings. In the third storey are three French windows, the central one with a pediment, and in the top storey are three sash windows. The attic has a pedimented gable and contains a sash window. |
| Birdbath, garden of St Martin's Lodge; 53.18734°N 2.89499°W | | c. 1829 | The birdbath in his garden was probably designed by Thomas Harrison. It is in sandstone and contains a hemispherical bath. Parts of the structure are carved to resemble drapery. |
| 8 King Street; 53.19305°N 2.89378°W | | c. 1830 (probable) | A rendered house with a slate roof. It is in three storeys with a single-bay front. The doorway has a fanlight, and the windows are sashes. At the top of the house is a moulded cornice. |
| 20 King Street; 53.19301°N 2.89421°W | | c. 1830 (probable) | A brick house on a rendered plinth with a slate roof. It is in three storeys and has a four-bay front. The entrance doorway has a fanlight, pilasters, and an open pediment. To the east is a round-headed entry doorway. The windows are sashes with stone sills and wedge lintels with false keystones. At the top of the house is a parapet frieze and a modillion cornice. |
| 30 Northgate Street and Row; 53.19109°N 2.89151°W | | c. 1830 | A shop with accommodation above, in stuccoed brick with a slate roof. The building is in three storeys. The ground floor contains a modern shop front, with the entry to Music Hall Passage on the right. There is a fluted pilaster on the corner by the passage, and another one at the north end. In the upper floors are sash windows, and at the top of the building is a moulded parapet. |
| 36 and 38 Northgate Street; 53.19123°N 2.89156°W | | 1834 | Two shops, built in brick with a slate roof. They are in three storeys, with modern shop fronts on the ground floor. The windows are sashes, and at the top of the building is a stone cornice. |
| Former Methodist New Connexion Chapel, Pepper Street; 53.18858°N 2.88943°W | | 1834–35 | The chapel was designed by William Cole for the Methodist New Connexion. It has since closed and been used for various purposes. The former chapel is stuccoed and has a slate roof. In the entrance front are four Corinthian columns carrying an entablature with an architrave, a frieze, a dentil cornice, and a pediment. Flanking this are round-arched windows. |
| County Council Education Offices; 53.18653°N 2.89079°W | | 1835 | Originally a parsonage and coachyard, later used as offices. It is in brick on a stone plinth and has slate roofs. The building is in two storeys, and has a six-bay front. It is in Tudor Revival style, with a Georgian rear wing. The windows on the front are casements, and those in the rear wing are sashes. Other features include coped gables with pineapple finials, and dormers. Walls to the south of the building are included in the listing. |
| 17 and 19 Lower Bridge Street; 53.18812°N 2.89052°W | | Early to mid-19th century (rebuilt) | Shops and accommodation built on the site of a house with an undercroft, probably containing some medieval material. The building is in four storeys, it is built in rendered brick, with a slate roof, and has a two-bay front. At street level, under the shop windows, are rows of quatrefoils, and at the sides are pilasters. Each of the upper storeys contains two Gothick style windows containing casements. At the top of the building is a prominent cornice. |
| 45 and 47 Bridge Street, 51, 53 and 55 Bridge Street Row; 53.18915°N 2.89097°W | | Early to mid-19th century | Shops and accommodation, in four storeys, including a section of the Chester Rows, and with a two-bay front. At street level are modern shop fronts. At the level of the row are railings, brick piers, and cast-iron Doric columns, behind which are stallboards. In the third storey is an inserted canted oriel window; the other windows are sashes with stone sills and wedge lintels. |
| Warehouse, Bolland Court; 53.18911°N 2.89246°W | — | Early to mid-19th century | The warehouse is detached, it is built in brick with some sandstone and a slate roof, and probably contains some medieval fabric from the former City Common Hall. It is in four storeys and extends for five bays. The warehouse contains loading bays and windows. The attached wall is included in the listing. |
| 4 and 6 Eastgate Street and Row; 53.19024°N 2.89129°W | | 1830s (probable) | Shops and accommodation above, built in sandstone and brick, and with a hipped slate roof. There are four storeys, including the undercroft and a section of Chester Rows. At street level is a modern shop front with seven steps leading up to the rows level, which has ornate cast-iron railings and a stallboard. In the third floor is a pair of oriel windows, and there are two windows in the top floor. |
| 18 Grosvenor Street; 53.18795°N 2.89214°W | | 1830s (probable) | A brick house on a sandstone plinth, later used as an office. It is in two storeys, with a symmetrical three-bay front. The central stone doorway has pilasters, a frieze, and a cornice. The windows have wedge lintels, and at the top of the house is a brick parapet and a moulded cornice. |
| 1–7 Union Place; 53.18786°N 2.89239°W | — | 1830s (probable) | Four alley houses, later part of a restaurant and office, in brick on a sandstone plinth with a hipped slate roof. They are in three storeys, and each house is in a single bay. The doorways have pilasters, friezes and cornices, and the windows are sashes. |
| 2, 4 and 6 Union Place; 53.18786°N 2.89240°W | — | 1830s (probable) | Formerly a row of terrace houses, later truncated into three, and used for various purposes. They are in brick on a sandstone plinth and have a slate roof. The building is in three storeys, and has a three-bay front. No. 2 has a doorcase with plain pilasters, a frieze, and a cornice; the other doorcases are plain. The windows are sashes, most with wedge lintels. |
| 16 and 18 Black Friars; 53.18775°N 2.89544°W | | c. 1840 | A pair of brick cottages on a stone plinth with a slate roof. They are in two storeys, and each cottage is in a single bay. The doorcases are round-headed with fanlights, and the windows are sashes with stone sills and wedge lintels. |
| 16 King Street; 53.19303°N 2.89409°W | | c. 1840 (rebuilt) | A brick house on a rendered plinth, it is in three storeys, with a single-bay front. At the rear is a two-storey extension. Apart from one casement window at the rear the windows are sashes. |
| 27 King Street; 53.19290°N 2.89493°W | | c. 1840 (probable) | A brick cottage with a slate roof, it is in three storeys with a cellar. The doorway has a plain fanlight, and the windows are sashes. |
| 36 King Street; 53.19302°N 2.89521°W | | c. 1840 (probable) | A brick house on a stone plinth with a slate roof in three storeys. The arched doorcase has four bolection moulded panels with fluted pilasters, and an open pediment with a fanlight. The windows are sashes with stone sills and rusticated wedge lintels and keystones. |
| 54 and 56 Watergate Street and Row; 53.18995°N 2.89376°W | | c. 1840 (rebuilt) | Originally a house with an undercroft, later converted into a shop with accommodation above, it is in four storeys. The former undercroft, at street level, is in sandstone on a plinth, and contains shop windows and a doorway. To the right of this are eleven steps leading up to the level of the former Chester Rows. The upper storeys are in brick and contain sash windows with wedge lintels. At the top of the building is a brick parapet with a slate roof behind. |
| 73 Watergate Street; 53.18966°N 2.89464°W | | c. 1840 | A shop with accommodation with flats at the rear. The building is in brick with slate roofs, and the rear wing is roughcast. The portion facing the street is in three storeys; the rear wing is in a single storey. Facing the street is a modern shop front in the ground floor with sash windows above. |
| 6–14 Black Friars; 53.18782°N 2.89517°W | | Mid-19th century | A row of five brick houses with slate roofs. They are in three storeys, and each house has a single-bay front. Above the doorways are fanlights. The original windows were sashes and most remain; others have modern replacements. |
| Cross, Abbey Square; 53.19244°N 2.89172°W | | 19th century | The cross stands in the centre of the lawn in Abbey Square on a base that is probably from an earlier date. It is in red sandstone, and consists of an octagonal plinth with a two-stepped cap, and a tapering shaft of eight stones. This has a square cornice and carries a simple cross. |
| Artillery stores at Chester Castle; 53.18214°N 2.89919°W | | Mid-19th century | Artillery stores, now used for other purposes. They are of Bunter sandstone ashlar with five arched entrances and sash windows above. |
| 58–66 Watergate Street; 53.18996°N 2.89405°W | | 1852 | A terrace of five houses, later used for a variety of purposes, designed by Edward Hodkinson. They are in brown brick with dressings in blue brick, in stucco, and in sandstone. It has a slate roof, and each house has a gable. The buildings are in four storeys, including the undercroft, and have round-headed pilastered doorways. The windows are sashes. |
| 1–6 Black Friars; 53.18775°N 2.89627°W | | c. 1855 | A house that was altered, expanded, and converted into flats in the 20th century. It is in two storeys, and has a symmetrical west front. There are two canted bay windows, the other windows being sashes. The brick and sandstone wall associated with the house and its garden are included in the listing. |
| 1, 3 and 3 Grosvenor Place; 53.18777°N 2.89159°W | | 1850s (probable) | A row of two cottages and a house built in brick with a hipped slate roof. They are in two storeys; No. 1 has a front of two bays, and the others have a single bay. The doors have keystones and round-headed fanlights decorated with roses and leaf motifs. The windows are sashes. |
| 36 and 38 Eastgate Street, 38 and 40 Eastgate Row; 53.19050°N 2.88995°W | | 1857 | Two shops on the site of earlier houses with undercrofts designed by T. M. Penson. They are timber-framed with plaster panels and have tiled roofs. The shops are in three storeys, including the undercroft and a section of the Chester Rows, and attics. At street level are modern shop fronts, and at the level of the rows are steel railings and a timber balustrade, behind which are stallboards. In the upper storey and attics are decorated windows, and at the top of the shops are carved and pierced bargeboards and finials. |
| St Andrew's Church; 53.18914°N 2.88942°W | | 1857–60 | A redundant church, originally Presbyterian and later United Reformed. It was designed by J. and J. M. Hay, with James Harrison. The church is built in sandstone, partly rendered, with slate roofs. Its entrance front is gabled, and includes an arched doorway, windows, an octagonal bellcote with a stone spire, and a crocketed pinnacle. At the opposite end is a rose window. |
| 40 Bridge Street and Row; 53.18917°N 2.89144°W | | 1858 (largely rebuilt) | The building was designed by James Harrison. It is in four storeys, and includes a section of the Chester Rows. At street level is a modern shop front, and at the level of the rows is a balustrade and a footbridge over Pierpoint Lane. The upper storeys are in brick with stone quoins and windows. In the third storey is a canted oriel window, and in the top floor is a triple-sash window. At the top of the building is a coped gable with an octagonal finial. |
| 51 and 53 Bridge Street, 59 and 59A Bridge Street Row; 53.18901°N 2.89097°W | | 1858 (largely rebuilt) | Offices and shops built on the site of a medieval burgage plot containing a town house with an undercroft and designed by James Harrison. Visible features from the 16th and 17th centuries are still present. The building is in three storeys, and incorporates a section of the Chester Rows. At street level are modern shop fronts, and at the level of the rows are railings, behind which is a stallboard. The top storey is gabled and contains a canted oriel window surrounded by applied timber-framing. The gable has ornate shaped bargeboards and a drop finial. |
| Cenotaph to Matthew Henry; 53.18681°N 2.89342°W | — | 1860 | The cenotaph stands on a roundabout opposite the entrance to Chester Castle, and is the memory of Matthew Henry (1662–1714), a Presbyterian minister and writer. It consists of an obelisk in polished granite with an inscription and a portrait medallion. |
| 6 Shipgate Street; 53.186378°N 2.890161°W | | c. 1860 | A small townhouse, this is built in brick with a slate roof and stone dressings and a sandstone plinth. It is in two storeys with a dormer gable and attic. |
| 8 and 10 Eastgate Street and Row; 53.19027°N 2.89113°W | | c. 1860 (probable) | Shops with accommodation above, in sandstone and timber-framing with a slate roof. It is in four storeys, including the undercroft and a section of Chester Rows. There is a modern shop front at street level. At the level of the rows are ornate railings and a central pillar. The third storey contains a pair of jettied mullioned and transomed windows. In the top storey are two ornate canted six-light oriel windows, above which are jettied gables. |
| 13 and 15 Bridge Street and Row; 53.18998°N 2.89136°W | | 1861 | A shop and accommodation designed by Edward Hodkinson in painted brick with stone dressings. The building is in four storeys, incorporating a section of the Chester Rows, and has a front of a single bay. At the street and rows level are modern shop fronts. The row level has a timber balustrade and a stallboard. In the third storey is a mullioned and transomed window, above which is a pediment. In the top storey is a stepped mullioned window in a gable with three octagonal finials. |
| 12 Eastgate Street and Row; 53.19023°N 2.89096°W | | 1861 (rebuilt) | Shops and ancillary accommodation rebuilt by George Williams on a 13–14th-century two-bay undercroft with applied timber-framing. The building is in four storeys, including the undercroft and a section of the Chester Rows, and an attic, each storey being jettied. From the street ten steps lead centrally up to the rows level, flanked by nine steps down to the undercroft. At street and rows level are modern shop fronts. Fronting the rows level are ornate railings, posts flanking the steps, and a stallboard. In the third storey is a continuous row of eight windows, and in the top storey are four sash windows flanked by panels, themselves flanked by small balconies. The attic also contains four sash windows, and is gabled with ornate bargeboards and finials. |
| 19 and 25 Eastgate Street and Row; 53.19068°N 2.89028°W | | 1861 (rebuilt) | A town house rebuilt as a shop and house, and was designed by T. A Richardson. It is timber-framed at the front, and in brick at the rear. The building is in four storeys with an attic, and incorporates a section of Chester Rows. At street level is a modern shop front, and at the rows level are ornate railings, two pillars, and a stallboard. In the third storey is a canted mullioned and transomed oriel window. The central bay of the top storey is jettied and gabled. Flanking the gable are small gabled dormers. |
| 51 Eastgate Street and Row; 53.19112°N 2.88907°W | — | 1861 (rebuilt) | This was built as a social club for the Honourable Incorporation of the King's Arms Kitchen, which was wound up in 1896. It has since been converted into offices, and later used as an enterprise centre. The building is constructed in brick with sandstone dressings, and has a slate roof. It is in three storeys with an attic with gables, and there is direct access to it from the city walls across a short stone bridge. Most of the windows are sashes. |
| St Francis' Church; 53.18768°N 2.89261°W | | 1862–75 | A Roman Catholic church designed initially by Benjamin Bucknell, and completed by James O'Byrne. It is built in sandstone and has slate roofs. At the west end is a porch with double doors, above which is a niche containing a statue of Saint Francis. Inside the church is a west gallery, and reredoses behind the high altar and the altars of the side chapels. |
| Grosvenor Hotel; 53.19063°N 2.88914°W | | 1863–66 | The hotel was designed by T. M. Penson and built to replace earlier hotels on the site. It is in four storeys with attics and a basement, the upper two storeys being timber-framed (probably applied) with plaster panels. Along the ground floor is a nine-bay colonnade. The second storey is in brick with stone dressings. Some of the windows are mullioned and transomed; others are sashes. At the top of the hotel are gables and dormers, and at the corners are tourelles with spires. |
| 41 Bridge Street and Row; 53.18924°N 2.89101°W | | 1864 (rebuilt) | A shop with a medieval undercroft in four storeys including the undercroft and a section of Chester Rows. In the ground floor is a modern shop front, and there is a balcony at rows level. The upper storeys are timber framed and have a gable with decorative bargeboards and a finial. |
| 43, 45 and 47 Bridge Street and Row; 53.18931°N 2.89100°W | | 1864 | Shops with accommodation designed by Edward Hodkinson for the 2nd Marquess of Westminster. They are built in red brick with blue brick diapering, stone dressings and a slate roof. The shops are in four storeys, incorporating a section of the Chester Rows, and have a symmetrical three-bay front. At street level are modern shop fronts, and at the level of the rows are cast-iron railings and two pillars. In the upper storeys are sash windows, and at the top of the building are three gables with an octagonal finial. |
| 45A, 45B and 47A Bridge Street; 53.18938°N 2.89051°W | — | c. 1864 | A row of three houses in an L-shaped plan, built in brick with slate roofs in late Georgian style. They are in three storeys, and have sash windows. |
| Guildhall; 53.18986°N 2.89483°W | | 1865–69 | This originated as Holy Trinity Church, and was built to replace an earlier church on the site. It was designed by James Harrison and completed after his death. The church closed in 1960 and has been converted into the Guildhall. It is constructed in sandstone and has slate roofs. The plan consists of a continuous nave and chancel, aisles, a south vestry, a west porch, and a southwest steeple. |
| Thomas Gould Tombstone; 53.18707°N 2.89331°W | — | c. 1866 | The tombstone is in the Grosvenor Street roundabout and is to the memory of a soldier with a career of 46 years. It is in sandstone and consists of a casket lid inscribed with the names of the conflicts in which he fought. |
| Albion Mews; 53.18789°N 2.88872°W | | 1868 | Designed by James Harrison as a drill hall, it was converted into flats in the 20th century. It is built in brick, with stone dressings, a slate roof, and a Mansard roof added later. At the east end is a three-storey castellated gatehouse tower with an archway, panels with blank shields, windows, and a small turret in the top storey. The west wing is in two storeys, and is also castellated. |
| Old Custom House; 53.18978°N 2.89488°W | | 1868 (rebuilt) | Originally the custom house of the Port of Chester. it has been converted into other uses. The building is constructed in brick with a slate roof, it is in two storeys and has a three-bay front. The doorway and windows have Bath stone surrounds with quoins and hood moulds, and with brick voussoirs in alternating colours. At the top of the building is a stone parapet, with pierced quatrefoils and a tall centrepiece with a relief of the Royal Arms. |
| 60–68 Lower Bridge Street, 2–6 Gamul Terrace; 53.18702°N 2.89027°W | | 1872 | A row of five shops with cottages above, designed by T. Fluitt. They are in three storeys, the bottom storey containing projecting shops and an entry to Gamul Place. The cottages occupy the upper storeys, and have a walkway in front of them. They are in brick with stone dressings and a slate roof, each cottage having a front of one bay. Their doorways have fanlights, and the windows are sashes. |
| 1–6 Gamul Place; 53.18701°N 2.89056°W | — | 1872 | A row of six court cottages built in brick with a slate roof. They are in two storeys, and each cottage has a front of a single bay. The windows are horizontally sliding sashes. |
| Coach and Horses public house 53.19203°N 2.89263°W | | 1872 | A public house designed by Kelly and Edwards in three storeys. It stands on a corner site with gables on both of the sides facing streets. The top storeys and gables are jettied. The lower two storeys are in brick with sandstone dressings, and the upper parts are timber-framed with plaster panels. The windows are mullioned and transomed. |
| 20 Bridge Street, 16 and 18 Bridge Street Row; 53.18977°N 2.89160°W | | 1873 | A shop with accommodation, built probably on the site of two medieval houses with undercrofts. It was designed by T. M. Lockwood, and is in four storeys with an attic, including a section of the Chester Rows. At shop level is a modern shop front and steps leading up to the rows. At the level of the rows is a timber balustrade with two octagonal posts. The storeys above the rows and the attic are jettied. In the third storey is a canted oriel window with pargeted sub-panels flanked by cross-windows. In the top storey, above the oriel window, is a timber balcony, over which is a gabled attic with arched bargeboards and a weathervane. |
| 11–17 Bunce Street; 53.18735°N 2.89186°W | | 1874 | A row of five cottages, later converted into four, built in brown brick with blue brick diapering and a slate roof. The cottages are in two storeys, and each original cottage has a single-bay front. The windows are sashes. Above the central cottage is a gable, and there is a corbelled gablet above the north bay. |
| 15 and 17 St Werburgh Street; 53.19125°N 2.89018°W | | 1874 | A shop designed by John Douglas; it is in two storeys, stands on a corner site, and has a triangular plan. The lower storey is in brick with stone dressings, and contains a shop window, and a doorway with a carved stone lintel. The upper floor is timber-framed with plaster panels, and contains a mullioned and transomed window, above which is a gable containing pargeting. To the right of this are two three-light windows. |
| 19–27 St Werburgh Street; 53.19124°N 2.89040°W | | 1874 | A row of five shops designed by John Douglas. They are timber-framed with herring-bone brick nogging and some plaster panels, and have tiled roofs. On the ground floor, all the shops have modern fronts. The upper storeys protrude towards street and are supported by a colonnade of seven timber posts set on sandstone plinths. No. 19 is in three storeys and the others have two storeys. Each shop has a gable, two of which are pargeted. |
| 44 Bridge Street and Row; 53.18906°N 2.89142°W | | Late 19th century (rebuilt) | This was rebuilt as an extension to a departmental store. It is in brick and sandstone with a slate roof. The building is in five storeys, including the undercroft and a portion of the Chester Rows. In the undercroft and rows levels are modern shop fronts. At the rows level are cast-iron Doric columns and wrought iron railings. The upper storeys contain sash windows, and at the top of the building is a gable. |
| 46 Bridge Street and Row; 53.18894°N 2.89134°W | | Late 19th century (rebuilt) | This was rebuilt as part of a departmental store, replacing a house dating from about 1780. It is in four storeys, including a section of the Chester Rows. At street level are modern shop fronts, and at the level of the rows are wrought iron railings and sandstone piers. The upper storeys are in brick with rusticated quoins, and in each storey are six sash windows with stone sills and rusticated lintels and keystones. At the top of the building is a stone cornice with dentils and modillions, and a brick parapet. |
| 14 Eastgate Street and Row; 53.19032°N 2.89088°W | | Late 19th century (rebuilt) | A shop and storage accommodation built on the site of a former house. It is in four storeys, including the undercroft and a section of Chester Rows, with an attic. At street level is a modern shop front, and at the front of the rows is a rail of turned balusters, behind which is a stallboard. Above this the building is timber-framed, and contains canted oriels with mullioned and transomed windows. The gable is jettied, and has moulded bargeboards and a drop finial. |
| 24 Eastgate Street, 30 Eastgate Row; 53.19041°N 2.89053°W | | Late 19th century (rebuilt) | Originally a house with an undercroft, later shops and accommodation. The front is timber-framed with plaster panels, and the back of the building is in brick. It is in three storeys with an attic, and includes a section of the Chester Rows. At street level there are two modern shop fronts, and at the level of the rows is a kiosk. The top storey and attic are jettied. The top storey contains two canted oriels with mullioned and transomed windows. The attic is gabled and has two casement windows, moulded bargeboards and a finial. |
| 19A King Street; 53.19290°N 2.89448°W | | Late 19th century (probable) | A warehouse and storeroom in three storeys. The bottom storey is in rusticated stone, the upper storeys are in brick, and the roof is slated. On the ground floor are three segmentally arched openings with voussoirs. The left arch contains double vehicle doors, the middle has a sash window, and at the right are showroom doors. In the upper floors are hoppers. At the rear of the building are attached two-storey extensions for storage. |
| Wall and railings, Abbey Square; 53.19220°N 2.89161°W | | Late 19th century (probable) | The railings are from this date, and the wall is earlier. The wall is in sandstone and is weathered. The railings are in iron and have fleur-de-lys and foliar heads. |
| Barclays Bank; 53.19190°N 2.89160°W | | 1875–77 | Originally part of King's School, the building has since had various uses, including a bank. It was designed by A. W. Blomfield, and is built in sandstone with a tiled roof. It is in two storeys with an attic. Above the entrance is a two-storey canted bay window. Other features include mullioned and transomed windows, a crenellated parapet, and timber dormers with gables. |
| Magistrate's Court; 53.19194°N 2.89187°W | | 1875–77 | Originally part of King's School, the building has since had various uses, including a bank. It was designed by A. W. Blomfield, and is built in sandstone with a tiled roof. It is in two storeys and has a front of seven bays. Its features include mullioned and transomed windows, gargoyles, and a crenellated parapet. |
| 4 Park Street; 53.18852°N 2.88813°W | | 1881 | Originally a house designed by W. H. Kelly, and used later for a dental practice. The building is in three storeys, it has a front of two bays and a slated roof. The ground floor is in brick, and contains a doorway with a fanlight, a recessed canted mullioned and transomed bay window to the left, and a carriage entry to the right. The upper storeys are timber-framed with plaster panels, they are jettied, and contain windows and plaster cartouches. Between the storeys are decorated bressumers, one with an inscription. At the top of the building are two gables with carved bargeboards and drop finials. |
| Grosvenor Club and North and South Wales Bank; 53.19087°N 2.88891°W | | 1881–83 | This was designed as a gentlemen's club and bank by Douglas and Fordham, and was extended in 1908. It is in three storeys with attics. The lowest storey is in sandstone, and the upper parts are in brick with diapering and stone dressings; it is roofed with Westmorland slate. Its features include mullioned windows, a canted oriel window, two spires with lead finials, a shaped gable, a belfry with a pyramidal roof and a finial, a frieze containing coats of arms, and separately, the Grosvenor arms. |
| Queen's School; 53.19097°N 2.89746°W | | 1881–83 | The school was designed by E. A. Ould in Vernacular Revival style. It is built in Ruabon brick with terracotta dressings and tiled roofs, and has an L-shaped plan. The wing facing City Walls Road contains the school hall, and the north face contains the dining hall and kitchen. On the west front are a gabled wing in two storeys with an attic, three lower gables, and a castellated projection. On the roof is a small turret with a spire. |
| White Friars Cottage (east part); 53.18862°N 2.89217°W | | 1884 (rebuilt) | A cottage built on cellars that are probably medieval; it was extended in 1972. It is in two storeys with an attic. The ground floor is in brick, and the upper parts are timber-framed. Most of the windows are mullioned and transomed casements. On the south face is an oriel window above which is a jettied gable. The east front contains a sandstone doorcase with a Tudor arched head. Above this at the top of the house is a cornice carried on shaped brackets, and a gabled dormer. |
| Grosvenor Museum; 53.18726°N 2.89245°W | | 1885 | The museum was designed by T. M. Lockwood and built on land given by the 1st Duke of Westminster. It is constructed in Ruabon brick with stone dressings and has a tiled roof. The museum is in three storeys with a basement, and its features include a corner oriel window rising to a tourelle with a cupola, shaped gables, and a balustraded parapet. |
| 8 and 10 Lower Bridge Street; 53.18823°N 2.89090°W | | 1886 | A shop designed by E. A. Ould in painted brick and timber-framing with plaster panels and a slate roof. The shop is in two storeys, and has a symmetrical front with two gables. There is a central doorway flanked by shop windows. The upper storey is jettied, and contains two six-light mullioned casement windows. |
| 24 and 26 Commonhall Street; 53.18937°N 2.89285°W | — | 1889 | A pair of cottages designed by T. M. Lockwood for the use of the staff of Browns of Chester. They are built in brown brick with red brick dressings and tiled roofs, and are in two storeys. The ground floor of each cottage has a doorway, that of No. 26 being angled, and a mullioned casement window. In the upper storey are oriel windows in timber-framed gabled dormers. |
| 31 Eastgate Street, 25 Eastgate Row; 53.19069°N 2.89001°W | | 1889 (rebuilt) | Shops and offices built on the site of a previous house with an undercroft, designed by T. M. Lockwood. It is in four storeys with an attic, including the undercroft and a section of the Chester Rows. At street level is a modern shop front, and at the level of the row is a timber balustrade with sandstone end-piers, behind which is a stallboard. The upper part of the building is timber-framed, with both storeys and the attic jettied. In the third storey is a full-width mullioned and transomed window, the middle part forming an oriel window. The top floor contains a bay window flanked by balconies. In the attic is another oriel window, and the gable has moulded bargeboards. |
| 2–5 Old Hall Place; 53.18954°N 2.89299°W | — | c. 1889 | A row of four cottages designed by T. M. Lockwood for the use of the staff of Browns of Chester. They are built in brick with tiled roofs, and are in two storeys. The ground floor of each cottage has a doorway and a mullioned casement window. Above the doors of Nos. 2 and 5 are canopies. Each cottage has an oriel window in the upper storey in a timber-framed dormer gable. |
| 3, 5, and 7 Bridge Street and Row; 53.19010°N 2.89145°W | | 1889–90 (rebuilt) | Three shops designed by W. M. Boden, built in Ruabon brick, cast iron and timber-framing, with tiled roofs. They are in four storeys, including undercrofts and a section of the Chester Rows, and are in three symmetrical bays. At street level are modern shop fronts, and at the level of the rows is a balustrade and columns, with a stallboard behind. In the third storey are three canted five-light mullioned oriel windows, surrounded by brick, under which are decorated panels. The top storey is jettied, the middle bay projecting, with each bay containing an oriel window surrounded by timber framing. Above these are three gables with bargeboards and a central shaped finial. |
| 35 Watergate Street, 43 Watergate Row; 53.18990°N 2.89317°W | | 1890 (rebuilt) | A shop on the site of a former house and undercroft, rebuilt possibly by T. M. Lockwood. It is in three storeys, including a section of the Chester Rows, and has a single-bay front. At street level is a modern shop front, and at the level of the row is a rail with barley-sugar balusters, and a stallboard behind. Above this is a bressumer and an inscribed fascia. In the top storey is a projecting seven-light mullioned and transomed casement window. At the top is a gable with bargeboards and an ornate finial. |
| 49 Bridge Street, 57 Bridge Street Row; 53.18906°N 2.89098°W | | 1891 (rebuilt) | Shops and offices built on the site of a former house and undercroft, designed by W. M. Boden. It is in four storeys, including the undercroft, and contains a section of the Chester Rows. At street level is a modern shop front and a covered entry to Feathers Lane on the left. At rows level are timber railings between sandstone piers. The next storey is in brick and contains a canted oriel window, with a small casement window to the left. The top floor is timber-framed and jettied, and contains an oriel window. The gable has moulded bargeboards and a shaped finial. |
| 37 Eastgate Street; 53.19082°N 2.88950°W | | 1892 | A shop with accommodation designed by Charles A. Ewing. It is timber-framed and in four storeys with attics, each storey being jettied. In the ground floor is a modern shop front. The second storey contains two oriel windows with a balcony between. The third and fourth storeys have full-length balconies. In the attic is a four-light casement window above which is a gable with elaborate bargeboards and a pinnacled finial. |
| Cross Keys public house 53.18669°N 2.88945°W | | 1894 (rebuilt) | A public house designed by W. M. Boden. It is built in Ruabon brick that is partly pebbledashed, with stone dressings, and has a roof in slate and sandstone. The public house is in three storeys and cellars. Its features include a porch flanked by columns, mullioned and transomed windows, an oriel window, and timber-framed gables. The raised forecourt in front of the building is included in the listing. |
| 38 Bridge Street, 36 and 38 Bridge Street Row; 53.18926°N 2.89146°W | | 1897 | Shops designed by Douglas and Fordham in three storeys, including a section of the Chester Rows. Flanking the two lower storeys are sandstone piers. Facing Bridge Street at street level is a modern shop front, and at the level of the rows is a balustrade with two pillars. The third storey is jettied and timber-framed. It contains two canted oriel windows, and a small casement window to the right. Above these is a jettied gable with a carved tie-beam and shaped and pierced bargeboards. The front facing Pierpoint Lane is partly in brick and partly timber-framed, and contains casement windows. |
| St Oswald's Chambers; 53.19137°N 2.89006°W | | 1898 | Offices, later a shop, designed by John Douglas, in two storeys with a rear wing. The lower storey is in sandstone with Ruabon brick at the rear, the upper storey is timber-framed, and the roof is of Westmorland slate. On the front is a doorway with a mullioned and transomed window to the left and a shop window to the right. The upper storey contains casement windows; above each window on the front is a dormer gable with a carved bargeboard. On the corner of the building is a short octagonal spire with a finial and a weather vane. |
| 7 Grosvenor Street; 53.18823°N 2.89135°W | | 1898 | Former nurses' home, later a WRVS office, designed by Douglas and Minshull for Hugh Grosvenor, 1st Duke of Westminster. In Vernacular Revival style in diapered Ruabon brick with a Westmorland slate roof. It is of two and three storeys, with four bays, on an ashlar sandstone plinth. It has mullioned and transomed windows under basket-arched heads. Inside are original fireplaces and doors with reeded stiles, rails and muntins. |
| 3 Northgate Street; 53.19070°N 2.89157°W | | 1898–99 | This was designed by H. W. Beswick in Vernacular Revival style, and consists of a shop with the dining room of the Chester City Club above. It is timber-framed with pebbledashing, and has a slate roof. The ground floor contains a modern shop front. The upper floor and the gable above are both jettied; the former contains a nine-light mullioned and transomed window, the central five lights forming an oriel window. There is pargeting in the panels above the outer lights. The gable has a three-light window, ornate bargeboards, and a finial. |
| 30 Bridge Street, 28 Bridge Street Row; 53.18953°N 2.89153°W | | 1900 | A shop designed by Douglas and Minshull, replacing a public house named the Rose and Crown. It was initially a public house named the Grotto, and was converted into a shop in the 1890s. The shop is in three storeys with cellars, including a section of the Chester Rows, the lower two storeys being in sandstone and the top storey timber-framed with plaster panels; the roof is slated. At street level is a modern shop front, and at the level of the rows is a timber balustrade, behind which is a stallboard. The top storey is jettied and contains casement windows. Above the two right windows is a jettied gable with a bargeboard and a finial. In the front facing Commonhall Street is an oriel window. |
| 11–13 Northgate Street; 53.19087°N 2.89170°W | | 1900 | A shop designed by John Douglas in two storeys with a two-bay front. At street level is a two-bay arcade behind which are modern shop fronts. The building above this is timber-framed with plaster panels, and contains two bowed oriel windows. The gables are jettied with carved bargeboards. At the rear is a brick wing with casement windows. |
| 19 Northgate Street; 53.19104°N 2.89175°W | | c. 1900 (rebuilt) | A shop built on the site of a medieval house with an undercroft, which has retained some medieval masonry. It was designed probably by John Douglas. It is in three storeys with a cellar, and has a three-bay front; the upper two storeys are timber-framed with plaster panels. The ground floor is part of an arcade, behind which is a modern shop front. The middle storey is supported by three Tuscan columns in painted sandstone; this storey contains an oriel window, the central part of which is bowed. The top storey is jettied, and contains two canted oriel windows. At the top is a gable with moulded bargeboards. |
| 15–17 Northgate Street; 53.19097°N 2.89168°W | | 1909 | A shop built on two medieval undercrofts, on one of which was an inn. The shop was designed by James Strong, it is in three storeys, and has a three-bay front. At street level is an arcade, behind which are modern shop fronts. The upper parts of the building are timber-framed. In the second storey are two oriel windows containing mullioned and transomed casements. The top storey is jettied and contains three hipped half-dormers. |
| Old Fire Station; 53.19344°N 2.89329°W | | 1911 | The fire station was designed by James Strong, and later converted for other uses. The building is in two storeys. In the ground floor the former fire engine entrances have been converted into a doorway and windows; these are flanked by sandstone piers. The upper storey is timber-framed and contains three half-round oriel windows surrounded by panels. Above these are three jettied gables. |
| 40, 42 and 44 Eastgate Street, 42–48 Eastgate Row; 53.19056°N 2.88975°W | | 1912 | A row of three shops and offices built on the site of previous shops with undercrofts, designed by W. T. Lockwood. They are in four storeys, including the undercrofts and a section of Chester Rows, and have a front of three bays. At the levels of the street and the row are modern shop fronts. The upper part of the building is timber-framed and each storey is jettied. The third storey contains three mullioned and transomed oriel windows, and in the top floor are mullioned casement windows. The gable is jettied and has plain bargeboards. |
| 12 and 14 Northgate Street, 10 and 12 Northgate Row; 53.19075°N 2.89131°W | | 1912–13 (rebuilt) (probable) | Shops built on the site of two medieval houses with undercrofts. They are timber-framed with a shingle Mansard roof. The building is in four storeys with attics, incorporating a section of the Chester Rows, and has a two-bay front. At street level are two modern shop fronts, with a flight of steps leading up to the rows on the right. At the level of the rows is an ornamental balustrade with a stallboard behind it. The upper storeys and attics are jettied. The third and fourth storeys each contain two canted oriel windows. The attics are gabled and contain cross-windows. |
| 16 Northgate Street, 14 and 16 Northgate Row; 53.19085°N 2.89141°W | | c. 1913 (rebuilt) | The building contains fragments of a Roman hypocaust, and was built on the site of two medieval houses with undercrofts. It is timber-framed with a slate roof, and has four storeys, including the undercrofts and a section of the Chester Rows. At street level are modern shop fronts, and at the level of the rows is a balustrade. The upper two storeys are jettied and contain windows. |
| Chester War Memorial; 53.19159°N 2.89086°W | | 1922 | The war memorial was designed by Frederick Crossley and Thomas Rayson. It is built in sandstone, and consists of a hexagonal base of four steps with a plinth carrying a cross. The plinth contains carvings in niches of six saints. The steps carry inscriptions, including one added after the Second World War. |
| 52 Watergate Street; 53.18997°N 2.89368°W | | Early 20th century (rebuilt) (probable) | A shop built on the site of a former house with an undercroft. It is built in brick with a slate roof, and has three storeys. In the ground floor is a modern shop front. Both storeys above contain two sash windows with stone sills and wedge lintels. At the top of the building is a gable. |
| St Werburgh Row and Clemence House; 53.19150°N 2.89131°W | | 1935 | A row of shop and offices in one, two and three storeys designed by Maxwell Ayrton. Along the front is a recessed 14-bay colonnade carried on Roman Doric columns. Above the ground floor the building is rendered, and there are two gables. The windows are casements. At the north end is Clemence House, which has a sandstone front with two round-arched openings and a mullioned and transomed window. |
| Telephone kiosks 53.19145°N 2.89199°W | | 1935 | A pair of K6 type telephone kiosks, designed by Giles Gilbert Scott. Constructed in cast iron with a square plan and a dome, they have three unperforated crowns in the top panels. |
| Chester House; 53.19089°N 2.89143°W | | 1936 (rebuilt) | Rebuilt as a gas showroom on the site of a medieval house with an undercroft, and later converted for other uses. It is expressed as a timber-framed building, and is in three storeys with an attic. The bottom storey contains a modern shop front. Above this each storey is jettied. The middle storey contains a square mullioned and transomed oriel window. There are casement windows in the top storey and attic, which has bargeboards and a finial. |
| Odeon Buildings and Cinema; 53.19262°N 2.89290°W | | 1936 | The former cinema and five shops were designed by Robert Bullivant in the style of Harry Weedon. The buildings are constructed on a steel frame on reinforced piers and clad in brick; they have tiled roofs. They stand on a prominent corner site, and on the corner is a tower with three tall, narrow windows. Inside are Art Deco features. |
| Newgate; 53.18902°N 2.88819°W | | 1937–38 | A sandstone archway carrying the city walls over Pepper Street, designed by Sir Walter Tapper and his son, Michael. It is flanked by towers with mock loops and stone hip roofs. Steps carry the footpath over the road. The archway is decorated with shields and Tudor roses. |
| 50 Eastgate Street and Row; 53.19058°N 2.88959°W | | 1963–65 (rebuilt) | This was completely rebuilt replacing the former front with a facsimile of the former Georgian front. This is in four storeys, and contains a section of the Chester Rows, which descend to street level at the east end. In the ground floor are piers and intermediate columns in Doric style. The upper part of the building is in brick with a slate roof and rusticated quoins. There are sash windows in all the upper storeys, and at the top of the building is a shaped gable with moulded stone coping and a pineapple finial. |
| 13 Bridge Place; 53.18633°N 2.88902°W | | c. 1970 (rebuilt) | Originally a house, later a shop with living accommodation, it is built in brick with a hipped slate roof. The house is in three storeys and has a single-bay front. Three steps lead up to a pedimented doorway, and to the right of this is a bow window. The other windows are sashes. |
| Addleshaw Tower; 53.19157°N 2.88938°W | | 1973–75 | The tower is the free-standing bell-tower of Chester Cathedral. It was designed by George Pace in Modernist style, and is named after the dean of the cathedral at the time. It has a square plan, is 85 feet (26 m) high, and is constructed on a reinforced concrete frame. The base is faced with sandstone and the upper parts in Bethesda slates on a timber frame. The tower contains a ring of twelve bells. |
| 49 Watergate Street, 55 and 57 Watergate Row; 53.18983°N 2.89363°W | | 1970s (rebuilt) | Shops and accommodation built on the site of a medieval house with an undercroft, with some medieval fragments remaining. It is in four storeys, including the former undercroft and a section of the Chester Rows. At street level is a modern shop front, and at the level of the row are railings. The upper parts are timber-framed with plaster panels. |
| 1, 3 and 5 Cuppin Street, 14 Grosvenor Street; 53.18806°N 2.89223°W | | Undated | Originally four houses, two of which have been converted into a restaurant. They are built in brick on a sandstone plinth, and are in three storeys. On the front facing Grosvenor Street the lower storey is the restaurant. The front facing Cuppin Street contains three doorways with pilasters, friezes, and cornices. The windows are sashes, those in the first and second floors having stone sills and wedge lintels. |

== See also ==
- Grade I listed buildings in Cheshire West and Chester
- Grade II* listed buildings in Cheshire West and Chester
- Grade II listed buildings in Chester (north and west)
- Grade II listed buildings in Chester (east)
- Grade II listed buildings in Chester (south)
