= Ye Olde Edgar =

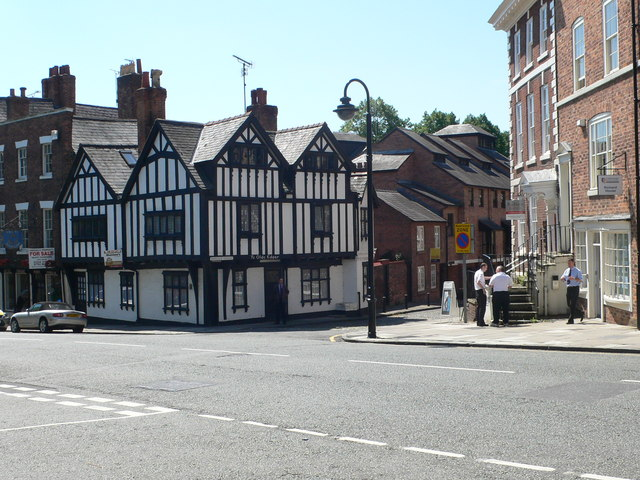
- Ye Olde Edgar

- Location in Cheshire
- 53.1865°N 2.8898°W
- Location: 86 and 88 Lower Bridge Street, Chester
- OS grid reference: SJ 406 659

Listed Building – Grade II
- Designated: 28 July 1955
- Reference no.: 1376316

Ye Olde Edgar is at 86 and 88 Lower Bridge Street, on the corner of Shipgate Street, Chester, Cheshire. England. It is recorded in the National Heritage List for England as a designated Grade II listed building.

== History ==
The building dates probably from the late 16th century. It was originally two houses that were later combined as an inn, and have since been converted back into two houses.

== Architecture ==
It has basically a timber-framed structure, part of which has been replaced in brick. Its panels are plastered, and it is roofed in grey slate. The building is in two storeys, with two bays facing each street. The lower storey is mainly in painted brick, with brackets supporting the jettied upper storey. The side facing Lower Bridge Street contains three casement windows, and that facing Shipgate Street has two similar windows and a doorway. The upper storey is timber-framed, with close studding. On the side facing Lower Bridge Street are two five-light mullioned windows, above which are two blank gables; that facing Shipgate Street has two two-light mullioned windows, above which are two gables, each containing a four-light mullioned window. The rear of the building is clad in brick.

== Name ==
It is thought that the name commemorates King Edgar who visited Chester in 973.

== See also ==
- Grade II listed buildings in Chester (central)
