= Nine Houses, Chester =

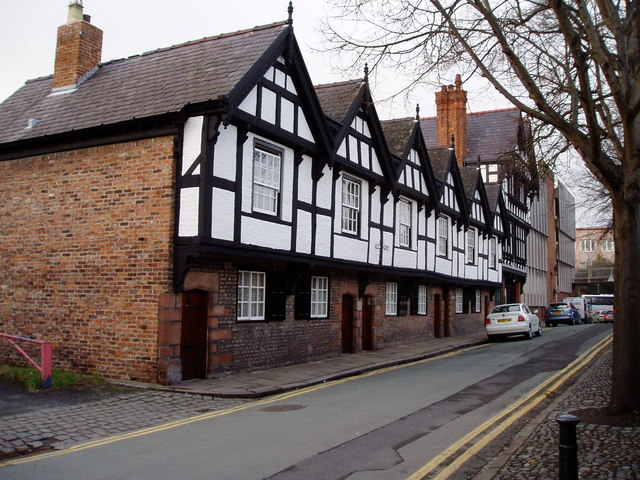
- Nine Houses, Chester

- Location in Cheshire
- 53.1884°N 2.8881°W
- Location: Park Street, Chester, Cheshire, England
- OS grid reference: SJ 408 661

History
- Built: c. 1650

Site notes
- Restored: 1968–69
- Restored by: Chester City Council

Listed Building – Grade II
- Designated: 28 July 1955
- Reference no.: 1376376

The Nine Houses, of which only six remain, are in Park Street, Chester, Cheshire, England. The row of houses is recorded in the National Heritage List for England as a designated Grade II listed building. They face the eastern portion of Chester city walls.

== History ==
The houses are the only surviving pre-19th-century almshouses in Chester. They were built in about 1650. By the 1960s the houses were in a dilapidated state and were in danger of collapse. There were campaigns to preserve them led by the Chester Civic Trust and the Chester Archaeological Society. A report was prepared by the Society for the Protection of Ancient Buildings, following which they were renovated and rebuilt by Chester City Council in 1968–69. The end wall had to be repaired in old brick, and the rear wall was completely rebuilt.

== Architecture ==
The surviving row consists of six adjoined cottages in two storeys. Each cottage consists of a single bay. The lower storey is constructed in brick on a low sandstone plinth, with stone dressings around the entrance doorways that contain oak-boarded doors. The upper storey is timber-framed and jettied, and has a gable that is jettied further. In the lower storey of each cottage is a 12-pane, horizontally sliding sash window. Each upper storey contains a 16-pane, vertically sliding sash window.

== See also ==
- Grade II listed buildings in Chester (central)
