= St Oswald's Chambers, Chester =

St Oswald's Chambers
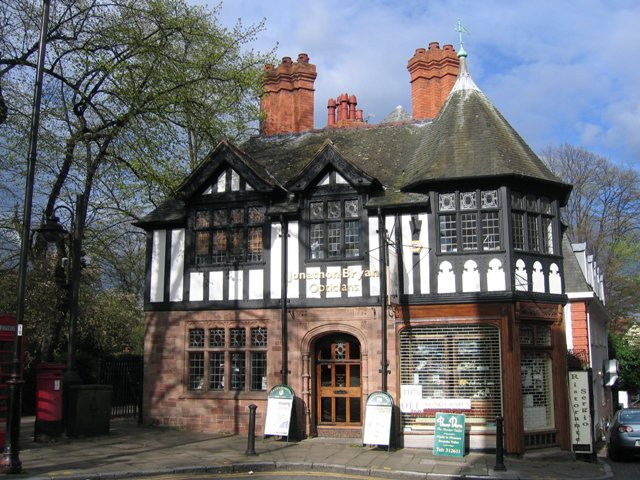
- St Oswald's Chambers

- Location in Cheshire
- 53.1914°N 2.8900°W
- Location: 20–22 St Werburgh Street, Chester, Cheshire, England

History
- Built: 1898

Site notes
- Architect: John Douglas

Listed Building – Grade II
- Designated: 23 May 1967
- Reference no.: 1376392

St Oswald's Chambers consists of a commercial property at 20–22 St Werburgh Street, Chester, Cheshire, England. It is recorded in the National Heritage List for England as a designated Grade II listed building.

== History ==
The building was designed by local architect John Douglas and built in 1898. St Werburgh Street had been widened in the mid-1890s, and Douglas designed a terrace that was built around 1895–97, which consisted of shops and a bank on the east side of the street, numbered 2–18. Widening the street had opened up the view of Chester Cathedral from Eastgate Street, but beyond the terrace the view was partly obscured by structures belonging to the business of Dicksons, seed merchants and nurserymen. Douglas purchased the site to the north of the terrace and designed St Oswald's Chambers to be built in line with the terrace, and in a similar style, to enhance the view towards the cathedral.

As of 2008, the building was occupied by an opticians' practice.

== Architecture ==
St Oswald's Chambers is constructed in two storeys with a rear wing. The upper storey is entirely timber-framed; the main part of the lower storey is in red sandstone, and the lower storey of the wing is in red Ruabon brick. The roof is of Westmorland green slate. The main front of the building is on St Werburgh Street and faces west; a canted corner leads to the south front in a side street. In the centre of the main front is an arched doorway with the date in the spandrels of the arch. Above it is a panel inscribed with the name of the building. To the left of the door is a mullioned and transomed window and to the right is a shop window. In the corner is the door leading into the shop. The upper storey contains two casement windows; that to the left has four lights and the other has three. Above each window is a dormer gable, each with a richly carved bargeboard. On the corner, above the doorway, is a nine-light casement window, with three lights on each front and the other three lights across the corner. Over this is a short octagonal spire, topped by a finial and a weather vane. The south face has a two-light window in the lower storey and a three-light window above. On the north side are one three-light and three four-light windows in each storey. The rear wing has two casement windows in each storey. Three shaped brick chimneys rise from the roof.

== See also ==
- Grade II listed buildings in Chester (central)
- List of non-ecclesiastical and non-residential works by John Douglas
