= Park House, Chester =

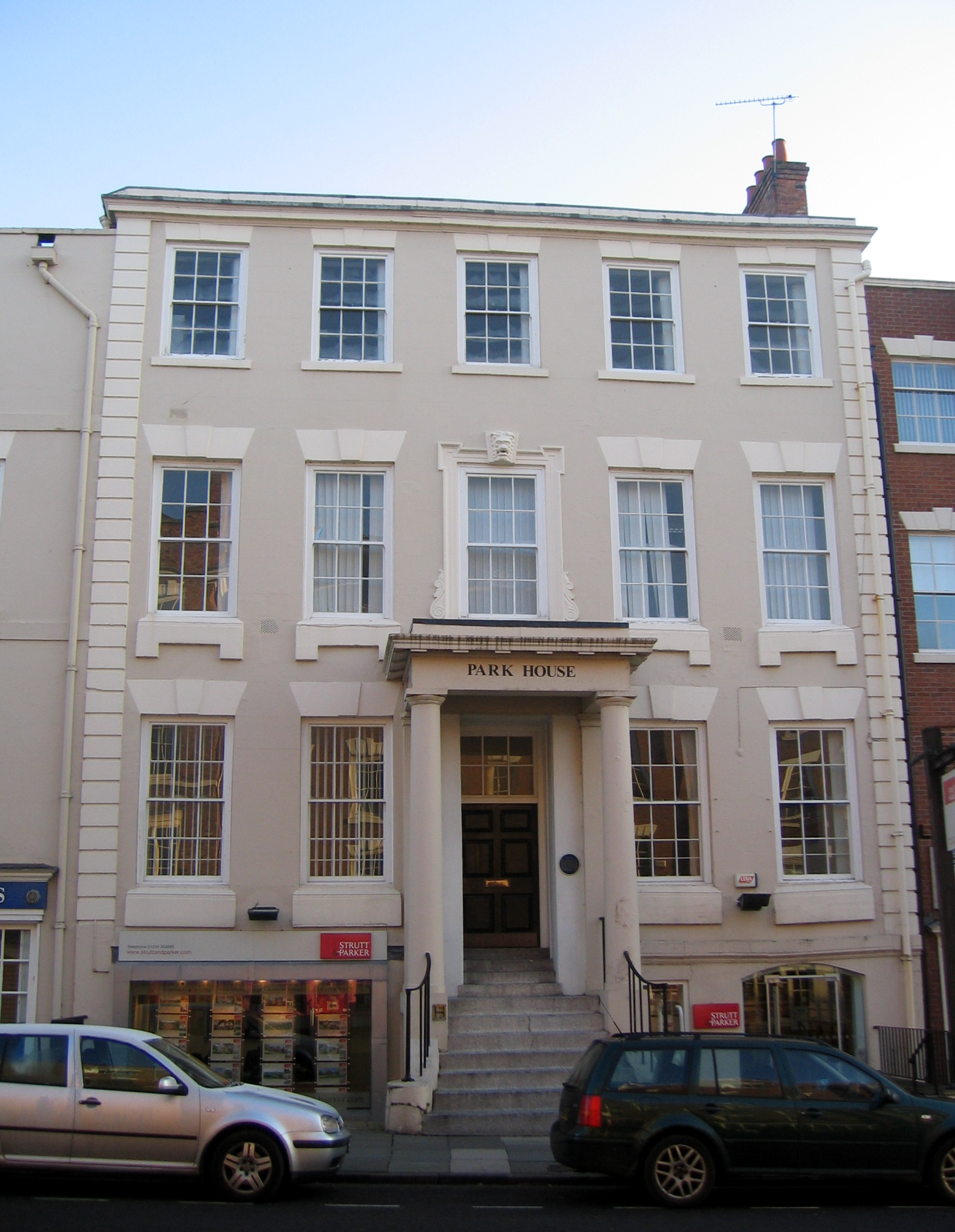
- Park House, Chester

- Location in Cheshire
- 53.1877°N 2.8902°W
- Location: 37–41 Lower Bridge Street, Chester, Cheshire, England
- OS grid reference: SJ 406 660

History
- Built: c. 1717
- Built for: Elizabeth Booth

Site notes
- Architectural style: Georgian

Listed Building – Grade II
- Designated: 28 July 1955
- Reference no.: 1376304

Park House is at 37–41 Lower Bridge Street, Chester, Cheshire, England. It is recorded in the National Heritage List for England as a designated Grade II listed building.

== History ==
Park House was built in about 1717 as a town house for Elizabeth Booth. It was extended in the late 18th century, and in 1818 was converted into a hotel named the Albion Hotel. At this time the 2 acres (0.81 ha) of parkland behind the house were converted into Chester's first public pleasure gardens. The gardens closed in 1865 when the Grosvenor Park was being developed, and working-class terraced houses were built on the site. At some time the name of the hotel was changed to the Talbot Hotel. The house later became used as a library, and later as a licensed premises and shop. Alterations were carried out in the 20th century.

== Architecture ==
The building is constructed in brick that is rendered on the front. It has stone dressings and a grey slate roof. The architectural style is Georgian. The building is in three storeys with a semi-basement; it is symmetrical with five bays. The central bay contains a projecting porch with Tuscan columns. Seven steps lead up to the main entrance. Four steps go down to the north semi-basement, and two to the south semi-basement. At the sides of the building are rusticated quoins. Each bay on all storeys contains a sash window. The interior includes a ballroom.

== See also ==
- Grade II listed buildings in Chester (central)
