= St Andrew's Church, Chester =

Coordinates: 53.1891°N 2.8894°W

- The former church in September 2026

- Location in Cheshire
- OS grid reference: SJ 407 662
- Location: Newgate Street, Chester, Cheshire
- Country: England
- Denomination: United Reformed Church

History
- Dedication: Saint Andrew

Architecture
- Functional status: Redundant church
- Heritage designation: Grade II
- Designated: 6 August 1998
- Architects: J. and J. M. Hay; James Harrison; Kelly and Edwards
- Architectural type: Church
- Style: Gothic Revival
- Groundbreaking: 1857
- Completed: 1884

Specifications
- Materials: Sandstone and brick Slate roofs

St Andrew's Church is a redundant church located in Newgate Street, Chester, Cheshire, England. It is recorded in the National Heritage List for England as a designated Grade II listed building.

== History ==
St Andrew's was built as a Presbyterian church between 1857 and 1860, was later used as a United Reformed Church. It has since been closed. The architects were J. and J. M. Hay, with James Harrison. In 1866 an entrance front was added, paid for by Robert Barbour of Manchester and Bolesworth. The body of the church was rebuilt in 1884 by Kelly and Edwards.

== Architecture ==
The church is constructed in yellow sandstone and brick. It is partly rendered, and has slate roofs. Its orientation is reversed from the usual. Its plan includes aisles with clerestories. The entrance front includes an arched doorway with a lancet window to the left; in the storey above are two two-light windows and a gable. To the left of the gable is an octagonal bellcote with a stone spire, and to the right is a crocketed pinnacle. There is a rose window at the liturgical east end. The body of the church is in five bays, each bay of the clerestory containing triple lancets.

== See also ==
- Grade II listed buildings in Chester (central)
