= 38 Bridge Street, Chester =

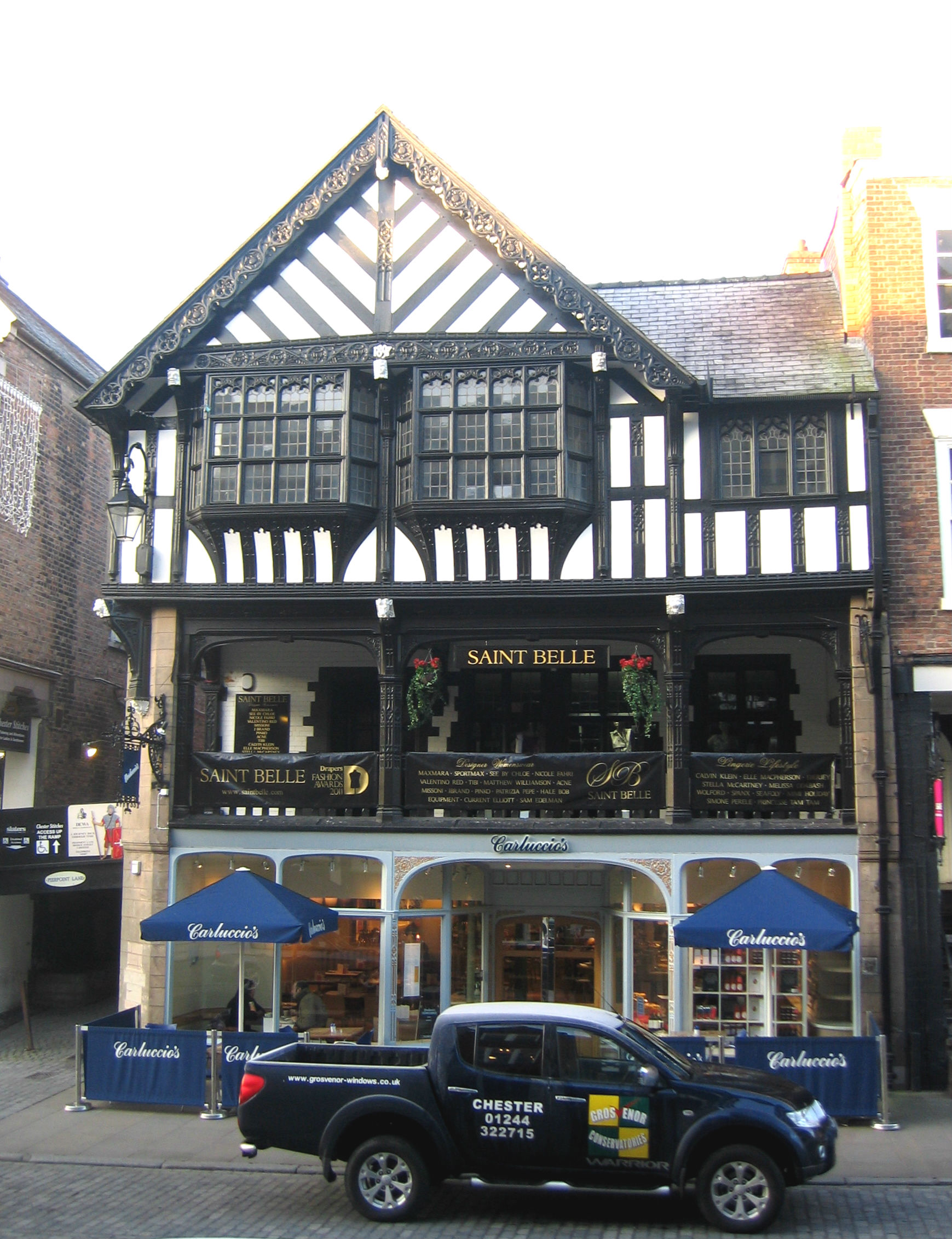
- 38 Bridge Street

- Location in Cheshire
- 53°11′21″N 2°53′29″W
- Location: Chester, Cheshire, England
- OS grid reference: SJ 405 662

History
- Built: 1897

Site notes
- Architect: Douglas & Fordham
- Architectural style: Black-and-white Revival

Listed Building – Grade II
- Official name: No.38 Street and Nos.36 & 38 Row
- Designated: 10 January 1972
- Reference no.: 1376082

38 Bridge Street is a commercial property in Chester, Cheshire, England. It is recorded in the National Heritage List for England as a designated Grade listed building. The building was constructed in 1897 and was designed by the local architects Douglas and Fordham. It is the only new building designed by Douglas to incorporate a section of the Chester Rows.

The building is in three storeys and is constructed in yellow sandstone and brick with stone dressings. The top storey is timber-framed. A modern shop front has been inserted into the lowest storey. The middle storey, which incorporates a section of the Rows, has a timber balustrade, behind which is the walkway, and then another shop front. The top storey is jettied. On the face overlooking Bridge Street are two six-light oriel windows under a gable, and a smaller three-light casement window to the right. On the south side, overlooking Pierpoint Lane, are small windows in both the middle and the upper storeys. Douglas' biographer Edward Hubbard considers it is one of his "most heavily decorated half-timber works".

As of 2012 row level of the building is occupied by designer womenswear brand The Editeur, and the street level by Italian restaurant chain Carluccio's.

== See also ==
- Grade II listed buildings in Chester (central)
- List of non-ecclesiastical and non-residential works by John Douglas
