= Old Custom House Inn, Chester =

Old Custom House Inn
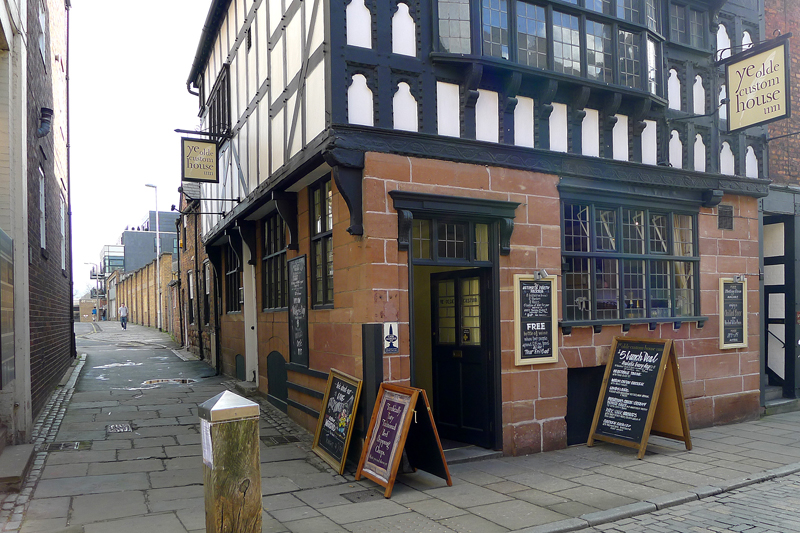
- Old Custom House Inn

- Location in Cheshire
- 53.1897°N 2.8945°W
- Location: 69 and 71 Watergate Street, Chester, Cheshire, England
- OS grid reference: SJ 403 662

Listed Building – Grade II
- Designated: 28 July 1955
- Reference no.: 1376449

The Old Custom House Inn is located at 69 and 71 Watergate Street, Chester, Cheshire, England. It is recorded in the National Heritage List for England as a designated Grade II listed building.

== History ==
The inn originated from two former houses, their undercrofts now forming the inn's cellars. The older house, on the east side, is dated 1637, and the west house dates probably from the early 18th century. Part of Chester Rows formerly passed through the buildings, but this was enclosed in 1711. The inn also incorporates a former cottage to its rear built on a burgage plot. When it opened as an inn it was called The Star Inn, but later changed its name in the late 18th century because the custom house of the port of Chester stood opposite. The building has been altered on a number of occasions, most recently in the 1990s when an extension was added to the rear of the former west house.

== Architecture ==
The former east house is constructed with sandstone in the lower storey, and timber framing above. It has an undercroft, and two storeys plus an attic. On the side facing Watergate Street is a gable, an entrance door, a beer-drop door, and a five-light transomed window in the lower storey. Between the storeys is a bressumer carved with vine leaves, grapes, and the initials "T.W.A.". The upper storey contains a seven-light transomed oriel window, with a small two-light window on each side. Around these windows are panels, some of which are plain, the others arched. The gable is jettied and carries the date 1637. It contains a three-light mullioned casement window with herringbone struts at the sides and above it. The bargeboards are plain. The former west house has a rendered lower storey, and a brick upper storey. It has a doorway and two three-light windows in the lower storey, and sash windows above. The former cottage at the rear is in Georgian style. It is constructed in brick on a sandstone plinth, with a grey slate roof. It contains sash windows, and two dormers in the gables above. Many alterations have been carried out to the interior of the inn, but it does retain oak beams dating from about 1642, and a carved stone fireplace.

== See also ==
- Grade II listed buildings in Chester (central)
