= 10–28 Nicholas Street, Chester =

Terrace of houses on the west side of the street in Chester, Cheshire, England

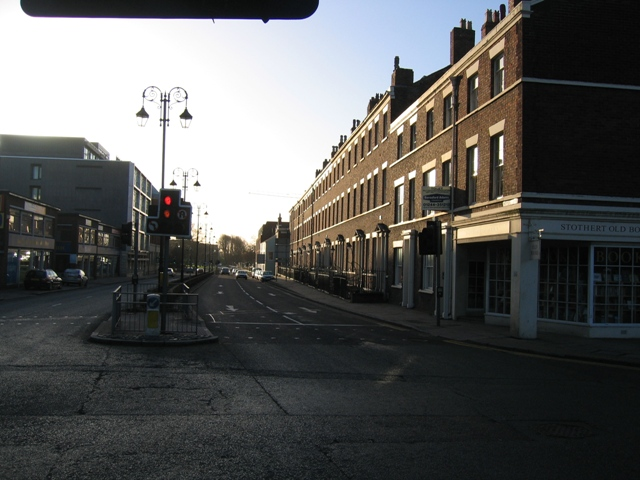
- Nicholas Street, Chester

- Location in Cheshire
- 53.1891°N 2.8951°W
- Location: Chester, Cheshire, England
- OS grid reference: SJ 403 661

History
- Built: 1780

Site notes
- Architect: Joseph Turner
- Architectural style: Georgian

Listed Building – Grade II
- Designated: 28 July 1955
- Reference no.: 1376327

10–28 Nicholas Street is a terrace of houses on the west side of the street in Chester, Cheshire, England. It is recorded in the National Heritage List for England as a designated Grade II listed building.

== History ==
The terrace was built in 1780. It was designed by Joseph Turner, and originally consisted of ten town houses. The terrace became known as "Pillbox Promenade", or "Pillbox Row", because many of the houses were used as doctors' surgeries. It is the "longest and most uniform of any of the Georgian properties in Chester".

== Architecture ==
The houses are constructed in brown brick in Flemish bond, with stone dressings and grey slate roofs. They are in three storeys plus a basement, and contain sash windows.

== See also ==
- Grade II listed buildings in Chester (central)
