= Chester Carmelite Friary =

Friary in Chester, England

Coordinates: 53°11′19.75″N 2°53′35.61″W

Chester Carmelite Friary, otherwise Chester Whitefriars, was a friary in the city of Chester in Cheshire, England. The Carmelites were present in Chester from the late 1270s and by the mid-14th century were established as a well-regarded community. Their church and graveyard were popular for burials of the well-to-do and the friary was often mentioned in Chester wills. Their church steeple when rebuilt in 1495 became a useful landmark for ships. The friary was dissolved in 1538. There are no surviving buildings but the street name Whitefriars preserves the memory of the community.
