= Dutch Houses, Chester =

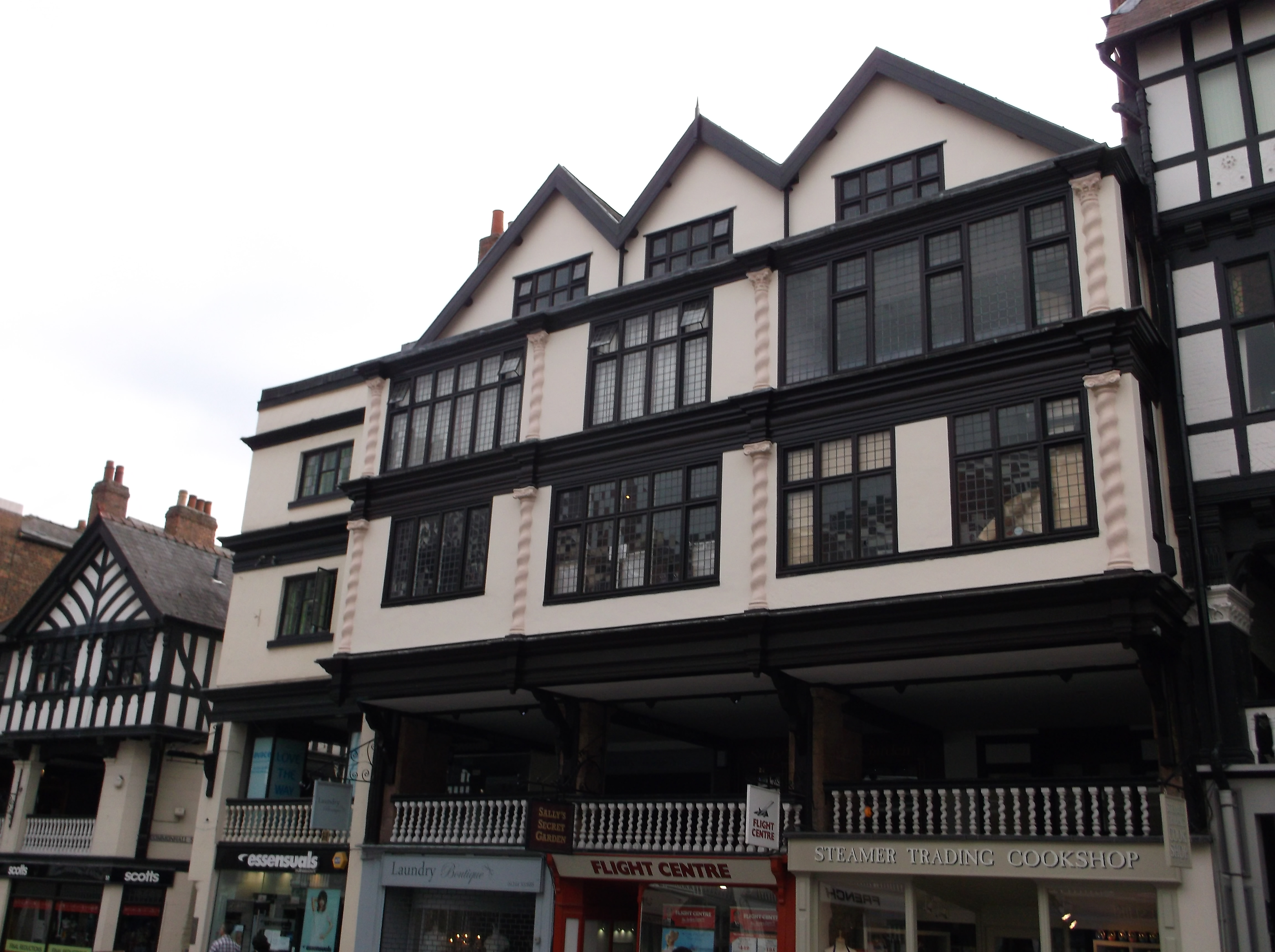
- The Dutch Houses

- Location in Cheshire
- 53.1897°N 2.8916°W
- Location: 20, 22 and 24 Bridge Street Row, Chester, Cheshire, England
- OS grid reference: SJ 405 662

History
- Built: c. 1670
- Rebuilt: 1973–75

Site notes
- Restored by: Chester City Council

Listed Building – Grade II
- Designated: 28 July 1955
- Reference no.: 1376071

The Dutch Houses are at 20, 22 and 24 Bridge Street Row, Chester, Cheshire, England. They are recorded in the National Heritage List for England as a designated Grade II listed building.

== History ==
The building was erected in about 1670, possibly above earlier undercrofts. The name reflects the trade undertaken with the Low Countries around that time. At the time it was built, it was the tallest and most impressive building in Bridge Street, and remained so for over 200 years. By the 1970s the building was in a state of decay, and it was restored and rebuilt in 1973–75 by Chester City Council. The rebuilding involved removing the whole of the façade and rebuilding it, and replacing the internal timberwork with steel. In the process many of the internal features were lost.

== Architecture ==
The Dutch Houses are constructed on sandstone piers, probably originating from the medieval period, with timber framing from the late 17th century, and rendered brickwork from the late 17th or the 18th century. It consists of three bays in four storeys plus an attic. The bottom storey incorporates the undercrofts, and a portion of the Chester Rows passes through the first floor. The lowest storey, at street level, includes modern shop fronts. At the level of the Row are painted wood barley sugar balusters with rails. Behind these are stallboards, the paved walkway of the Row, and more modern shopfronts. The third and fourth storeys are jettied, both containing barley sugar pilasters and casement windows of varying sizes. The attic storey is set back, each bay containing a three-light mullioned and transomed window.

== See also ==
- Grade II listed buildings in Chester (central)
