= Egerton Street School, Chester =

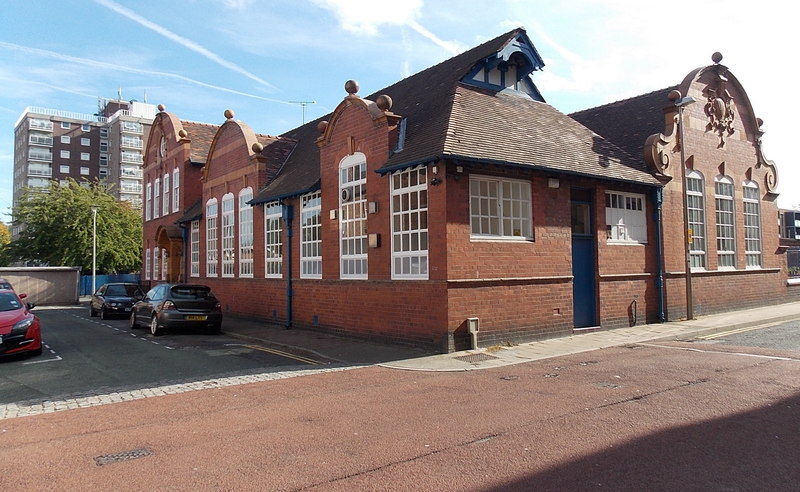

- Location in Cheshire
- 53.1951°N 2.8840°W
- Location: Chester, Cheshire, England
- OS grid reference: SJ 410 668

History
- Built: 1909–10
- Built for: Chester City Council

Site notes
- Architect(s): John Douglas; W. T. Lockwood

Listed Building – Grade II
- Designated: 14 October 1991
- Reference no.: 1375790

Egerton Street School is in Chester, Cheshire, England, and has fronts on Egerton Street, Albert Street and Crewe Street. It is recorded in the National Heritage List for England as a designated Grade listed building.

Today the building is used a private nursery school.

== History ==
The school was designed jointly by John Douglas and W. T. Lockwood (son of Thomas Lockwood) for Chester City Council and built in 1909–10. Douglas' biographer Edward Hubbard comments that "the joint authorship is clearly obvious".

== Architecture ==
The school is constructed in red brick with yellow terracotta dressings and it has a brown tile roof. It is in one or two storeys and has three shaped gables.

== See also ==
- Grade II listed buildings in Chester (north and west)
- List of non-ecclesiastical and non-residential works by John Douglas
