= List of non-ecclesiastical and non-residential works by John Douglas =

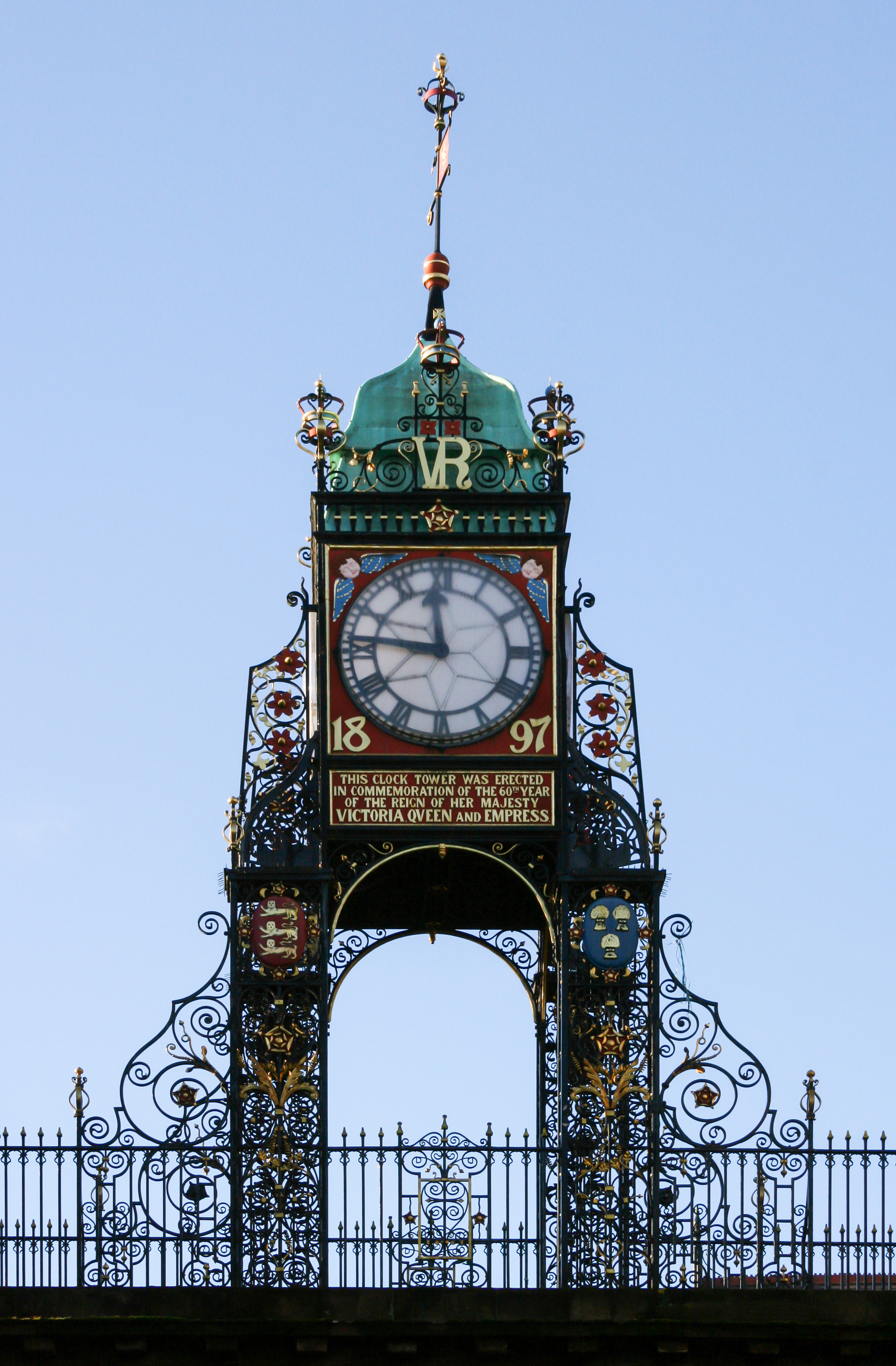
Eastgate Clock designed by Douglas and erected on Chester's Eastgate in 1899 to commemorate Queen Victoria's Diamond Jubilee

John Douglas (1830–1911) was an English architect based in Chester, Cheshire. His designs included new churches, alterations to and restoration of existing churches, church furnishings, new houses and alterations to existing houses. He also designed a variety of other buildings, including shops, banks, offices, schools, memorials and public buildings. His architectural styles were eclectic, but as he worked during the period of the Gothic Revival, much of his work incorporates elements of the English Gothic style. Douglas is probably best remembered for his incorporation of vernacular elements in his buildings, especially half-timbering. Of particular importance is Douglas' use of joinery and highly detailed wood carving.

Douglas was born in the Cheshire village of Sandiway and was articled to the Lancaster architect E. G. Paley, later becoming his chief assistant. He established an office in Chester in either 1855 or 1860, from where he practised throughout his career. Initially he ran the office himself but in 1884 he appointed a former assistant, Daniel Porter Fordham, as a partner. When Fordham retired in 1897, he was succeeded by Charles Howard Minshull. In 1909 this partnership was dissolved and Douglas ran the office alone until his death in 1911. As his office was in Chester, most of his work was carried out in Cheshire and North Wales, although some was further afield in regions including Merseyside, Greater Manchester, and Shropshire.

From an early stage in his career, Douglas attracted commissions from wealthy and powerful patrons, the first of which came from Hugh Cholmondeley, 2nd Baron Delamere. His most important patrons were the Grosvenor family of Eaton Hall, namely Richard Grosvenor, 2nd Marquess of Westminster, Hugh Grosvenor, 1st Duke of Westminster, and Hugh Grosvenor, 2nd Duke of Westminster. Douglas designed a large number and variety of buildings in the family's Eaton Hall estate and the surrounding villages. Other important patrons were William Molyneux, 4th Earl of Sefton, Rowland Egerton-Warburton of Arley Hall, George Cholmondeley, 5th Marquess of Cholmondeley, and Francis Egerton, 3rd Earl of Ellesmere. Later in his career Douglas carried out commissions for W. E. Gladstone and his family, and for W. H. Lever.

This list consists of the major, or more unusual, works carried out by Douglas, excluding his work on or related to churches or houses. (Note: In this context, "major" usually means that the structure is listed; the term "unusual" allows the inclusion in the list of such objects as a garden ornament (because it was Douglas' first known commission), a temporary triumphal arch, and substantial buildings that have been demolished.) It contains a great variety of buildings, including schools, shops, offices, hotels, public houses, banks, model farms, cheese factories and a gentlemen's club. More utilitarian buildings include public baths and a public convenience. Other commissions undertaken by Douglas included in the list include a commemorative clock, memorials, a bridge, park gates and walls, a canopy over a well, a temporary triumphal arch, and an obelisk in the drive of a stately home. Many of these have been recognised as listed buildings. Listed buildings are divided into three grades according to their importance (see key). The details have been taken from the Catalogue of Works in Edward Hubbard's biography. Works attributed to Douglas by Hubbard on stylistic grounds together with evidence of a local association, even though they are not confirmed by other reliable evidence, are included. Where this is the case, it is stated in the Notes column. Unexecuted schemes are not included.

== Key ==
Grade	Criteria
Grade I	Buildings of exceptional interest, sometimes considered to be internationally important.
Grade II*	Particularly important buildings of more than special interest.
Grade II	Buildings of national importance and special interest.
"—" denotes a work that is not graded.

== Buildings and structures ==
Name	Location	Date	Notes	Grade
Garden ornament	Abbots Moss, Oakmere, Cheshire; 53.2094°N 2.6126°W	1856	This was Douglas' earliest recorded independent work, designed for a Mrs. Cholmondeley. It consisted of an octagonal structure with a sundial on one side and a griffin motif on the other. It is no longer in existence.	—
Boteler Grammar School	School Brow, Warrington, Cheshire; 53.3918°N 2.6126°W	1862–64	The school was built of brick with stone dressings, and had a central tower with a pyramidal roof. It became the offices of the Corporation Works Department and has since been demolished.	—
19–21 Sankey Street	Warrington, Cheshire; 53.3889°N 2.5943°W	1864	This is a shop, built for Robert Garnett and Sons. Its front in the ground floor has been replaced but the upper storeys remain. Hubbard considers this to be one of Douglas' best buildings.	II
Billy Hobby's Well	Grosvenor Park, Chester, Cheshire; 53.1897°N 2.8803°W	1865–67	Douglas' work, for the 2nd Marquess of Westminster, consists of a canopy over a pre-existing spring or well.	II
Gates, gatepiers and walls	Grosvenor Park, Chester, Cheshire; 53.1897°N 2.8803°W	1865–67	These structures were built around Grosvenor Park for the 2nd Marquess of Westminster.	II
Triumphal Arch	Chester, Cheshire	1869	The arch was a temporary structure in connection with the visit of the Prince of Wales (later Edward VII); it was then demolished.	—
Witton Grammar School	Northwich, Cheshire; 53.2602°N 2.5061°W	1. 1869; 2. 1874–78	Douglas designed a new building for the school in 1869, and in 1874–78 a master's house with accommodation for boarders. The buildings have since been altered and the school, now named Sir John Deane's College, is on a different site.	—
Warburton School	Warburton, Greater Manchester; 53.3998°N 2.4384°W	1871–72	The school was built for Rowland Egerton-Warburton in brick with stone and terracotta dressings. It has since been converted into a house.	II
Dutch Tea House	Eaton Hall, Cheshire; 53.1374°N 2.8759°W	1872	This was built for the 2nd Earl Grosvenor as a half-timbered building in the Dutch Garden of Eaton Hall. It has a cruciform plan, and steep roofs that rise to a point.	II
St Werburgh Chambers	29–31 St Werburgh Street, Chester, Cheshire; 53.1912°N 2.8907°W	1872–73	The building was designed for his client G. Hodgkinson, and originally consisted of offices; it is now two shops.	II
Colwyn Bay Hotel	Colwyn Bay, Conwy, Wales	c. 1872	The hotel was one of Douglas' largest buildings, but has been demolished.	—
St Werburgh's Mount	15–27 St Werburgh Street, Chester, Cheshire; 53.1913°N 2.8904°W	1873–74	Built as shop premises for his client G. Hodgkinson, the building is still occupied by shops; it is timber-framed with brick nogging and some pargetted plaster panels.	II
Bunbury Aldersey School	Bunbury, Cheshire; 53.1167°N 2.6526°W	1874	Originally a grammar school for boys replacing an earlier school, it is now a primary school. It is built in brick with slate roofs and incorporates a slate-clad turret.	II
Balderton Cheese Factory	Balderton, Cheshire; 53.1540°N 2.9397°W	1874–75	The factory was built for the 1st Duke of Westminster. It has a brick lower storey and a half-timbered attic storey with plaster panels and gables.	II
Aldford Cheese Factory	Aldford, Cheshire	1874–75	This was built for the 1st Duke of Westminster. It has not been possible to determine the location of this factory, or if it is still in existence.	—
Eccleston School	Eccleston, Cheshire; 53.1575°N 2.8821°W	1874–81	The school was built for the 1st Duke of Westminster in one of his estate villages. It has a T-shaped plan, is constructed in sandstone with a tiled roof in Tudor style, and has an octagonal steepled belfry turret.	II*
George and Dragon	Great Budworth, Cheshire; 53.2937°N 2.5051°W	1875	The public house was remodelled for Rowland Egerton-Warburton from a former inn. It has ribbed chimneys, brick mullions and a steep pyramidal turret.	II
Little Nag's Head Cocoa House	Foregate Street, Chester, Cheshire	1877	This former inn was remodelled for the 1st Duke of Westminster and promoted by him as a working men's coffee tavern. Above the ground floor it was entirely half-timbered, with some brick nogging; it has been demolished.	—
Sessions House and Police Station	Northop, Flintshire, Wales; 53.2077°N 3.1299°W	1877	This was built for John Scott Bankes as a brick and half-timbered newsroom, sessions house and police station. The sessions and house and police station have since been used for other purposes, and are separately listed at Grade II.	II
Cottage Hospital	Gwernaffield Road, Mold, Flintshire, Wales	1877–78	Douglas designed this cottage hospital. The hospital has been superseded by Mold Community Hospital on a different site. It has not been possible to determine its present use, or if it is still in existence.	—
Waverton School	Waverton, Cheshire; 53.1649°N 2.8069°W	1877–78	This was built for the 1st Duke of Westminster as a school with an attached house for the schoolmaster. The house is constructed in brick with a timber-framed upper storey, and the school is in sandstone with three gables; it is now used as a parish hall.	II
Wrexham Road Farm	Eccleston, Cheshire; 53.1614°N 2.9026°W	1877–84	As a model farm built for the 1st Duke of Westminster, it was Douglas' first complete farmstead. The farmhouse and the farm buildings form a quadrangle. They have been converted into offices as part of Chester Business Park.	II
Stud Lodge	Eaton Hall, Cheshire; 53.1476°N 2.8758°W	1881–82	This was built as a store shed and domestic offices for the 1st Duke of Westminster. It includes a spire and its end is polygonal and apse-like.	II
Grosvenor Club and North and South Wales Bank	47–57 Eastgate Street, Chester, Cheshire; 53.1909°N 2.8889°W	1. 1881–83; 2. 1908	Built as a combined gentlemen's club and bank, it is constructed in brick and stone and has two turrets. On its front are the date 1881, the Grosvenor arms, and a frieze with the arms of the twelve former shires of Wales. Additions to the building were made in 1908 and it is now in use as an HSBC bank.	II
Churton Memorial Fountain	Whitchurch, Shropshire; 52.969507°N 2.678776°W	1882	This was built for John Churton and consists of a drinking fountain with a granite base and sandstone upper parts. It originally stood at a road junction, but because it was interfering with traffic flow, it was moved to its present site in the 1930s.	II
Peers Memorial	St Peter's Square, Ruthin, Denbighshire, Wales; 53.114616°N 3.310578°W	1883	The memorial was built to commemorate Joseph Peers JP during his lifetime. It incorporates a clock tower, a horse trough and a drinking fountain, and includes Jacobean motifs.	II
142 Foregate Street	Chester, Cheshire; 53.1919°N 2.8820°W	1884	This was built as the headquarters of the Cheshire County Constabulary. It is constructed in brick with terracotta and stone dressings and has a Flemish-style gable.	II
Castle Hotel	High Street, Conwy, Wales; 53.2812°N 3.8292°W	1885	Douglas remodelled a pre-existing public house and hotel and added another section, making it into a single building that is now the Castle Hotel. Small, broken pieces of limestone were used as a facing material, giving it a flint-like appearance.	II
Saighton Lane Farm	Saighton, Cheshire; 53.1615°N 2.8280°W	1888–89	The farmhouse and farm buildings were built as a model farm for the 1st Duke of Westminster. The farmhouse contains diapered brickwork, half-timbering, gabled roofs, and twisted brick chimneys.	II
Church House	Warburton, Greater Manchester; 53.3987°N 2.4454°W	1889	This was built as parish rooms and a caretaker's house for Rowland Egerton-Warburton and continues in use as parish rooms. It is built in brick with sandstone dressings and has decorative lozenge shapes in brick and painted plaster.	II
117 Foregate Street	Chester, Cheshire; 53.1918°N 2.8838°W	1889–90	This was built as a shop with living quarters above in red brick with blue brick diapering and stone dressings for the 1st Duke of Westminster. It has shaped gables and twisted brick chimneys.	II
Ruthin Grammar School	Ruthin, Denbighshire, Wales; 53.1171°N 3.2997°W	1889–92	The front of the school is built in limestone with sandstone dressings. Its entrance is in an off-centre tower and it has a range of gables on each side.	II
School	Stockton-on-Teme, Worcestershire	1890	This was built for William Jones and has been attributed to Douglas.	—
Obelisk	Eaton Hall, Cheshire; 53.140917°N 2.884807°W	1890–91	The obelisk is constructed in red sandstone with a copper cap. It was built for the 1st Duke of Westminster and stands in one of the driveways leading to Eaton Hall.	II
Dell Bridge	Port Sunlight, Merseyside; 53.350238°N 2.996237°W	1894	The bridge was built for the Lever Brothers; it is a sandstone footbridge over a dell in the model village of Port Sunlight.	II
Church room and vicarage	Colwyn Bay, Conwy, Wales	1894–95	These were built adjacent to St Paul's Church, that was also designed by Douglas.	—
Lyceum	Port Sunlight, Merseyside; 53.3505°N 2.9963°W	1894–96	This was built as a school for the Lever Brothers; it is in red brick with blue brick diapering and stone dressings, and has shaped gables and a tower. It is now used as a social centre and architects' offices.	II
2–18 St Werburgh Street	Chester, Cheshire; 53.1910°N 2.8898°W	c. 1895–97	It consists of a range of shops and a bank developed by Douglas on land he owned. The ground floor is in sandstone and the upper stories are in highly ornamented timber framing.	II*
38 Bridge Street	Chester, Cheshire; 53.1893°N 2.8914°W	1897	This is the only new building in the city by Douglas incorporating the rows; it is one of his most heavily decorated half-timbered works.	II
St Oswald's Chambers	20–22 St Werburgh St, Chester, Cheshire; 53.1914°N 2.8900°W	1898	Douglas designed this commercial property to improve the view towards Chester Cathedral. It consists of a two-storey office block in brick and half-timber with a turret.	II
Public baths	Union Street, Chester, Cheshire; 53.1907°N 2.8829°W	1898–1901	One of Douglas' few utilitarian buildings, it was constructed for Chester City Council and involved specialist engineering work; it is still in use as swimming baths.	II
Eastgate Clock	Chester, Cheshire; 53.190847°N 2.888806°W	1899	The clock was erected on the pre-existing Eastgate for Chester City Council to commemorate Queen Victoria's Diamond Jubilee. It is said to be the most photographed clock in England after Big Ben.	I
St Deiniol's Library	Hawarden, Flintshire, Wales; 53.1859°N 3.0272°W	1. 1899–1902; 2. 1904–06	W. E. Gladstone set up a trust for this building as a place for study and learning. Construction did not start until after his death, starting with the library, and residential accommodation was added a few years later.	I
Friars School	Bangor, Gwynedd, Wales; 53.2234°N 4.1437°W	1900	Douglas won a competition to design this school for Caernarvonshire Education Committee. Its front is in two storeys, with a central three-storey tower.	II
5–9 Northgate Street	Chester, Cheshire; 53.1908°N 2.8916°W	1900	Douglas owned the land on which this part of a range of shops was built. In the upper storey are three pairs of canted five-light oriel windows, and between each pair of windows is a carved figure.	II*
11–13 Northgate Street	Chester, Cheshire; 53.1909°N 2.8916°W	1900	This part of the range of shops is built on medieval undercrofts. The upper storey contains two seven-light bowed oriel windows, each with further windows on each side, forming a row of continuous glazing.	II
30 Bridge Street	Chester, Cheshire53.1895°N 2.8915°W	1900	This was formerly a public house named Harp and Crown. Douglas rebuilt it and the name was changed to Grotto; it is now a shop.	II
19 Northgate Street	Chester, Cheshire; 53.1910°N 2.8916°W	c. 1900	Part of a range of shops, its rebuilding is attributed to Douglas; it retains some medieval masonry.	II
Bank Buildings	1–7 Charing Cross, Birkenhead, Merseyside; 53.3892°N 3.0308°W	1901	Built on a corner site, this consisted of a bank with shops on both sides. The bank is flanked by two turrets, and to its right is a stair tower; all these have conical roofs. The part of the building formerly housing the bank is now used as a shop and offices.	II
27–31 Northgate Street	Chester, Cheshire; 53.1912°N 2.8918°W	1902	This is the most complex and detailed building in the range of shops, standing at its north end. The upper storey is timber framed and at its corner is a painted effigy of Edward VII.	II*
Rayner Memorial Clock Tower	Llangefni, Anglesey, Wales; 53.255772°N 4.310752°W	1902	The clock tower stands in front of the town hall and was built in memory of George Pritchard Rayner who died in South Africa.	II
122 Foregate Street	Chester, Cheshire; 53.1917°N 2.8830°W	1903	Standing on a corner and attached to the terrace of houses built by Douglas in Bath Street, this was built for Prudential Assurance and has since had a variety of uses. It is constructed in sandstone and has two Baroque-shaped gables.	II
25 Northgate Street	Chester, Cheshire; 53.1911°N 2.8917°W	1903	Formerly the Woolpack Inn, it was rebuilt by Douglas incorporating the previously existing medieval undercroft that possibly contains Roman stonework.	II*
Bear's Paw	Frodsham, Cheshire; 53.2961°N 2.7260°W	1903–04	Formerly a hotel and coaching inn, Douglas restored its front and side. It is now a public house.	II
78–94 Foregate Street	Chester, Cheshire; 53.1914°N 2.8846°W	1904	Built as a department store for the Chester Cooperative Society, it is Douglas' only building in Baroque style. It has since extended to form a range of separate shops.	II
Public conveniences and lodge	Frodsham Street, Chester, Cheshire; 53.1919°N 2.8885°W	1904	This was built as public conveniences and a shop for Chester City Council. It has a sandstone ground storey and a timber-framed upper storey.	II
Egerton Street School	Chester, Cheshire; 53.1951°N 2.8840°W	1909–10	The school was designed in collaboration with W. T. Lockwood for Chester City Council. It is built in brick with terracotta dressings and has shaped gables.	II

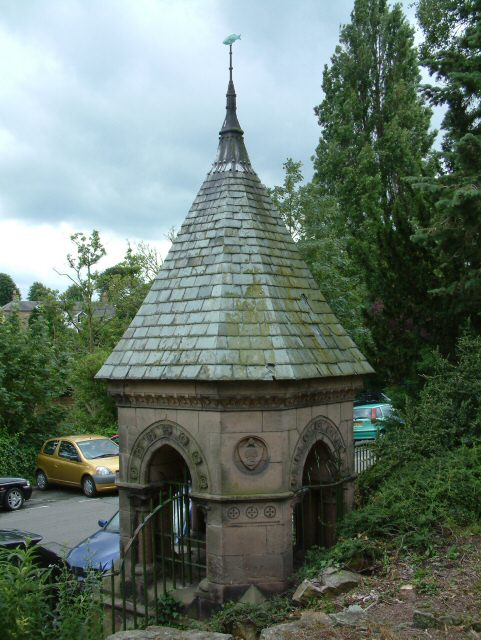
Billy Hobby's Well

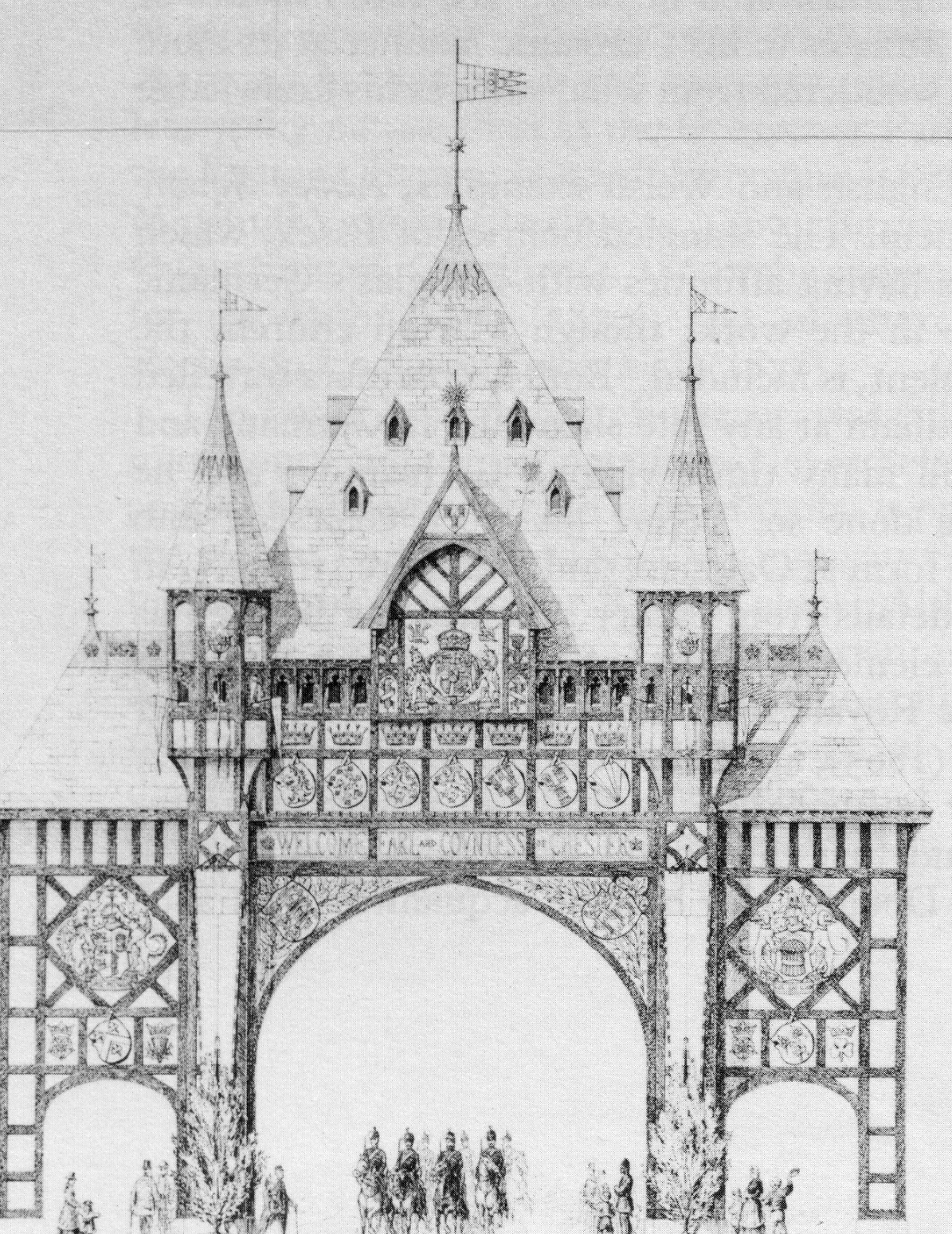
Drawing dated 1869 of the Triumphal Arch, Chester

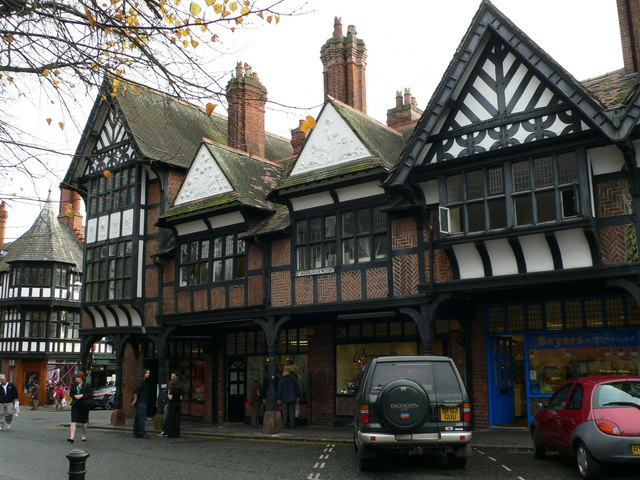
St Werburgh's Mount, Chester

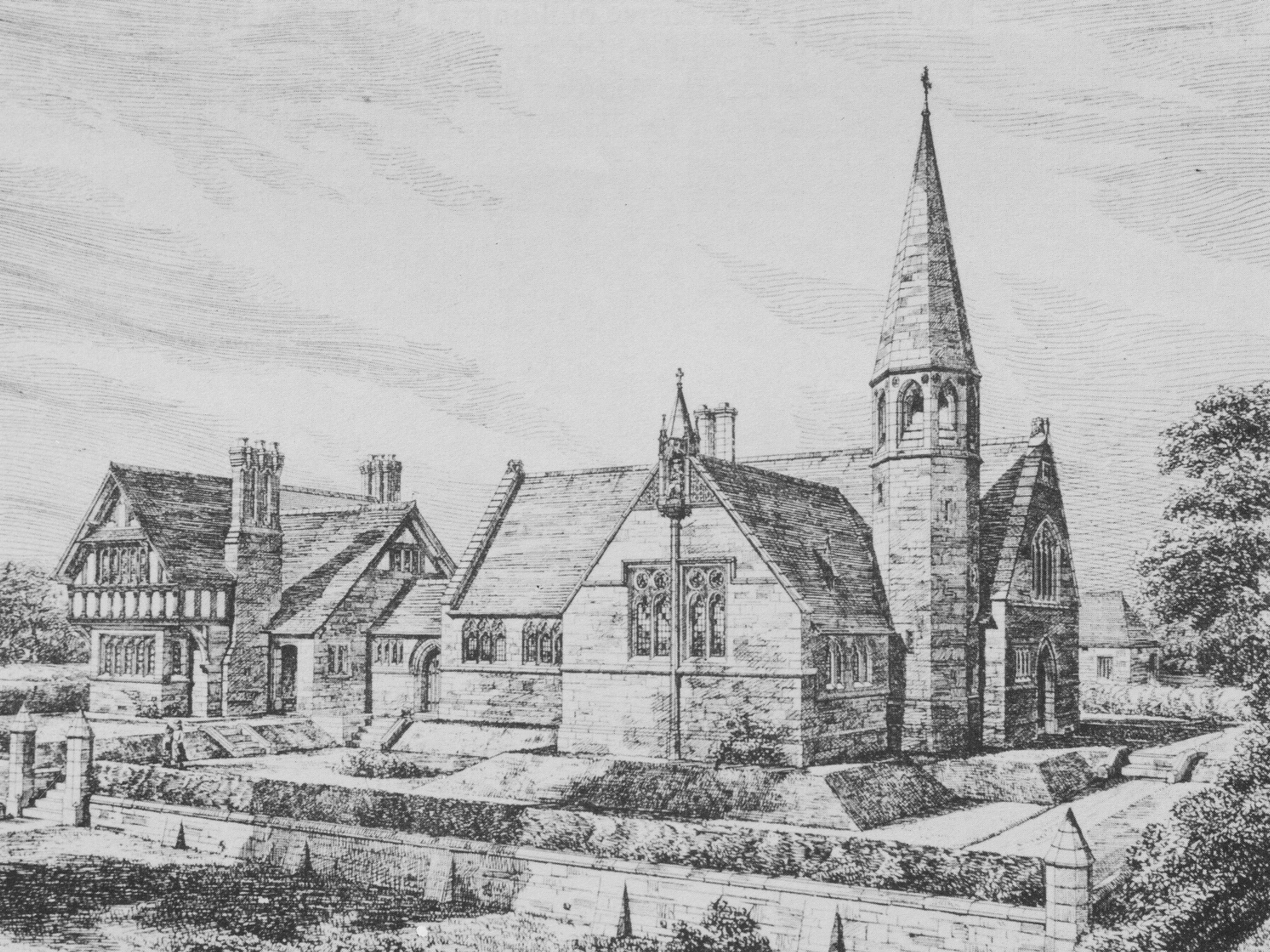
Eccleston School, drawn by Fordham, Douglas' partner, in 1879

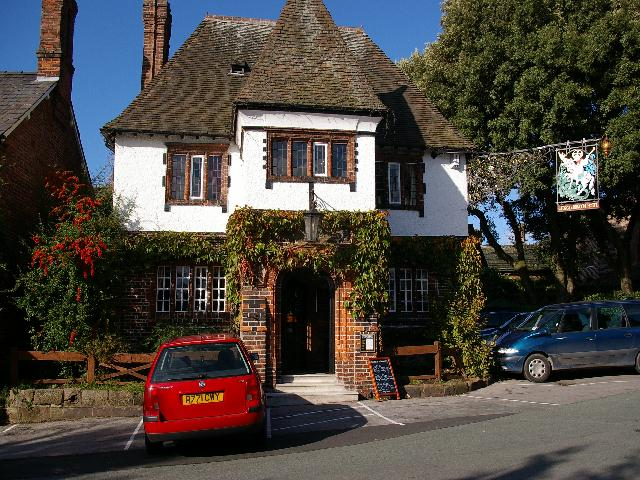
George and Dragon, Great Budworth

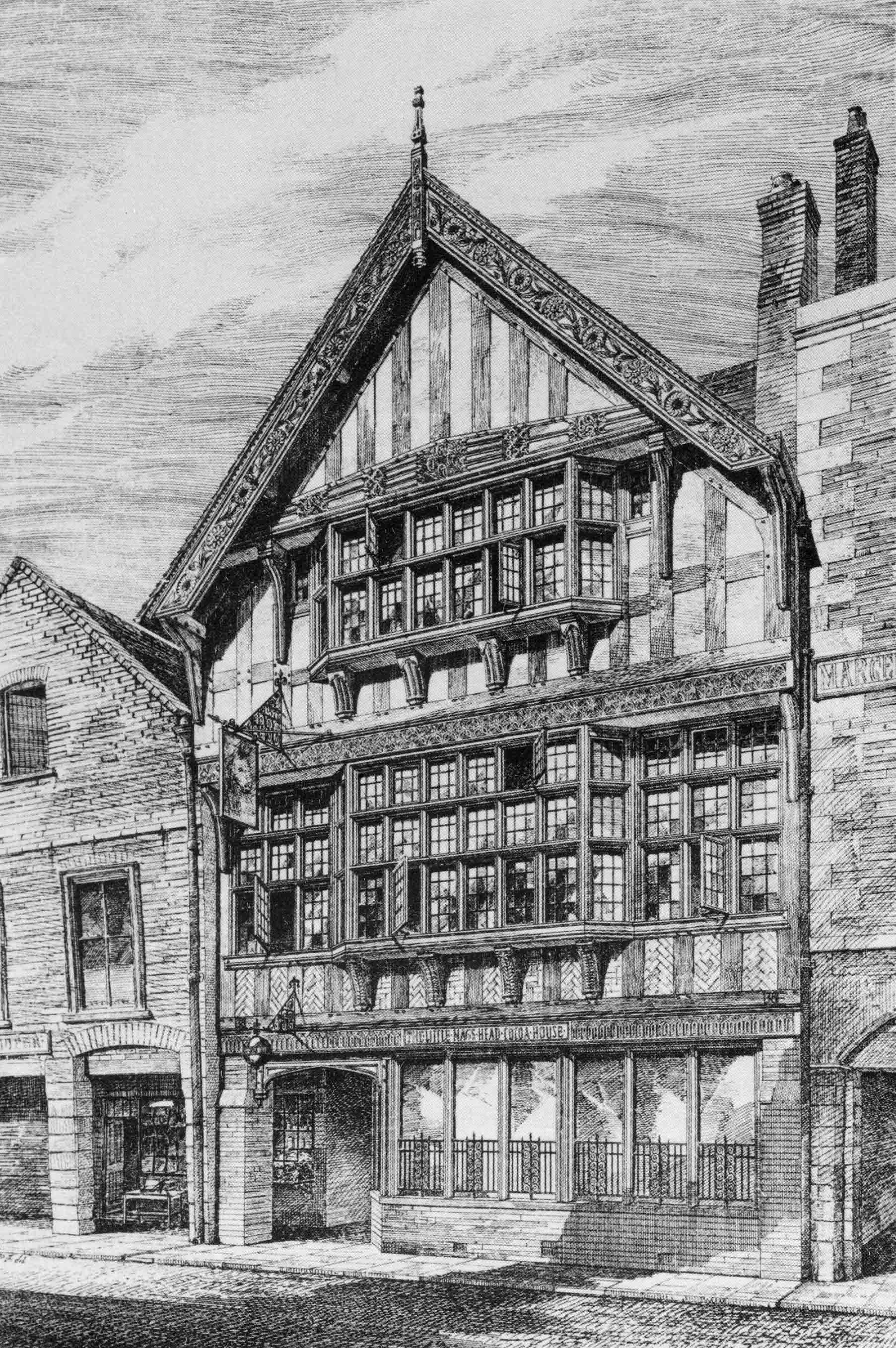
Drawing of Little Nag's Head Cocoa House in 1877

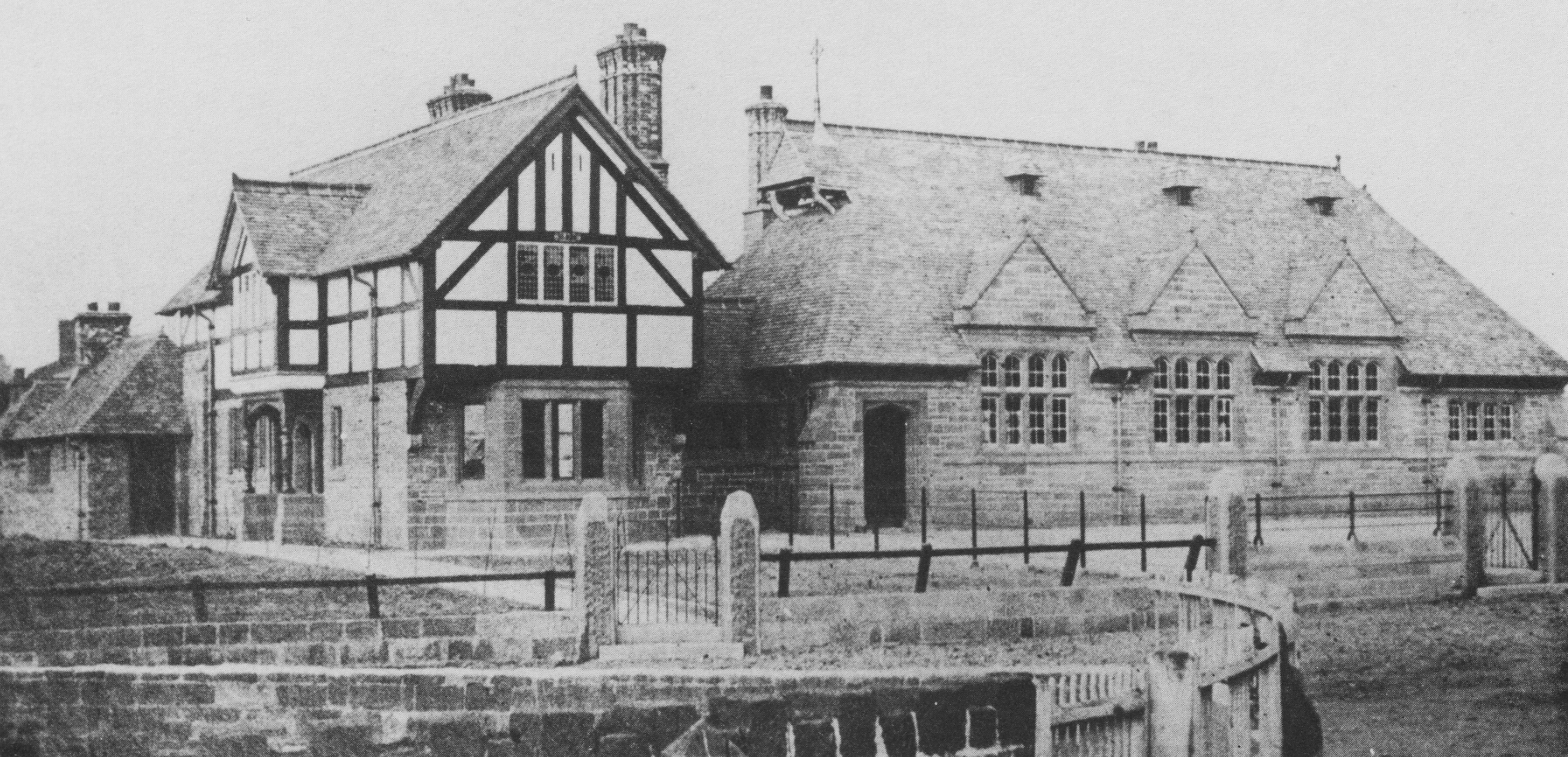
Photograph of Waverton school and the schoolmaster's house taken about 1880

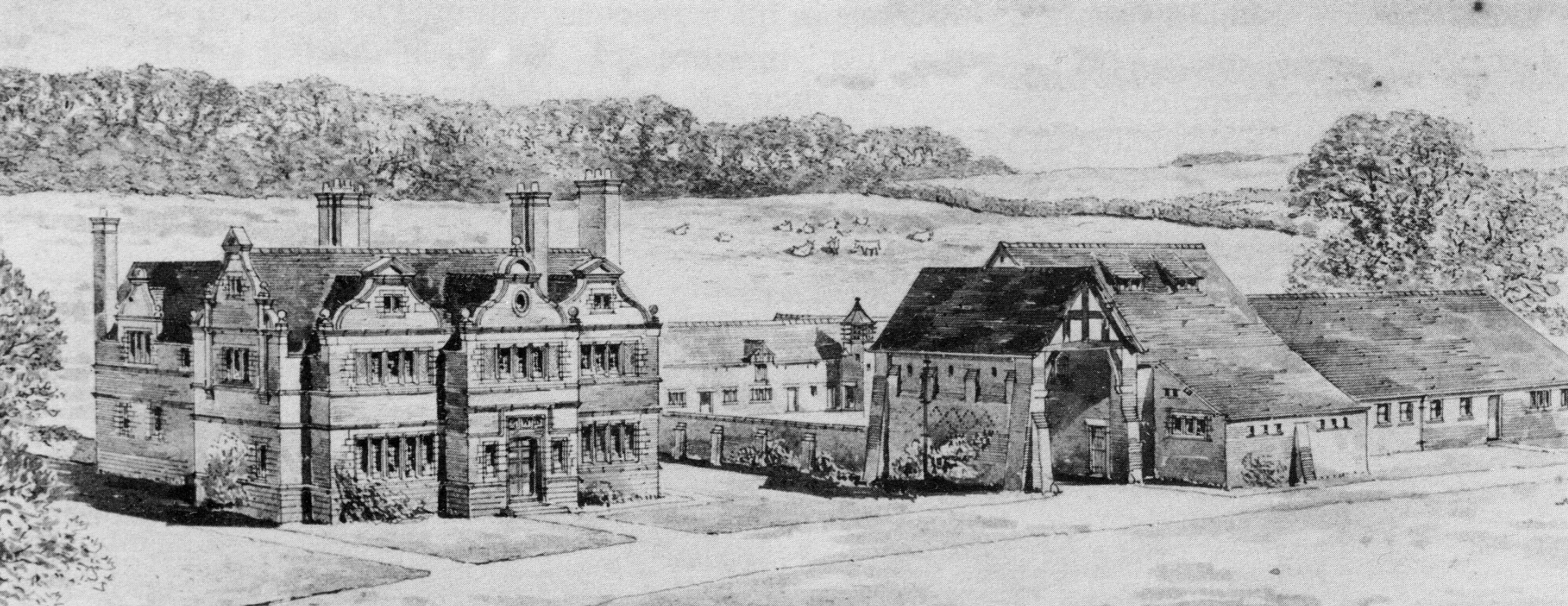
Wrexham Road Farm in 1888

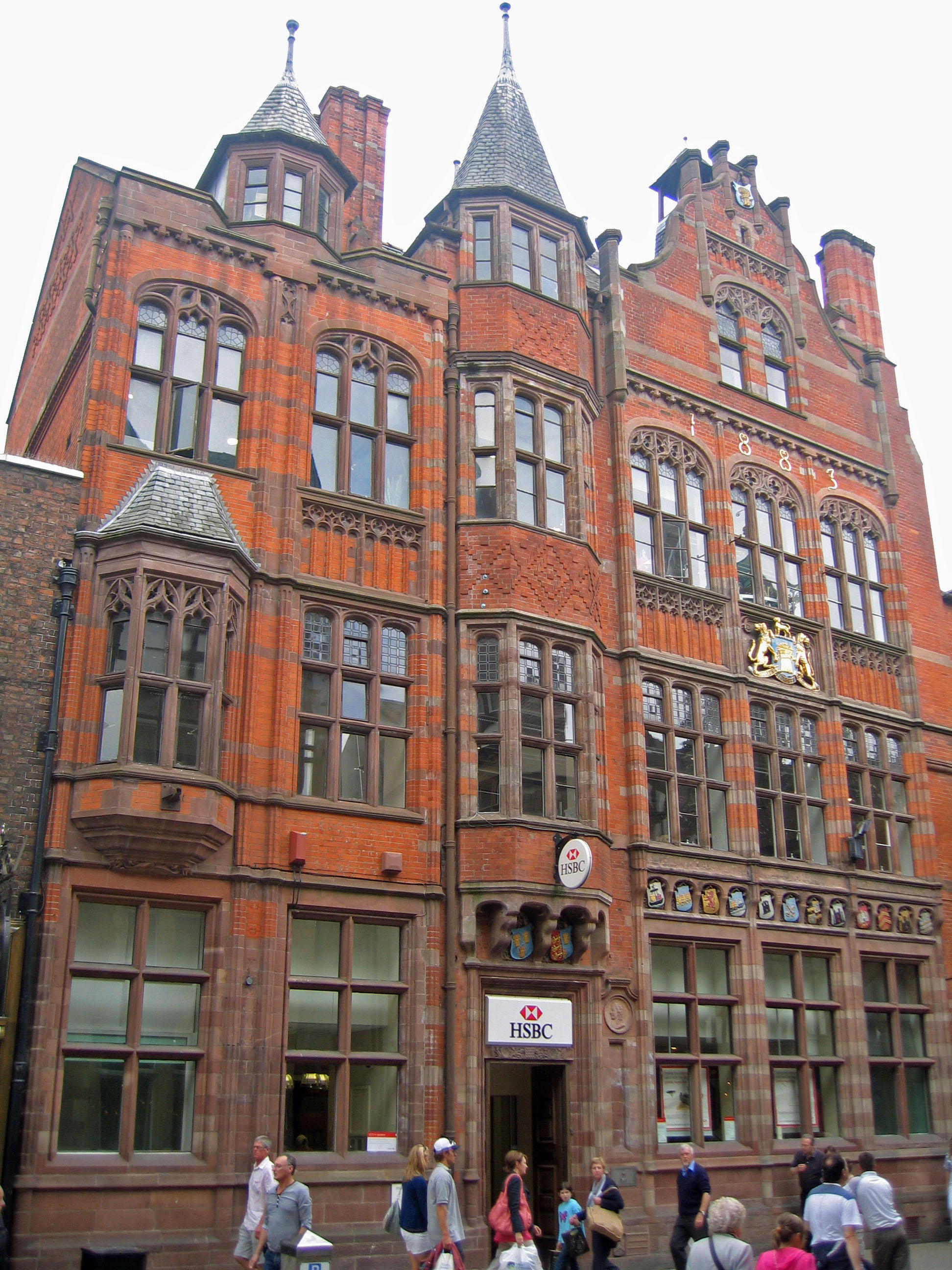
Grosvenor Club and North and South Wales Bank

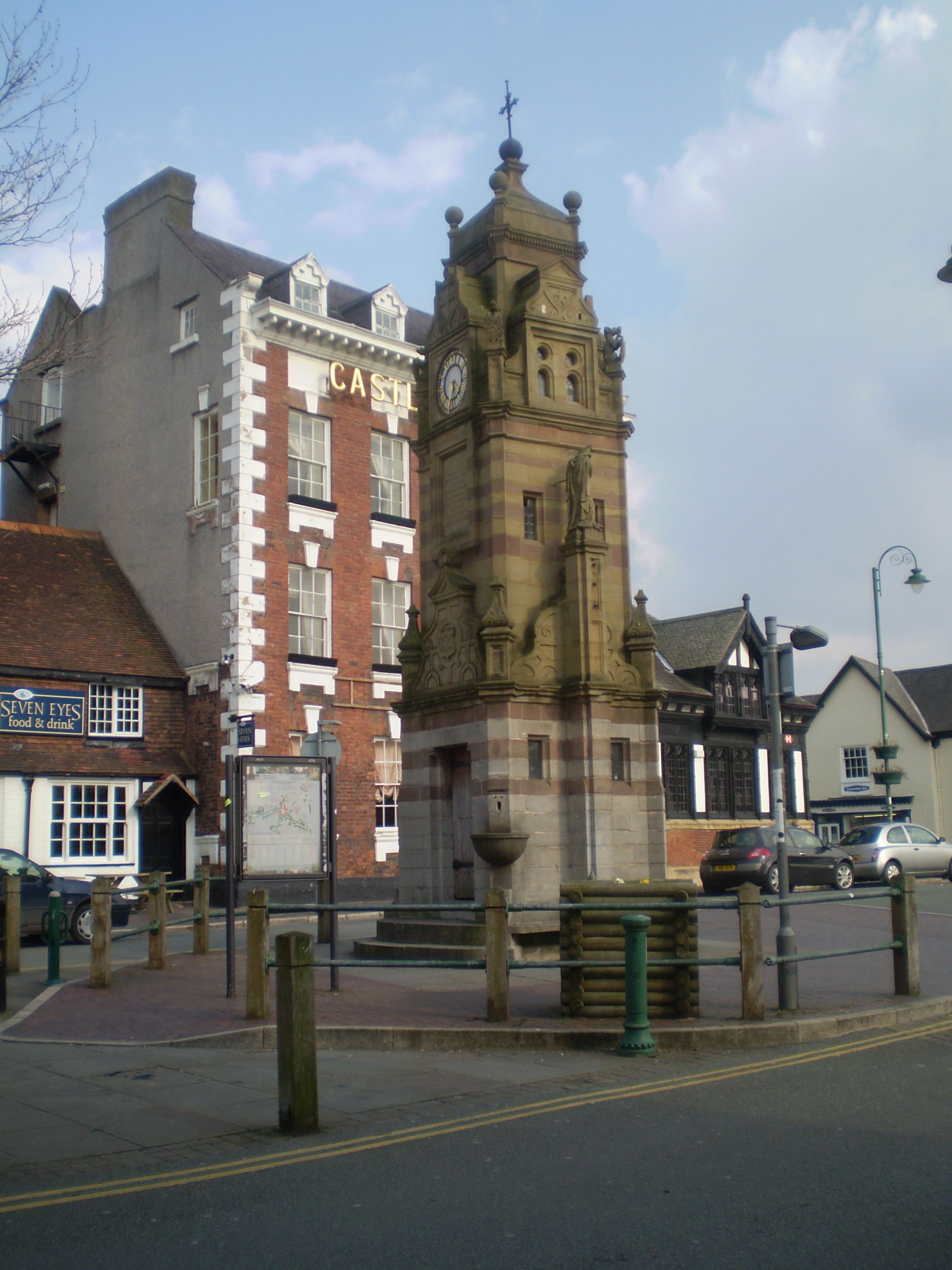
Peers Memorial Fountain and Clocktower

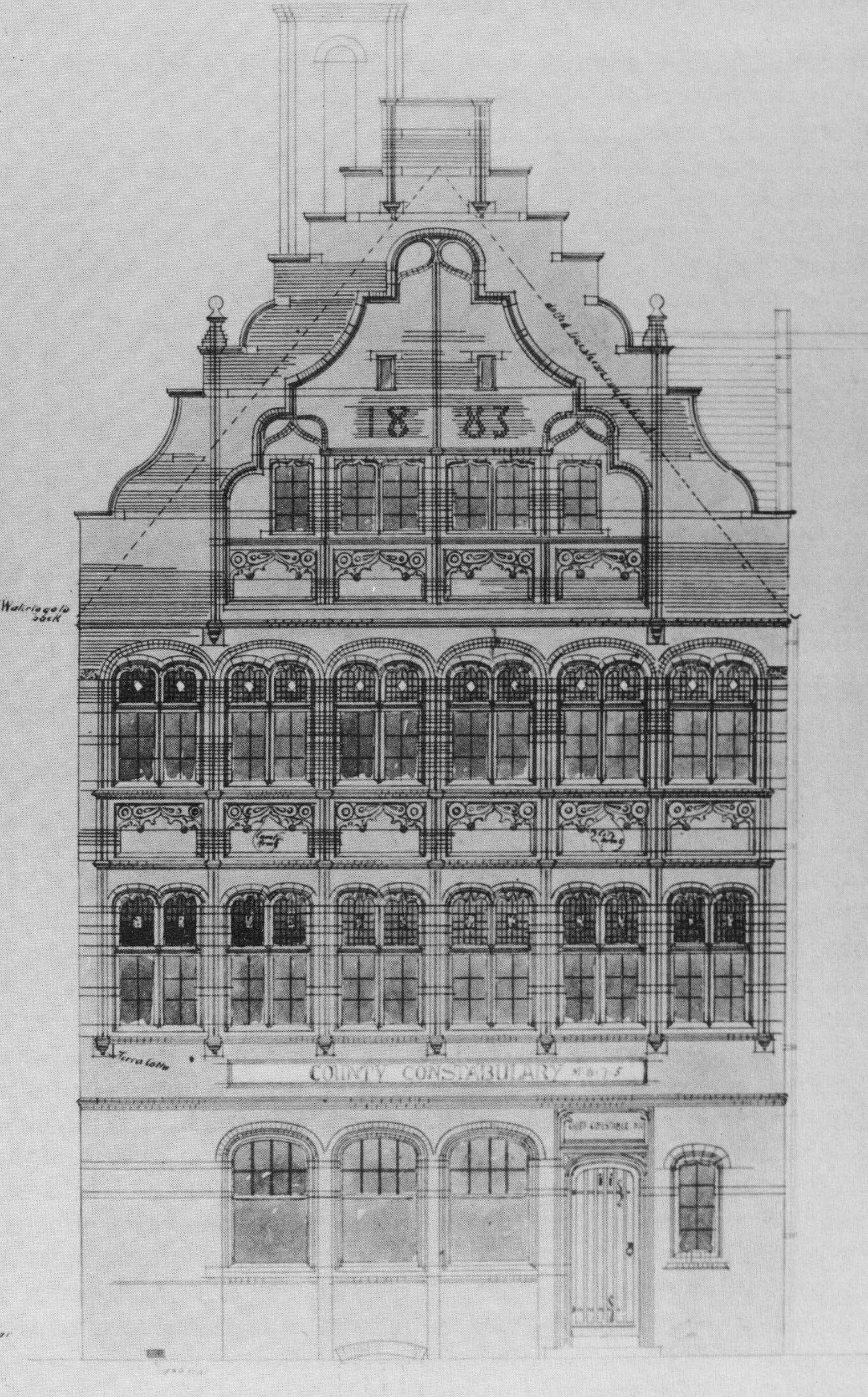
Architect's drawing of Cheshire County Constabulary, now 142 Foregate Street, Chester

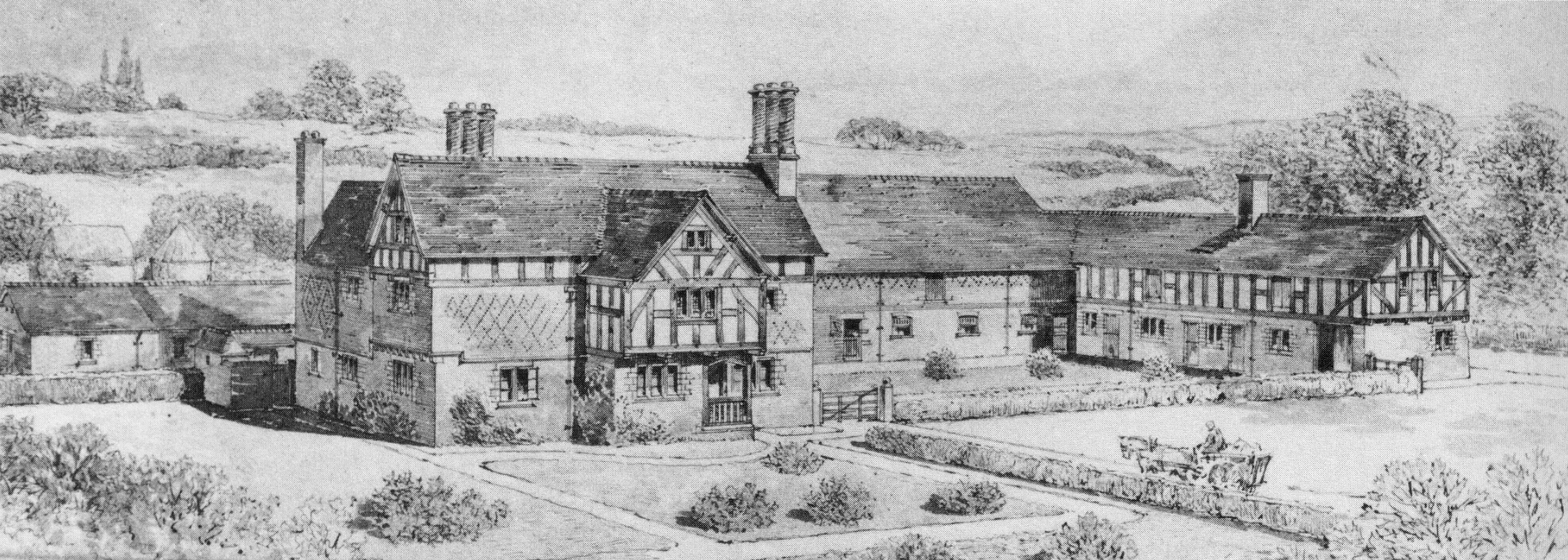
Saighton Lane Farm in 1888

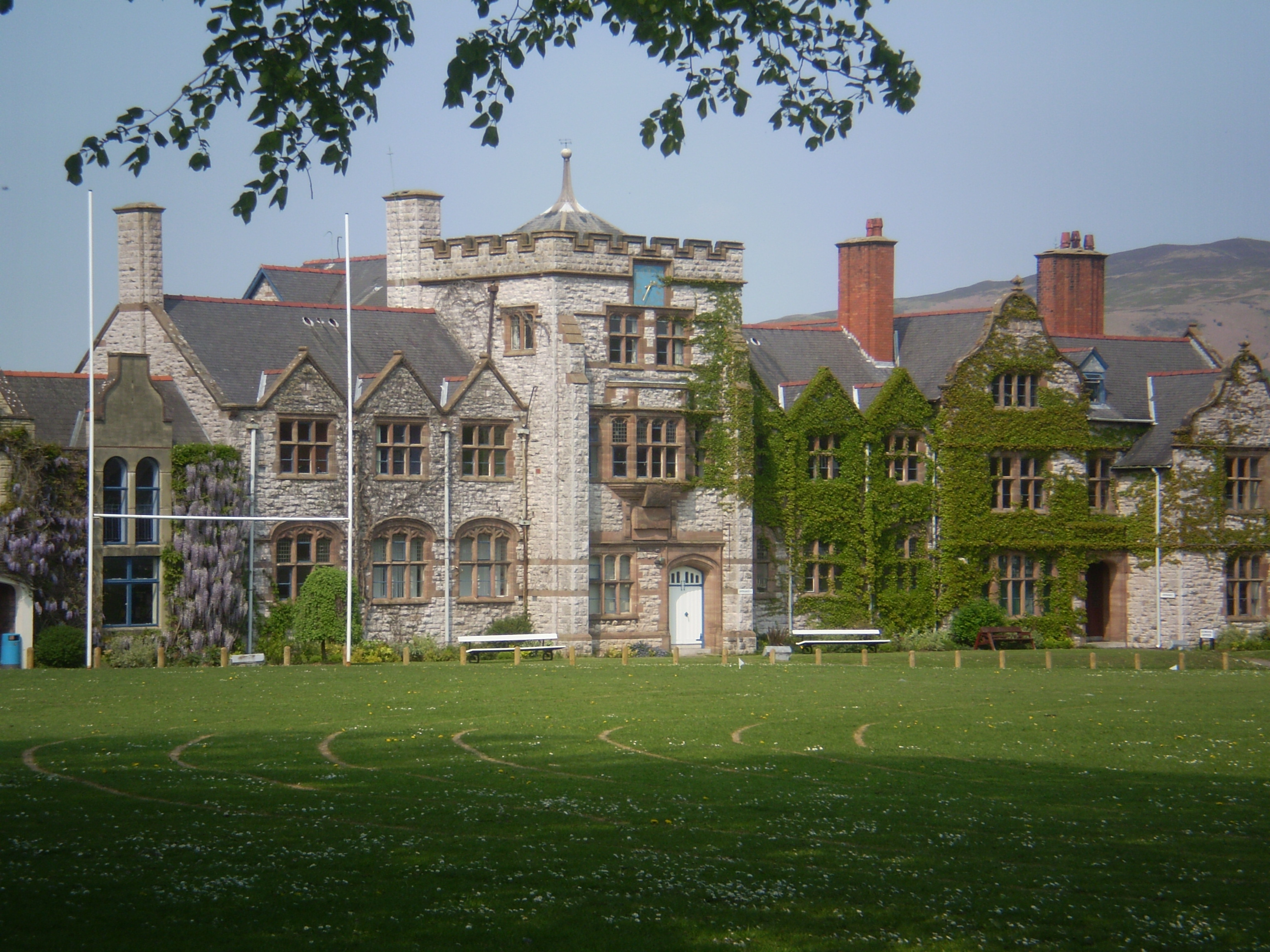
Ruthin School

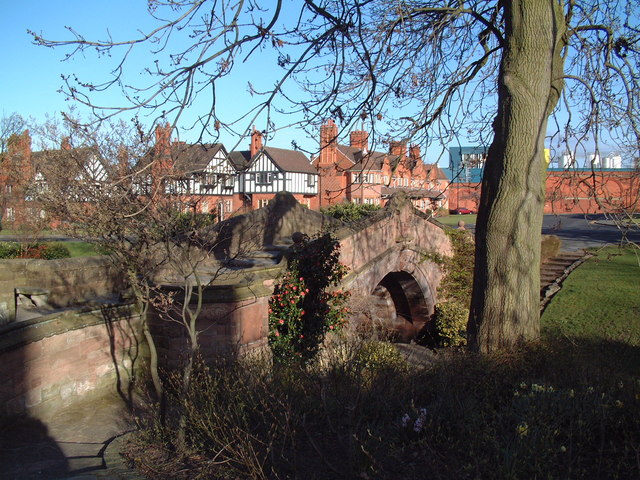
Dell Bridge, Port Sunlight

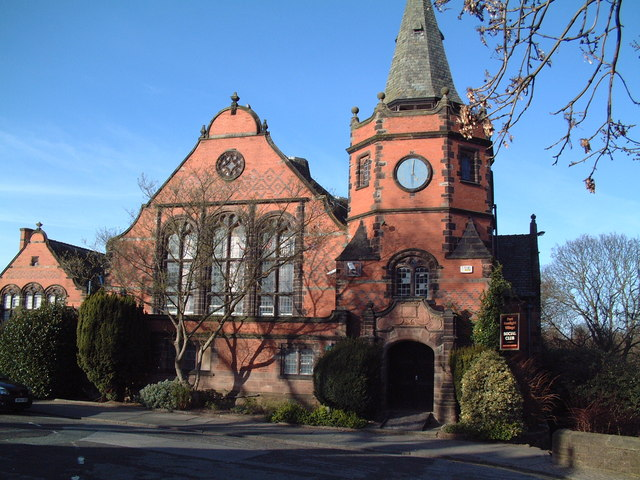
Lyceum, Port Sunlight

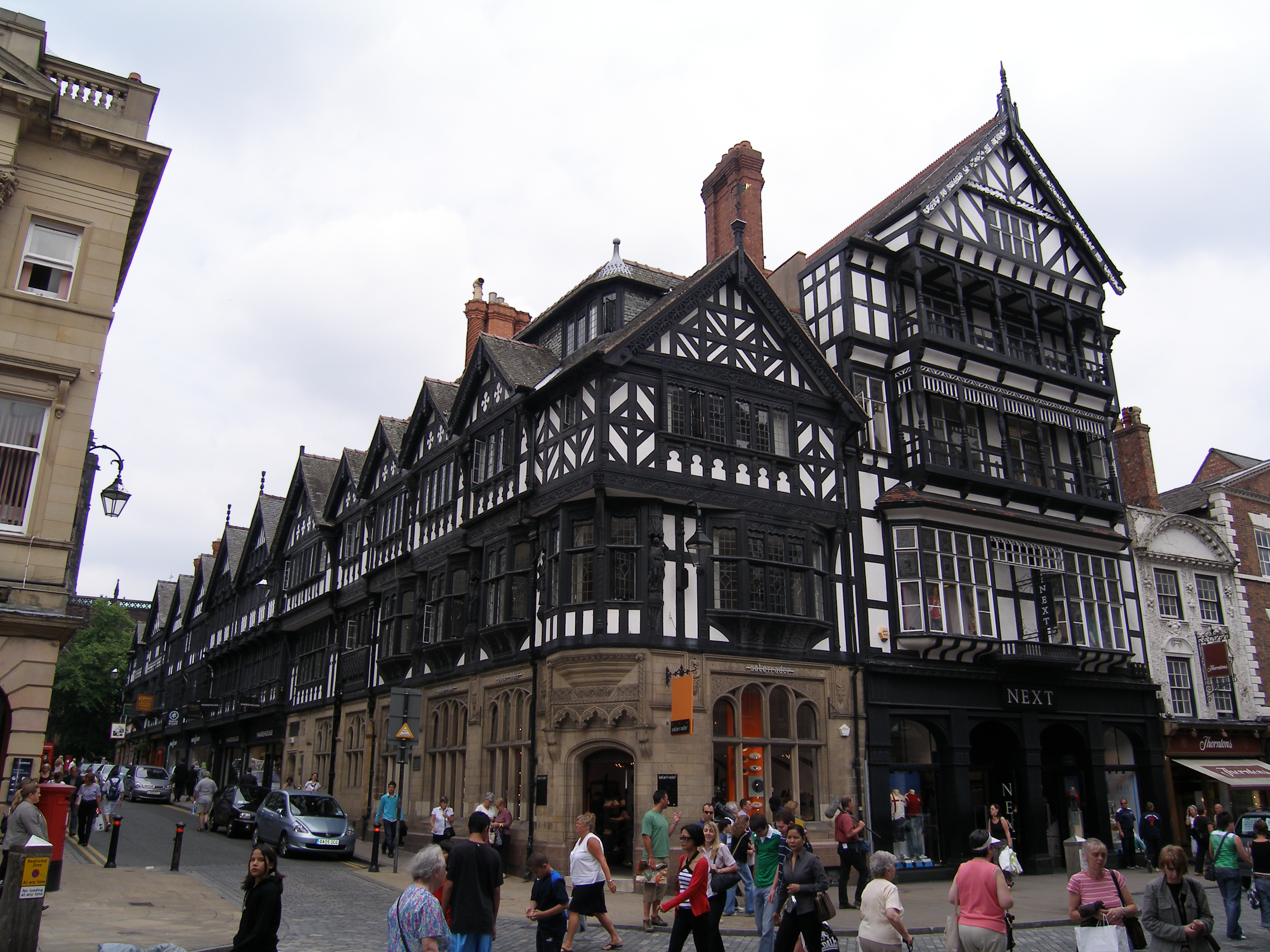
St Werburgh Street, Chester

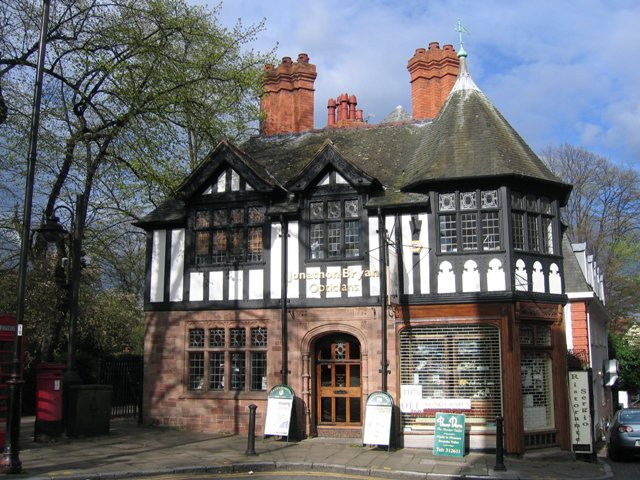
St Oswald's Chambers, Chester

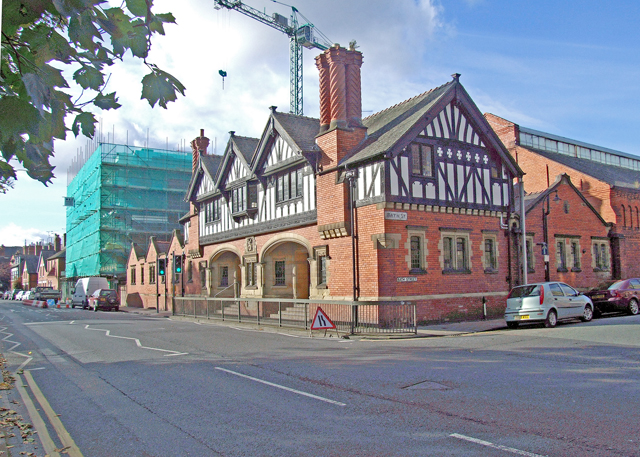
Chester baths

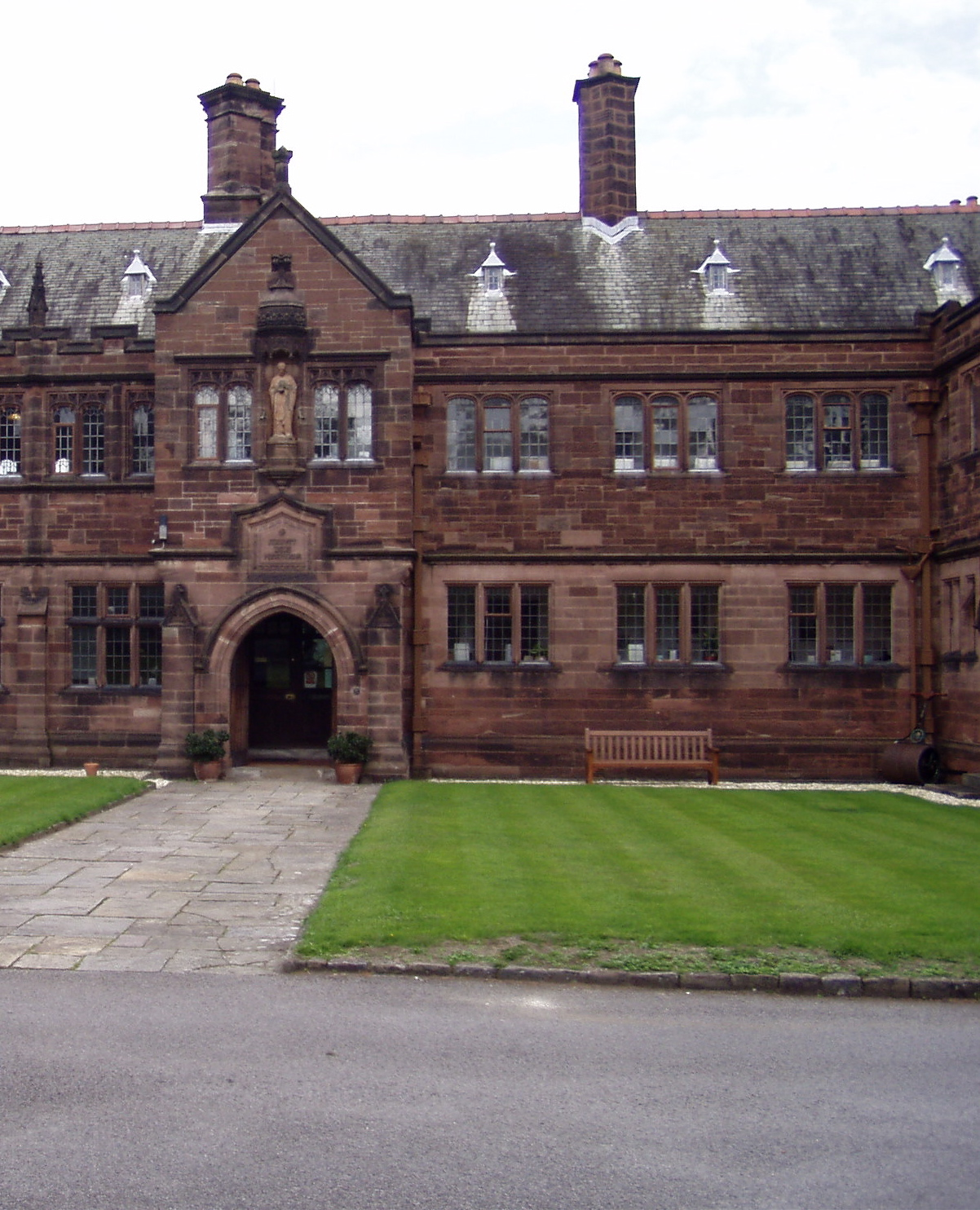
St Deiniol's Library

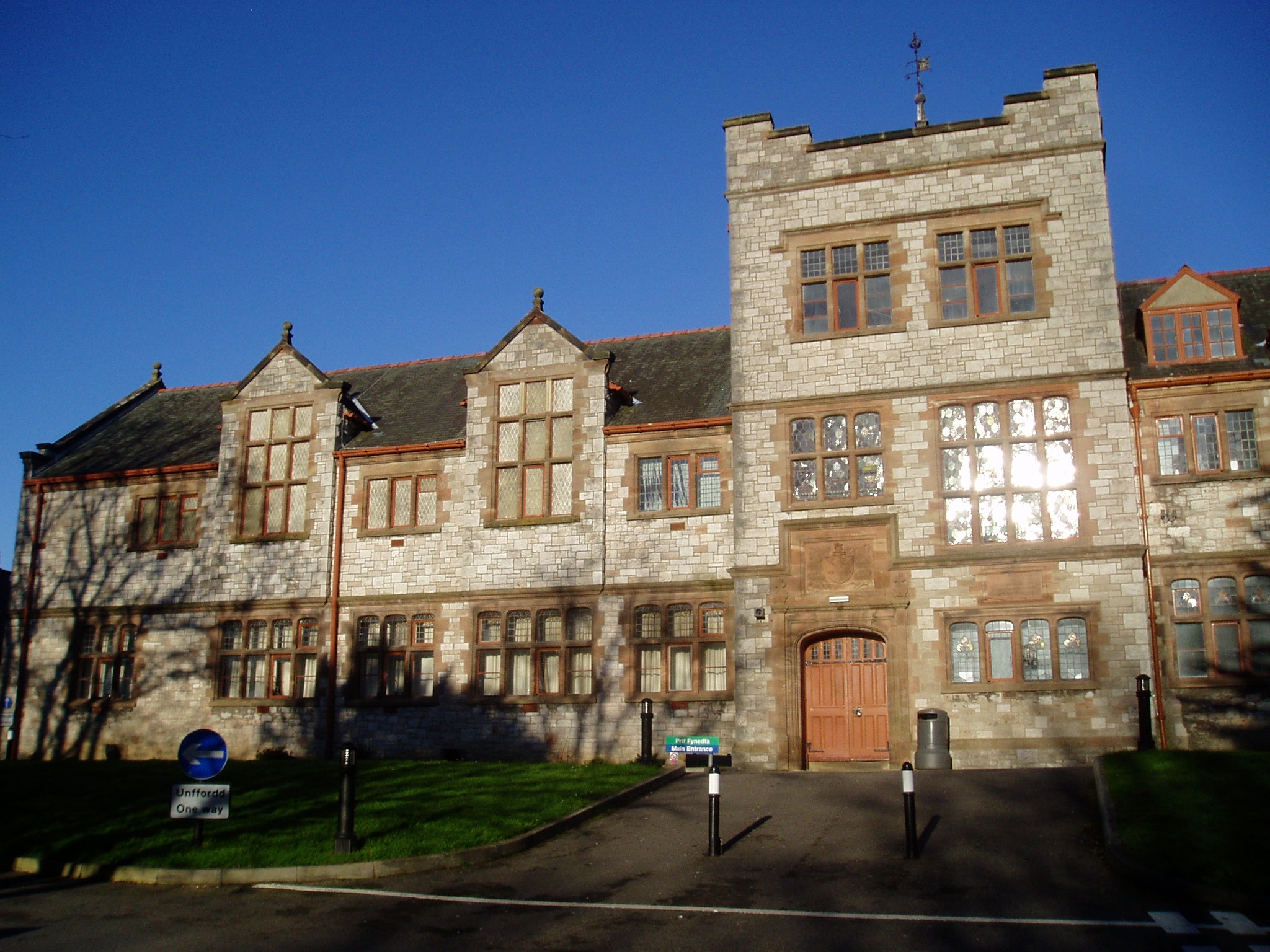
Friars School, Bangor

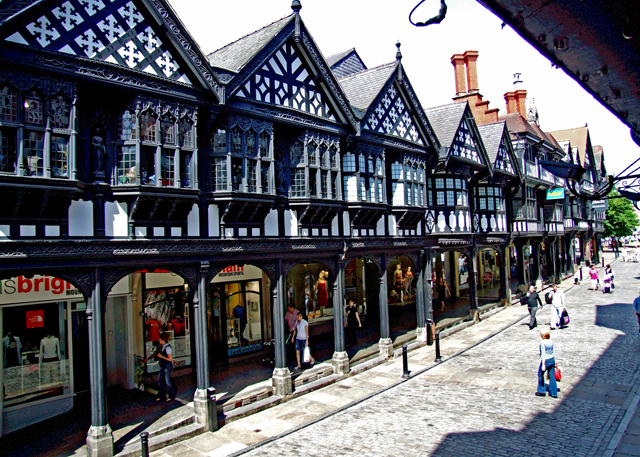
5–9 Northgate Street, Chester

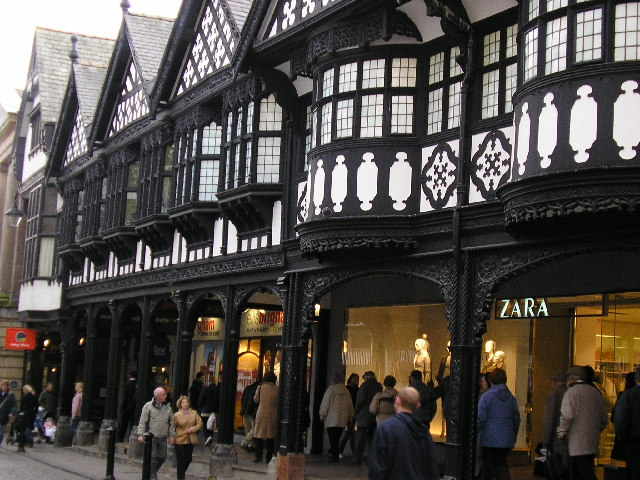
11–13 Northgate Street, Chester

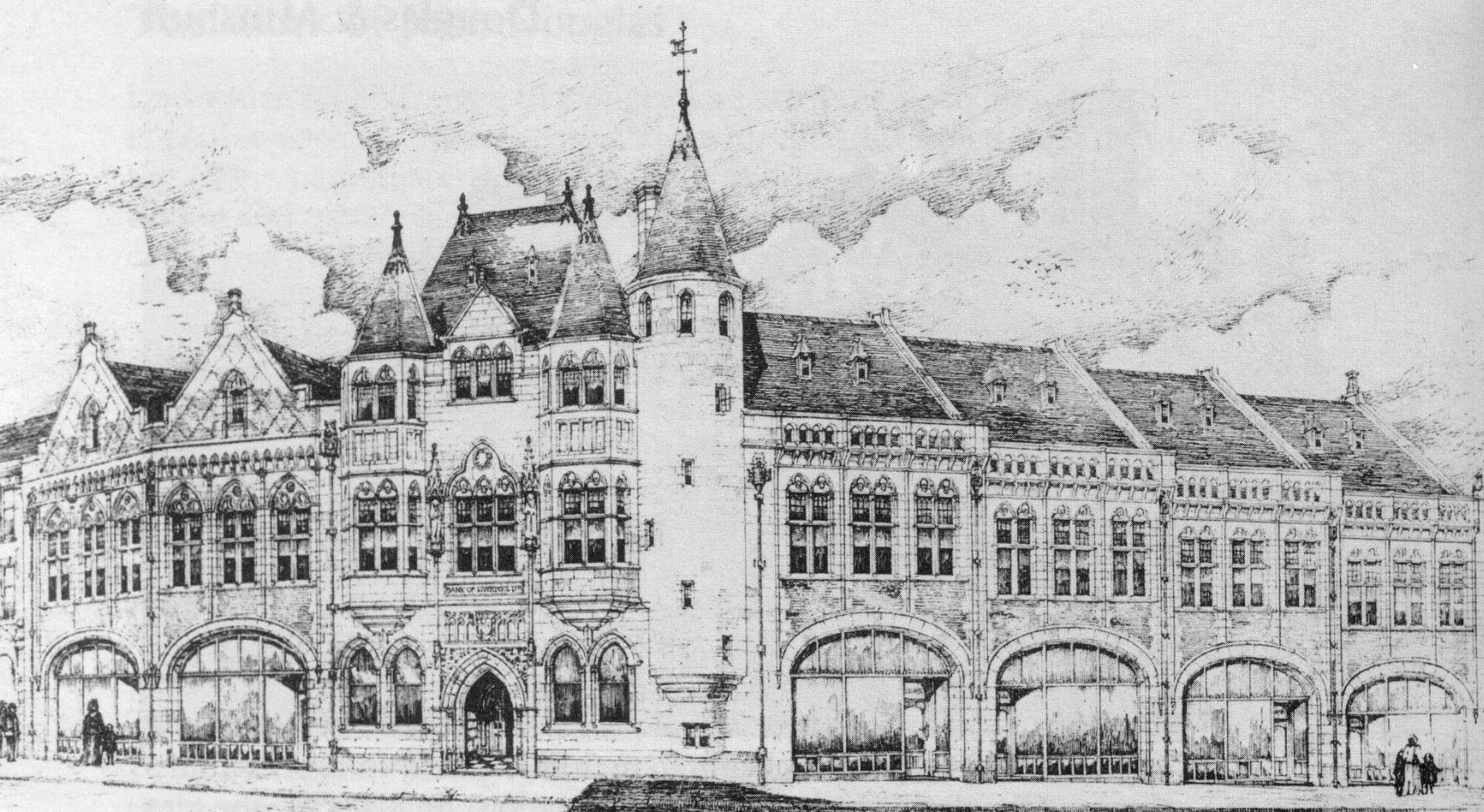
Bank Buildings, Birkenhead 1901

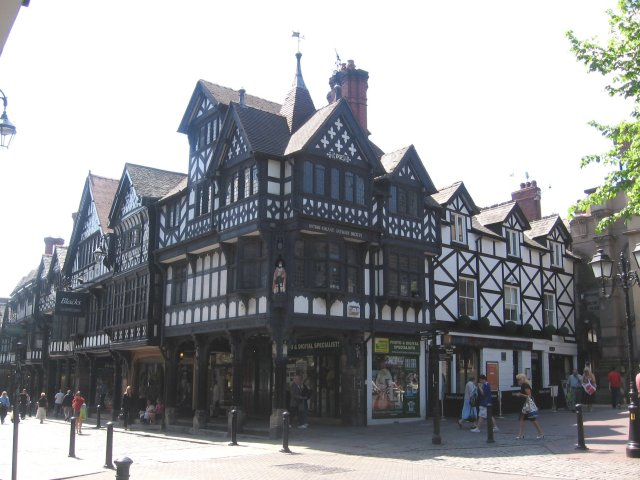
29–31 Northgate Street, Chester

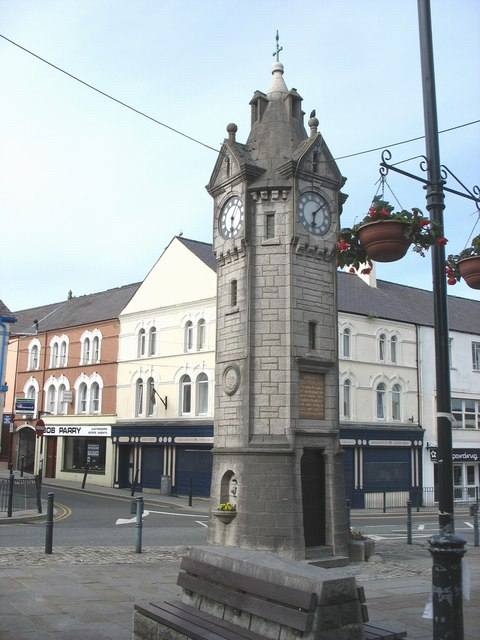
Rayner Memorial Clock Tower

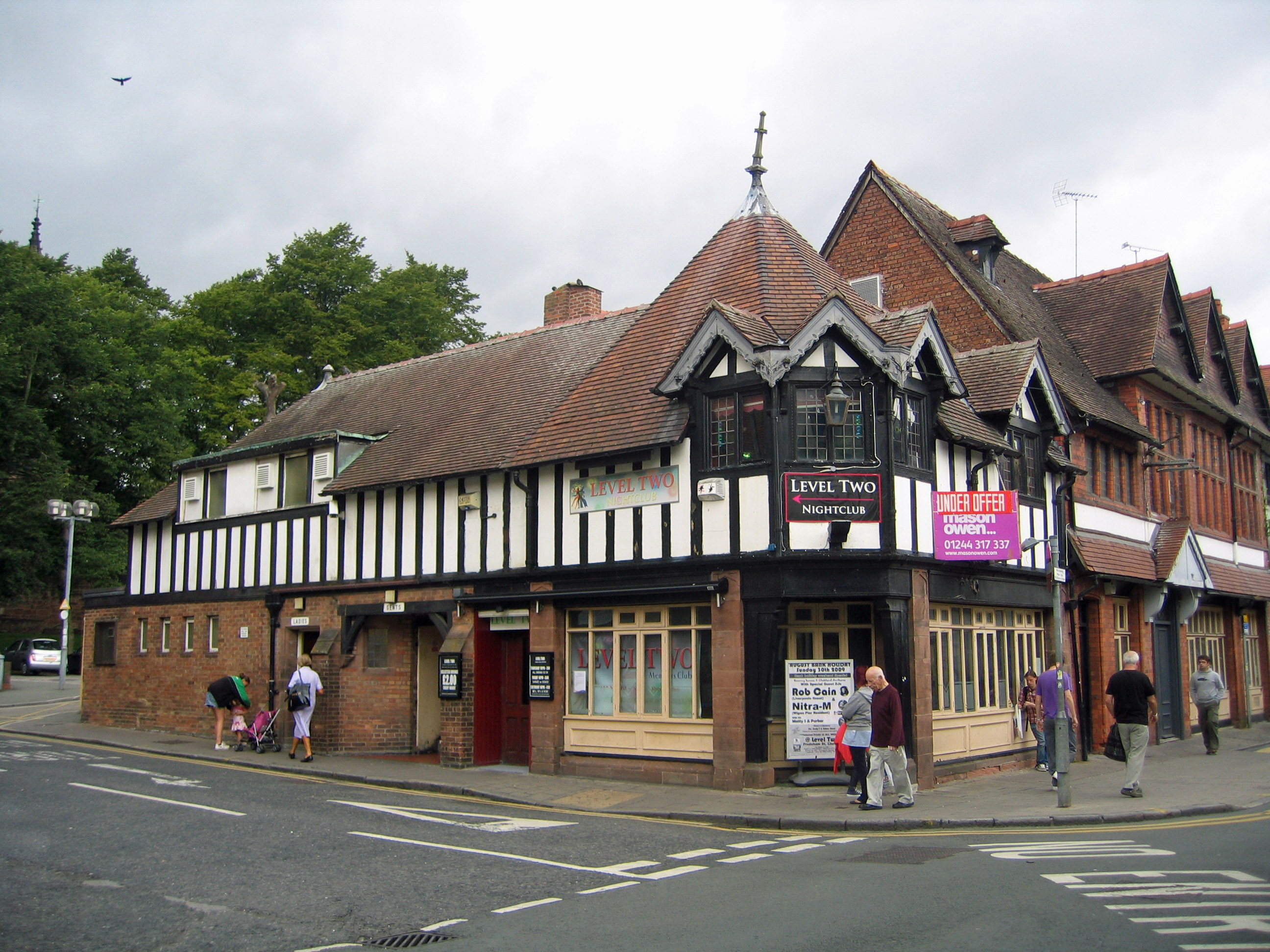
Public conveniences, Chester

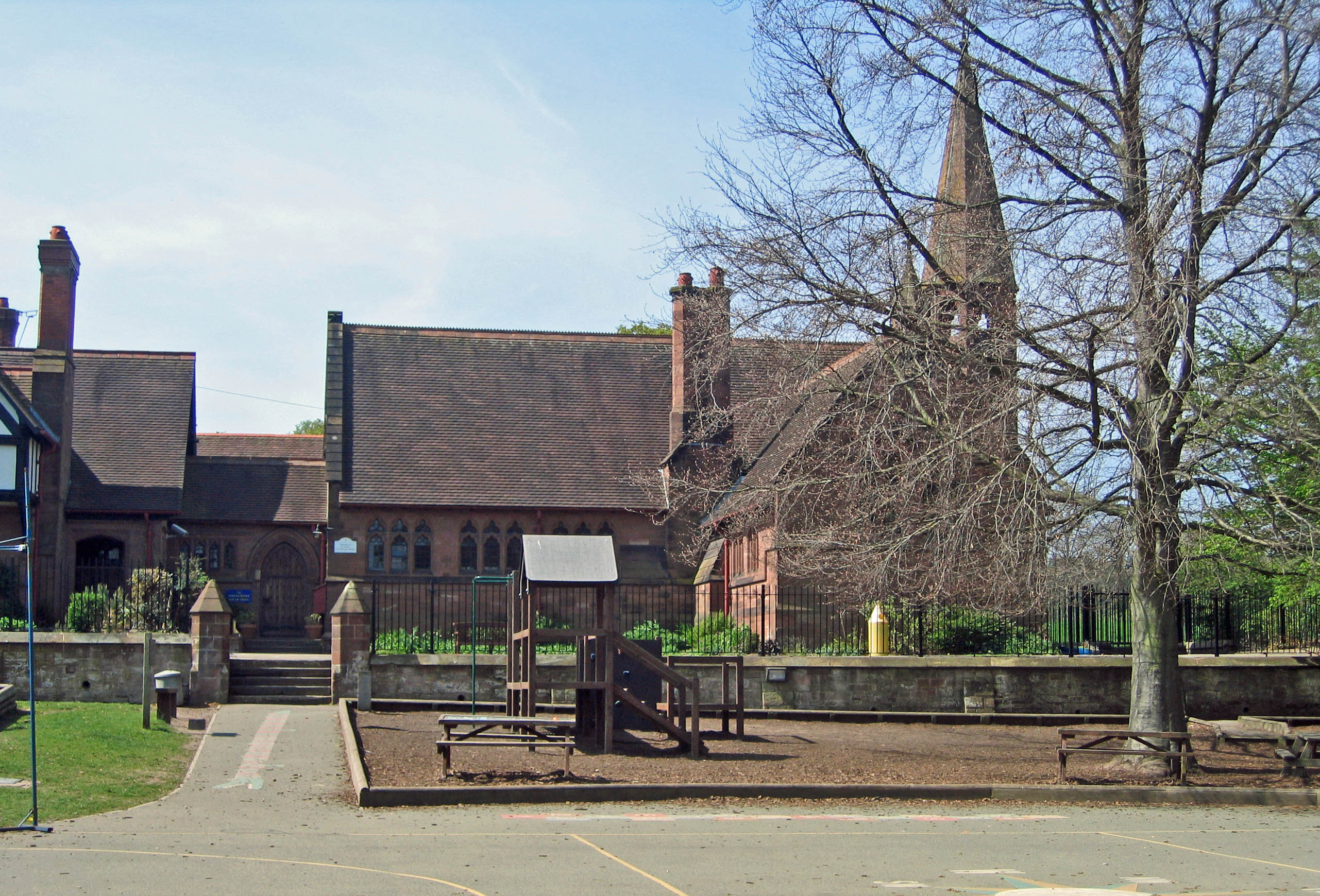
Eccleston school

== See also ==
- List of new churches by John Douglas
- List of church restorations, amendments and furniture by John Douglas
- List of houses and associated buildings by John Douglas
