= 142 Foregate Street, Chester =

Building on the south side of Foregate Street, Chester, Cheshire, England

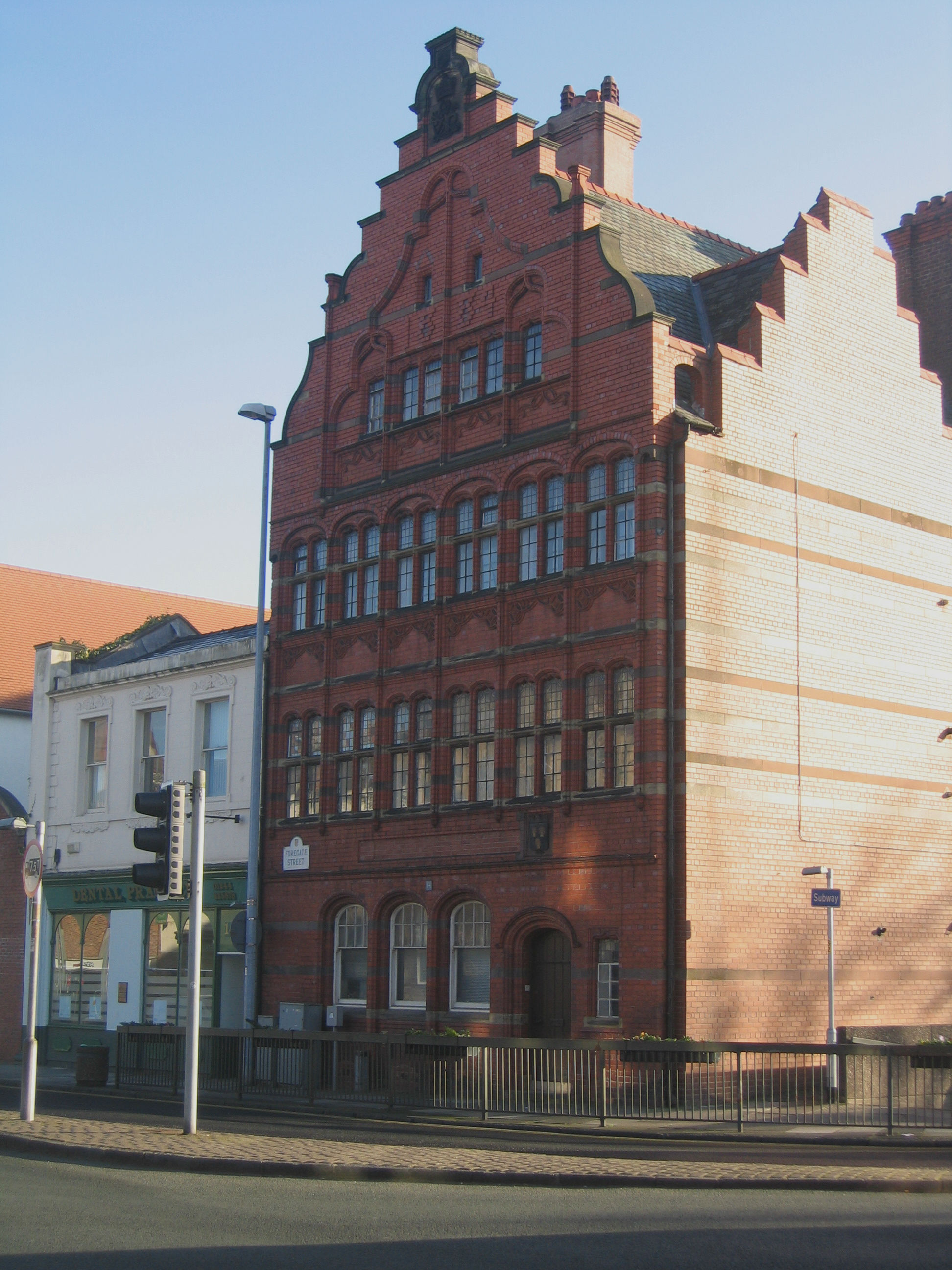
- 142 Foregate Street, Chester

- Location in Cheshire
- 53.1919°N 2.8820°W
- Location: Foregate Street, Chester, Cheshire, England

History
- Built: 1884
- Built for: Chester City Council

Site notes
- Architect: John Douglas

Listed Building – Grade II
- Designated: 10 January 1972
- Reference no.: 1375814

142 Foregate Street is a building on the south side of Foregate Street, Chester, Cheshire, England. It is recorded in the National Heritage List for England as a designated Grade II listed building.

== History ==
It was built in 1884 for Chester City Council as a police station for the Cheshire County Constabulary, and was designed by the local architect John Douglas. It was used as the police headquarters until 1967 when a new building for the purpose was constructed on Nuns Road next to the Roodee. In the early 2000s it was being used as an occupational health unit for Cheshire County Council.

== Architecture ==
The building is constructed in red Ruabon brick with stone bands and terracotta and stone dressings, and a grey slate roof. It has three storeys plus an attic. On the ground floor two steps lead to an arched doorway. To the left of this are three arched sash windows and to the right is a casement window. The middle and top storeys contain six two-light mullioned and transomed windows in pairs. The gable is stepped and contains a row of six windows, over which are two more windows. Between these is the date 1884 in brick moulding. In the apex of the gable is the cartouche of the police force. Douglas' biographer Edward Hubbard considered that the frontage of this building was "more specifically Flemish in design than any other of Douglas' buildings".

== See also ==
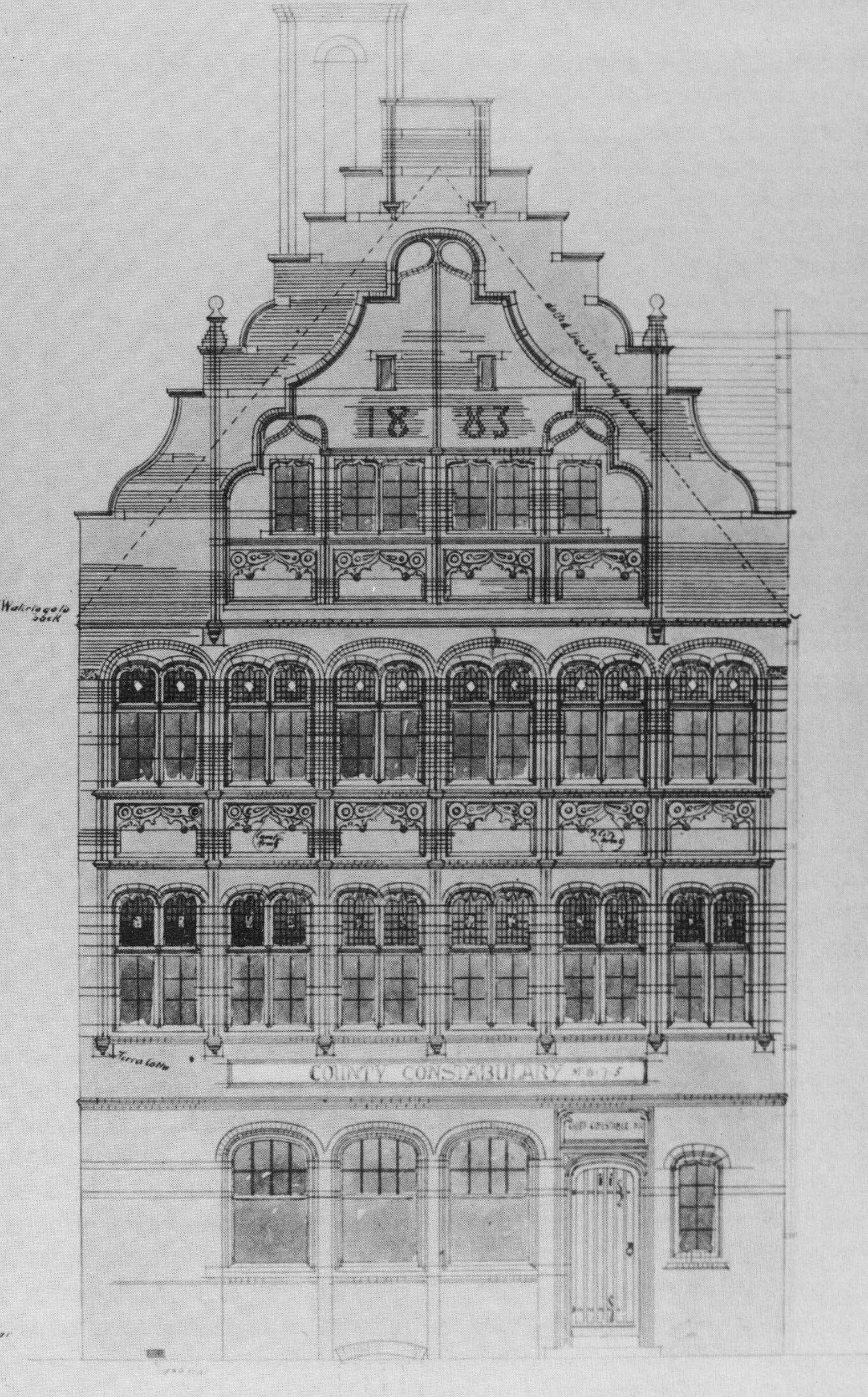
Architect's drawing 1884

- Grade II listed buildings in Chester (east)
- List of non-ecclesiastical and non-residential works by John Douglas
