= St Werburgh's Mount, Chester =

St Werburgh's Mount
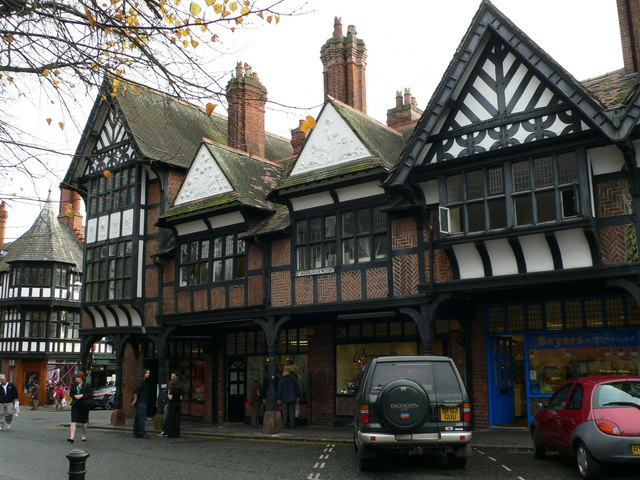
- 19–25 St Werburgh Street

- Location in Cheshire
- 53.1913°N 2.8904°W
- Location: 15–27 St Werburgh Street, Chester, Cheshire, England

History
- Built: 1873–74
- Built for: G. Hodgkinson

Site notes
- Architect: John Douglas

Listed Building – Grade II
- Designated: 10 January 1972
- Reference no.: 1376390, 1376391

St Werburgh's Mount consists of a range of shops at 15 to 27 St Werburgh Street, Chester, Cheshire, England, on the south side of the street facing Chester Cathedral. The range is recorded in the National Heritage List for England as two designated Grade II listed buildings.

== History ==
The building was designed by the local architect John Douglas as shop premises for his client G. Hodgkinson. It had been intended to submit the plans to the Improvement Committee of Chester City Council at the same time as those for St Werburgh Chambers, an adjacent suite of offices for the same client. However the submission was delayed because Douglas was ill, and the shops were built in 1873–74, about a year later than the offices.

== Architecture ==
=== 19–27 St Werburgh Street ===
This consists of a terrace of five shops that directly face the cathedral. They are timber-framed with herring-bone brick nogging and some plaster panels; they are roofed in brown tiles. On the ground floor, all the shops have modern fronts. The upper storeys protrude towards street and are supported by a colonnade of seven timber posts set on sandstone plinths. The easternmost shop, number 19, has three storeys; the others have two.

The upper two storeys of number 19 contain an oriel window on a coved apron, which stretches through both storeys. The window in each storey has six lights; in the middle storey it has two transoms, and in the top storey there is one. Between the windows are four panels containing floral pargeting. The jettied gable contains quadrant and herring-bone braces and plaster panels. The bargeboards also contain panels and at the summit of the gable is a terracotta finial. Numbers 21 and 23 are similar to each other and smaller than the shops on each side. In the upper storey of these are six-light casement windows. Their gables have coved jettying and contain pargeting with patterns of leaves and flowers. Numbers 25 and 27 again are similar to each other. They both have six-light oriel windows above coved jettying. Above each window is a gable similar to that at number 19.

=== 15 and 17 St Werburgh Street ===
These shops stand to the east of the above range and are attached to them. They are sited on the corner where the street curves round to the south. The building has a triangular plan and two storeys. The ground floor is constructed in brick with stone dressings and the upper storey is timber-framed. Number 15 has a modern shop front in the lower storey, and a six-light mullioned and transomed casement window above. Beneath and to the sides of the windows are square panels. Over the window is a hipped roof with a gable containing pargeting. In the ground floor of number 17 is a doorway over which is a stone lintel inscribed with the date 1874. The upper storey has two small windows and square panels. Its hipped roof sweeps up to that of number 19.

== See also ==
- Grade II listed buildings in Chester (central)
- List of non-ecclesiastical and non-residential works by John Douglas
