= Waverton school and schoolmaster's house =

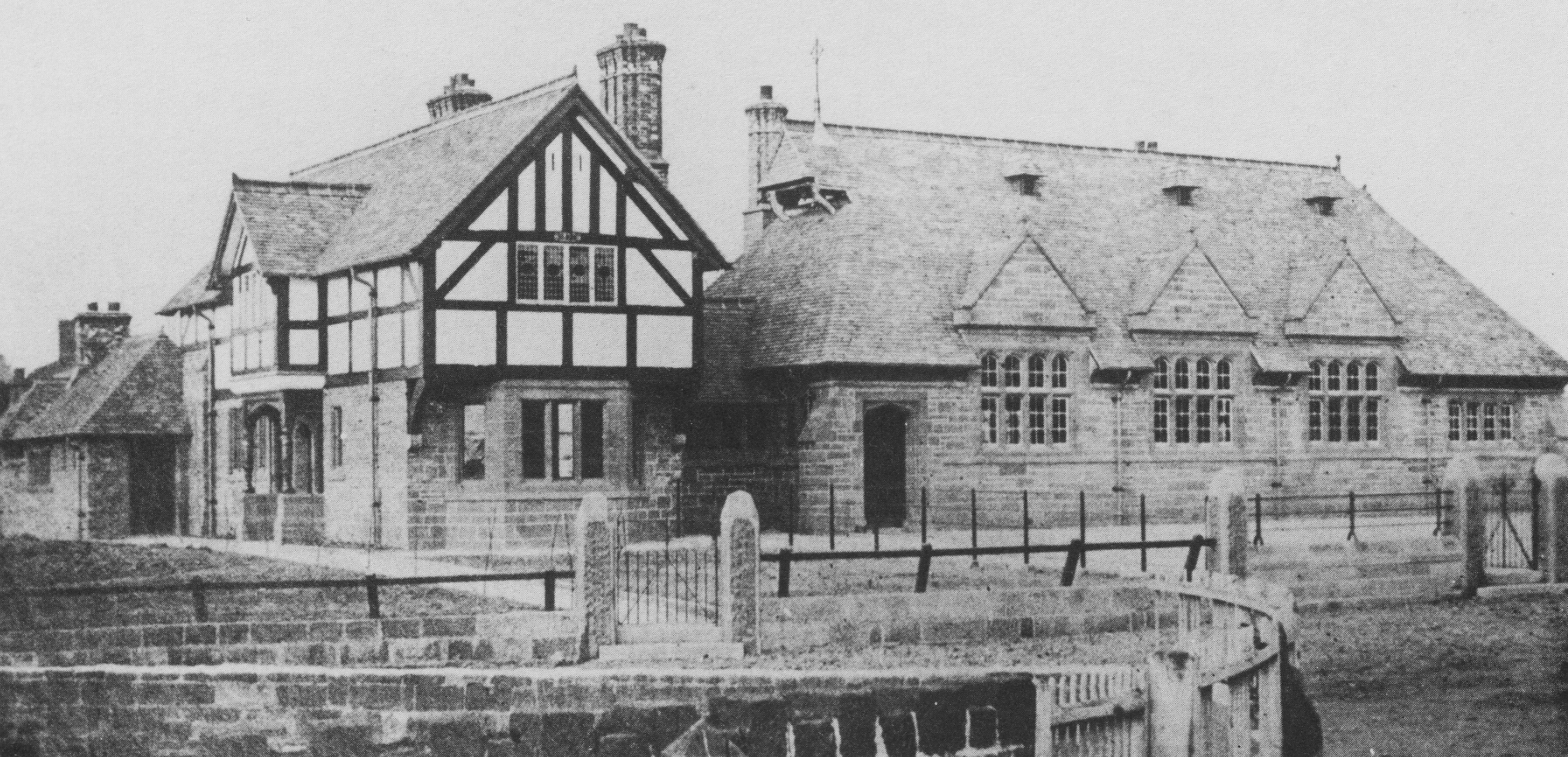
- Photograph of the school and house taken about 1880

- Location in Cheshire
- 53.1649°N 2.8069°W
- Location: Waverton, Cheshire, England

History
- Built: 1877
- Built for: 1st Duke of Westminster

Site notes
- Architect: John Douglas

Listed Building – Grade II
- Designated: 30 January 1985
- Reference no.: 1330262

Waverton school and schoolmaster's house are in the village of Waverton, Cheshire, England. The combined structure is recorded in the National Heritage List for England as a designated Grade II listed building.

== History ==
The school and the house were built in 1877 for the 1st Duke of Westminster and designed by the Chester architect John Douglas. The schoolmaster's house is still in use as a house, while the school is now a day nursery and after school club.

== Architecture ==
=== School ===
This is constructed in red ashlar sandstone with a red tile roof. It is in one storey and its south front has five bays. Each of the central three bays has four-light mullioned and transomed window under a stone-coped gable with a finial. In the left bay is an arched doorway and in the right bay is a four-light mullioned window. The roof is hipped and contains three gabled ventilators. At the left end of the roof is a bellcote.

=== House ===
The house is connected to the school by a single-storey passage. It has two storeys; the lower storey is constructed in orange brick on a stone plinth, and the upper storey is timber-framed. The roof is in red tiles and there are two chimneys. The main (west) front of the house has three bays. The doorway is in the central bay; over this is an oriel window supported by wooden columns under a gable. To the left of the door is a five-light mullioned window. A pair of small outbuildings with hipped roofs are attached to the left side of the house. The south aspect of the house has a canted window in the lower storey under a jettied timber-framed upper storey supported on wooden brackets. The upper storey contains a four-light casement window with a date inscribed in the beam above it.

== Critique ==
Douglas designed schools for other estate villages, including Aldford, Dodleston and Eccleston. Like Eccleston school, Waverton school is built close to the schoolmaster's house. In each case the buildings are contrasted, the house being partly half-timbered while the school is constructed entirely in stone. Douglas' biographer Edward Hubbard considers that these two schools "are outstanding among Douglas' village schools".

== See also ==
- Listed buildings in Waverton, Cheshire
- List of non-ecclesiastical and non-residential works by John Douglas
