= Public baths, Chester =

Public Baths, Chester
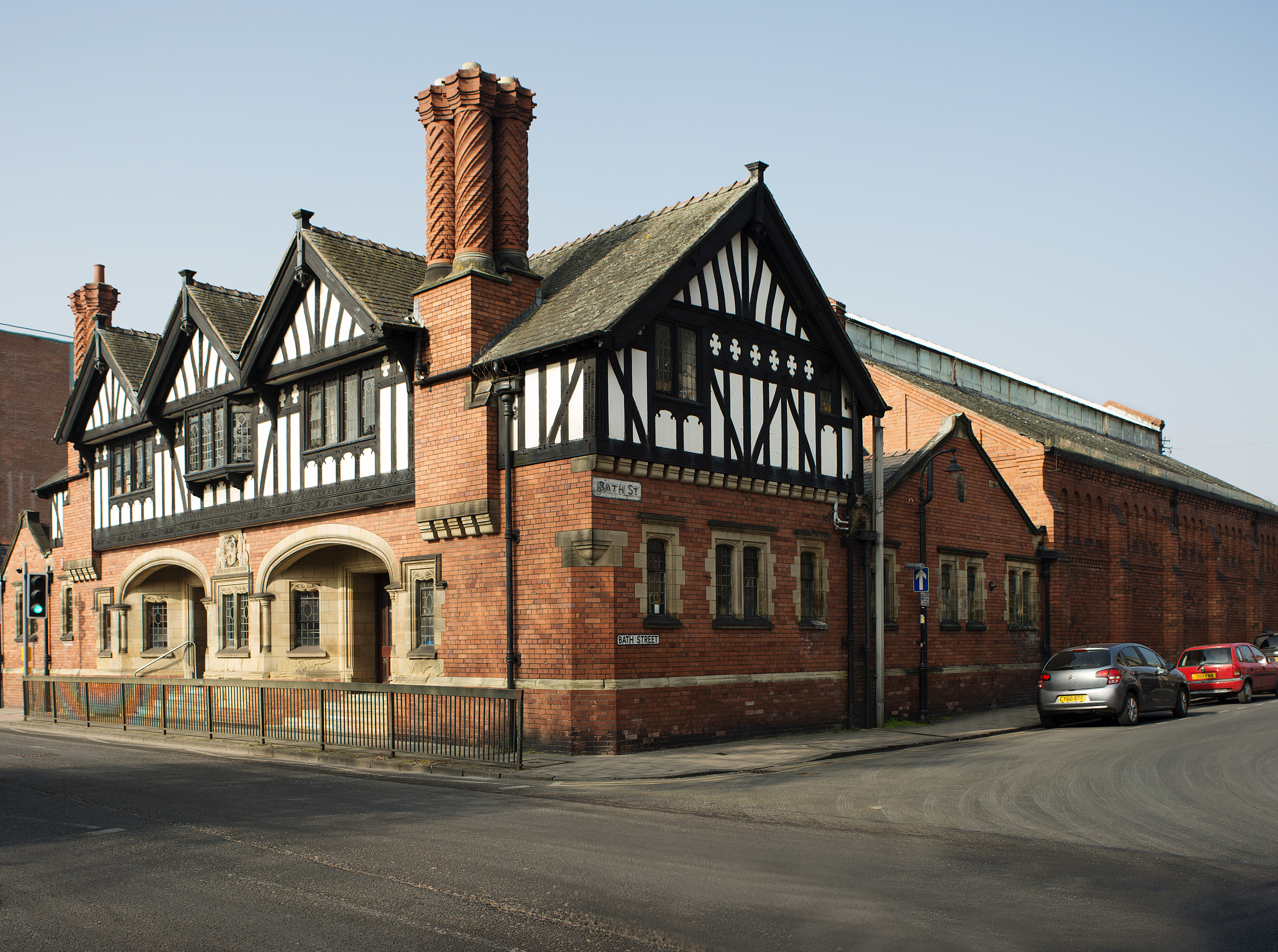
- Chester baths

- Location in Cheshire
- 53.1907°N 2.8829°W
- Location: Union Street, Chester, Cheshire, England

History
- Built: 1898–1901
- Built for: Chester City Council

Site notes
- Architect: John Douglas
- Governing body: Chester Swimming Association

Listed Building – Grade II
- Designated: 10 January 1972
- Reference no.: 1375957

The Public Baths are on the north side of Union Street at its junction with Bath Street in Chester, Cheshire, England. The structure is recorded in the National Heritage List for England as a designated Grade II listed building.

== History ==
The public baths were built for Chester City Council between 1898 and 1901 and were designed by the local architect John Douglas on whose land they were constructed. It was an unusual commission for Douglas, as most of his previous designs had been for churches and houses. Designing the baths involved "technical complexity and specialist engineering work". During the design process Douglas advised that because of possible leakage through the concrete linings of the baths, it should be replaced by a bituminous lining at an additional cost of £150 (equivalent to £16,000 in 2025); the council agreed to this.

In the 1970s the city council were building Northgate Arena, a leisure complex which included a swimming pool, and they stated that they would not be able to afford to run both this and the old baths. However the City of Chester Swimming Club were of the opinion that the new baths would not be suitable for competitive swimming or for water polo. The Chester Swimming Association was formed and they took over the management of the baths on 14 April 1977. They made improvements to the building, including the installation of gas central heating and a new water filtration system, the addition of a kitchen, cafeteria and gymnasium, and strengthening of the structure. The slipper bath was replaced by a clubroom and bar.

== Architecture ==
The structure is partly in two storeys and partly in one storey. The frontage on Union Street is in two storeys. The lower storey is in red Ruabon brick with stone dressings, the upper storey is half-timbered, and the decorated chimney stacks are brick. Behind the frontage are the swimming baths and the boiler house is at the rear. The frontage is symmetrical; the small wing at the left originally contained the caretaker's flat and a slipper bath. The ground floor contains two arched entrances, each with double doors and windows. Between the entrances is a pair of ogee-headed windows, over which is a stone panel containing the city's coat of arms. The upper storey is jettied and has three gables. Beneath the middle gable is a five-light mullioned canted oriel window, and under the outer arches are four-light mullioned casement windows. Internally there are two swimming baths. The larger, the Atlantic, 25 yards (23 m) long, is deep enough for diving, and is surrounded by galleries. The other bath, the Pacific, is 20 yards (18 m) long.

Douglas' biographer, Edward Hubbard, commenting on the utilitarian nature of the building, stated that the domestic architectural style of its frontage "bears little relation in plan or character to what lies behind".

== See also ==
- Grade II listed buildings in Chester (east)
- List of non-ecclesiastical and non-residential works by John Douglas
