= Rayner Memorial Clock Tower =

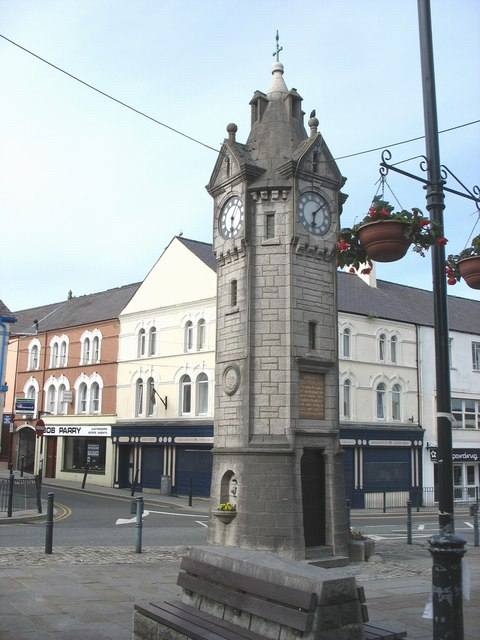
- Rayner Memorial Clock Tower
- Interactive map of Rayner Memorial Clock Tower
- 53.255772°N 4.310752°W
- Location: Bulkeley Square, Llangefni, Isle of Anglesey, Wales

History
- Built: 1902
- Built for: In memory of George Pritchard Rayner

Site notes
- Architect: John Douglas
- Architectural style: Gothic Revival

Listed Building – Grade II
- Designated: 10 November 1986
- Reference no.: 5739

The Rayner Memorial Clock Tower stands in front of the Town Hall in Bulkeley Square, Llangefni, Ynys Mons, Wales. It is designated by Cadw as a Grade II listed building.

== History ==
The tower was built in 1902 and designed by the Chester architect John Douglas. It was erected in memory of George Pritchard Rayner who died in Bloemfontein Hospital in 1900.

== Architecture ==
The clock tower is built in limestone in Gothic Revival style. It is polygonal in plan with clock faces on the four cardinal sides. On the south side is an arched entrance and on the east and west sides are water spouts in metal lion-heads. Under the east spout is a trough and under the west spout is a smaller basin. Above the entrance is a granite plaque with a gilded inscription. The clock faces protrude and are supported by corbels. Over each clock face is a gable containing a vent in the tympanum and surmounted by a ball finial. At the top of the tower is a small conical spire with lucarnes and a weather vane.

== See also ==
- List of non-ecclesiastical and non-residential works by John Douglas
