= Peers Memorial, Ruthin =

Peers Memorial
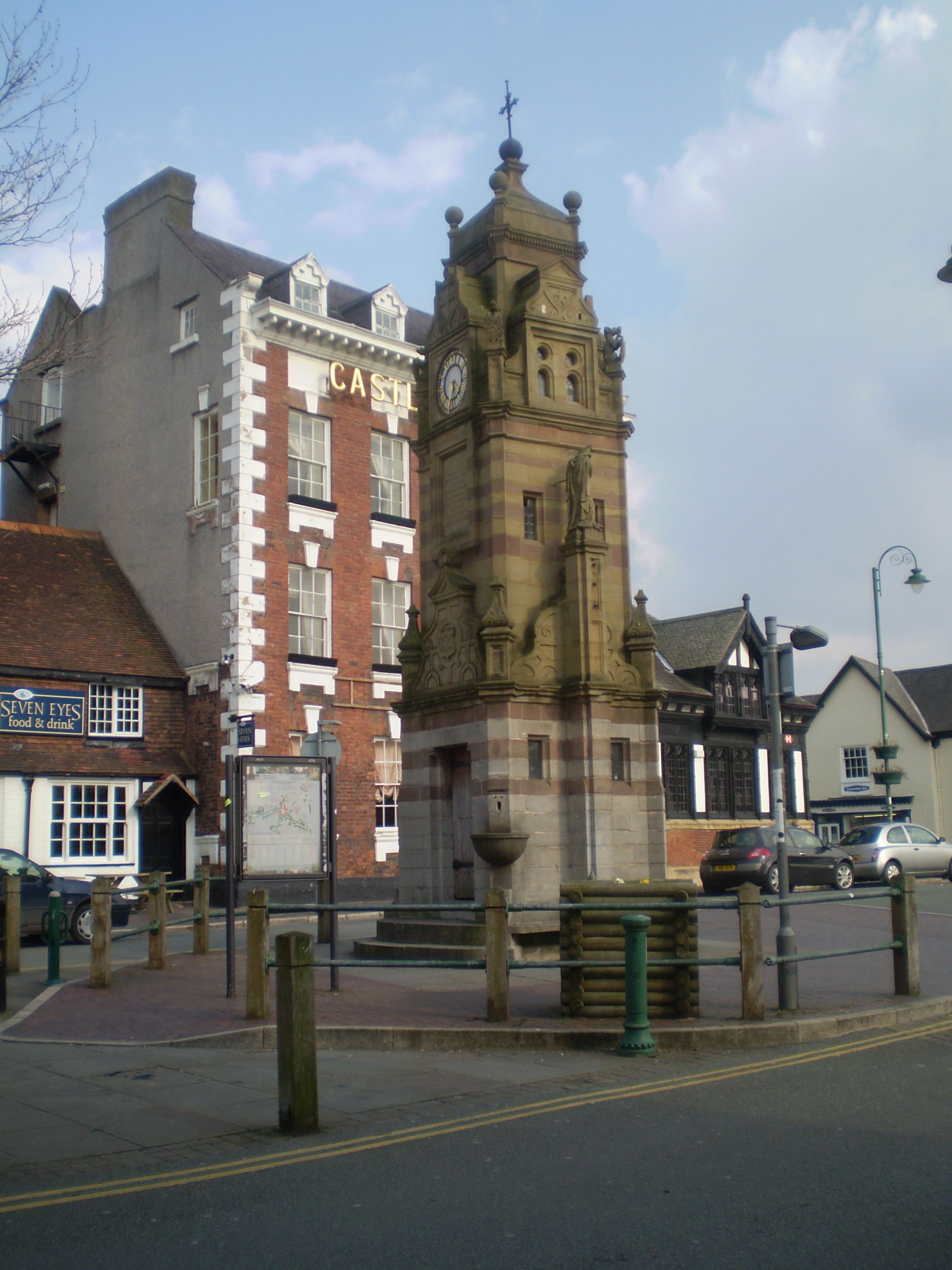
- Peers Memorial
- Interactive map of Peers Memorial
- 53.114616°N 3.310578°W
- Location: St Peter's Square, Ruthin, Denbighshire, Wales

History
- Built: 1883

Site notes
- Architect: John Douglas

Listed Building – Grade II
- Official name: Peers Monument
- Designated: 30 December 2005
- Reference no.: 87339

Peers Memorial is in St Peter's Square, Ruthin, Denbighshire, Wales. It is designated by Cadw as a Grade II listed building.

== History ==
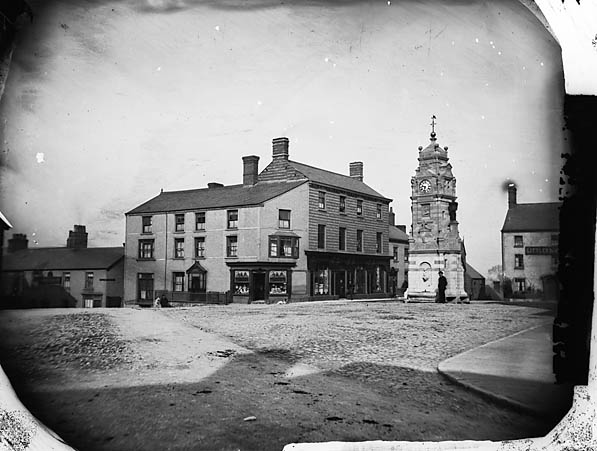
Photograph of St Peter's Square by John Thomas, c. 1875

The memorial stands on the site of a previous town hall, which was built in 1663 and demolished in 1863. It was constructed in 1883 to commemorate Joseph Peers JP during his lifetime, and was designed by the Chester architect John Douglas.

== Architecture ==
The structure consists of a combined clock tower, horse trough and drinking fountain that incorporates Jacobean motifs. It is built in three stages, each stage being narrower than the one below. The whole structure is in stone; the lowest stage is in grey stone with red sandstone bands, and the two upper stages are in yellow sandstone with red sandstone bands. At each corner is a buttress which includes a panel, and is surmounted by a pinnacle with a finial. The front of the memorial faces south. The lowest stage of the front face includes an arch with a water spout directed towards a water trough; at the rear there are two curved steps leading to a door. At the northwest angle is a small stone basin, while on the east and west sides there are low stone seats. In the middle stage, there are panels on the front and the rear. The panel on the front contains the bust of a man, and in the panel on the rear is an inscription commemorating Joseph Peers. On the east and west sides of this stage are buttresses supporting statues. The top stage has clock faces under shaped gables at the front and the rear, while on the other sides there are lancet windows, also under gables. There are ball finials at each corner at the top of the memorial, and on the apex is another ball finial surmounted by a weather vane.

In 2024 the grade II listed Joseph Peers Memorial Clock Tower was restored following funding from the Clocaenog Wind Farm Community Fund and the National Lottery Heritage Fund.

== See also ==
- List of non-ecclesiastical and non-residential works by John Douglas
