= 30 Bridge Street, Chester =

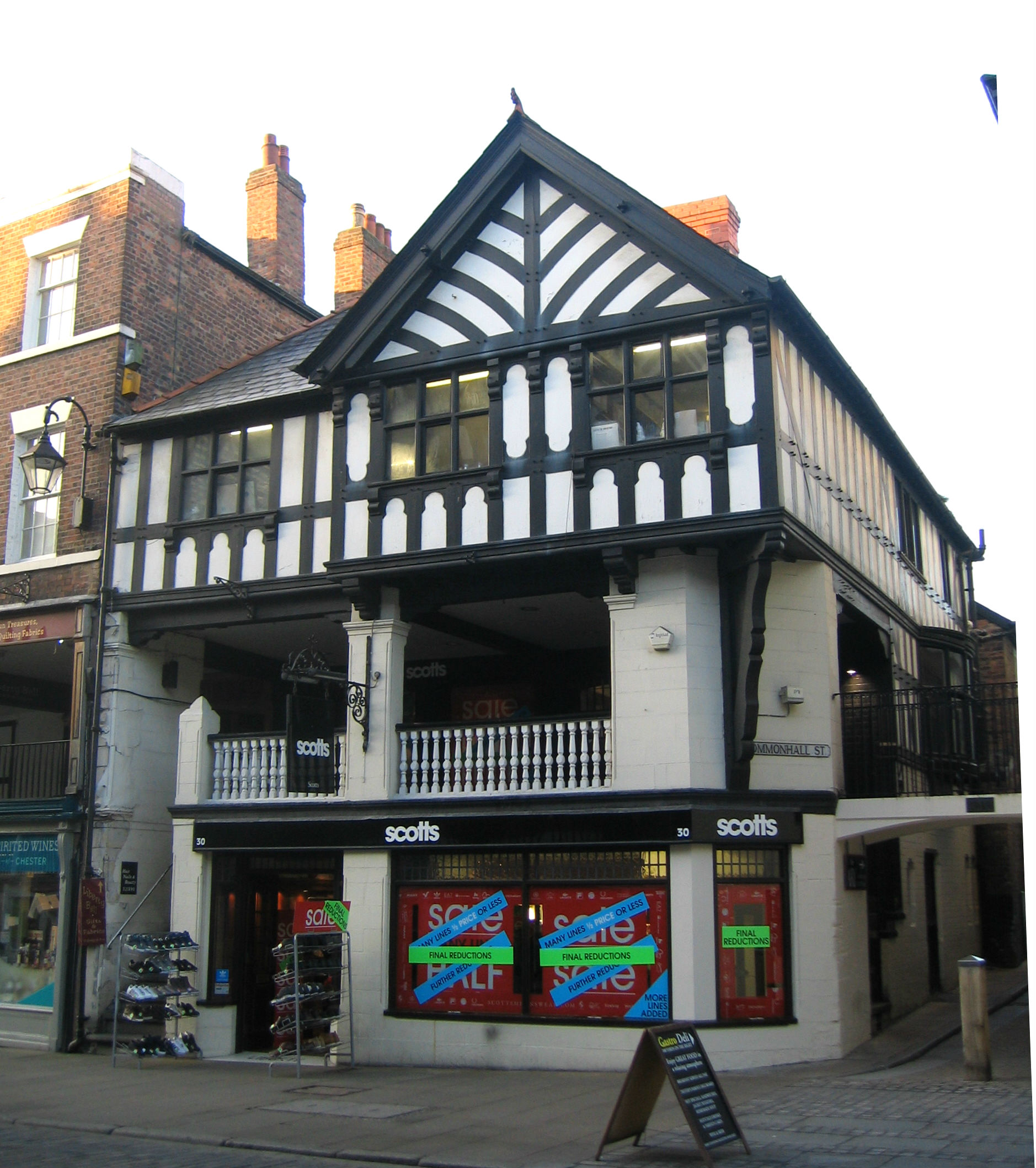
- 30 Bridge Street, Chester

- Location in Cheshire
- 53.1895°N 2.8915°W
- Location: Chester, Cheshire, England

History
- Built: 1900

Site notes
- Architect: Douglas and Minshull

Listed Building – Grade II
- Designated: 1 January 1989
- Reference no.: 1376076

30 Bridge Street, Chester is a shop in Chester, Cheshire, England. It stands on a corner on the west side of the street and the south side of Commonhall Street, and contains a section of the Chester Rows. It is recorded in the National Heritage List for England as a designated Grade II listed building.

== History ==
The building was originally a town house, then a public house, and is now a shop. Plans for rebuilding it were prepared by the local architect John Douglas in 1873 but were never executed. More modest plans by the same architectural firm, then known as Douglas and Minshull, were submitted to Chester City Council in January 1899. These were amended and then approved in September of that year, and the rebuilding was carried out the following year. At that time the rebuilding was unique in central Chester in that the new building is no higher than the building it replaced. Before rebuilding it had been a public house named the Harp and Crown; after rebuilding it was renamed the Grotto.

== Architecture ==
The building has three storeys plus cellars. The lower two storeys are constructed in painted sandstone on the front facing Bridge Street and in painted brick on the other front. The top storey is timber framed with plaster panels, and the roof is of grey slate and is hipped to the south and to the rear. The corner between the streets is canted. The front facing Bridge Street has stone piers and a modern shop front at street level. To the left of the window is a recessed doorway, and to the left of this are ten stone steps plus one wooden step leading up to the Row. At Row level are railings with a wooden balustrade between stone piers surmounted by capitals, and with a newel at the head of the steps. Behind the railing is a stallboard, then the wooden walkway of the Rows, and at the rear another modern shop front. To the north an S-shaped flight of concrete steps lead down to Commonhall Street, and a concrete footbridge dating from the 1970s leads over the street to the Row of number 28. The top storey is jettied and carried on wooden corbels on the capitals of the piers; the corner is supported by a shaped bracket that extends the full height of the middle storey. The top storey contains three three-light casement windows, with panels below and to the sides. Over the northern two windows is a jettied gable with slightly curved herring-bone struts. At the top of the gable is a bargeboard and a finial. The front facing Commonhall Street contains a variety of windows including a curved oriel window.

== See also ==
- Grade II listed buildings in Chester (central)
- List of non-ecclesiastical and non-residential works by John Douglas
