= Bank Buildings, Birkenhead =

Grade II listed building in Birkenhead, Wirral, England

Bank Buildings
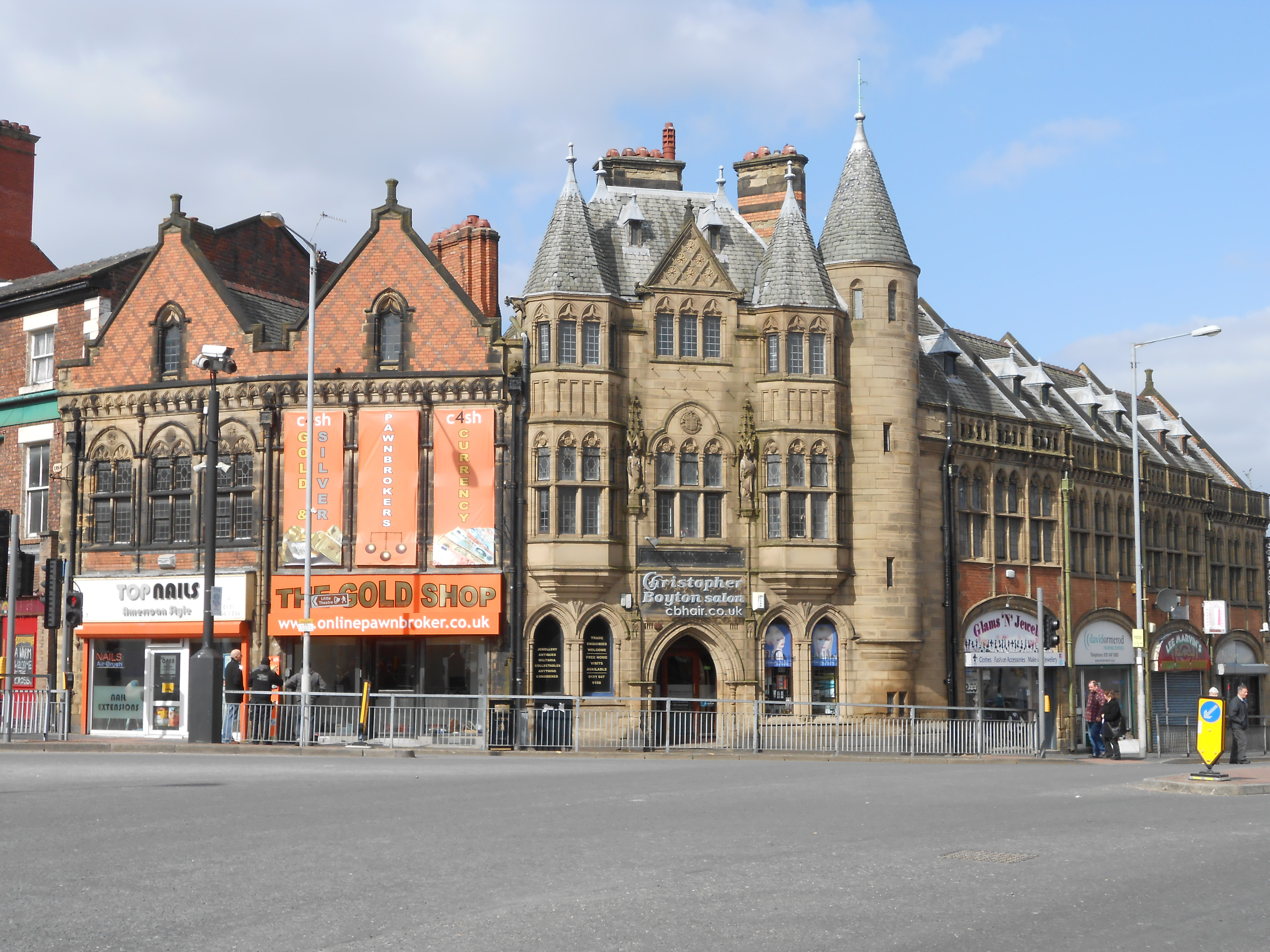
- Bank Buildings

- Location in Merseyside
- 53.3892°N 3.0308°W
- Location: 1–7 Charing Cross, Birkenhead, Wirral, Merseyside, England
- OS grid reference: SJ 315,885

History
- Built: 1901
- Built for: Bank of Liverpool

Site notes
- Architect: Douglas and Minshull
- Architectural style: Gothic Revival

Listed Building – Grade II
- Designated: 28 March 1974
- Reference no.: 1292250

Bank Buildings is a historical construction on a corner site at 1–7 Charing Cross, Birkenhead, Wirral, Merseyside, England. It consists of offices and shops which extend towards the north along Exmouth Street and towards the west along Grange Road West. It is recorded in the National Heritage List for England as a designated Grade II listed building.

== History ==
The building was constructed in 1901 for the Bank of Liverpool. The part of the building on the corner was occupied by the bank and this was flanked by shops on both sides. It was designed by the Chester architects Douglas and Minshull, and the corner building was later occupied by Martins Bank. By the early 2000s the corner building was being used for offices and a shop, and the rest of the building continues to be occupied by other shops.

== Architecture ==
Bank Buildings is Gothic in style. It is constructed mainly in ashlar stone with some brickwork, and with roofs of Westmorland green slate. The former bank building stands on the corner of the streets and is symmetrical in three storeys with three bays. The central bay has an arched doorway with a three-light mullioned and transomed window in the middle storey. The top storey contains a three-light mullioned window, over which is a gable. In the middle storey on each side of the window is a niche with a crocketted spire containing a statue. The lateral bays have a two-light arched window on the ground floor. Above these rises a two-story canted turret carried on corbels. In each storey are four-light windows, similar in type to those in the central bay. At the top of each is a conical roof with a finial. At the summit of this section of the building is a hipped roof containing two small dormers. To the right of the section is a circular stair tower rising higher than the turrets, with stair windows, and three lancet windows under a conical roof with a finial.

To the right of the central section, along Exmouth Street, is a row of four shops, stepped downhill, that are all similar to each other. They have two storeys, the lower storey being in brick with stone dressings, and the upper storey in stone. The lower storey has a modern shop front under an elliptical arch. The upper storey contains three pairs of two-light mullioned and transomed windows. Along the top of the front is a balustraded parapet on corbels. The roof is steeply pitched and has two small dormers. To the left of the central section along Grange Road West are two two-storey shops, similar to each other, with modern shop fronts on the ground floor under elliptical arches. In the upper storey of each are three pairs of two-light mullioned and transomed windows. Above these is a gable containing a single-light window and brick diapering over which is stone coping. Inside the corner section is an octagonal hall, formerly the banking hall. The citation in the National Heritage List for England describes the building as "a varied and lively treatment of an important corner site".

== See also ==
- Listed buildings in Birkenhead
- List of non-ecclesiastical and non-residential works by John Douglas
