= Billy Hobby's Well =

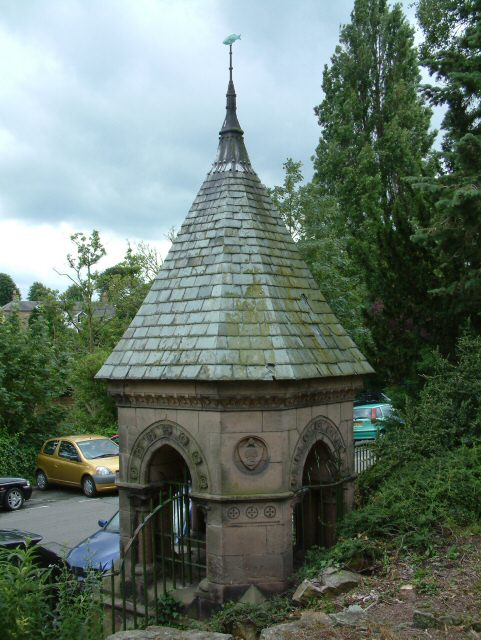
- Billy Hobby's Well

- Location in Cheshire
- 53.1897°N 2.8803°W
- Location: Grosvenor Park, Chester, Cheshire, England
- OS grid reference: SJ 4128 6620

History
- Built for: Richard Grosvenor, 2nd Marquess of Westminster

Site notes
- Architect: John Douglas

Listed Building – Grade II
- Designated: 10 January 1972
- Reference no.: 1375825

Billy Hobby's Well is in Grosvenor Park, Chester, Cheshire, England. Its canopy is recorded in the National Heritage List for England as a designated Grade II listed building.

== History ==
Grosvenor Park was developed on land given to the city of Chester by Richard Grosvenor, 2nd Marquess of Westminster in the 1860s. The land consisted of fields on the north side of the River Dee overlooking the river. The largest of these fields was known as Billy Obbies' Field. This field contained a spring or well that was believed to have magical powers; maidens stood with their right leg in the water and wished for husbands. As part of the development of the park, the Marquess commissioned the Chester architect John Douglas to design a number of features for the park, including a canopy for the well. The structure is now used as a pump house for the water garden in the park.

== Architecture ==
The canopy is built in red and buff sandstone ashlar. It stands on a square plinth and has canted corners. Each face has a pointed arch flanked by a granite column containing wrought iron bars. The voussoirs of the arches include carved roses. On each corner is a small carved circle containing carved sheafs and portcullises. The roof consists of a tiled spire, and at its apex is a lead finial surmounted by a copper fish which acts as a weather vane.

== See also ==
- Grade II listed buildings in Chester (east)
- List of non-ecclesiastical and non-residential works by John Douglas
