= Grosvenor Club and North and South Wales Bank =

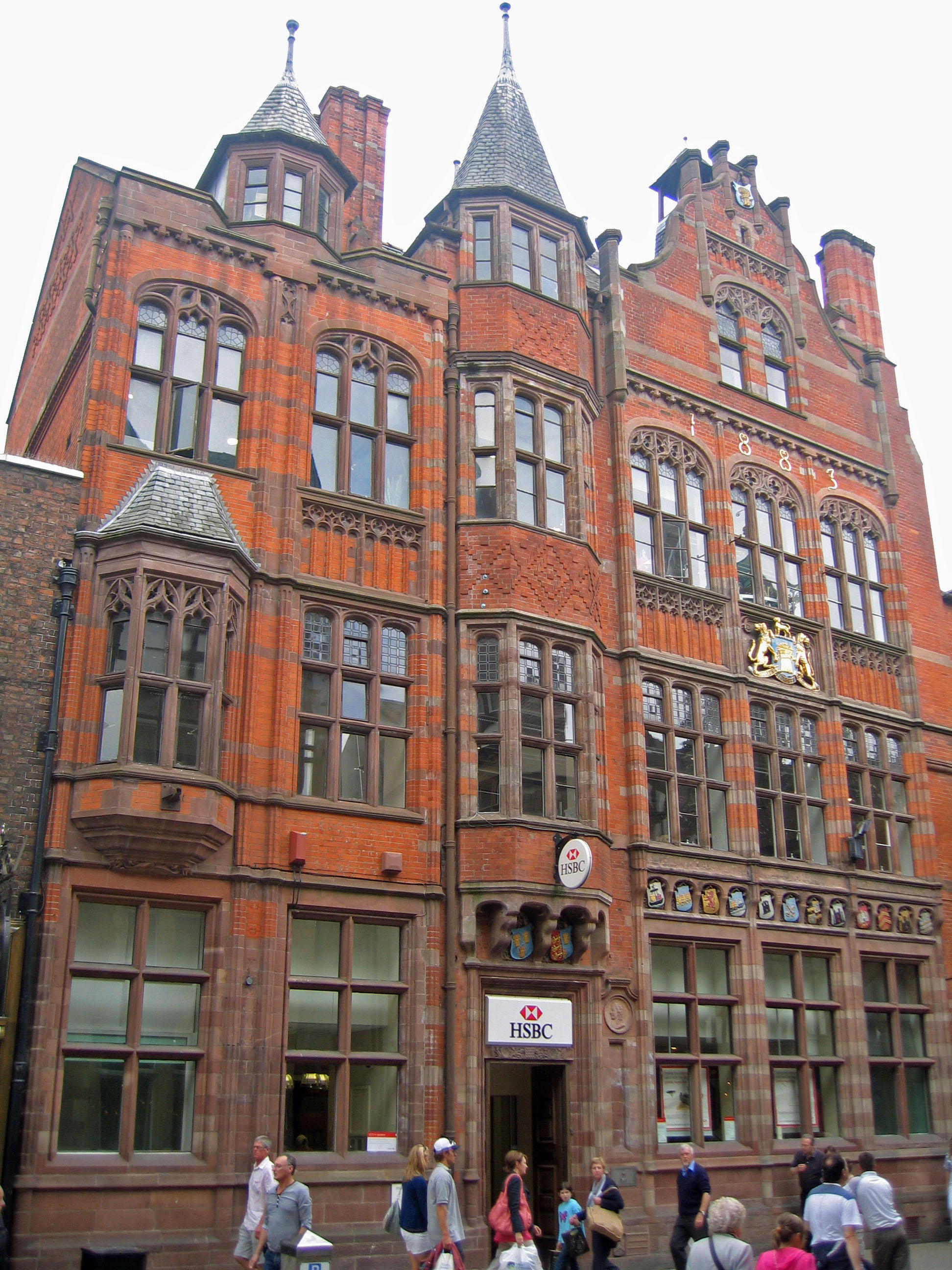
- Grosvenor Club and North and South Wales Bank, now the HBSC bank

- Location in Cheshire
- 53.1909°N 2.8889°W
- Location: 47–57 Eastgate Street, Chester, Cheshire, England
- OS grid reference: SJ 407 664

History
- Built: 1881–1883; 143 years ago Extended 1908

Site notes
- Architect(s): Douglas and Fordham; Douglas and Minshull

Listed Building – Grade II
- Designated: 10 January 1972
- Reference no.: 1376242

The Grosvenor Club and North and South Wales Bank is a building at 47–57 Eastgate Street, Chester, Cheshire, England. It is recorded in the National Heritage List for England as a designated Grade II listed building, and continues to be used as a bank.

== History ==
The building was constructed as a combined gentlemen's club and branch of The North and South Wales Bank between 1881 and 1883. It is sited adjacent to the Eastgate, and was designed by the local architects Douglas and Fordham. In 1908 the building was enlarged by the same firm, then known as Douglas and Minshull. It is no longer used as a gentlemen's club but is still a bank.

== Architecture ==
The bank has three storeys, plus attics. The lowest storey is constructed in red sandstone and the upper storeys in brick with stone dressings; it has a roof of Westmorland green slate. In the lintel over the doorway in the entrance bay is a carving of the portcullis from the Grosvenor coat of arms. Above the door is a three-storey canted oriel window carried on corbels; between the corbels are two more coats of arms. The windows are all mullioned, those in the middle storey also having two transoms, and that in the upper storey has a transom. Between the windows is brick diapering. At the summit of this bay is a spire with a lead finial. To the left of the entrance bay is a wing containing two mullioned and transomed windows in each storey; the left-hand window in the middle storey is a canted oriel window. Centrally at the summit is another spire with a lead finial. To the right of the entrance bay are three mullioned and transomed windows in each storey, plus a two-light window in the gable. Between the lower and middle-storey windows is a frieze containing shields with the arms of the twelve former shires of Wales. Centrally between the middle and top-storey windows is the Grosvenor coat of arms. Above the top-storey windows is the gilded date "1883". Over the window in the attic is the sheaf from the Grosvenor arms. The gable is elaborately shaped with four finials, and behind it is a belfry with a pyramidal roof and a finial. Two shaped chimneys rise from the roof.

== See also ==
- Grade II listed buildings in Chester (central)
- List of non-ecclesiastical and non-residential works by John Douglas
