= St Werburgh Chambers, Chester =

St Werburgh Chambers
- St Werburgh Chambers in 2001

- Location in Cheshire
- 53.1912°N 2.8907°W
- Location: St Werburgh Street, Chester, Cheshire, England

History
- Built: 1872–73
- Built for: G. Hodgkinson

Site notes
- Architect: John Douglas

Listed Building – Grade II
- Designated: 10 January 1972
- Reference no.: 1376393

St Werburgh Chambers consists of a pair of shops in St Werburgh Street, Chester, Cheshire, England, on the south side of the street facing Chester Cathedral. It is recorded in the National Heritage List for England as a designated Grade II listed building.

== History ==
In 1872 the local architect John Douglas submitted a plan to the Improvement Committee of Chester City Council to develop the site. The building was constructed in 1872–73 as offices for Douglas' client G. Hodgkinson, and was numbered 29–33 St Werburgh Street. The building is now used as shops and is numbered 29–31.

== Architecture ==
The building has three bays. The left bay (at the east of the building, numbered 29) has three storeys and a gable. The other two bays have two storeys, and the bay on the right (at the east, originally numbered 33) also has a gable, smaller than that of the left bay. In the ground floor of the left bay is a modern shop front. In the middle storey is a casement window over which is an oriel window. The gable contains hanging tiles in bands. The shop front on the ground floor of the left bay extends into the middle bay. Over this is a casement window. The right bay has a separate modern shop front in the ground floor. The upper storey is timber-framed and it contains another casement window. The gable contains a row of quatrefoil panels over the window, and above this are curved braces.

== See also ==
- Grade II listed buildings in Chester (central)
- List of non-ecclesiastical and non-residential works by John Douglas
