= Edward Hubbard (architectural historian) =

British architectural historian

Edward Horton Hubbard (2 July 1937 – 31 May 1989) was an English architectural historian who worked with Nikolaus Pevsner in compiling volumes of the Buildings of England. He also wrote the definitive biography of John Douglas, and played a part in the preservation of Albert Dock in Liverpool.

== Biography ==
Edward Hubbard was born in Birkenhead in 1937 and studied architecture at Liverpool University where he discovered that his vocation was for the history of architecture rather than for its practice. When the Victorian Society was founded in 1958, Hubbard became an early member and in 1965 he established its first regional group in Liverpool, acting as its honorary secretary for 13 years. When the group was launched the first speaker was Nikolaus Pevsner, and Hubbard was to work with him for the next 20 years in helping to compile the series of the Buildings of England, and later the Buildings of Wales. He did the preparatory work for the South Lancashire volume, was joint author of the Cheshire volume, and helped to prepare the Staffordshire volume. He wrote the Clwyd volume for the Buildings of Wales which was published in 1986. When they were preparing the Cheshire volume, Hubbard drove Pevsner around the county. In the introduction to the book, Pevsner says of Hubbard, "...his even temper and his psychological treatment of my moments of despondency were invaluable".

In 1976 Hubbard was elected as a Fellow of the Society of Antiquaries. In 1980, with Michael Shippobottom, he organised an exhibition at the Royal Academy on Lord Leverhulme, which led to the joint publication in 1988 of A Guide to Port Sunlight Village. Hubbard was concerned with conservation, in particular with the upgrading of the listing of Albert Dock in Liverpool from Grade II to Grade I, which resulted in its preservation as a commercial and tourist attraction.

In his work with Pevsner, Hubbard had become an admirer of the works of John Douglas. When he enrolled with the University of Manchester for an MA degree, Douglas was the subject of his thesis. This proved to be a substantial work of scholarship and Hubbard hoped it would be published. However he developed ankylosing spondylitis which led to an increasing degree of disability, and he died in 1989. The work was edited by Peter Howell and published posthumously by the Victorian Society in 1991 as The Work of John Douglas. Hubbard is commemorated in a stained glass memorial window in Westminster Abbey, commissioned by his father.

== Bibliography ==
- Pevsner, Nikolaus; Hubbard, Edward (2003) [1971], Cheshire, The Buildings of England, New Haven and London: Yale University Press, ISBN 0-300-09588-0
- Hubbard, Edward (1986), Clwyd, The Buildings of Wales, London: Penguin, ISBN 0-14-071052-3
- Hubbard, Edward (1991), The Work of John Douglas, London: The Victorian Society, ISBN 0-901657-16-6
- Hartwell, Clare; Hyde, Matthew; Hubbard, Edward; Pevsner, Nikolaus (2011) [1971], Cheshire, The Buildings of England, New Haven and London: Yale University Press, ISBN 978-0-300-17043-6
