= Eccleston Hill Lodge =

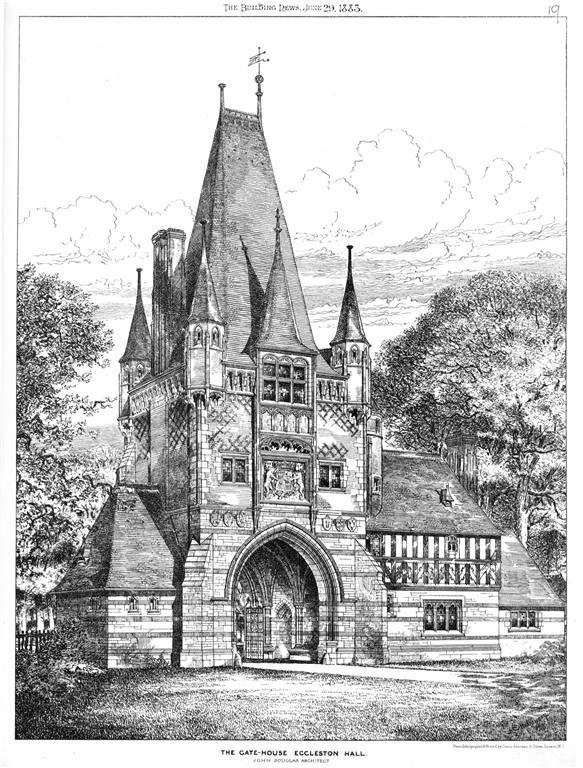
- Drawing of Eccleston Hill Lodge in 1883

- Location in Cheshire
- 53.153676°N 2.885204°W
- Location: Eccleston, Cheshire, England
- OS grid reference: SJ 409 622

History
- Built: 1881
- Built for: Hugh Grosvenor, 1st Duke of Westminster

Site notes
- Architect: John Douglas
- Architectural style: Gothic Revival

Listed Building – Grade II*
- Designated: 2 November 1983
- Reference no.: 1136352

Eccleston Hill Lodge is a gateway and lodge near the village of Eccleston, Cheshire, England. It stands at the entrance of the Chester Approach to the estate of Eaton Hall. The structure is recorded in the National Heritage List for England as a designated Grade II* listed building.

== History and critique ==
The building was designed by John Douglas for the 1st Duke of Westminster in 1881. The authors of the Buildings of England series describe it as "marvellous". Douglas' biographer, Edward Hubbard, refers to its "ducal grandeur". The description in the National Heritage List for England concludes by describing it as "a bravura gatehouse, impressive for its grand scale, picturesque massing and rich detailing".

== Architecture ==
The gatehouse has three storeys and "a hipped roof so high and so steep as to be virtually a spire". The lowest storey is in banded stone, the upper two storeys are in red brick with diapering in blue brick and stone dressings, and the roofs have red tiles. An arched gateway forms the bottom storey and contains an ornate wrought iron gate. Under the archway is ribbed vaulting. Centrally over the gateway is a stone panel containing armorial carvings. Above this are transomed and mullioned windows and at the top is a spirelet (small spire). One each side of the panel are smaller windows. From each corner of the gateway arises a tourelle (a turret on a projecting corbel). In addition on the right is a circular stair turret with a conical roof. To the right of the gatehouse is a two-storey wing, the lower storey in banded stone and upper storey timber-framed. To the left is a small single-storey wing, also in banded stone.

Internally there is an oak spiral staircase and oak doors. The large room above the gateway contains a fireplace in Tudor style.

== See also ==
- Grade II* listed buildings in Cheshire West and Chester
- Listed buildings in Eccleston, Cheshire
- List of houses and associated buildings by John Douglas
