= All Saints Church, Higher Kinnerton =

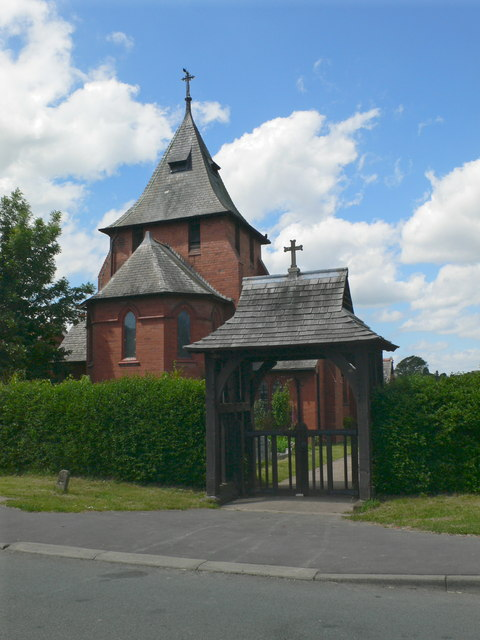
- All Saints Church, Higher Kinnerton
- All Saints Church, Higher Kinnerton
- 53.1439°N 3.0044°W
- OS grid reference: SJ 329 611
- Location: Main Road, Higher Kinnerton, Flintshire
- Country: Wales
- Denomination: Anglican

History
- Status: Parish church

Architecture
- Functional status: Active
- Architect: Douglas and Fordham
- Architectural type: Church
- Completed: 1893

Specifications
- Materials: Ruabon brick

Administration
- Province: York
- Diocese: Chester
- Archdeaconry: Chester
- Deanery: Chester
- Parish: Dodleston

All Saints Church is in Main Road, Higher Kinnerton, Flintshire, Wales. It is an active Anglican parish church in the Diocese of Chester, the archdeaconry of Chester, and the deanery of Chester.

The church was designed by Douglas and Fordham and built in 1893. It is constructed in Ruabon brick. In addition to a central spire, the chancel is carried up into another pyramidal spire.

Construction on an extension to the church building was started in 2007. This has been completed, providing the church with on-site facilities including a small kitchen.

== Organ ==
The church organ was built by Hardy of Stockport, with tonal design by Robert Hope-Jones. It is believed to be the first organ designed by Hope-Jones. The organ initially featured a Tuba Mirabilis, which is an unusual feature for an organ of this small size. The Tuba Mirabilis stop was removed in the 1980s and replaced with an Oboe stop. An unusual feature of Hope-Jones' planned organ design was a Great to Swell 2nd Touch coupler, and a knob for this exists on the console, though it appears to have never been connected.

== See also ==
- List of new churches by John Douglas
