= St Mary's School, Eccleston =

Eccleston C-of-E Primary School
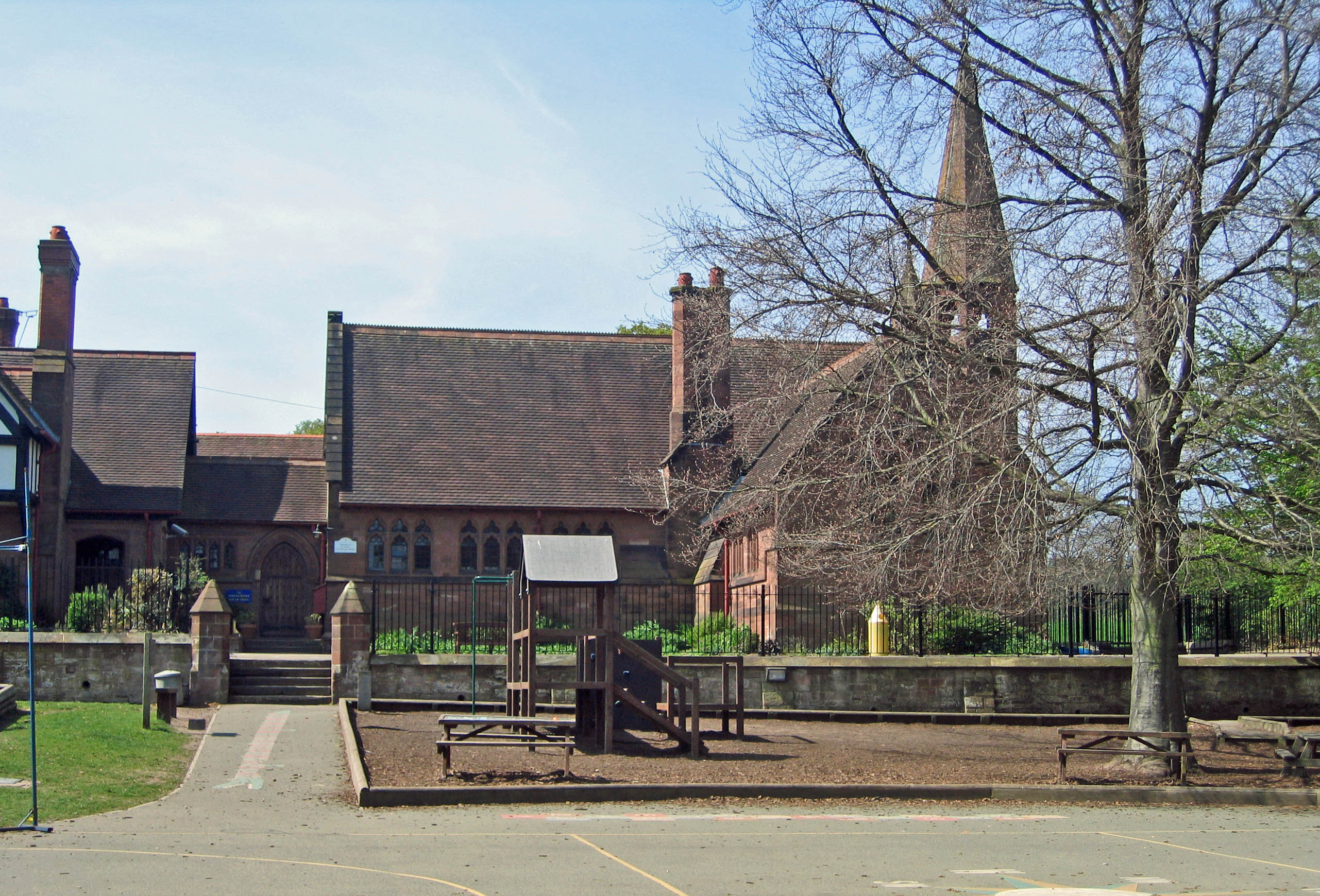
- Eccleston School in 2011

Location
- Coordinates: 53.1575°N 2.8821°W

Information
- Type: Voluntary aided school
- Religious affiliation: Church of England
- Local authority: Cheshire West and Chester
- Department for Education URN: 111349 Tables
- Ofsted: Reports
- Headteacher: Katie Wilkes
- Gender: Coeducational
- Age: 4 to 11
- Website: http://www.ecclestonprimary.cheshire.sch.uk/

St Mary's School, Eccleston
- Interactive map of St Mary's School, Eccleston
- Location: Eaton Road, Eccleston, Cheshire, England
- Built: 1878
- Built for: 1st Duke of Westminster
- Architect: John Douglas

Listed Building – Grade II*
- Designated: 2 November 1983
- Reference no.: 1138415

St Mary's School is on the west side of Eaton Road in the village of Eccleston, Cheshire, England. It is recorded in the National Heritage List for England as a designated Grade II* listed building, and is still in use today, now known as Eccleston C-of-E Primary School.

== History ==
The school was built in 1878 for the 1st Duke of Westminster and designed by the Chester architect John Douglas. It continues to be in use as a Church of England primary school.

== Architecture ==
The architectural style is described by Douglas' biographer, Edward Hubbard, as being Gothic, although in the citation in The National Heritage List for England it is described as being as Tudor. It is constructed in red sandstone with a red tile roof and its plan is a 'T'-shape. The school is attached to the former schoolmaster's house, also designed by Douglas, and also a Grade II* listed building. Attached to the other end of the school is an octagonal turret with a belfry and a steeple. The gables have stone coping and shaped finials. At the apex of the front gable is a niche containing the statue of a figure wearing a crown, teaching a child. The windows are mullioned; some of them are arched, while others are straight-headed. There are two arched doorways; the doors have elaborate wrought iron hinges.

== Critique ==
Douglas designed schools for other estate villages, including Aldford, Dodleston and Waverton. Like Eccleston School, Waverton School is built in close proximity to the schoolmaster's house. In each case the buildings are contrasted, the house being partly half-timbered while the school is constructed entirely in stone. Hubbard considers that these two schools "are outstanding among Douglas' village schools, and though both are attractive, Eccleston is the more delightful of the two". Similarly the authors of the Buildings of England series express the opinion that Eccleston is the best of Douglas' estate schools.

== See also ==
- Grade II* listed buildings in Cheshire West and Chester
- Listed buildings in Eccleston, Cheshire
- List of non-ecclesiastical and non-residential works by John Douglas
