= Marlston-cum-Lache =

Former civil parish in Cheshire, England

Coordinates: 53.161°N 2.912°W

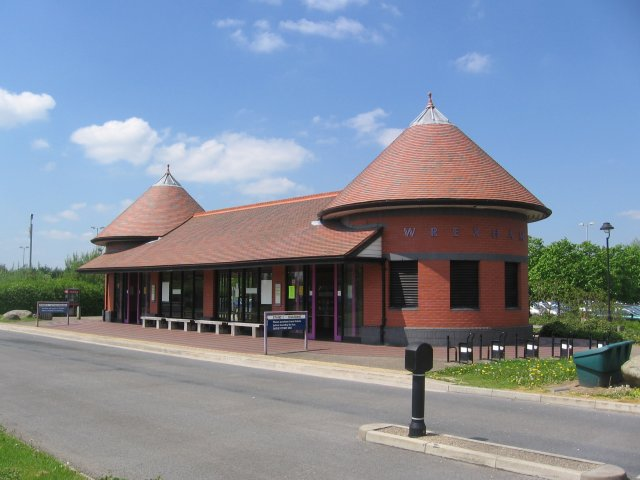
- Wrexham Road Park and Ride

- Location within Cheshire
- Population: 155 (2011)
- OS grid reference: SJ391630
- Civil parish: Dodleston; Eaton and Eccleston
- Unitary authority: Cheshire West and Chester
- Ceremonial county: Cheshire
- Region: North West
- Country: England
- Sovereign state: United Kingdom
- Post town: CHESTER
- Postcode district: CH4
- Dialling code: 01244
- Police: Cheshire
- Fire: Cheshire
- Ambulance: North West
- UK Parliament: Chester South and Eddisbury

Marlston-cum-Lache is a former civil parish, now in the parishes of Dodleston and Eaton and Eccleston, in the Cheshire West and Chester district and ceremonial county of Cheshire in England. In 2001 it had a population of 112, increasing to 166 at the 2011 Census. Marlston cum Lache is served by the A483 road which is the main road to Chester. Marlston-cum-Leach was formerly a township in the parish of St Mary-on-the-Hill, in 1866 Marlston cum Lache became a separate civil parish, on 1 April 2015 the parish was abolished and merged with Dodleston, part also went to form "Eaton and Eccleston".

"Cum" in its name is Latin for "with".

== See also ==
- Listed buildings in Marlston-cum-Lache
