= Balderton Cheese Factory =

- Location in Cheshire
- 53.1540°N 2.9397°W
- Location: Balderton, Cheshire, England
- OS grid reference: SJ 3726 6228

History
- Built: 1874–75
- Built for: 1st Duke of Westminster

Site notes
- Architect: John Douglas

Listed Building – Grade II
- Designated: 2 December 1991
- Reference no.: 1115836

Balderton Cheese Factory is a building in the village of Balderton, Cheshire, England. It is recorded in the National Heritage List for England as a designated Grade II listed building.

== History ==
This was a factory for the manufacture of cheese built in 1874–75 for the 1st Duke of Westminster in a village on his Eaton Hall estate. It was designed by the Chester architect John Douglas. A small number of cheese factories were built on Cheshire estates during the 19th century and the cheese was then carried to industrial towns on special trains. This building is no longer used for cheese manufacture. A similar factory was the Aldford Cheese Factory in Bruera, also designed by Douglas for the Duke, and built about the same time.

== Architecture ==
The building is constructed in red brick with timber framing in its attic storey, and a slate roof. Its main part has four bays and behind it are additional wings. The left bay formed the office of the factory and it projects forward. It contains a five-light casement window, over which is a jettied gable containing a three-light window. The next bay is recessed and contains a Tudor arched doorway with a window to its right. Above this are timber-framed panels, but no gable. The third bay projects forward; it has two three-light windows, the upper one is in a timber-framed gable that is smaller than the gable in the left bay. The fourth bay is recessed with two three-light windows at the lower level. Above these are two two-light windows set in dormers. A chimney rises from the roof of the left bay and behind the right bay is a large boiler-house chimney.

== See also ==
- Listed buildings in Dodleston
- List of non-ecclesiastical and non-residential works by John Douglas
