= Listed buildings in Eccleston, Cheshire =

Eccleston is a former civil parish, now in the parishes of Eaton and Eccleston and Dodleston, in Cheshire West and Chester, England. It contains 46 buildings that are recorded in the National Heritage List for England as designated listed buildings. One of these is listed at Grade I, the highest grade, four at the middle grade, Grade II*, and the rest at the lowest grade, Grade II. The parish is contained within the estate of Eaton Hall, and many of the listed buildings were built for members of the Grosvenor family, in particular the 1st Duke of Westminster, who provided many commissions for the Chester architect John Douglas.

== Key ==
Grade	Criteria
I	Buildings of exceptional interest, sometimes considered to be internationally important
II*	Particularly important buildings of more than special interest
II	Buildings of national importance and special interest

== Buildings ==
Name and location	Photograph	Date	Notes	Grade
Manor House; 53.1583°N 2.8783°W		1632	The original part of the manor house is built in sandstone with a slate. Later a wing was added to the east in stone, brick and pebbledash. The windows are mullioned and mullioned-and-transomed. Other features include finials and an oriel window.	II
Rectory and coach house 53.1569°N 2.8790°W		17th century	This originated as a house with an attached cottage; it was extended in each of the following three centuries. It is a long house in two storeys, in painted brick with gabled slate roofs. Its windows are casements. At the rear is a separate former coach house with a hayloft. It has an L-shaped plan, is in brick, and also has two storeys.	II
Churchyard gates and walls, St Mary's Church; 53.15701°N 2.87927°W		c. 1722	The churchyard gates and overthrow were made by Robert and John Davies of Croes Foel. The square sandstone rusticated gate piers are surmounted by urns; they were moved here from Emral Hall in Flintshire, and the sandstone wing walls were added probably in 1957.	II
Riverside House; 53.1571°N 2.8777°W		Early to mid-18th century	The house is built in stone with a slate roof in 2½ storeys. It has a double gable at each end, and a central gable with an open pediment. The windows are sashes. The doorway has an architrave, a frieze, and a triangular pediment on consoles.	II
Belgrave Farm Farmhouse; 53.1459°N 2.9143°W	—	18th century (probable)	The farmhouse was much altered in about 1820. It is in brick with slate roofs, and has a T-shaped plan. There is a projecting porch, with three bays on each side. The windows are casements.	II
House and cottage, Paddock Road; 53.1561°N 2.8804°W		Late 18th century (probable)	These were reworked for the 2nd Marquess of Westminster in about the 1830s and are described as "probably the earliest identifiable Eaton estate dwellings in Eccleston village". They form an L-shaped building with two storeys. They are constructed in sandstone with slate roofs. The brick chimneys have spirally moulded flues on stone plinths, and the windows are casements.	II
The Cottage; 53.1574°N 2.8809°W		c. 1800	A symmetrical pebbledashed house with a hipped slate roof. It has two storeys, and is in three bays, with a projecting castellated porch. The window openings are Tudor-arched with casements, some original, some replaced. On the south side are French windows.	II
Ruins of old St Mary's Church; 53.15849°N 2.87885°W		1809–13	The church was designed by William Porden, and was demolished in 1900. The remains consist of part of the south wall, a buttress, and a fragment of the west wall; they have been retained as a "picturesque feature" in the churchyard of the new church. The wall is in sandstone, and is about 60 feet (18 m) long and 18 feet (5 m) high.	II
Churchyard walls and gates 53.15805°N 2.87901°W		Early 19th century	The walls and gates are at the end of Church Lane and lead into the old churchyard. The wall are in sandstone, and the gates, in timber, were probably added in the late 19th century, and were probably designed by John Douglas. The gateposts are also in sandstone, and are square with projecting plinths and moulded caps. There are two gates; one for carriages, and one for pedestrians.	II
Hill Farm Farmhouse; 53.1532°N 2.8888°W	—	1843	Built for the 2nd Marquess of Westminster, the farmhouse is in sandstone with slate roofs. It has two storeys, and contains casement windows. The gables have sandstone parapets.	II
Farm building, Hill Farm; 53.1528°N 2.8889°W	—	1843	A two-storey farm building in brick with a slate roof. The lower storey is a shippon, the upper storey a hay loft. There are doorways in both storeys, and diamond-shaped ventilators in the upper storey.	II
Outbuilding to the Kennel; 53.14322°N 2.92094°W	—	Mid-19th century	Part of the kennels for Eaton Hall. It is a single-storey brick building with a gabled slate roof, and cast iron windows.	II
Coachman's House and coach house 53.15696°N 2.87772°W		1865	This is a cottage in the grounds of Riverside House. It is in sandstone with a slate roof, and has two storeys. The windows are sashes. Over the doorway is a shield with the Grosvenor sheaf and the date. The cottage is attached to a double coach house with a brick outbuilding. The coach house has two carriage doorways and casement windows.	II
Bee House; 53.15658°N 2.87901°W	—	1870	This is located in the garden of the rectory. It is a small brick building with a T-shaped plan, and has a tiled roof with finials. Its gables are timber-framed. In the walls are slits and entrances for the bees, and a door.	II
Church House; 53.1571°N 2.8800°W		1870	A house designed by John Douglas for the 3rd Marquess of Westminster. It is in brick with stone dressings and timber-framed gables, and has a steep tiled roof. The house has 1½ storeys, and is in two bays. The windows are mullioned.	II
Institute; 53.1579°N 2.8791°W		1870	The building was probably designed by John Douglas for the 3rd Marquess of Westminster, and was later converted into an office. It is rectangular with 1½ storeys, and is constructed in brick on a sandstone plinth, with timber-framed gables, one of which is jettied. The roof is tiled. The lower storey windows are mullioned. Above the entrance is a timber-framed dormer containing a casement window.	II
Deer Park Cottage; 53.1502°N 2.8786°W		1873	A house designed by John Douglas for the 3rd Marquess of Westminster. It is asymmetrical, with timber framed walls on a sandstone plinth and tiled roofs. The house is in 1½ storeys, and has tile-hung gables with shaped bargeboards. Other features include mullioned and transomed windows, an oriel window, and floral pargetting.	II
Shelter; 53.15655°N 2.88031°W		1874	This was designed as a pump-house by John Douglas for the 1st Duke of Westminster. It is an octagonal timber-framed structure on a sandstone plinth. The roof is a truncated pyramid with a ventilator under a spirelet with a finial carrying a gilded fish.	II
Belgrave Cottages; 53.1435°N 2.9206°W	—	1870s	A pair of estate cottages for the 1st Duke of Westminster, probably designed by John Douglas. They are in brick with red tiled roofs, they are symmetrical, and have 1½ storeys. At the front is a shared dormer, flanked by projecting gables containing pargetted panels with floral designs. The mullioned windows contain casements. At the rear of the cottages is a group of single-storey, brick outbuildings, with timber-framed gables and tiled roofs.	II
Church Villas; 53.1571°N 2.8799°W		1875	A pair of cottages designed by John Douglas for the 1st Duke of Westminster. They are asymmetrical in 1½ storeys, each with a different design. The cottages are built in brown brick with banding and patterns in blue brick. The roofs are tiled, and have shaped ridge tiles and finials. One cottage has a gable with a dormer, the other has a partly timber-framed half-gable. The windows are mullioned. At the rear is a long brick outbuilding.	II
Morris Oak Cottages; 53.1531°N 2.8785°W		1875–78	These are two houses designed by John Douglas as accommodation for servants of the 1st Duke of Westminster. They are in brick with stone dressings and a tiled roof, and form a U-shaped plan. They have 1½ storeys, and are in a free Jacobean style. On the south side are two dormers flanked by gables, all with pinnacles. The windows are mullioned and contain casements.	II
Garden walls, gateposts and gates 53.15720°N 2.87829°W		Late 19th century	The walls along Church Road are in sandstone, with square monolithic gate piers.	II
Smithy; 53.15612°N 2.88234°W		Late 19th century	The smithy was built for the 1st Duke of Westminster. It is a plain rectangular sandstone building in a single storey, with a gabled slate roof. The windows are mullioned.	II
Wrexham Road Farm; 53.1614°N 2.9026°W		1877–85	A model farm designed by John Douglas for the 1st Duke of Westminster, consisting of a farmhouse (dated 1880) and farm buildings forming three sides of a quadrangle. They are in brick with half-timbered gables. The farmhouse is symmetrical, in 2½ storeys, with shaped gables. The farm buildings include shippons, haylofts, a barn, a cartshed, stables, and a dovecote with a turret.	II
St Mary's School; 53.1575°N 2.8821°W		1878	The school was designed by John Douglas and paid for by the 1st Duke of Westminster. It is built in sandstone with a red tiled roof, and has a T-shaped plan. At the north end is an octagonal steeple, and on the roof of the hall is a louvred ventilator. The front gable contains a canopied niche with a statue of a crowned figure teaching a child.	II*
Schoolmaster's house 53.15734°N 2.88205°W		1878	This was designed by John Douglas for the 1st Duke of Westminster, and is attached to the school. It is an asymmetrical house mainly in sandstone, with some timber-framing in the upper storey, and some tile-hanging. The windows are mullioned and contain casements. A single-storey stone and brick outbuilding to the rear is included in the listing.	II*
Wall and steps, St Mary's School; 53.15742°N 2.88185°W		1878	Designed by John Douglas for the 1st Duke of Westminster, this consists of a red buttressed sandstone wall at the edge of the terrace in front of the school and schoolmaster's house. There are octagonal piers on the sides of the steps.	II
Police House; 53.15665°N 2.88066°W		c. 1880	A house for the 1st Duke of Westminster, probably designed by John Douglas. It is rectangular, has two storeys, and is in Jacobean style. The house is constructed in sandstone with a green Westmorland slate roof. The windows are casements.	II
Eccleston Hill; 53.1546°N 2.8845°W	—	1881–82	A large house in Jacobean style designed by John Douglas for the secretary of the 1st Duke of Westminster. It was altered and extended in 1892–94 by Douglas and Fordham. It is in red brick, with blue brick diapering, stone dressings, and a complex red tiled roof. The house has two storeys and attics, and has shaped brick chimneys. On the north side is a timber-framed porch. The windows are mullioned with casements. Attached to the house are a timber conservatory with an octagonal lantern, and a single-storey stable wing.	II
Eccleston Hill Lodge; 53.1537°N 2.8852°W		1881–82	The lodge was designed by John Douglas for the 1st Duke of Westminster. It is in three storeys, the lowest being in banded stone, and the upper two storeys in diapered brick. The roofs are tiled. The bottom storey consists of an arched gateway with an ornate wrought iron gate. Above this are transomed and mullioned windows, corner tourelles, and a steep hipped roof. To the right of the gatehouse is a two-storey wing.	II*
Sun Houses; 53.1565°N 2.8836°W		1882	A pair of asymmetrical cottages designed by John Douglas for the 1st Duke of Westminster. They have two storeys, the lower storey being in brick with stone dressings, and the upper storey partly pebbledashed and partly tile-hung. The roofs are tiled. Some of the gables contain ornamental pargeting. The windows are mullioned.	II
Eccleston Paddocks; 53.1552°N 2.8811°W		1882–83	A house designed by John Douglas for Cecil Parker, the land agent of the 1st Duke of Westminster. It has 2½ storeys and a basement, the lower storey being in striped stone, and the upper storey in blue diapered red brick. Above this are dormers and gables, and steeply pitched red tiled roofs. At the east corners are circular turrets with conical roofs. The original service block was largely demolished in 1960.	II*
Gatehouse and estate office, Eccleston Paddocks; 53.1554°N 2.8815°W	—	1883	These were designed by John Douglas for the 1st Duke of Westminster. They are in red brick with blue brick diapering, stone dressings and red tiled roofs. The gatehouse is in two storeys and has a pyramidal roof over the gateway, and a turret with a conical roof surmounted by lead finials and a weathercock. The office has a single storey, and is in an L-shaped plan.	II
Stables and coach house, Eccleston Paddocks; 53.1553°N 2.8818°W	—	1883	These were designed by John Douglas for the 1st Duke of Westminster. They consist of a two-storey west wing, and a single-storey south wing. Constructed in red brick with stone dressings, they have red tiled roofs. On the ridge of the west wing is a louvred ventilator with a spire. The mullioned windows contain casements.	II
1–4 Hill Road; 53.1568°N 2.8815°W		c. 1889	Four attached cottages forming a U-shaped plan designed by Douglas and Fordham. They are in red-brown brick with blue brick diapering, stone dressings, and red tiled roofs, and have 1½ storeys. The roofs of the central two cottages form a loggia, and both cottages have shaped dormers. The two outer cottages have shaped gables facing the road. The windows are casements, and the brick chimneys are decoratively moulded. To the rear are wash and coal houses, joined to the cottages by a wall with ornate copings and finials.	II
Eccleston Lodge; 53.1504°N 2.8780°W		1893–94	The lodge is an asymmetrical building in Jacobethan style designed by Douglas and Fordham. The lower storey is in yellow sandstone, the upper storey in diapered red brick. It is roofed in green Westmorland slate. Its features include a timber-framed gable with carved bargeboards, an octagonal turret with a spire and a weathervane, and ornate mullioned windows.	II
Eccleston Lodge gates 53.15055°N 2.87789°W		1894	These consist of a pair of carriage gates, pedestrian gates, gate piers, and wing railings, all in wrought and cast iron. The railings stand on sandstone plinths.	II
Mill Hill House; 53.1550°N 2.8939°W	—	1894	The house was designed by Douglas and Fordham for the 1st Duke of Westminster. It is in red brick with blue brick diapering, sandstone dressings, and has a grey slate roof with red terracotta ridge tiles. The house is symmetrical with two storeys, and in three bays. There is a central porch with a shaped gable, shaped chimneys with spiral-moulded flues, three shaped half-dormers, and mullioned windows containing casements.	II
Post Office and houses 53.1567°N 2.8804°W		1890s	These consist of two houses incorporating a sub-post office, designed by Douglas and Fordham for the 1st Duke of Westminster in Vernacular Revival style. They are in brick with stone dressings, and have green Westmorland slate roofs. The building is in two storeys, and has two half-octagon bay windows with hipped roofs. Other features include four shaped brick chimneys, a half-timbered porch, and casement windows.	II
Smithy Farm; 53.1563°N 2.8823°W		1896	The originated as a farmhouse, and was largely rebuilt by Douglas and Fordham for the 1st Duke of Westminster. The original walls were sandstone and these have been partly recased in red brick with blue brick diapering. The roof is slated. The house has two storeys, and a three-bay front with a projecting timber-framed porch on a sandstone plinth. The window surrounds are mullioned, and the windows are casements. The end-gables are rendered and contain lancet windows.	II
The Kennels; 53.1430°N 2.9214°W	—	1896	The house has an L-shaped plan, is in two storeys (the upper storey being slightly jettied), and has three bays. It is built in red brick, with blue brick diapering, grey slate roofs, and red tile ridges. It has shaped gables with red terracotta copings. The window surrounds are mullioned, and the windows are casements. The chimneys have spirally moulded flues.	II
Old Rectory; 53.1590°N 2.8804°W		c. 1896	A large house designed by T. M. Lockwood and Sons for the 1st Duke of Westminster. It is in red brick with blue brick diapering, stone dressings, and a slate roof with ball finials. The windows are mullioned and transomed, and contain casements. The doorcase is in Doric style. Inside the dining room is an ornate chimney piece.	II
St Mary's Church; 53.1576°N 2.8794°W		1899	The church was designed by G. F. Bodley and paid for by the 1st Duke of Westminster. It replaced a church of 1809 by William Porden, which replaced a medieval church on the same site. It is constructed in sandstone with lead roofs, and consists of a continuous nave and chancel, with aisles, a north vestry, a south porch, and a west tower. Inside the church are monuments to members of the Grosvenor family.	I
Tomb of Edward George Hugh, Earl Grosvenor; 53.15834°N 2.87892°W		1909	Edward George Hugh, Earl Grosvenor, died at the age of four. The tomb is a bronze enclosure with an openwork surround designed by Detmar Blow and Fernand Billerey. It has panels decorated with various emblems, and at the head are statues of King Edward I, Saint George, and Saint Hugh.	II
Telephone kiosk 53.15611°N 2.88378°W		1935	A K6 type telephone kiosk, designed by Giles Gilbert Scott. Constructed in cast iron with a square plan and a dome, it has three unperforated crowns in the top panels.	II

== See also ==
- Grade II listed buildings in Chester (south)
- Listed buildings in Eaton
- Listed buildings in Dodleston
- Listed buildings in Marlston-cum-Lache
- Listed buildings in Poulton
- Listed buildings in Pulford
- Listed buildings in Aldford
- Listed buildings in Saighton
- Listed buildings in Huntington
