= Listed buildings in Lower Kinnerton =

Lower Kinnerton is a former civil parish, now in the parish of Dodleston, in Cheshire West and Chester, England. It contains six buildings that are recorded in the National Heritage List for England as designated listed buildings, all of which are at Grade II. This grade is the lowest of the three gradings given to listed buildings and is applied to "buildings of national importance and special interest". Apart from the village of Lower Kinnerton, the parish is entirely rural. Other than the former school and schoolmaster's house, all the listed buildings are related to farming.

Name and location	Photograph	Date	Notes
Bridge Farm Farmhouse; 53.1516°N 2.9872°W		1685	The farmhouse is built in brick with stone dressings and a slate roof. It has an E-shaped plan, is in two storeys, and has a five-bay front. There are three large Dutch gables on the entrance front, and another on the north face. The windows are casements. At the rear of the house is a semi-hexagonal bay window and a timber-framed porch. Attached to the rear is an 18th-century brick shippon, which is included in the listing.
Old School House; 53.1532°N 2.9736°W		1836	This originated as a schoolmaster's house and schoolroom. It is built in brick with a hipped slate roof, and has three storeys with a symmetrical front. There is a projecting gabled porch with a Tudor arched opening. The windows are casements.
Farm building, Moor End Farm; 53.1510°N 2.9709°W		Late 19th century	The farm building comprises a shippon and a cartshed. It is built in brick with sandstone dressings, and has a red tiled roof. It has an almost square plan, is symmetrical, and has a central jettied timber-framed gable. Above the cartshed is a hayloft with a loading bay. The windows are casements.
Broadhey Farm Farmhouse; 53.1525°N 2.9822°W		1893	The farmhouse was designed by Douglas and Fordham for the 1st Duke of Westminster. It is built in brown brick with blue brick diapering, a grey slate roof, and red ridge tiles. The house is asymmetrical, in two storeys, and has two gables and a dormer on the front. The gables have terracotta coping and ball finials. There are two brick chimneys with spiral flues. The windows are casements.
Broadhey farm buildings 53.1526°N 2.9819°W		1893	The farm buildings were designed by Douglas and Fordham for the 1st Duke of Westminster, and include shippons. They are built in brown brick with blue brick diapering, a grey slate roof, and red ridge tiles. The gables are timber-framed.
Gell Farm Farmhouse; 53.1528°N 2.9793°W		1894	The farmhouse was designed by Douglas and Fordham for the 1st Duke of Westminster. It is built in brown brick with red brick dressings, a grey slate roof, and red ridge tiles. The house is in two storeys, and has an asymmetrical three-bay front with two shaped gables. The gables have terracotta coping and ball finials. There are two ornate brick chimneys. The mullioned windows contain casements.

== See also ==
- Listed buildings in Dodleston
- Listed buildings in Poulton
- Listed buildings in Pulford
