= Monument to Hugh, Earl Grosvenor =

Coordinates: 53.15833°N 2.87898°W

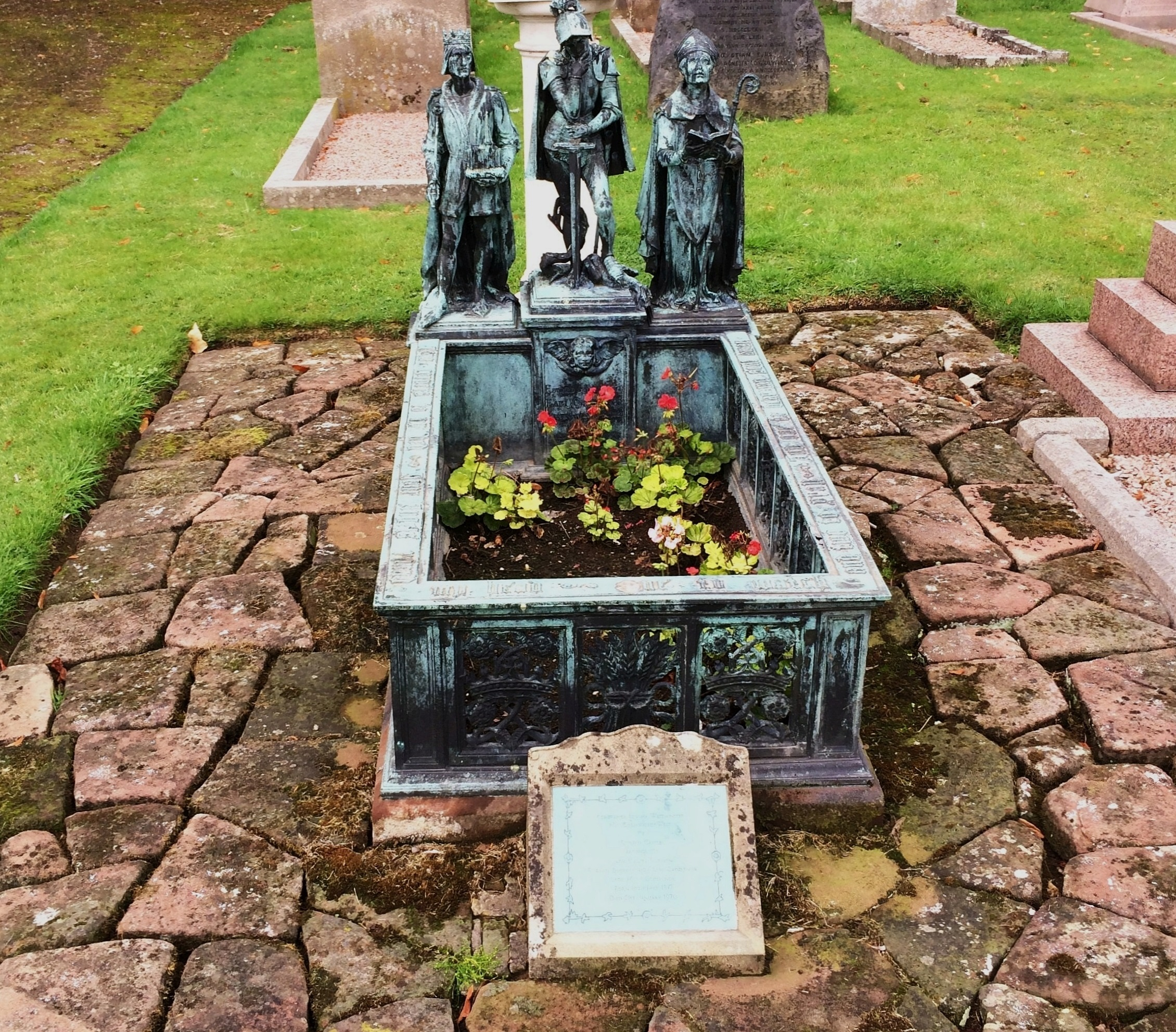
Tomb of Edward George Hugh, Earl Grosvenor

The Monument to Hugh, Earl Grosvenor, is in the graveyard of St Mary's Church, Eccleston, Cheshire, England. It commemorates the brief life of the only son of Hugh Grosvenor, 2nd Duke of Westminster, who died at the age of four. The monument consists of an enclosure in bronze around his grave, and incorporates three bronze figures. It was designed by Detmar Blow, possibly assisted by Fernand Billerey, and the sculptor was Emile Madeline. The monument is recorded in the National Heritage List for England as a designated Grade II listed building.

== History ==
Edward George Hugh Grosvenor, Earl Grosvenor (16 November 1904 – 13 February 1909) was the only son of the 2nd Duke of Westminster, and died following an operation for appendicitis. The Duke commissioned Detmar Blow to design a memorial to his son, and Blow's French partner Fernand Billerey may have also been involved in the design. The sculptor was Emile Madeline, and the memorial was completed in 1910.

== Description ==
The memorial consists of an enclosure of bronze railings and panels on a sandstone base, which stretch on four sides around the Earl's grave, with three bronze figures at the head of the grave. The railings are 141 centimetres (4.6 ft) long, 76 centimetres (2.5 ft) wide, and 34 centimetres (1.1 ft) high. The figures are respectively 69 centimetres (2.3 ft), 65 centimetres (2.1 ft), and 60 centimetres (2.0 ft) high. The panels are decorated with heraldic symbols of the Grosvenor family, and include portcullises, wheat sheaves, coronets, and roses. Along the top of the railings, and going round all four sides, is an inscription reading:

Four corners to my bed
Four angels round my head
One to watch and two to pray
And one to bear my soul away (Note: This is taken from a bedtime prayer for children.)

The tombstone is inscribed:

Edward George Hugh
Earl Grosvenor
Born on the Eve of St Hugh
1904
died February 13th
1909

At the head of the tomb are three bronze figures, each bearing one of the Earl's given names; Edward I with a model of a church, Saint George with a sword and with his foot on a dragon's neck, and Saint Hugh with a book, and wearing bishop's robes and a mitre. On the headstone is the carved head of an angel.

== Appraisal ==
The memorial was designated as a Grade II listed building on 2 November 1983. Grade II is the lowest of the three grades of listing and is applied to "buildings of national importance and special interest". The citation in the National Heritage List for England describes it as "a tomb of admirable workmanship". Both Hartman et al. in the Buildings of England series, and Morris and Roberts in the Public Sculpture of England series consider that the design is in the tradition of Alfred Gilbert and suggests his influence.

== See also ==
- Listed buildings in Eccleston, Cheshire

== Notes and references ==
Notes

Citations

Sources

- Hartwell, Clare; Hyde, Matthew; Hubbard, Edward; Pevsner, Nikolaus (2011) [1971], Cheshire, The Buildings of England, New Haven and London: Yale University Press, ISBN 978-0-300-17043-6
- Morris, Edward; Roberts, Emma (2012), Public Sculpture of Cheshire and Merseyside (excluding Liverpool), Public Sculpture of Britain, vol. 15, Liverpool: Liverpool University Press, ISBN 978-1-84631-492-6
- Historic England, "Tomb of Edward George Hugh, Earl Grosvenor, Eccleston (1330222)", National Heritage List for England
- Historic England, Listed Buildings
