= Wrexham Road Farm, Eccleston =

Wrexham Road Farm
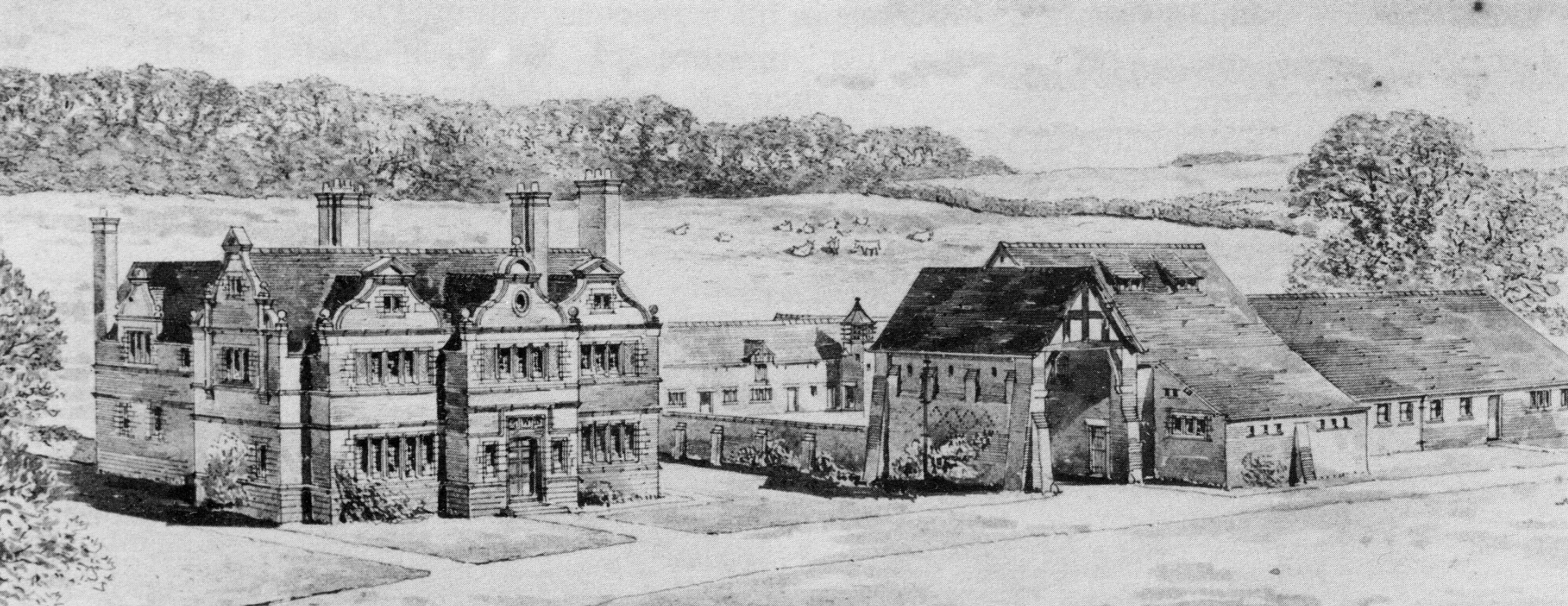
- Wrexham Road Farm in 1888

- Location in Cheshire
- 53.1614°N 2.9026°W
- Location: Eccleston, Cheshire, England
- OS grid reference: SJ 398 631

History
- Built: 1877–84
- Built for: 1st Duke of Westminster

Site notes
- Architect: John Douglas

Listed Building – Grade II
- Designated: 28 August 1973
- Reference no.: 1138382

Wrexham Road Farm was a farmhouse and farm buildings lying to the east of Wrexham Road, Eccleston, Cheshire, England. It is recorded in the National Heritage List for England as a designated Grade II listed building, and it is now located within Chester Business Park.

== History ==
The farm was built between 1877 and 1884 as a model farm. It was designed by the Chester architect John Douglas for the 1st Duke of Westminster on his Eaton Hall estate. The farmhouse is dated 1880. Douglas had carried out work on the Duke's other farms but this was his first complete farmstead, with the house and the buildings being designed together as a whole. The farm buildings include a barn, shippons, stables, carthouses, piggeries and a dovecote. The buildings are no longer used as a farm and have been converted into offices as part of the Chester Business Park.

== Architecture ==
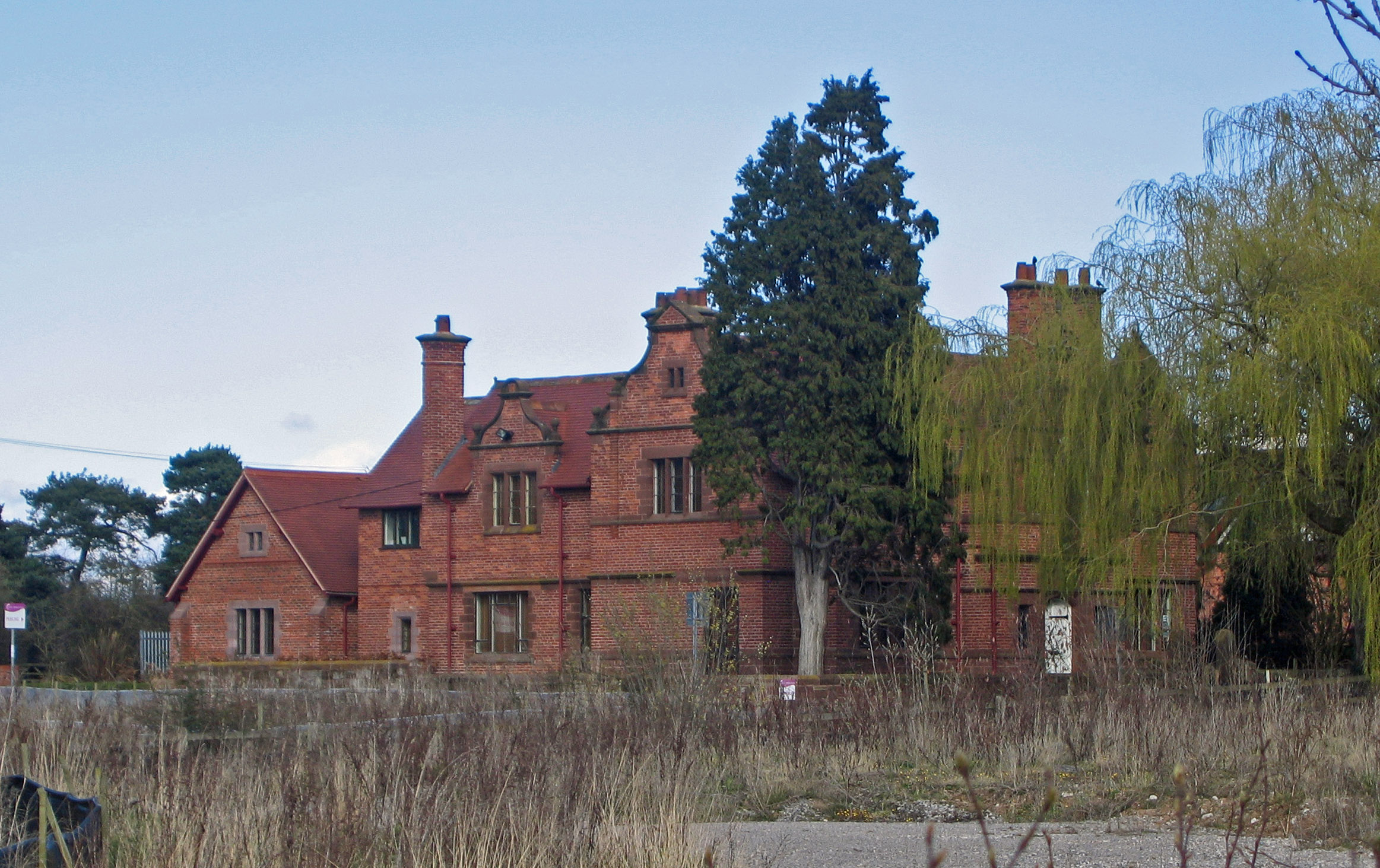
Wrexham Road Farmhouse in 2010

The farmhouse is built in brick with stone dressings and has two storeys plus attics. The entrance front faces south and has three bays. The central bay projects forwards and includes a doorway with a single-light window on each side. The other bays, on the ground floor, and all bays in the upper storey, have five-light mullioned windows. All three bays are surmounted by Dutch gables with ball finials. The gables in the lateral bays each contain a small two-light window; the central bay has an oval window. The west face of the farmhouse also has two Dutch gables and stone mullioned windows. The other two faces are plain. A covered passage links the house to the farm buildings. Together with the farmhouse, the farm buildings form a quadrangle. The buildings are in one and two storeys, built in brick, and have steep roofs. The entrance arch has a half-timbered upper storey. In the northeast corner of the farmyard is a dovecote surmounted by a spire. In 1888 Douglas submitted his design for this building and for Saighton Lane Farm at the Royal Academy. The authors of the Buildings of England express the opinion that this is "one of the most agreeable of all Douglas' model farms".

== See also ==
- Listed buildings in Eccleston, Cheshire
- List of non-ecclesiastical and non-residential works by John Douglas
