= Church Cottage, Eccleston =

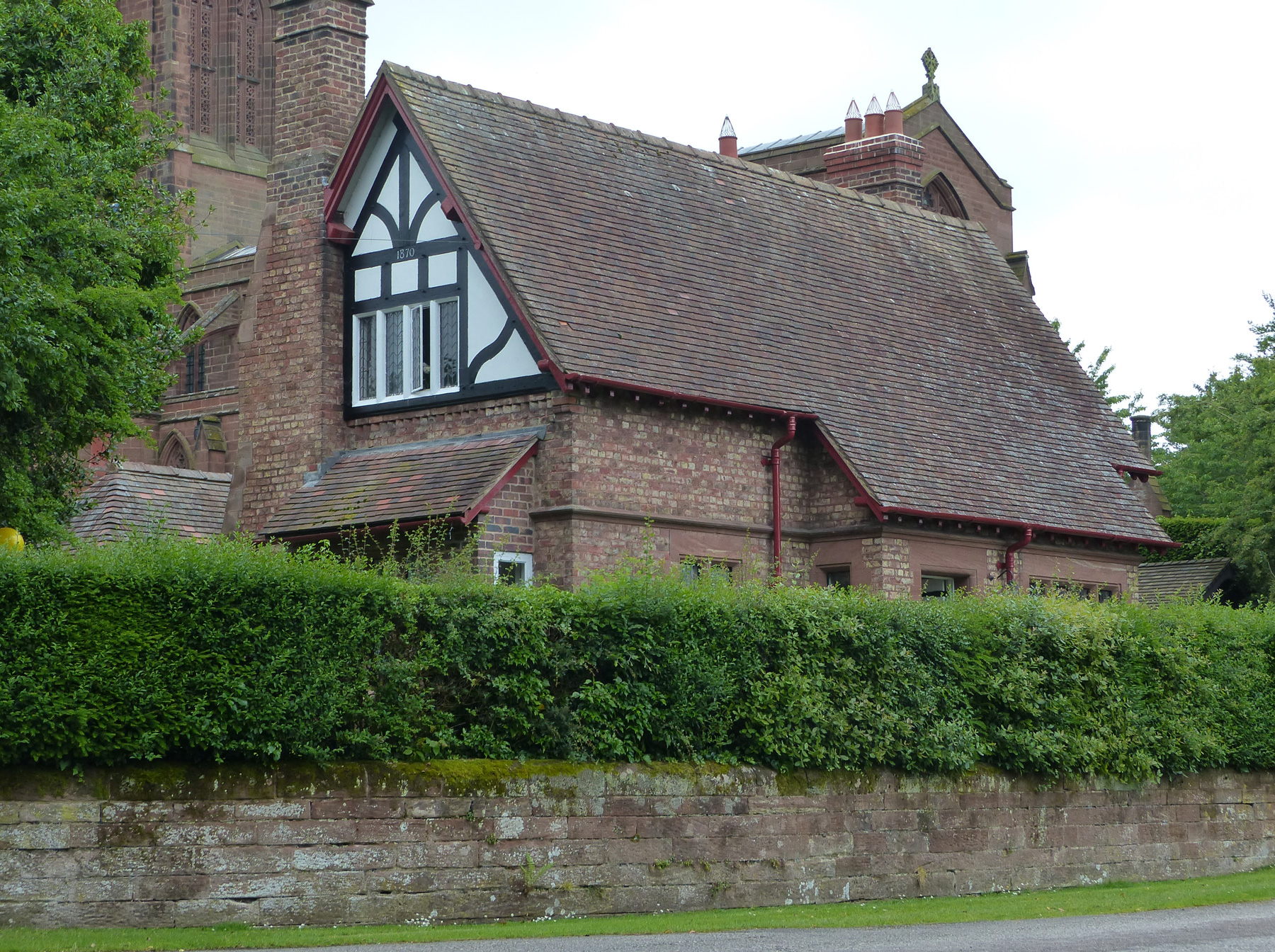

- Location in Cheshire
- 53.1574°N 2.8788°W
- Location: Eccleston, Cheshire, England
- OS grid reference: SJ 413 626

History
- Built: 1870
- Built for: 3rd Marquess of Westminster

Site notes
- Architect: John Douglas

Listed Building – Grade II
- Designated: 2 November 1983
- Reference no.: 1136369

Church Cottage stands in the corner of the churchyard of St Mary's Church in the village of Eccleston, Cheshire, England. It is recorded in the National Heritage List for England as a designated Grade II listed building.

The cottage was built in 1870 for the 3rd Marquess of Westminster and designed by the Chester architect John Douglas. It is constructed in brown brick with stone dressings and a red tile roof. The roof is steep and has gables at each end; the gables are timber-framed and tile-hung. The cottage has 1½ storeys and two bays. The surviving original windows have stone mullions. The timber-framed gable is described as being "plain and simple" with "an unusually high proportion of white plaster to dark timber".

== See also ==
- Listed buildings in Eccleston, Cheshire
- List of houses and associated buildings by John Douglas
