= Eccleston Paddocks =

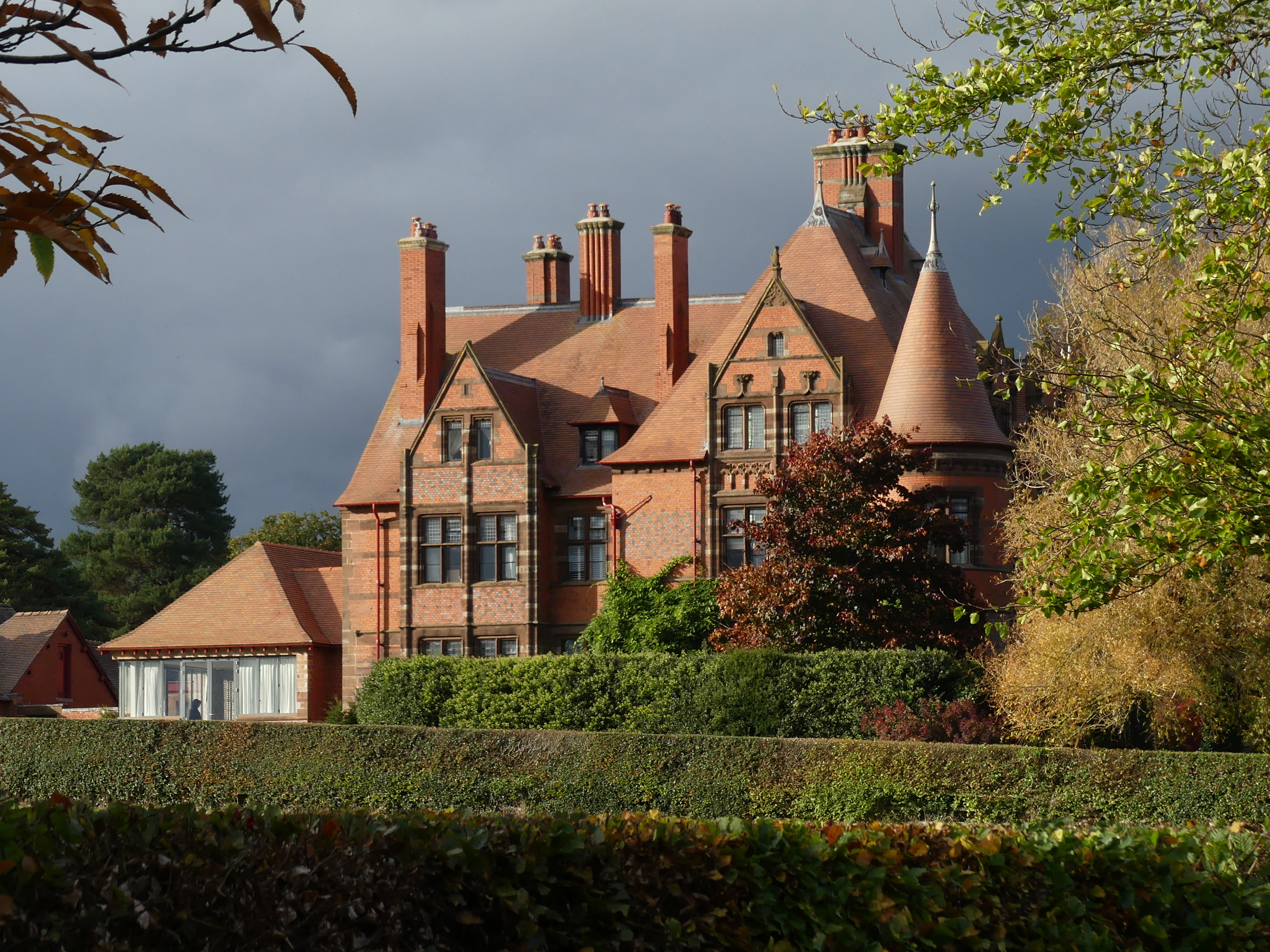
- Eccleston Paddocks in 2025

- Location in Cheshire
- 53.1553°N 2.8811°W
- Location: Eccleston, Cheshire, England

History
- Built for: Cecil Parker

Site notes
- Architect: John Douglas
- Architectural style: Vernacular

Listed Building – Grade II*
- Designated: 28 August 1973
- Reference no.: 1138377

Eccleston Paddocks (or The Paddocks) is a large house in the village of Eccleston, Cheshire, England. It is recorded in the National Heritage List for England as a designated Grade II* listed building. When the French architect Paul Sédille saw it, he exclaimed "C'est un petit château!" That is, "This is a small castle!"

== History ==
Eccleston Paddocks was built in 1883 for Cecil Parker, the nephew and land agent of the 1st Duke of Westminster. It was designed by the Chester architect John Douglas. The full complex consisted of the house, estate offices and stables. The service wing was demolished in 1960.

== Architecture ==
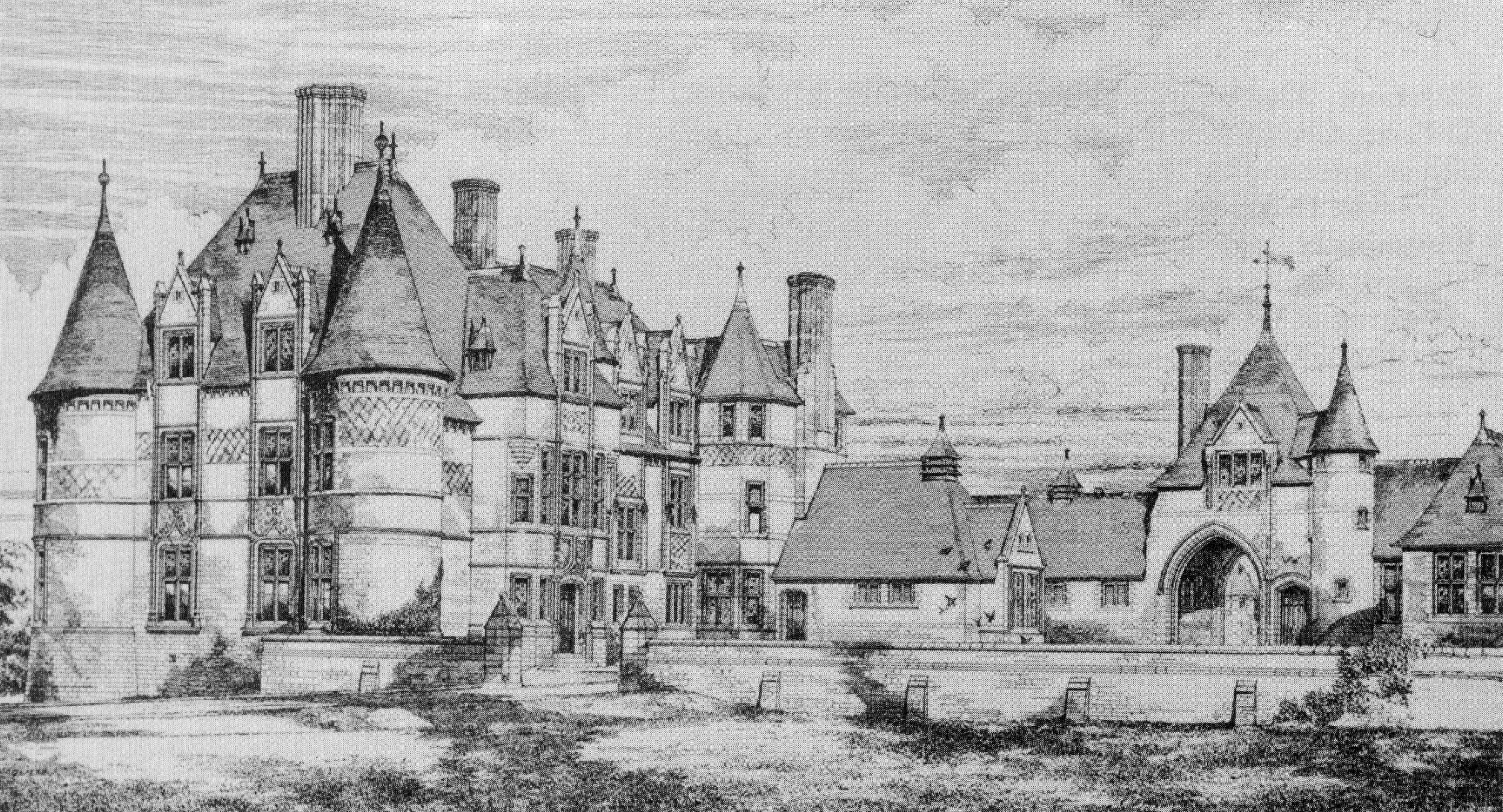
Eccleston Paddocks in 1883; the service wing on the right has since been demolished

The house has 2½ storeys and a basement. The basement and ground floor are in red sandstone, with horizontal bands of lighter stone. The upper part of the house is in red brick with some blue-brick diapering and stone bands; the dressings are in carved stone. The roof is of red tiles, it is steep and hipped and rising from its apex is a massive brick chimney.

The entrance is on the north face. Above the projecting arched doorway is a mullioned and transomed staircase window. Over this a two-light window in a gable, flanked by two small turrets. The entrance bay is surmounted by two hipped roofs on each side of which are dormer windows. To the right of the entrance bay are three more bays, containing a small door, and irregularly placed windows. The left bay is surmounted by a steep conical roof and the other bays by gables containing windows. The truncated service wing is to the right of this. The east front overlooks the garden. On each corner is a large turret with a conical roof, between which are two gabled bays with windows. The south front has two projecting gabled bays. On the top of every gable and roof is a finial. The original service wing included an arched gateway with a pyramid roof and a turret with a conical roof.

== See also ==
- Grade II* listed buildings in Cheshire West and Chester
- Listed buildings in Eccleston, Cheshire
- List of houses and associated buildings by John Douglas
