= Listed buildings in Marlston-cum-Lache =

Marlston-cum-Lache is a former civil parish now in the parishes of Dodleston and Eaton and Eccleston, in Cheshire West and Chester, England. It contains two buildings that are recorded in the National Heritage List for England as listed buildings, both of which are at Grade II. This grade is the lowest of the three gradings given to listed buildings and is applied to "buildings of national importance and special interest". The parish is entirely rural, and both listed buildings are farmhouses.

Name and location	Photograph	Date	Notes
Roughhill; 53.1546°N 2.9265°W	—	Mid-17th century	A farmhouse, much altered in the 19th century. It is built in brick with sandstone dressings and slate roofs. At the front of the house is a projecting gable. The windows are mullioned and transomed, and contain casements.
Two Mile House; 53.1539°N 2.9156°W		Late 17th century	A farmhouse, altered in the 19th century. It is built in brick with sandstone dressings and slate roofs. The original part of the house has 2 1/2 storeys, is symmetrical, and is in three bays. The extension to the right has two storeys, and is in two bays. The windows in the original part are sashes; those in the extension are casements.

== See also ==
- Grade I listed buildings in Cheshire West and Chester
- Grade II* listed buildings in Cheshire West and Chester
- Grade II listed buildings in Chester (south)
- Listed buildings in Dodleston
- Listed buildings in Eaton
- Listed buildings in Eccleston
