= Listed buildings in Dodleston =

Dodleston is a civil parish in Cheshire West and Chester, England. It contains 13 listed buildings that are included in the National Heritage List for England and designated by English Heritage at Grade II. This grade is the lowest of the three gradings given to listed buildings and is applied to "buildings of national importance and special interest". Apart from the village of Dodleston, the parish is rural. The village is part of the Eaton estate of the Grosvenor family. The listed buildings in the parish are mainly domestic or related to farming, and some of them were commissioned by members of the Grosvenor family.

| Name and location | Photograph | Date | Notes |
|---|---|---|---|
| St Mary's Church; 53.1416°N 2.9554°W | | Early 16th century | Other than the lower part of the tower, the church was rebuilt in 1869–70 by John Douglas in the Perpendicular style of the earlier church. It is built in sandstone with slate roofs, and consists of a nave with a north aisle, a chancel, a north vestry and a north timber-framed porch. The tower is in two stages, with a crenellated parapet and a short spire. |
| Greenwalls Farmhouse; 53.1493°N 2.9444°W | — | Late 17th century | The farmhouse is built in brick with slate roofs. An extension and a timber-framed porch were added in the 19th century. The windows are casements. There are two gables with sandstone coping. |
| Farm buildings, Greenwalls Farm; 53.1485°N 2.9452°W | — | Late 18th century (probable) | The farm buildings are in brick with slate roofs, and have an L-shaped plan. They are in two storeys with gables, and contain a shippon, hay lofts, and a cartshed. They contain two broad archways and casement windows. A single storey wing was added later. |
| Dodleston Hall; 53.14675°N 2.95757°W | | 1793 | A farmhouse, later altered, in brick with stone dressings and a gabled slate roof. Over the door is a keystone carved with an ornament and the date. The house stands on a moated site, which is a scheduled monument. |
| Dovecote, Dodleston Hall; 53.14690°N 2.95751°W | | c. 1793 (probable) | The dovecote is a circular brick building, with a two-stage conical slate roof; between the stages is a louvred ventilator. There is an external flight of stone steps leading to a doorway, and a circular flight-hole. Inside are tiers of nesting boxes. |
| Red Lion Inn; 53.1430°N 2.9565°W | | 1840 (or earlier) | The public house is built in pebbledashed brick with slate roofs. It is in three storeys, and a projecting gable on the front. The windows are casements. |
| 5 and 6 The Square; 53.1442°N 2.9575°W | | 1858 | A pair of stone cottages with slate gabled roofs. No. 5 has two gabled half-dormers and casement windows. |
| 1 and 2 The Square; 53.1440°N 2.9572°W | | 1863 | A pair of cottages built for the 2nd Marquess of Westminster. They are constructed in brick with slate gabled roofs, and form an L-shaped plan. The cottages have 1½ storeys, and each cottage is in two bays. The windows include a bay window, half-dormers, and casements. |
| Balderton Dairy; 53.1540°N 2.9397°W | — | 1874–75 | Built as a cheese factory, this was designed by John Douglas for the 1st Duke of Westminster. It is built in brick and timber-framing with slate roofs, and has one storey and an attic. The main block has four bays, and there are additional wings on each side. The first bay in the main block was the office, and has a jettied gable and a five-light mullioned window. |
| Lychgate; St Mary's Church; 53.14191°N 2.95571°W | | Late 19th century | The lychgate and its wing walls were probably designed by John Douglas. The lychgate consists of an oak frame on a sandstone plinth. It has a roof of Westmorland slate with red tiles on the ridge. The walls are also in sandstone. |
| Dodleston Lane Farmhouse; 53.1354°N 2.9495°W | | 1890 | A farmhouse designed by Douglas and Fordham for the 1st Duke of Westminster. It is constructed on red brick with blue brick diapering and stone dressings. Some of the upper parts are timber-framed, and the roof is tiled. The farmhouse has two storeys and attics. It has an open timber-framed porch with a tiled roof. The windows are casements. |
| Principal farm building, Dodleston Lane Farm; 53.1352°N 2.9492°W | — | 1890 | Part of a model farm designed by Douglas and Fordham for the 1st Duke of Westminster. It is constructed in red brick with blue brick diapering, half-timbered gables, and a red tiled roof. The building has a J-shaped plan, and consists of shippons, hay lofts, a barn, and a cartshed. There are vents with complex patterns. |
| 3 and 4 The Square; 53.1440°N 2.9577°W | | 1899 | A pair of cottages built for the 1st Duke of Westminster. They are in red brick with blue brick diapering and red tiled roofs. The two chimneys are separate, and have spiral moulded brickwork. The cottages have 1½ storeys, and each is in 1½ bays. The windows are mullioned, and contain casements. |

== See also ==
- Listed buildings in Chester
- Listed buildings in Eaton
- Listed buildings in Eccleston
- Listed buildings in Lower Kinnerton
- Listed buildings in Marlston-cum-Lache
- Listed buildings in Poulton
- Listed buildings in Pulford
