= Eccleston Hill =

- Location in Cheshire
- 53.1547°N 2.8845°W
- Location: Eccleston, Cheshire, England
- OS grid reference: SJ 409 623

History
- Built: 1881–82
- Built for: 1st Duke of Westminster

Site notes
- Architect: John Douglas
- Restored: 1892–94

Listed Building – Grade II
- Designated: 2 November 1983
- Reference no.: 1330221

Eccleston Hill is a house in the village of Eccleston, Cheshire, England. The house, with its attached conservatory, wall, and service wing, is recorded in the National Heritage List for England as a designated Grade II listed building.

== History ==
The house was designed by the Chester architect John Douglas for the 1st Duke of Westminster. It was built in 1881–82 as the residence for the Duke's secretary, Colonel David Scotland. The house, and in particular the service quarters, were altered by Douglas & Fordham for Scotland's successor, the Honourable Arthur Lawley in 1892–94.
Colonel W.N. Lloyd, (late Royal Horse Artillery) of the Honourable Corps of Gentlemen at Arms was listed as living at Eccleston Hill on the 1911 UK census.

== Architecture ==
Eccleston Hill is "a large house, virtually a mansion". The house has two storeys plus attics. It is built in red brick, with blue brick diapering and stone dressings. The roof is in red tiles; it is hipped with gables and dormers. Tall shaped chimney stacks rise from the roof. The entrance front faces north and includes an oak timber-framed porch. A wall for growing fruit trees extends to the east from the south east corner of the house at the end of which is a timber conservatory with an octagonal lantern. Extending from the northeast corner of the house to the north is a single-storey stable wing. The gable over the entrance to the stable is also timber-framed.

Although there have been alterations to the interior, Douglas' staircase and panelling to the hall remain "as an outstanding example of [his] domestic joinery".

== See also ==
- Listed buildings in Eccleston, Cheshire
- List of houses and associated buildings by John Douglas
