= Higher Kinnerton =

Village and community in Flintshire, Wales

- Village and community
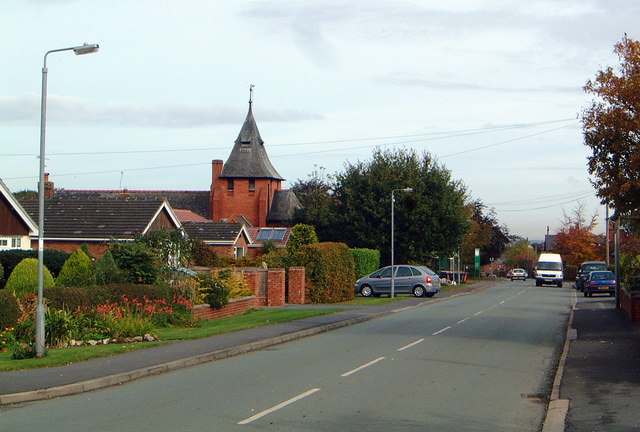
- Main Road

- Location within Flintshire
- Population: 1,697 (2011 census)
- OS grid reference: SJ328613
- Principal area: Flintshire
- Preserved county: Flintshire
- Country: Wales
- Sovereign state: United Kingdom
- Post town: CHESTER
- Postcode district: CH4
- Dialling code: 01244
- Police: North Wales
- Fire: North Wales
- Ambulance: Welsh
- UK Parliament: Alyn and Deeside
- Senedd Cymru – Welsh Parliament: Alyn and Deeside
- Website: higherkinnerton.org.uk
- List of places UK Wales Flintshire 53.14515°N 3.00513°W Map of the community

Higher Kinnerton is a village and community within rural Flintshire, Wales, close to the Wales-England border. Its sister village, Lower Kinnerton, is across the border in Cheshire, England.

In the 2001 census it had a population of 1,634, increasing to 1,697 at the 2011 census.

== Amenities ==
The village has a shop, and two public houses, The Swan and The Royal Oak. The parish church is All Saints, which is actually in the parish of Dodleston, England. There is a Scout group called 1st Kinnerton Scouts. The Village Hall hosts various community clubs and events.

The village was awarded Best Kept Community status by Flintshire County Council in 2012, 2014, 2017 and 2019.

A planning application for 95 homes to the west of the village was refused on 3 March 2021. The land, adjacent to Kinnerton Meadows and several listed buildings, is believed to have historical significance as falling partly within the site of the medieval Llwydcoed Royal Park.

== Education ==
The village has a primary school, Ysgol Derwen. The local secondary schools are Castell Alun, located in Hope and Hawarden High School in Hawarden.

== Governance ==
The area is an electoral ward for Flintshire County Council, coterminous with the community, which elects one county councillor.

== See also ==
- All Saints Church, Higher Kinnerton
- Kinnerton railway station
