= Laurence Broderick =

British sculptor (1935–2024)

Laurence Broderick MRBS, FRSA
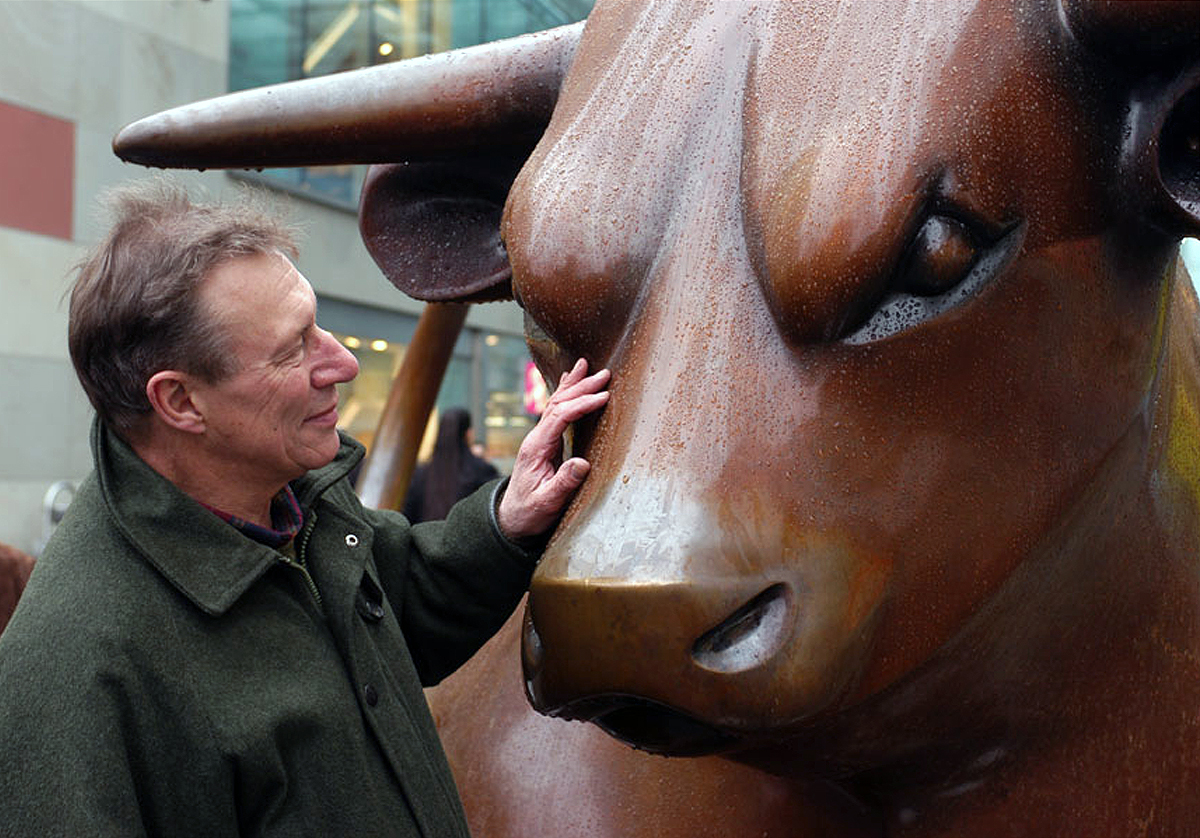
- Broderick with The Bull
- Born: 18 June 1935; Bristol, England
- Died: 18 April 2024 (aged 88); Waresley, Cambridgeshire, England
- Education: Bembridge School; Regent Street Polytechnic; Hammersmith School of Art
- Occupation: Sculptor

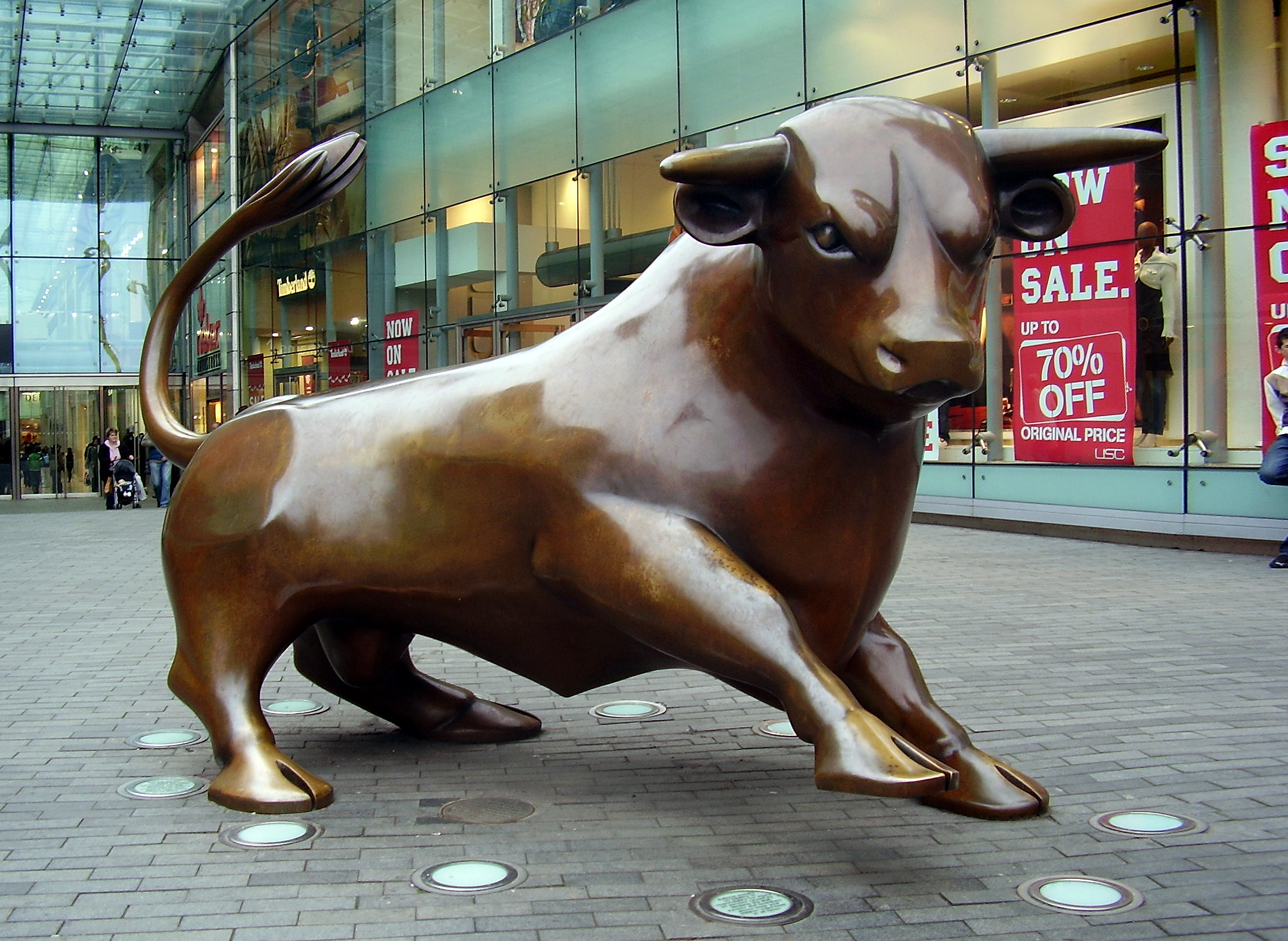
The Bull

Laurence Broderick MRBS FRSA (18 June 1935 – 18 April 2024) was a British sculptor. His best known work is 'The Bull', a public sculpture erected in 2003 at the Bull Ring, Birmingham. The Bull is about 4.5 meters long, about 220 cm high and weighs about 6.5 tons. It is one of the largest bronze animal sculptures in the country. His work consists largely of figurative carvings in stone and editions in bronze.

== Early life ==
Broderick was born in Bristol, in the west of England, on 18 June 1935, and attended Bembridge School on the Isle of Wight. He studied painting, illustration and sculpture under Ray Millard and Geoffrey Deeley at the Regent Street Polytechnic from 1952 to 1957, and with Sidney Harpley and Keith Godwin at the Hammersmith School of Art from 1964 to 1965.

== Career ==
Broderick began his artistic career as an historical and educational illustrator and painter. He taught Art at the Haberdashers' Aske's School in Cricklewood from 1959 and Elstree from 1961, and was Director of Art there from 1965 to 1981. He continued working as a freelance artist and sculptor throughout this period and became a full-time sculptor in 1981.

Predominantly a stone carver, working with many types of stone including: Marble, Alabaster, Soapstone, Hopton Wood Stone and Ancaster Limestone, he also modelled in clay, plasticine, plaster and wax for casting in bronze.

In 1983, he competed as part of the British snow sculpture team during The Quebec Winter Carnival. The team gained second place.

Broderick was a member of the Royal British Society of Sculptors and a fellow of the Royal Society of Arts.

In 1978, Broderick visited the Isle of Skye with his young family where he saw his first wild otter. It was just off the Island of Ornsay, once owned by Gavin Maxwell, the Scottish naturalist and author best known for his work with otters. Skye became Broderick's second home and he held annual sculpture exhibitions on the island for 26 years. For many years he divided his time between his studios on Skye and Waresley near Cambridge, England.

Broderick was joint president of the International Otter Survival Fund, a charity dedicated to the conservation, protection and care of otters in the UK and around the world.

== Death ==
Broderick died on 18 April 2024, at the age of 88.

== Commissions and collections ==
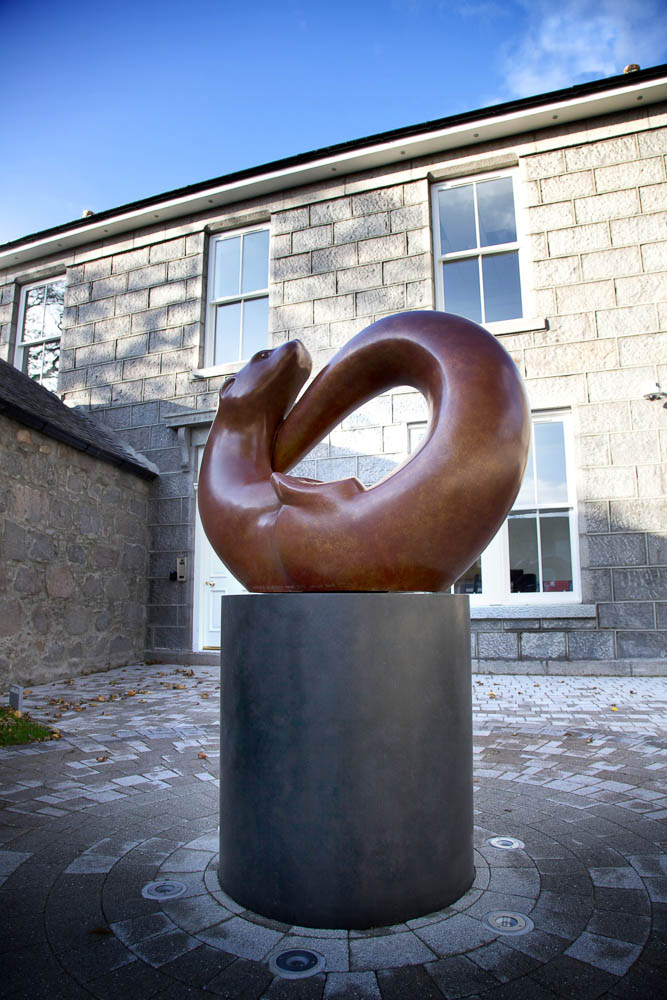
Maxwell Otter at ADC Engineering Aberdeen

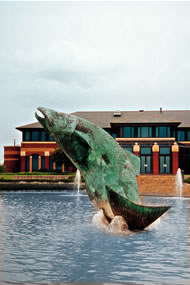
Leaping salmon, Chester Business Park

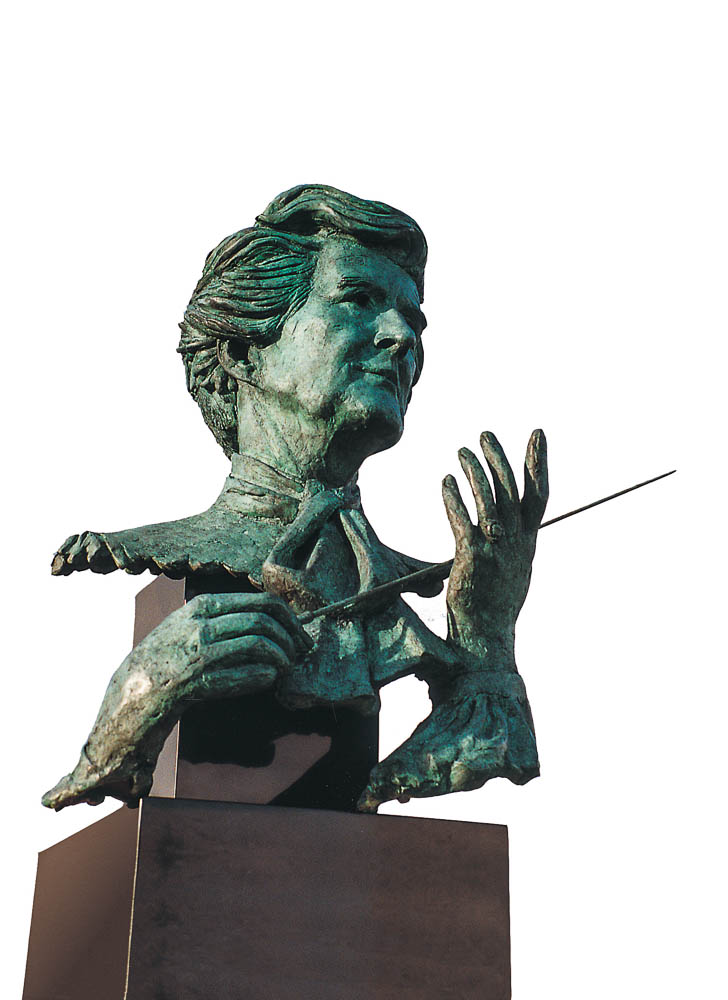
June Gordon, Marchioness of Aberdeen and Temair

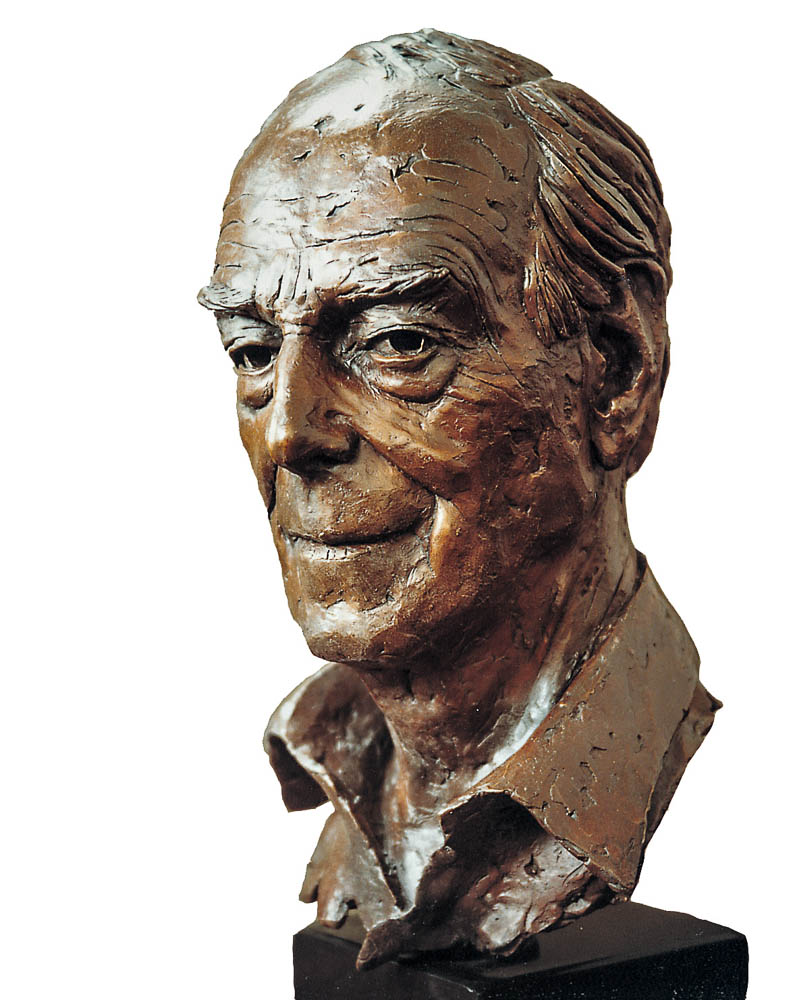
Lord Philimore, bronze portrait

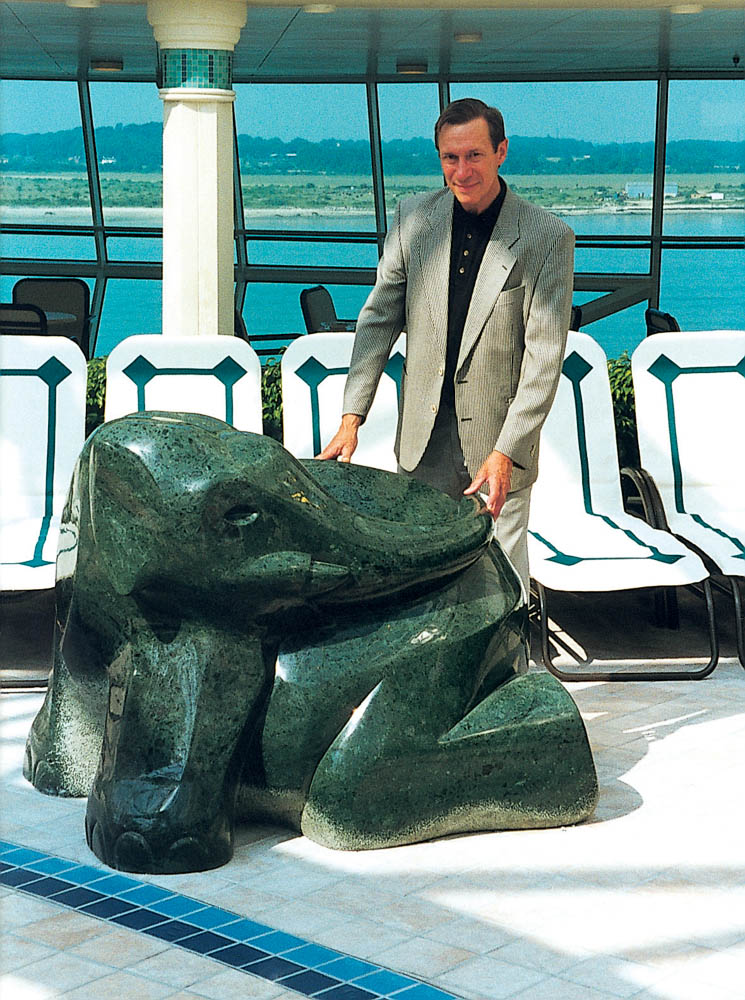
Indian Elephant Calf, Collection Royal Caribbean International

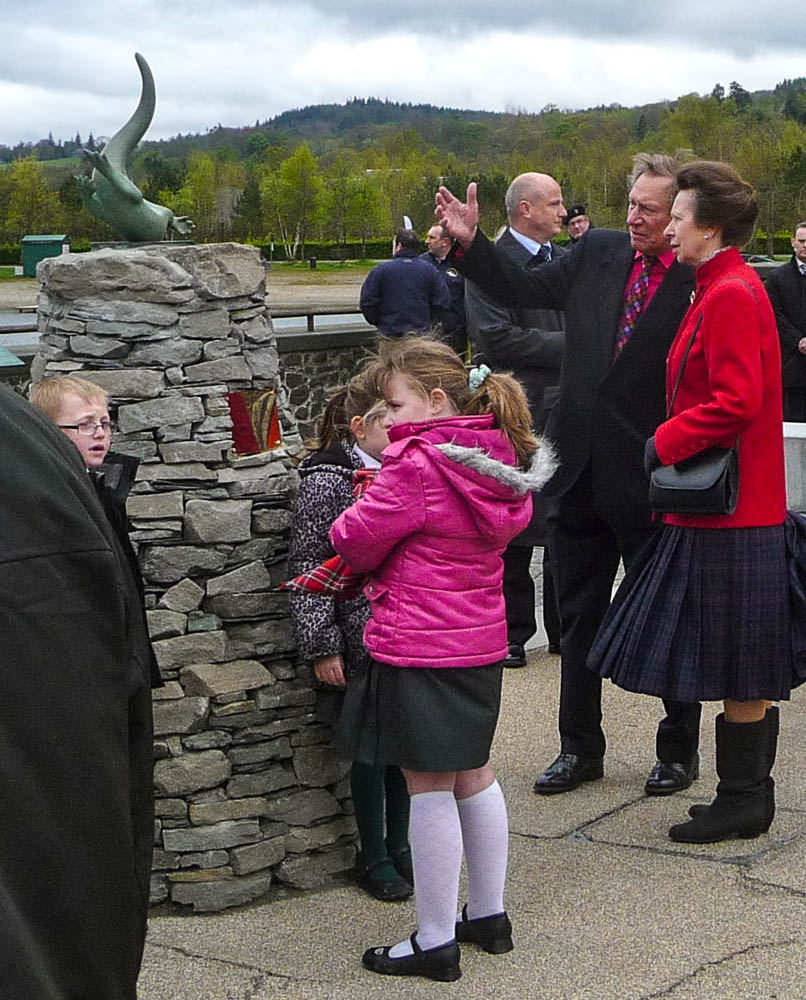
Otter Sculpture unveiling by Princess Anne Loch Lomond

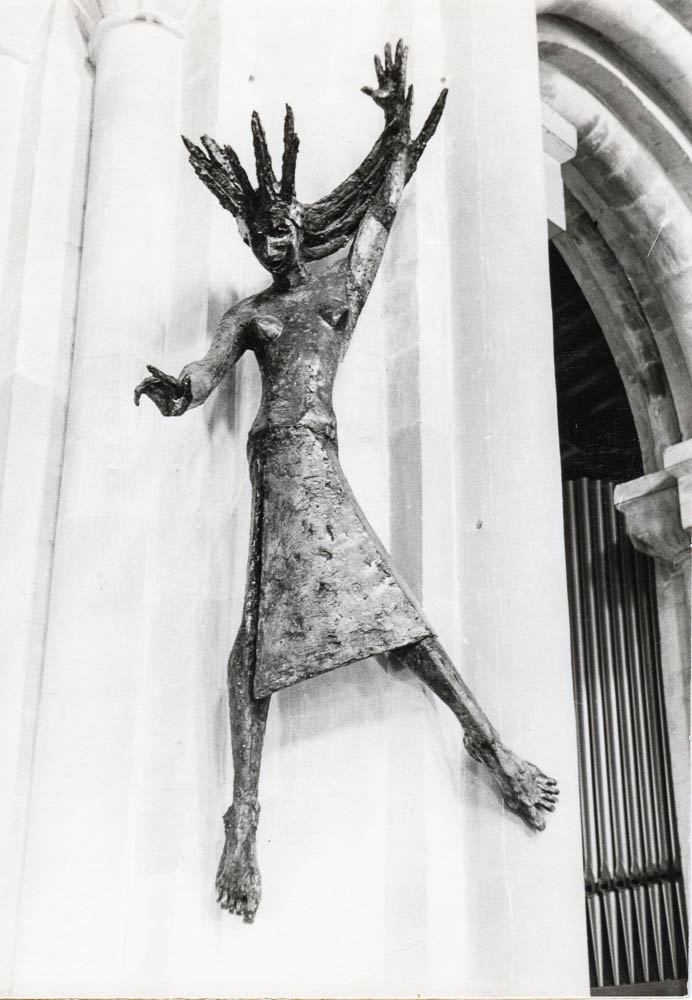
Madonna of the Magnificat, Dunstable Priory

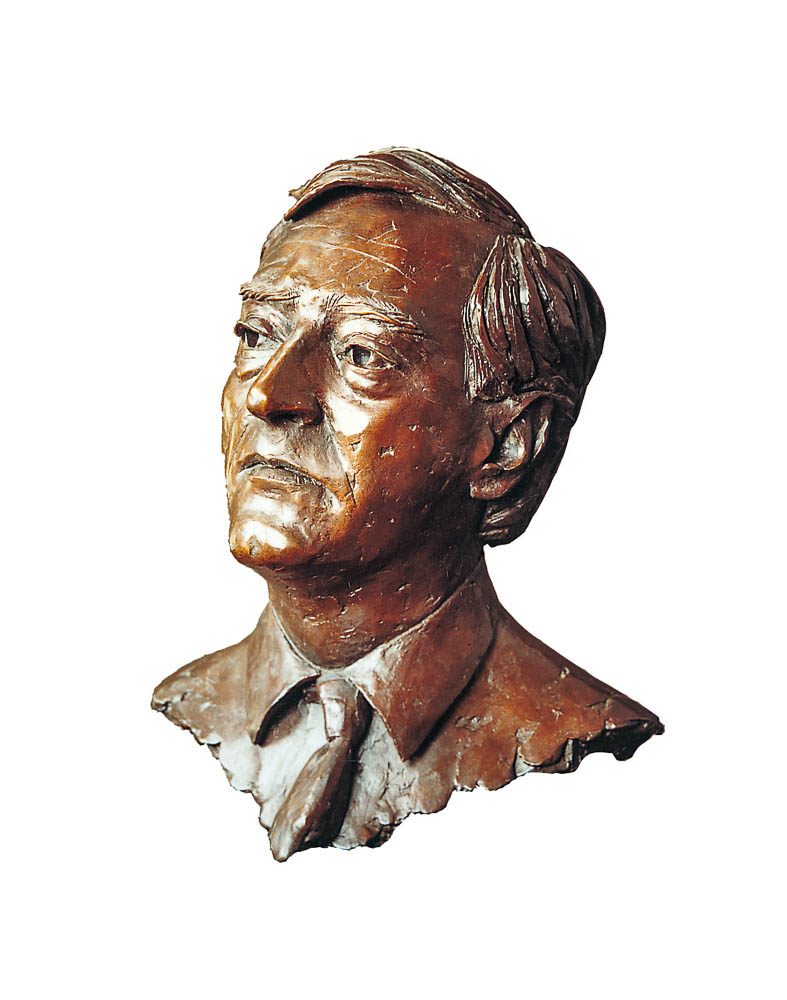
Lord Macdonald, bronze portrait

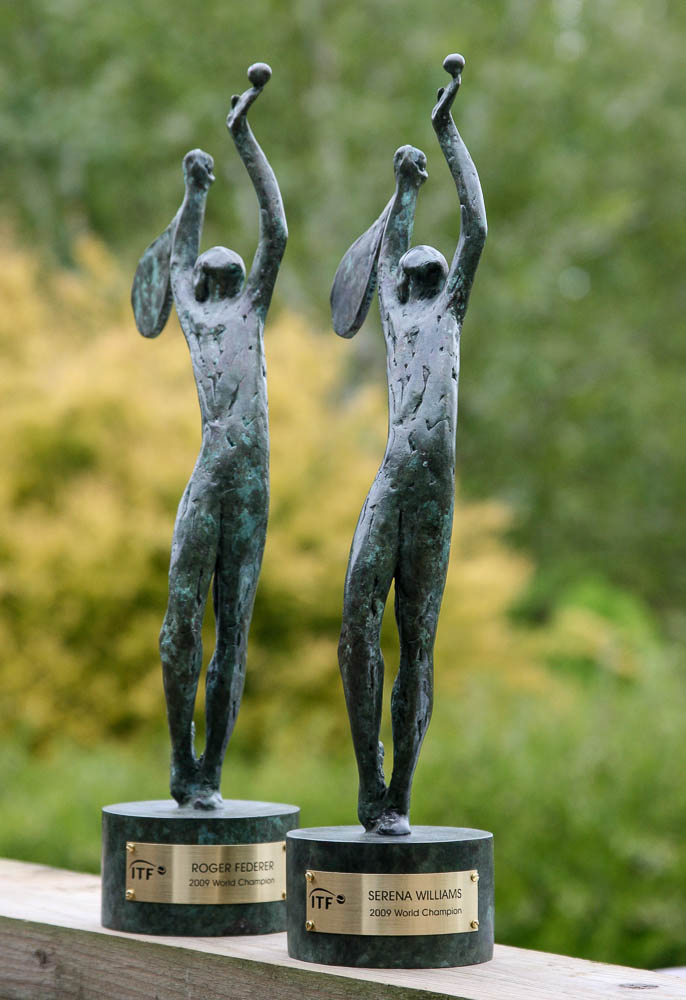
International Tennis Federation World Champion Trophies 2009

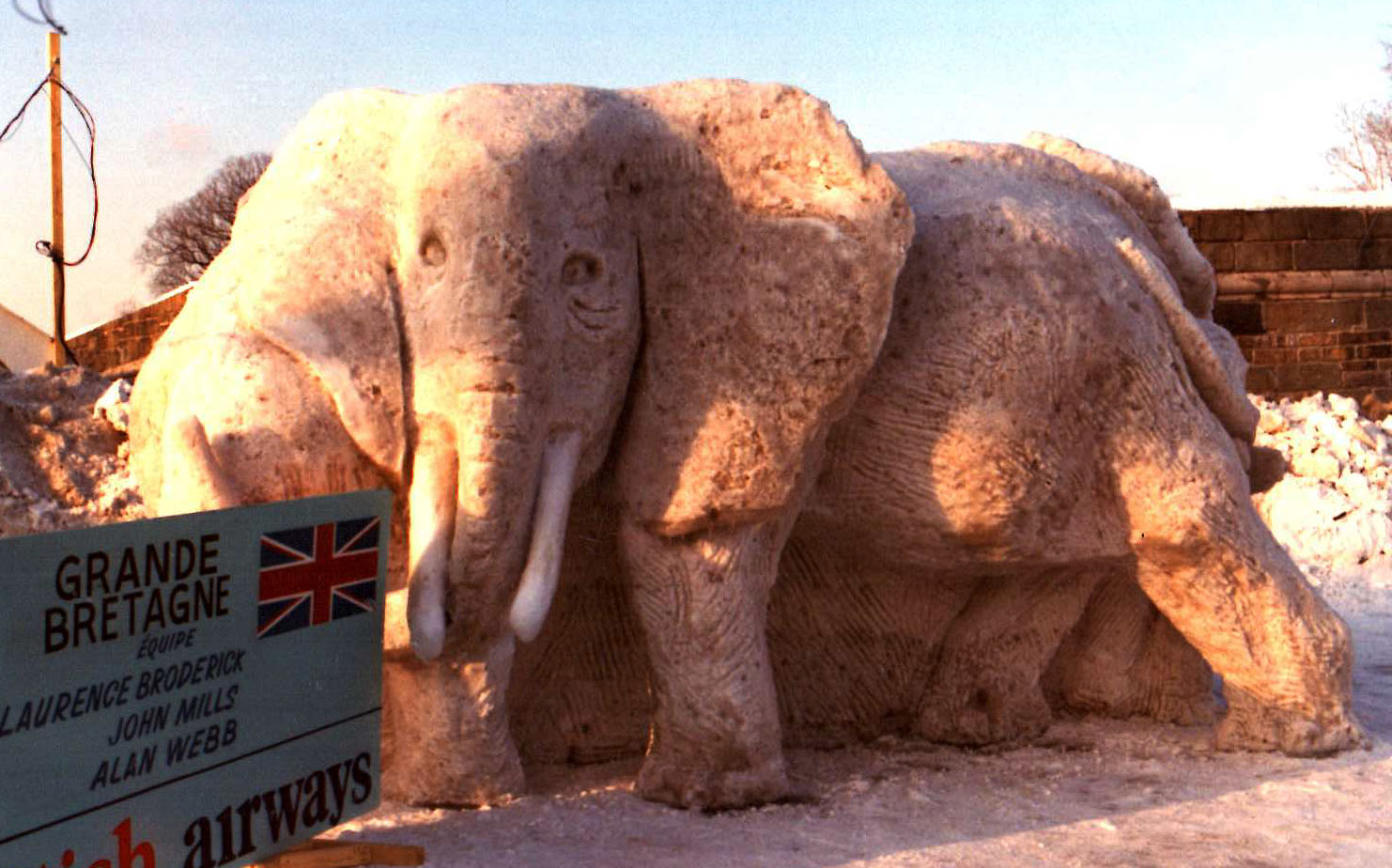
Snow Elephants 1983 Quebec Winter Carnival

- The Bull, Birmingham
- Leaping Salmon, Chester Business Park
- Annual World Champion Trophies, International Tennis Federation
- Goddess Athena and the Owl, Royal Caribbean International
- Family of Otters, E.ON UK plc, Coventry
- Turtle, Prudential plc Art Collection, London
- Mother and Child, Diageo plc, Perth.
- Indian Elephant Calf, Royal Caribbean International
- Teko, Kyleakin, Isle of Skye
- Madonna and Child, All Saints, Weston-super-Mare
- Tortoise, Turtle & Mayan Figures, Vision of the Seas
- Crucifix, The Priory, Christchurch
- Madonna of the Magnificat, The Priory, Dunstable
- St Mark and the Lion, St Mark's, Mansfield
- Sir Roy Calne, Addenbrookes Hospital, Cambridge
- June Marchioness of Aberdeen and Temair, Haddo Arts Trust
- Philippe Chatrier, International Tennis Federation, Stade Roland Garros, Paris
- Maxwell Otter, ADC Ltd, Aberdeen.
- Teko, Balloch, Loch Lomond.
- Elephant Calf, Java Hill Resort, Crozet, Ain, France.

== Exhibitions ==
Group shows with the Royal Academy, Royal Scottish Academy, Royal Society of British Artists, Contemporary Portrait Society, Society of Wildlife Artists and the Royal West of England Academy.

Exhibitions in Scotland, England, Jersey, France, Monaco, Germany, USA and Canada.

== Published works ==
- Soapstone Carving. Tiranti. 1977. ISBN 978-0854586264.

== Works containing Broderick's illustrations ==
- Ports and Harbours. Macdonald Phoebus.
- Henry Purcell and his Times. Hamish Hamilton.
- Uncle Matt's Mountain. New York St Martin's Press.
- Persia The Immortal Kingdom. New York Graphic Society Publishers.
- Everyday Life in Imperial Japan. Hippocrene Books Inc.
- Everyday Life in Traditional Japan. Tuttle Publishing.
