= Hope & Pen-y-ffordd railway station =

Former railway station in Flintshire, Wales

Hope & Pen-y-ffordd
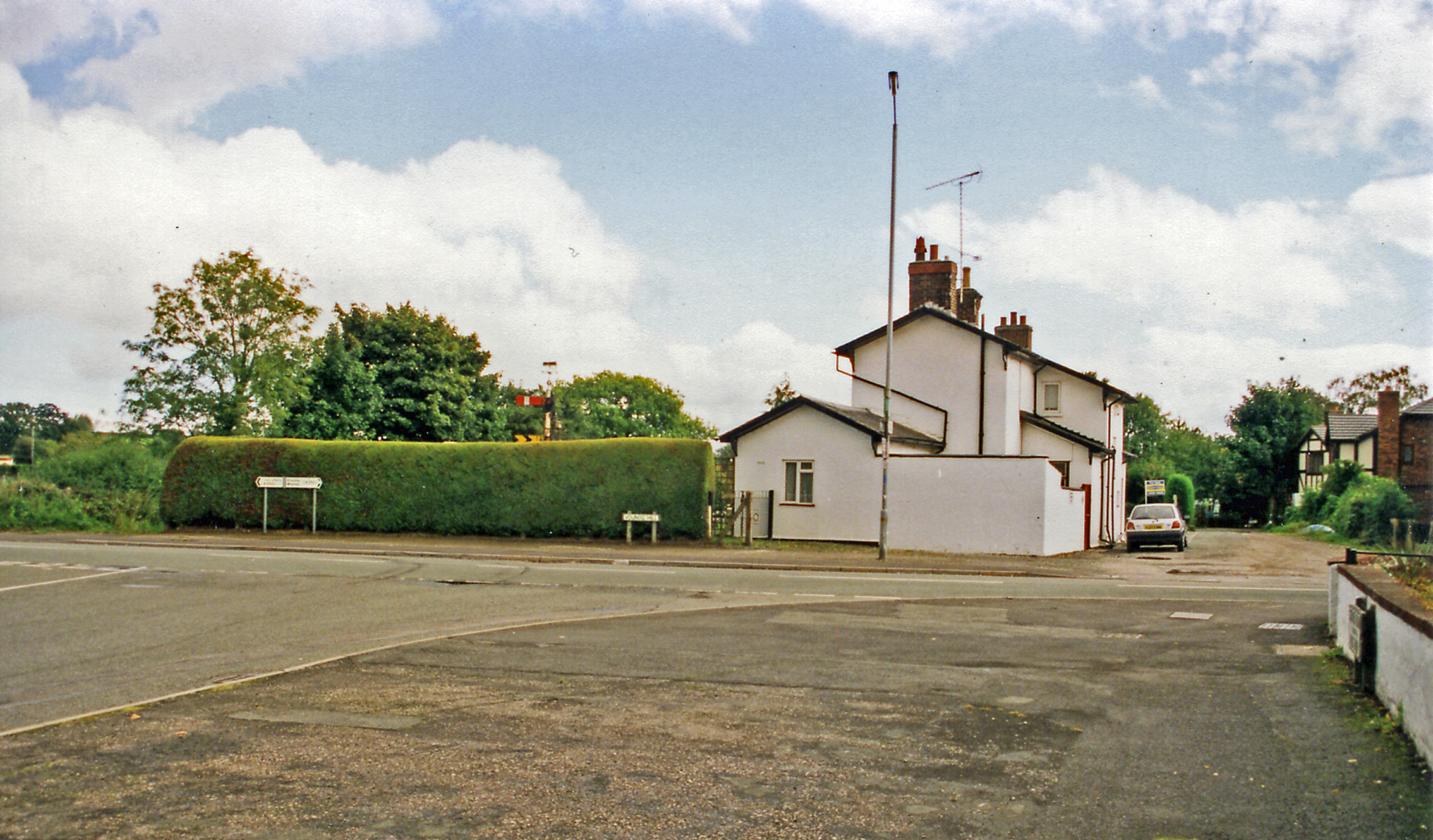
- The former station building in 1999

General information
- Location: Penyffordd, Flintshire; Wales
- Coordinates: 53.1462°N 3.0424°W
- Grid reference: SJ303615

Other information
- Status: Disused

History
- Original company: Mold Railway
- Pre-grouping: London and North Western Railway
- Post-grouping: London, Midland and Scottish Railway

Key dates
- 14 August 1849: Opened
- 30 April 1962: Closed
Location

Hope & Pen-y-ffordd railway station was a station in Penyffordd, Flintshire, Wales. The station was opened on 14 August 1849 and closed on 30 April 1962. The last Station Master/Goods Agent was Mr T G C Jones who transferred to Deganwy on closure.

Preceding station	Disused railways	Following station
Hope Exchange; Line and station closed	London and North Western Railway; Mold Railway	Kinnerton; Line and station closed
