= Chester Business Park =

Business park in Cheshire, England

Coordinates: 53.1614°N 2.9026°W

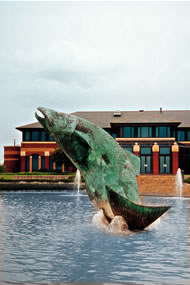
Leaping Salmon at Chester Business Park, by sculptor Laurence Broderick

Chester Business Park is located to the south of the city of Chester, Cheshire, England, and is sited to the east of Wrexham Road (A483) and to the north of the Chester southerly bypass (A55).

The park opened in 1988 and occupies an area of 175 acres (0.71 km^{2}). At the centre of the site is the former Wrexham Road Farm, a model farm designed by John Douglas for the 1st Duke of Westminster and built in 1877–1884; otherwise it was a greenfield site. The farmhouse and outbuildings of the farm were converted into offices, and a number of businesses built premises in modern architectural styles. One of the first major businesses to occupy a new building was Shell Chemicals U.K., and other businesses included Marks & Spencer Financial Services, MBNA International Bank, Bristol-Myers Squibb, and Trinity International.

A Leaping Salmon bronze sculpture by Laurence Broderick is displayed at the Chester Business Park.
