= Lower Kinnerton Hall =

Country house in Cheshire, England

Coordinates: 53.15164°N 2.98722°W

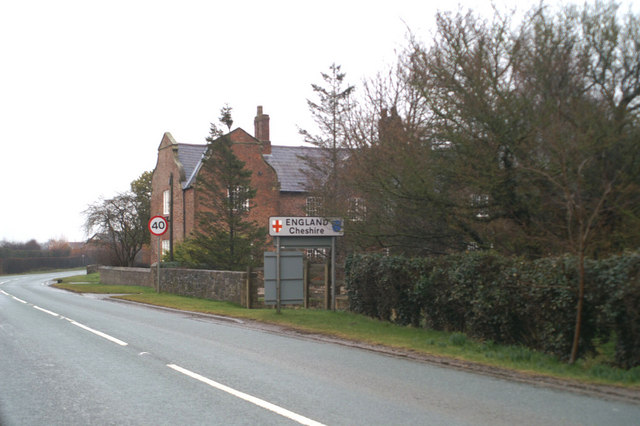
North end of Lower Kinnerton Hall

Lower Kinnerton Hall, also known as Bridge Farmhouse, stands adjacent to the England-Wales border to the west of the village of Lower Kinnerton, Cheshire, England. The house is dated 1685, and carries the initials TTET. Attached to it is a shippon (cattle-shed) dating from the 18th century. A wing was added to the rear in the 19th century. The house is constructed in brown brick with stone dressings, and has a slated roof. It is in two storeys and its entrance front has five bays. There are three large Dutch gables on the entrance front, and another on the north face, each with reverse-curved scrolls supporting pediments. The windows are casements. At the rear of the house is a semi-hexagonal bay window and a timber-framed porch. The shippon is also in two storeys, and constructed in brick with slate roofs. Also at the rear of the house is a cobbled courtyard. The architectural historian Nikolaus Pevsner describes the building as "quite an impressive house". The house and attached shippon are recorded in the National Heritage List for England as a designated Grade II listed building.

== See also ==
- Listed buildings in Lower Kinnerton
