= Lower Kinnerton =

Village in Cheshire, England

Coordinates: 53.1531°N 2.9831°W

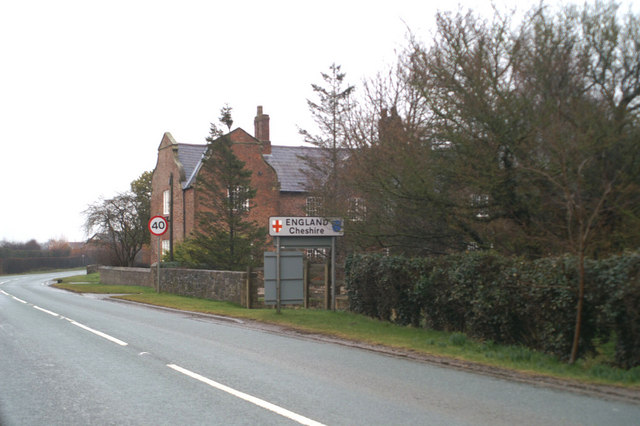
- Bridge Farm, Lower Kinnerton, at the Wales-England border

- Location within Cheshire
- Population: 136 (2011 census)
- OS grid reference: SJ338621
- Civil parish: Dodleston
- Unitary authority: Cheshire West and Chester
- Ceremonial county: Cheshire
- Region: North West
- Country: England
- Sovereign state: United Kingdom
- Post town: CHESTER
- Postcode district: CH4
- Dialling code: 01244
- Police: Cheshire
- Fire: Cheshire
- Ambulance: North West
- UK Parliament: Chester South and Eddisbury

Lower Kinnerton is a village and former civil parish, now in the parish of Dodleston, in the unitary authority of Cheshire West and Chester and the ceremonial county of Cheshire, England, close to the England–Wales border. The neighbouring village of Higher Kinnerton is across the border in Flintshire. Lower Kinnerton is south of Broughton and to the north west of the village of Dodleston. It is a small agricultural community, which is also home to a local kennel and cattery business.

The population was recorded at 97 in 1801, 94 in 1851, 127 in 1901 and 142 in 1951. In the 2001 census it had a population of 119, increasing to 136 at the 2011 census.

Lower Kinnerton Hall (also known as Bridge Farm Farmhouse) was built in 1685, using brown brick with stone dressings and with a slated roof. Attached to the building is a shippon (cattle-shed) dating from the 18th century. Lower Kinnerton Hall is a designated Grade II listed building.

== Governance ==
Lower Kinnerton was formerly a township in the parish of Doddleston, in 1866 Lower Kinnerton became a civil parish, on 1 April 2015 the parish was abolished and merged with Doddleston.

== See also ==
- Listed buildings in Lower Kinnerton
