= St Mary's Church, Dodleston =

Coordinates: 53.1416°N 2.9554°W

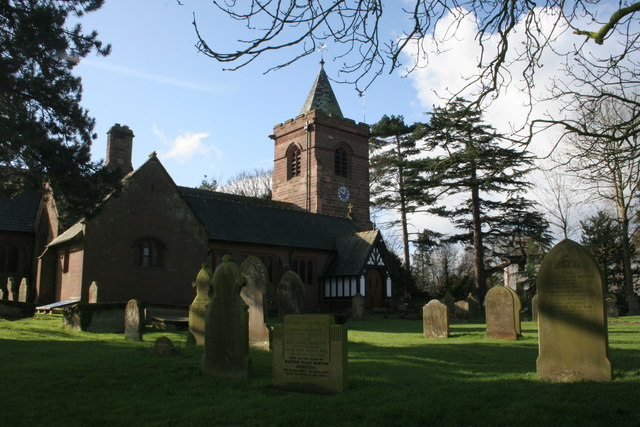
- St Mary's Church, Dodleston

- Location in Cheshire
- OS grid reference: SJ 362,610
- Location: Dodleston, Cheshire
- Country: England
- Denomination: Anglican
- Website: St Mary, Dodleston

History
- Status: Parish church

Architecture
- Functional status: Active
- Heritage designation: Grade II
- Designated: 1 June 1967
- Architect: John Douglas (rebuilding)
- Architectural type: Church
- Style: Gothic Revival
- Completed: 1870

Specifications
- Materials: Red sandstone, Grey slate roofs

Administration
- Province: York
- Diocese: Chester
- Archdeaconry: Chester
- Deanery: Chester
- Parish: Dodleston

St Mary's Church is in the village of Dodleston, Cheshire, England. It is recorded in the National Heritage List for England as a designated Grade II listed building. It is an active Anglican parish church in the diocese of Chester, the archdeaconry of Chester and the deanery of Chester.

== History ==
A church has been on this site, adjacent to a former motte and bailey castle, since at least medieval times but only the base of its tower, which dates from the early 16th century, remains. The remainder of the church was rebuilt in 1870 in Perpendicular style by the Chester architect John Douglas.

== Architecture ==
=== Exterior ===
The church is built in red sandstone with grey slate roofs. Its plan consists of a four-bay nave with a north aisle, a chancel with a north vestry, and a half-timbered gabled north porch. The two-stage tower has a short spire within its crenellated parapet. It has diagonal buttresses and, on the west face, a four-light window. On the south side of the tower is a small ringers' window and the belfry windows have two lights. The east window has five lights and contains panel tracery. On the exterior north wall of the tower are pitted marks which are said to have been made by muskets fired during the Civil War.

=== Interior ===
Inside the church is a fragment of a medieval coffin, and, on the west wall, a royal coat of arms of Charles II dated 1660. The tomb of Thomas Egerton, 1st Viscount Brackley, who died in 1617, his wife, Elizabeth, who died in 1588, is beneath the tower. The octagonal font probably dates from the 17th century. Late 19th-century stained glass is in the east window. There is a ring of six bells, the oldest of which date from about 1500, from 1618, and from 1681. Two bells dated 1870 are by John Warner and Sons, and the newest bell was cast by Gillett & Johnston in 1929. The parish registers begin in 1570 but are not complete.

== External features ==
The lych gate canopy and its wing walls are listed at Grade II. The lych gate has an oak frame on a sandstone plinth and a half-hipped roof of Westmorland slate with a red tile ridge. The wing walls are of red sandstone. In the churchyard is a sundial dated 1732.

== See also ==
- Listed buildings in Dodleston
- List of church restorations, amendments and furniture by John Douglas
