= Kinnerton railway station =

Former railway station in Flintshire, Wales

Kinnerton
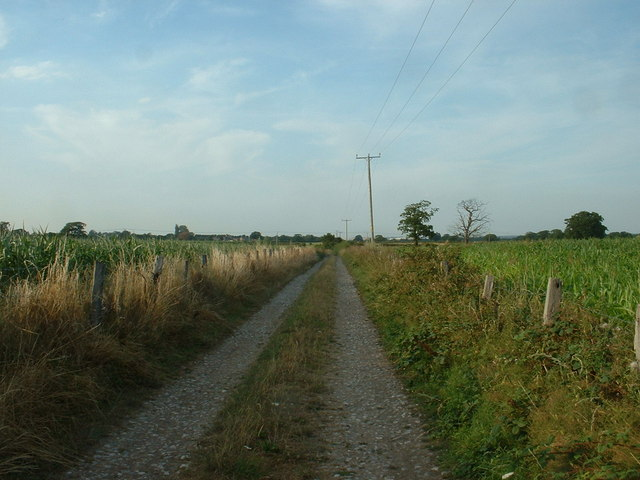
- Disused railway line near to the site of Kinnerton station, in 2006

General information
- Location: Higher Kinnerton, Flintshire; Wales
- Coordinates: 53.1506°N 2.9916°W
- Grid reference: SJ338620

Other information
- Status: Disused

History
- Original company: London and North Western Railway
- Pre-grouping: London and North Western Railway
- Post-grouping: London, Midland and Scottish Railway

Key dates
- 2 February 1891: Opened
- 30 April 1962: Closed
Location

Kinnerton railway station was a station in Higher Kinnerton, Flintshire, Wales. The station was opened on 2 February 1891 and closed on 30 April 1962.

Preceding station	Disused railways	Following station
Hope & Pen-y-ffordd; Line and station closed	London and North Western Railway; Mold Railway	Broughton & Bretton; Line and station closed
