= Listed buildings in Chester =

Listed buildings in Chester are listed in the following articles:

- Grade I listed buildings in Cheshire West and Chester
- Grade II* listed buildings in Cheshire West and Chester
- Grade II listed buildings in Chester (central)
- Grade II listed buildings in Chester (east)
- Grade II listed buildings in Chester (north and west)
- Grade II listed buildings in Chester (south)
- Listed buildings in Chester Castle parish
