= Balderton, Cheshire =

Hamlet in Cheshire, England

Coordinates: 53.15°N 02.94°W

Balderton
- Location within Cheshire
- OS grid reference: SJ3762
- Unitary authority: Cheshire West and Chester
- Ceremonial county: Cheshire
- Region: North West
- Country: England
- Sovereign state: United Kingdom
- Post town: CHESTER
- Postcode district: CH4
- Police: Cheshire
- Fire: Cheshire
- Ambulance: North West
- UK Parliament: Chester South and Eddisbury

Balderton is a hamlet in Cheshire, England.

Nearby is Eaton Hall from where the Eaton Hall Railway, one of the first 15-inch gauge railways, ran to the goods yard of the GWR railway station. Both of these have closed.

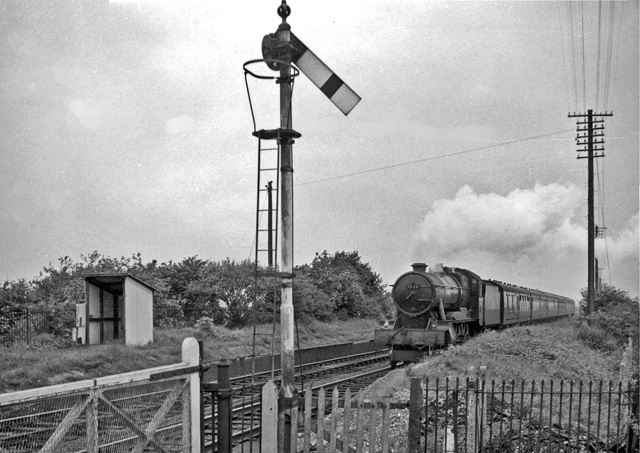
The level crossing at Balderton in 1961
