= Eccleston, Cheshire =

Village in Cheshire, England

Coordinates: 53.157°N 2.880°W

Eccleston
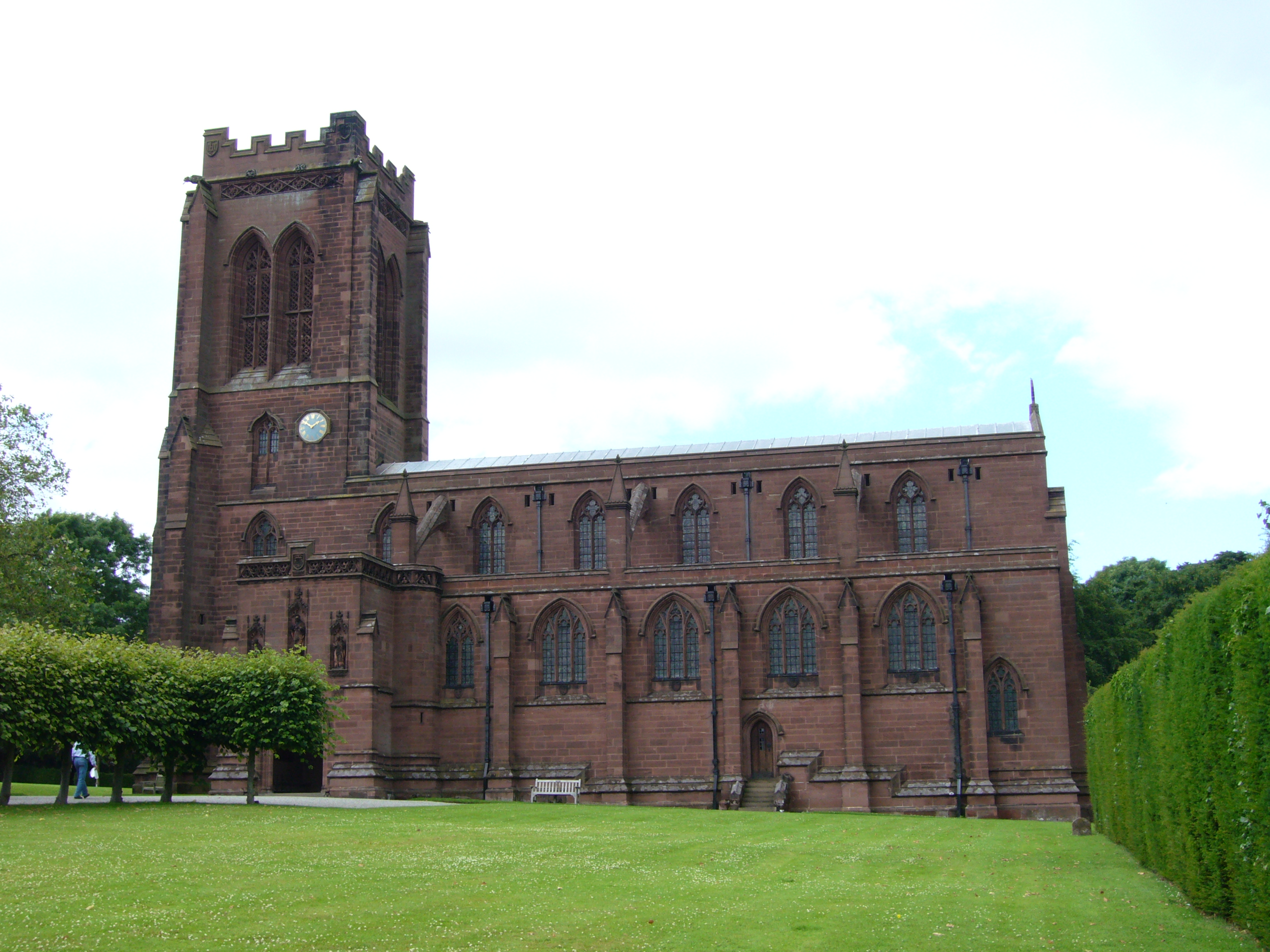
- St Mary's Church

- Location within Cheshire
- Population: 246 (2011 census)
- OS grid reference: SJ412626
- Civil parish: Eaton and Eccleston
- Unitary authority: Cheshire West and Chester
- Ceremonial county: Cheshire
- Region: North West
- Country: England
- Sovereign state: United Kingdom
- Post town: CHESTER
- Postcode district: CH4
- Dialling code: 01244
- Police: Cheshire
- Fire: Cheshire
- Ambulance: North West
- UK Parliament: Chester South and Eddisbury

Eccleston is a village and former civil parish, now in the parish of Eaton and Eccleston, in the borough of Cheshire West and Chester, in the ceremonial county of Cheshire, England. The village is approximately 2.7 miles (4.3 km) to the south of Chester, near to the River Dee. The village is situated on the estate of the Duke of Westminster who maintains his ancestral home at nearby Eaton Hall.

According to the 2001 census, the population of the parish was 184. The population of the civil parish was recorded as 246 in the 2011 census.

== History ==
It is believed that the name of the village derives from the Primitive Welsh eglẹ̄s (a church) and the Old English tūn (a settlement, farmstead or estate).

The village, mentioned as Eclestone in the Domesday Book of 1086, was on a Roman road to Chester. The settlement consisted of seven households (four villagers, one smallholder and two slaves) on land under the ownership of Gilbert de Venables ('Gilbert the hunter'). In 1066 it was worth 1 pound 10 shillings and in 1086 it was worth 2 pounds 14 shillings despite being waste in 1070 suggesting a very quick economic rebound; it was also one of the most profitable manors that de Venables owned. It also had a boat and net (suggesting fishing), 5 hides paying geld, and 6 units of ploughland. The Normans built an early motte castle at Eccleston, one of a series forming a defence against Welsh raids on the farmlands of Cheshire, and emphasising the new post-Conquest order. The castle mound is preserved as a scheduled monument.

Eccleston was largely rebuilt as an estate village by the Dukes of Westminster in the 19th century. The Cheshire volume of the Buildings of England series describes it as "the prime Eaton estate village" and "a showpiece". Many of the buildings, including St Mary's School and the shelter in the middle of the road junction at the centre of the village, were designed by John Douglas, the favoured architect of the Grosvenor family at the time. The 17th-century manor house pre-dates the Victorian rebuilding.

Formerly a township in Broxton Hundred, it includes the hamlets of Belgrave and Morris Oak. The population was 199 in 1801, 289 in 1851, 320 in 1901 and 272 in 1951.

Eccleston was the site of a ferry across the River Dee.

== Church ==
The church at Eccleston is called St. Mary's Church. It was built at the expense of the 1st Duke of Westminster and cost £40,000 in 1899.

It was built on the site of an earlier church that was constructed in 1809. Part of the churchyard is unusual in that it is circular in shape, which indicates pagan origins. In 1929 an excavation revealed 20 bodies which are believed to date from 390 AD. They are the earliest known Christian burials in Cheshire.

The Old Churchyard is the resting place of the Dukes of Westminster. Also buried here are Alfred Ernest Ind VC, who died on 29 November 1916, Sir Henry Nelson Clowes KCVO (1911–1993), Sir Philip Hay KCVO (1918–1986), Private Secretary to the Duchess of Kent, and his wife Dame Margaret Katherine Hay DCVO (1918–1975), Woman of the Bedchamber to Queen Elizabeth II, a granddaughter of 1st Duke of Westminster.

== Governance ==
Eccleston is represented by the Constituency of the Chester South and Eddisbury in the UK House of Commons.

In local government, the unitary authority of Cheshire West and Chester replaced Chester City Council and Cheshire County Council on 1 April 2009. Eccleston is within the electoral ward of Christleton and Huntington.

Eccleston civil parish was abolished on 1 April 2015 to form Eaton and Eccleston, with part also transferring to Dodleston. It is governed by a parish council, made up of a seven-members. Meetings are held in the Eccleston Village Hall in the 3rd week of January, May, July and October each year. There are also special meetings scheduled to deal with specific issues when needed.

== See also ==
- Listed buildings in Eccleston, Cheshire
