= Dodleston =

Village in Cheshire, England

Coordinates: 53.1416°N 2.9554°W

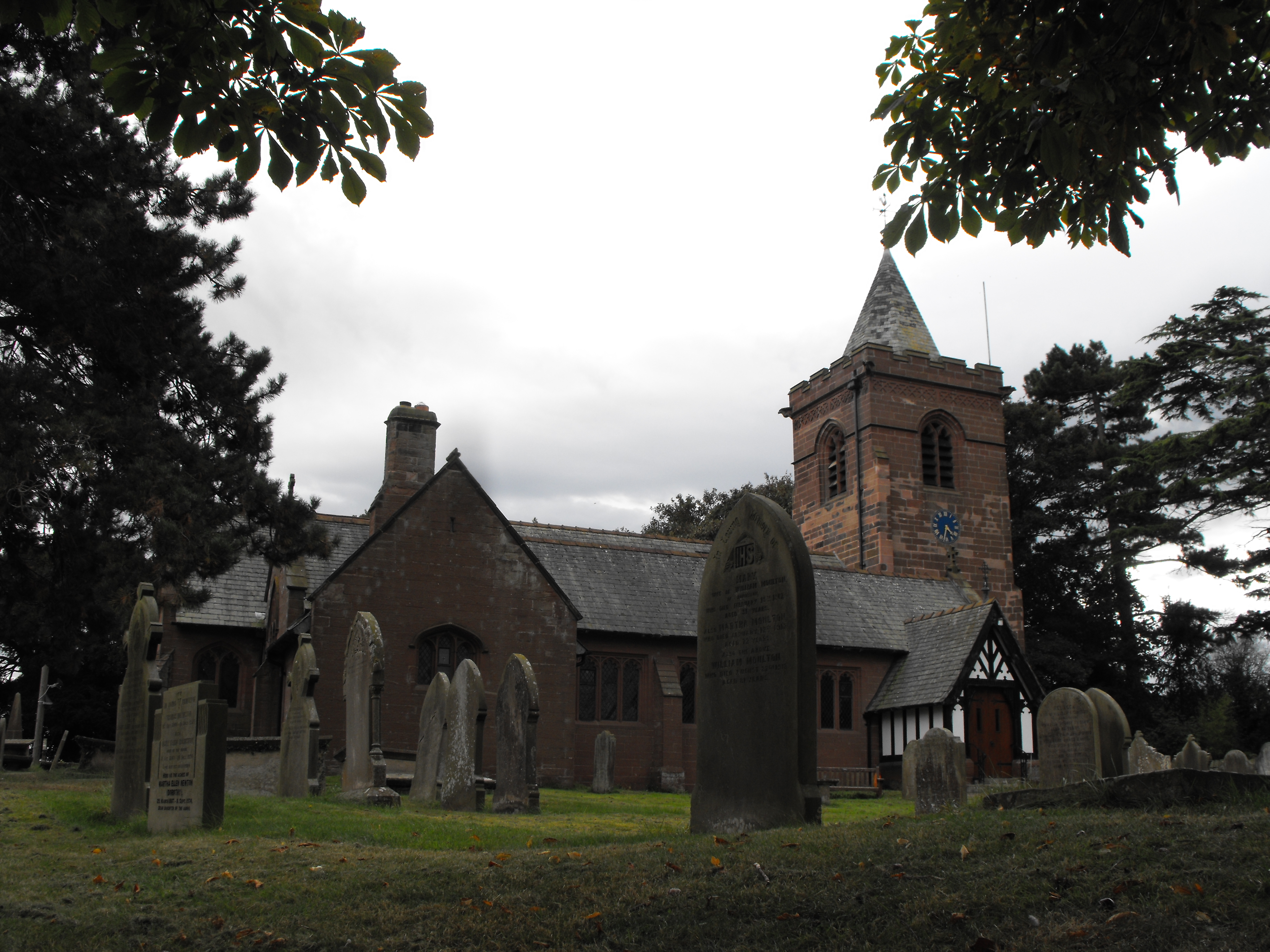
- St Mary's Church, Dodleston

- Location within Cheshire
- Population: 715 (2011 census)
- OS grid reference: SJ362610
- Civil parish: Dodleston
- Unitary authority: Cheshire West and Chester
- Ceremonial county: Cheshire
- Region: North West
- Country: England
- Sovereign state: United Kingdom
- Post town: CHESTER
- Postcode district: CH4
- Dialling code: 01244
- Police: Cheshire
- Fire: Cheshire
- Ambulance: North West
- UK Parliament: Chester South and Eddisbury

Dodleston is a village and civil parish in the unitary authority of Cheshire West and Chester and the ceremonial county of Cheshire, England. The village is situated to the south west of Chester, very close to the England–Wales border. The civil parish includes Balderton, Gorstella, Lower Kinnerton and Rough Hill. It is one of the three old Cheshire parishes which are situated on the Flintshire side of the River Dee.

Dodleston has a village shop with post office, village hall, village green, a C of E primary school, the Grade II listed St Mary's Church and the Grade II listed 'Red Lion' pub. It also contains some good examples of buildings by the 19th-century architect John Douglas.

At the 2001 census, the population of Dodleston was 777, reducing to 715 at the 2011 census.

== History ==
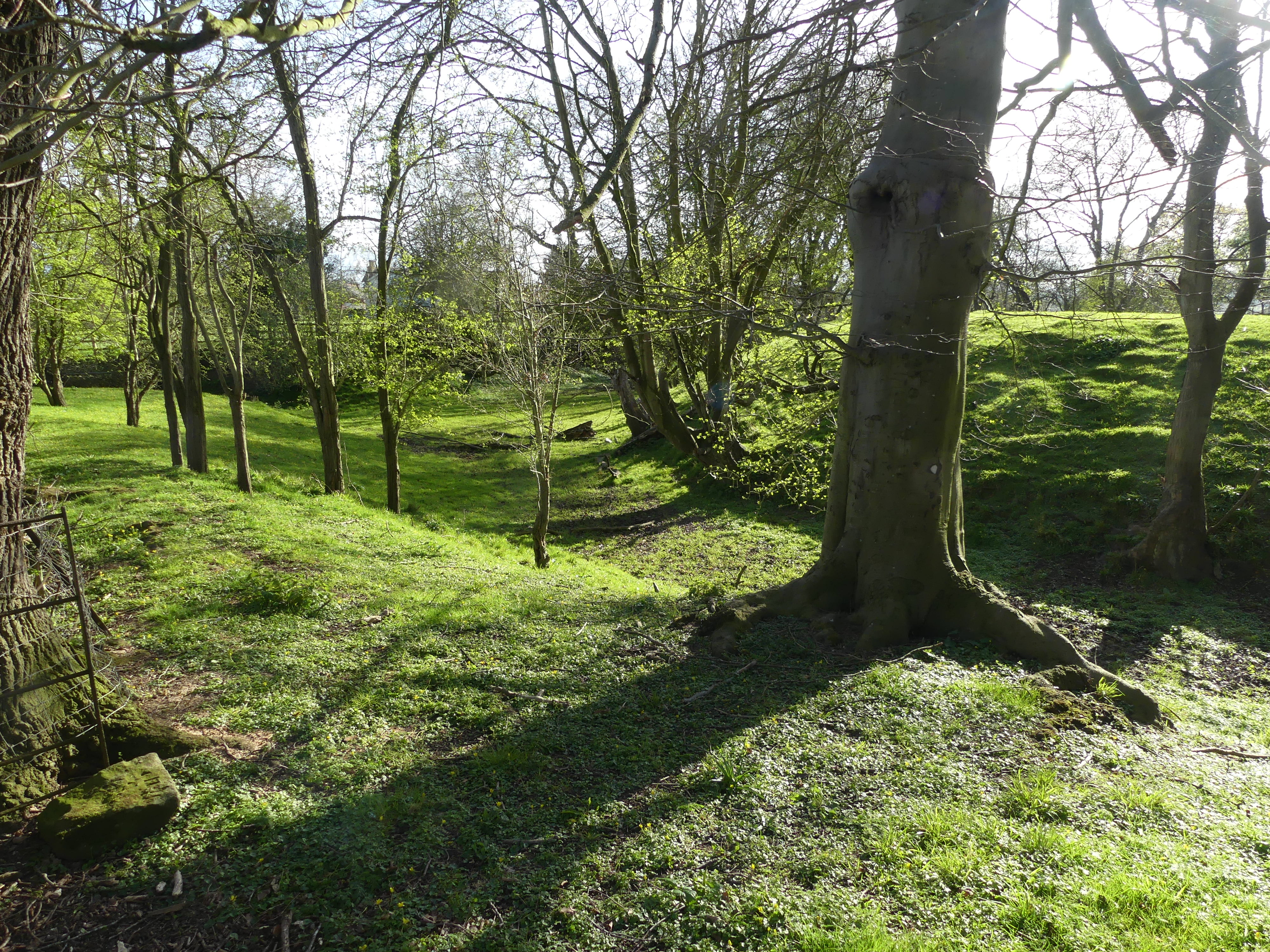
Dodleston Castle survives as an earthwork.

The name Dodleston likely derives from the Old English personal noun Dod(d)el and the word tūn, meaning "an enclosure, farmstead or settlement". In 1086, Dodleston was recorded in the Domesday Book as a relatively large settlement within the hundred of Ati's Cross and in the county of Cheshire. The castle at Dodleston was first mentioned in 1277, but was likely founded in the 12th century.

Dodleston was a township in Broxton Hundred. The population was recorded over time as 185 in 1801, 258 in 1851, 307 in 1901, 267 in 1951 and significantly increasing to 777 by 2001.

The village was also the birthplace of Sir Thomas Egerton (1540–1617), who rose to importance during the latter years of Elizabeth I and the early reign of James I. Because of his high status he could have been buried in either Westminster Abbey or St Paul's Cathedral in London, but chose St Mary's Church, Dodleston, as his final resting place.

=== Association with Mallory ===
In the early 1980s the old order of life in a small country village was considerably affected by the development of a new housing estate, which became known as Boydell Park. Within Boydell Park and branching off Penfold Way is Mallory Walk, which is a cul de sac with footpath access to other areas of Dodleston.

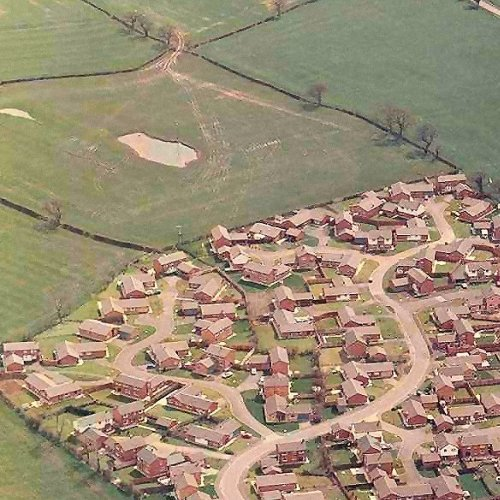
Penfold Way in 1982

Mallory Walk is named after Canon Herbert Leigh-Mallory, who was Rector of St Mary's Church between the years 1927 to 1940, having previously been incumbent at St John's Church in Birkenhead. His son George Mallory was the English mountaineer who took part in the first three British expeditions to conquer Mount Everest in the early 1920s.

== Governance ==
Dodleston is within the City of Chester parliamentary constituency.

An electoral ward in the name of Dodleston and Huntington existed at the time of the 2011 census, which covered both of the parishes plus their surrounding areas. The total population was recorded as 3,958. As of 2026, Dodleston is within the Christleton and Huntington Ward of the unitary authority of Cheshire West and Chester. The village has its own ten-member elected parish council.

== Dodleston messages story ==
Dodleston is the setting for the "Dodleston Messages", a series of messages from a man in 1546 allegedly received from 1984 by author Ken Webster through a BBC Micro computer supposedly haunted by ghosts. The mystery also involved apparent messages from another persona which claimed to be from the year 2109.

== See also ==
- Listed buildings in Dodleston
