= 122 Foregate Street, Chester =

Building in Cheshire, England

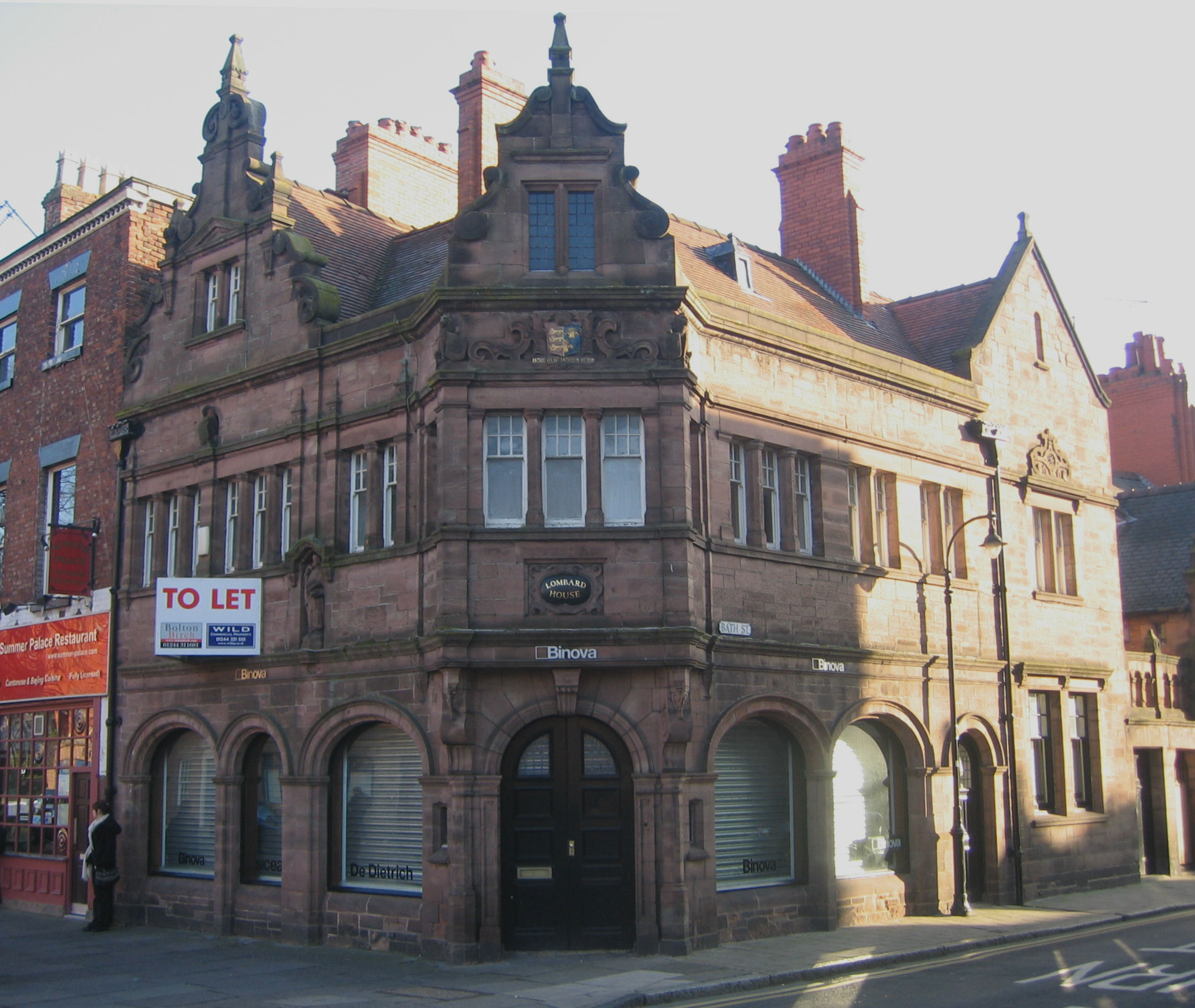
- 122 Foregate Street, Chester

- Location in Cheshire
- 53.1917°N 2.8830°W
- Location: Chester, Cheshire, England

History
- Built: 1902
- Built for: Prudential Assurance

Site notes
- Architect: John Douglas

Listed Building – Grade II
- Designated: 10 January 1972
- Reference no.: 1375812

122 Foregate Street is a building at the corner of the north side of Foregate Street and the east side of Bath Street, Chester, Cheshire, England. It is recorded in the National Heritage List for England as a designated Grade II listed building.

== History ==
The building was designed by the local architect John Douglas for Prudential Assurance, and constructed in 1902. It has since been used by the Lombard Bank and later as a shop. In the late 2000s it was a beauty salon and in 2009 planning permission was given by Cheshire West and Chester Borough Council for it to be converted into a café and offices.

== Architecture ==
The building is constructed in red sandstone rubble and it has a red clay tile roof. Its style is "Douglas' Germanic 17th-century manner". The building has two storeys plus a loft in the roof. It stands adjacent to the terrace of houses designed by Douglas in Bath Street. The corner of the building between the streets is angled with an arched doorway in the ground floor. The upper storey is jettied and carried on consoles over pilasters flanking the door. This storey contains a mullioned three-light sash window over which is a cornice and a carving of the Chester City coat of arms. Above this a Baroque-shaped gable containing a two-light window and at its summit is an obelisk finial.

The front facing Foregate Street contains three arched windows on the ground floor, the middle one being narrow than the others. The upper storey has eight sash windows over which are a frieze and a cornice. Over the easterly six windows is another Baroque-shaped gable similar to that over the entrance door, but larger. The front facing Bath Street has two arched windows at the north end, then an arched doorway. Beyond this in the south bay, are two sash windows. In the upper storey are nine sash windows; over the pair of windows in the south bay is a cartouche. Over the south bay is a plain gable with coping and a short finial. In the roof facing Foregate Street and in that facing Bath Street is a lucarne with a finial. Two brick chimney stacks rise from the roof. A stone screen with a balustrade links the building to the house at number 1 Bath Street.

== See also ==
- Grade II listed buildings in Chester (east)
- List of non-ecclesiastical and non-residential works by John Douglas
