= 113 and 117 Foregate Street, Chester =

Pair of shops in Cheshire, England

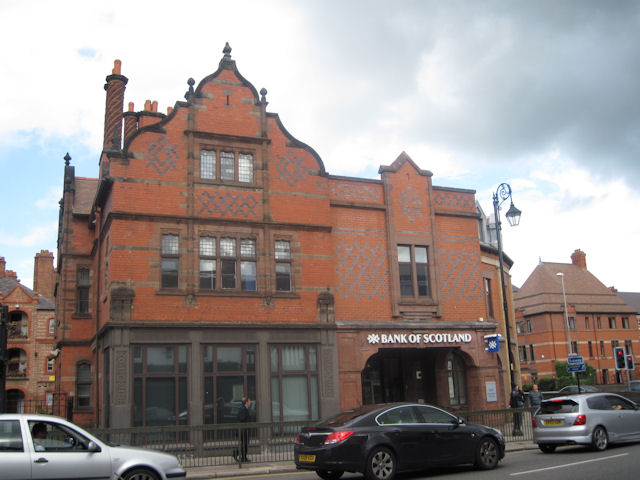
- Foregate Street, Chester, showing number 119 on the left

- Location in Cheshire
- 53.1918°N 2.8838°W

History
- Built: 1889–91
- Built for: 1st Duke of Westminster

Site notes
- Architect: Douglas & Fordham

Listed Building – Grade II
- Designated: 23 July 1998
- Reference no.: 1375808, 1375811

113 and 117 Foregate Street consist of a pair of shops on the north side of Foregate Street, Chester, Cheshire, England. Each of the buildings is recorded in the National Heritage List for England as a designated Grade II listed building. The buildings flank a passage leading to the block of flats numbered 115 and known as Parker's Buildings; this is also a Grade II listed building.

== 113 Foregate Street ==
This was a pre-existing building remodelled in 1890–91 by the local architect John Douglas. The work was done for the 1st Duke of Westminster. The building is constructed in red Ruabon brick with sandstone dressings, and has a red clay tile roof. It has three storeys. In the ground floor of the front facing the street is a modern shop front. In each storey are three sash windows, surrounded by ornate stone cases. At the top of the front facing the street is a shaped gable containing blue brick diapering and with stone coping, volutes and five finials. Towards the right corner is a wrought iron sign bracket dated 1890. The side facing the passage leading to Parker's Buildings is built on a high sandstone plinth. It includes a chimney with a shaped stack and a number of stone-dressed windows. To the rear of the building is a two-storey wing.

== 117 Foregate Street ==
This is a new building of 1889–90 designed by Douglas & Fordham for the 1st Duke of Westminster. In 1990 it was converted and attached to new offices. Like number 113, it is constructed in red Ruabon brick with sandstone dressings, it has a red tile roof, and is in three storeys. The ground floor was refaced in 1990. In the first floor of the front facing the street is a three-light mullioned and transomed casement window, with a single-light transomed window on each side. In the top storey is a three-light casement window. Below this window, and to each side, is blue brick diapering. Between the storeys, and over the top window, are stone bands. The gable is broadly similar to that of number 113, being shaped with stone coping and finials. The side facing the passage to Parker's Buildings contains quoins, windows, two projecting shaped gables and two chimneys with spiral brick flues. At the rear is another gable and a chimney.

== See also ==
- Grade II listed buildings in Chester (east)
- List of non-ecclesiastical and non-residential works by John Douglas
