= Storyhouse =

Independent arts centre in Chester, England

Coordinates: 53.1927°N 2.8929°W

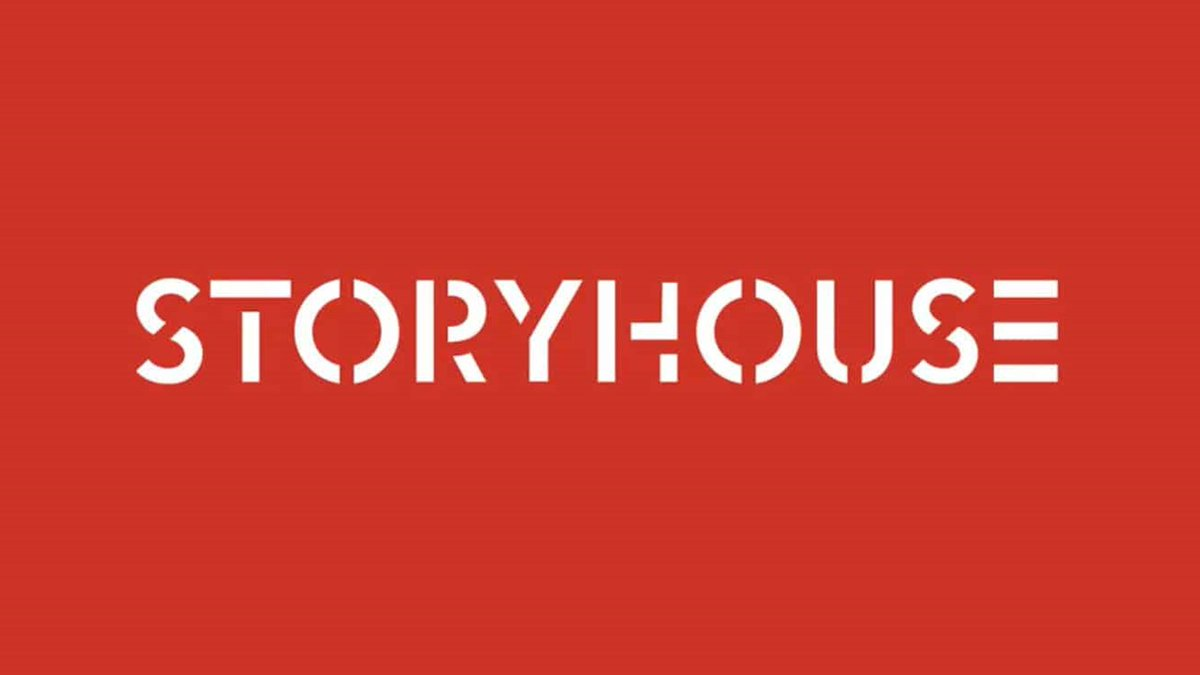
- Logo for Storyhouse

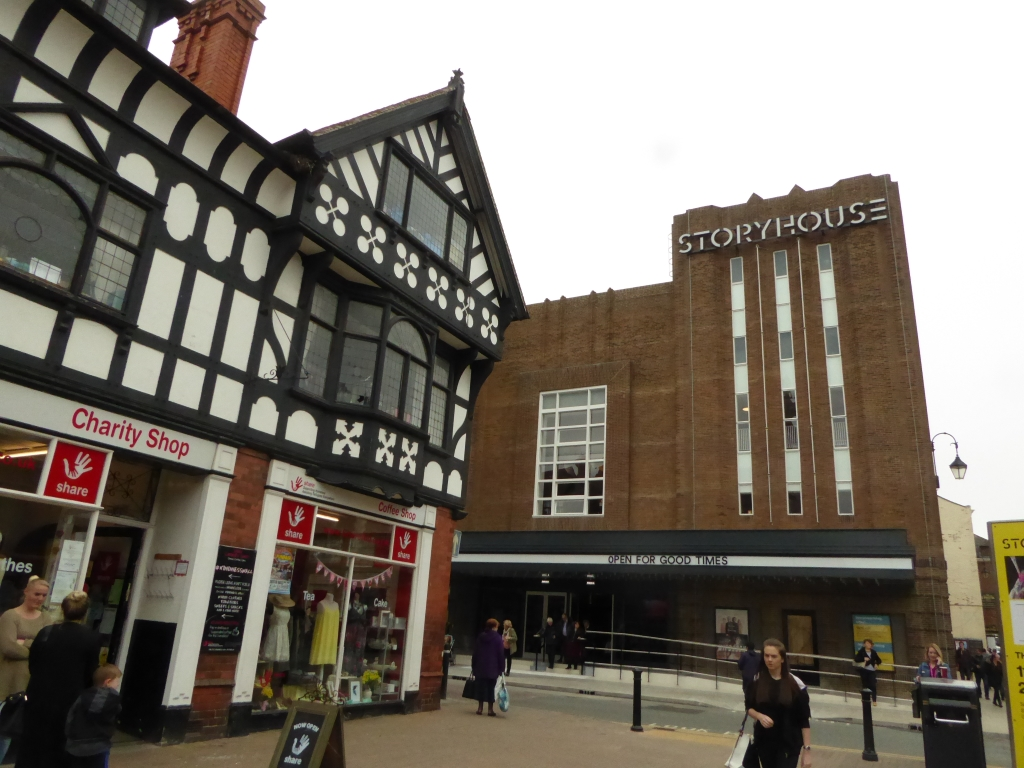
- Storyhouse arts centre
- Interactive map of Storyhouse
- Former names: Odeon Cinema (1936-2007)
- Address: Hunter St, Chester CH1 2AR; Chester; England
- Capacity: 800
- Type: Cultural Centre
- Events: Library, theatre and cinema

Construction
- Opened: 17 May 2017
- Cost: £37,000,000
- Architect: Bennetts Associates
- Builder: Kier

Website
- www.storyhouse.com

Listed Building – Grade II
- Official name: Odeon Buildings and Odeon Cinema
- Designated: 7 February 1989
- Reference no.: 1376369

Storyhouse is a large, mixed-use cultural building in Chester, England, which opened in May 2017. The complex includes a theatre, cinema, restaurant and the city library. It is housed in the remodelled 1936 Odeon Cinema, a grade-II-listed building, together with a newly built extension to hold the theatre auditorium.

== History ==
The Odeon cinema opened in Chester on 3 October 1936. It was designed in the Art Deco style by Robert Bullivant, under the leadership of Harry Weedon, with a total auditorium capacity of over 1600 seats. While most Odeons of that time were faced in ceramic tiles, red brick was used in Chester to respect its historic setting, near both the cathedral and the Victorian town hall. In 1976 the Odeon was converted to a three screen cinema; two more screens were added in 1991. The main internal fabric and proscenium arch remained intact. The building was listed Grade II by Historic England, then English Heritage, in 1989. The Odeon closed in 2007 and remained unused until the Storyhouse development.

The Gateway Theatre in the centre of town opened in 1969, with a capacity of 440 seats. It was closed by the City Council in 2007 to make way for the proposed Northgate development, which was intended to include a new theatre. Due to the 2008 financial crisis, the development did not proceed. The project has subsequently been resurrected; the proposal updated in 2018 does not contain a theatre, but includes a multi screen cinema. From 2007 onwards, there was neither a professional theatre or cinema in Chester city, though the studio theatre of the now defunct Gateway is used by non-professional groups.

The Grosvenor Park Open Air Theatre opened in 2010. It has an eight-week summer repertory season held in an open-air theatre constructed each summer in Grosvenor Park. It typically shows a Shakespeare comedy and a tragedy, plus an adaptation of a children's classic. The company was originally known as Chester Performs and in 2016 became the basis of the Storyhouse theatre company.

== The Storyhouse Project ==
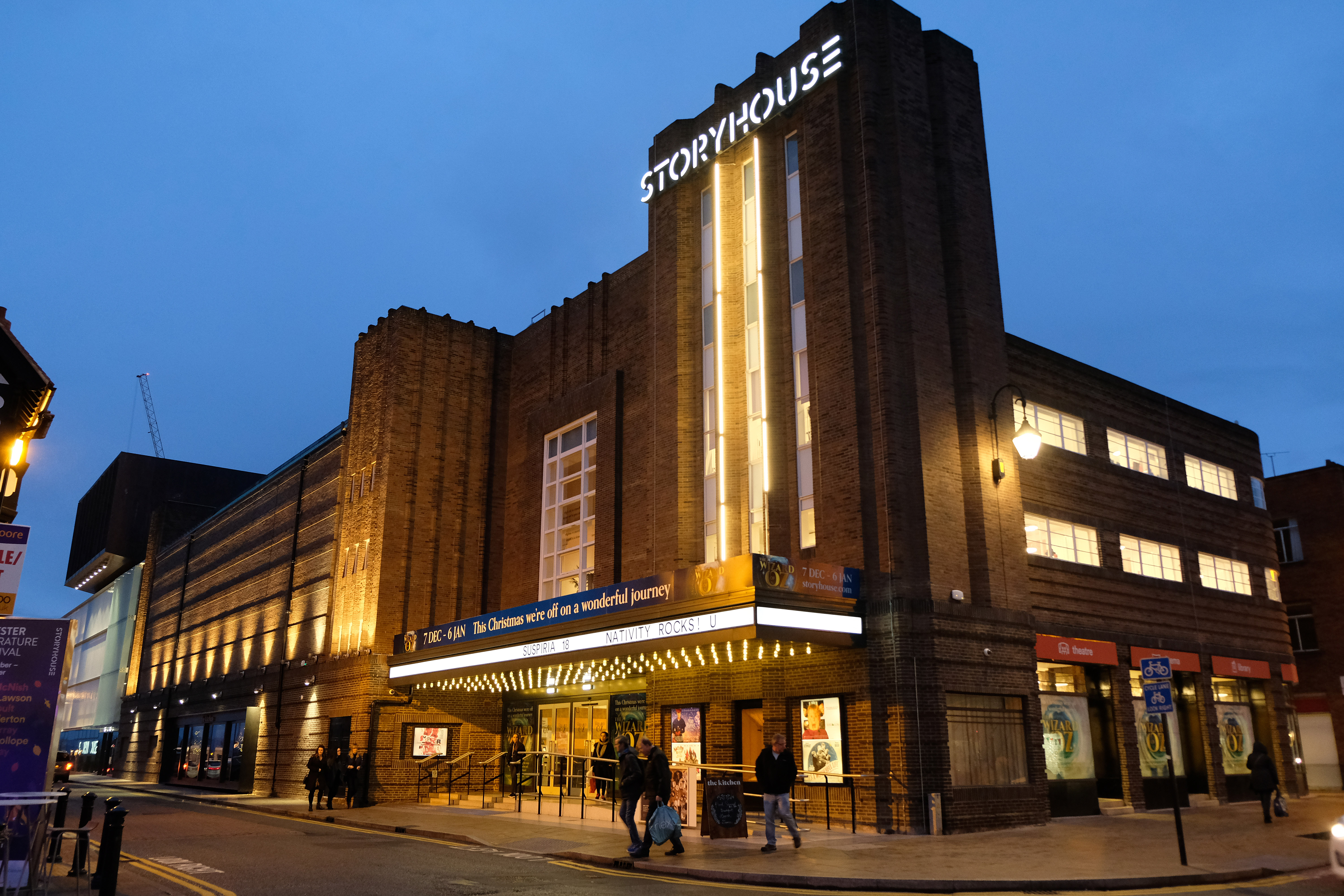
The building in 2018

Following the 2009 local government reorganisation, Chester became part of the unitary authority of Cheshire West and Chester. The decision was made in 2012 to transform the now derelict Odeon Cinema into a new theatre. A multi-discipline design and construction team was appointed, led by Kier Northern. The architects, Bennetts Associates, and theatre planners, Charcoalblue, had both worked on the renovation of the Royal Shakespeare Theatre. It was soon evident that the cinema building was inadequate to house a theatre. The adjacent office block, Commerce House, was demolished in 2013 and the plan revised to create an integrated cultural hub, providing theatre, cinema, library and restaurant. Planning permission was granted in 2014 and was followed by an archeological survey, which revealed remains of Roman roads. Construction started in 2015 and was completed by Spring 2017. Following a public consultation led by Manchester agency True North, the name Storyhouse was adopted in 2016 to cover both the building and the activities contained within it. Of Storyhouse's £37m build cost, Cheshire West and Chester Council contributed £33m, with the remainder coming from Arts Council England and major local employer MBNA. It was the UK's largest regional arts project and the biggest capital development in Chester for 50 years.

Alex Clifton was appointed artistic director of Storyhouse in 2015.

=== Opening ===
The building opened on 17 May 2017 with Clifton's new version of John Gay's The Beggar's Opera. Storyhouse received its official opening by Queen Elizabeth II and Meghan, Duchess of Sussex, on 14 June 2018.

== Current uses ==
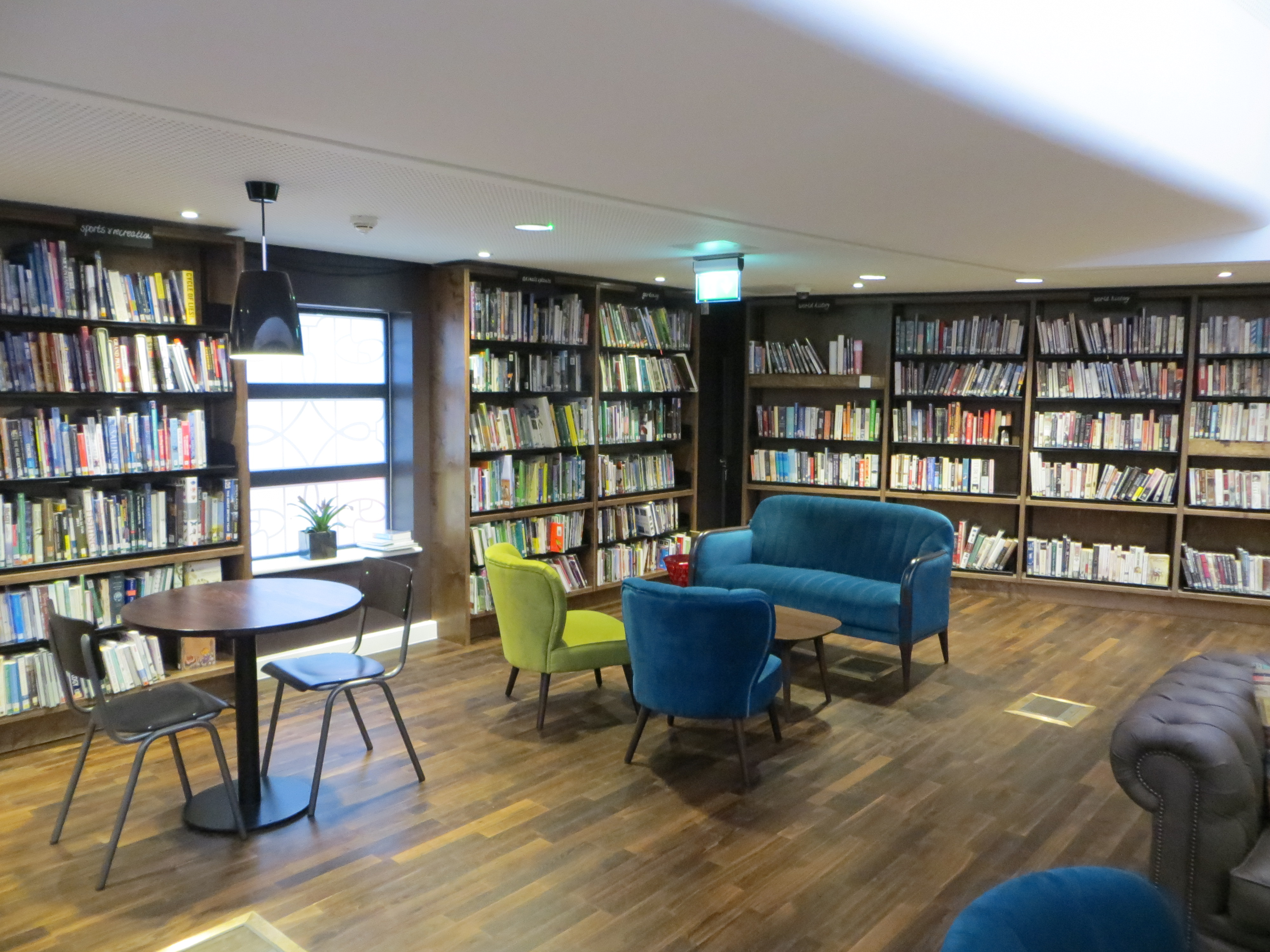
Chester Library, Storyhouse

The Storyhouse building serves four uses: a theatre, cinema, library and restaurant. The theatre is contained in the extension, which is located behind the position of the screen of the original Odeon. The main auditorium can be arranged in an 800-seat proscenium format, which is used to house visiting shows during autumn and spring. It can be reconfigured to form a 500-seat thrust stage for in-house productions, typically the Christmas show and productions destined to move to the Grosvenor Park open air theatre. There is in addition a 150-seat studio Garrett Theatre and linked bar, which sit over the main auditorium. The shell of the old Odeon incorporates a 100-seat cinema, which sits in its own box suspended above the Kitchen restaurant and bar. The lofty lobby between the extension and the old Odeon provides a circulation space, which can be used for performances or informal film screenings. A temporary screen can be lowered from the old proscenium arch. The bookshelves of the library are distributed throughout the Odeon building at both ground and first floor levels; they are not separated from the restaurant and bar. The dedicated children's library occupies its own separate room near the main entrance at ground floor level, with a story-telling space.

As well as a full programme of theatre and cinema, Storyhouse hosts a range of community activities. The annual Literature Festival appoints a poet in residence, with Lemn Sissay in the role in late 2018. Almost 150 community groups use Story house, and it received over a million customers in the first year after opening.

== Awards ==
- UK Theatre Award winner for The Parent Agency (Best Performance in a Musical for Rakesh Boury & Rebecca McKinnis,co-produced with Scenario Two)
- UK Theatre Award winner for Excellence in Inclusivity
- UK Theatre Award winner in Excellence in Arts Education
- RIBA National Award and North West Award 2018
- LABC Excellence Award
- RICS North west Community Benefit Award 2018: Highly Commended
- Civic Trust Community Impact & Engagement Special Award
- Brick Awards 2017. Winner in Public Building Category
- Building Award 2017. Refurbishment Project of the Year

== See also ==
- Parr Hall, Warrington
- The Brindley, Runcorn
- Lyceum Theatre, Crewe
- Grade II listed buildings in Chester (central)
