= Grade II listed buildings in Chester (east) =

Chester is a city in Cheshire, England. It contains over 650 structures that are designated as listed buildings by English Heritage and included in the National Heritage List for England. Of these, over 500 are listed at Grade II, the lowest of the three gradings given to listed buildings and applied to "buildings of national importance and special interest". This list contains the Grade II listed buildings in the unparished area of the city to the east of the Chester city walls and to the south of the Shropshire Union Canal.

Immediately to the east of the walls is Foregate Street, an extension of Eastgate Street, and many of the oldest listed buildings lie along this street, and there are later buildings in the area to the south of the street. This area includes Grosvenor Park, which contains a variety of listed structures, including three arches moved from other parts of the city. Further to the east is the district of Boughton, which contains some industrial structures close to the canal as well as residential buildings.

Name and location	Photograph	Date	Notes
Cemetery wall 53.19157°N 2.87106°W	—	Early 12th century	The area surrounded by the wall originated as the cemetery for the leper hospital of St Giles. Following the demolition of the hospital the cemetery remained in use until the 19th century. The wall is in sandstone, it surrounds an oval area measuring 36 metres (118 ft) by 24 metres (79 ft), and is about 1.6 metres (5.2 ft) high. It contains a stone tablet inscribed with the history of the site.
Arch from St Michael's Church; 53.18892°N 2.88368°W		Late 12th century (probable)	The archway was removed from the church when it was rebuilt in about 1849–50 by James Harrison, and has been relocated in Grosvenor Park. It is in red sandstone and is badly eroded.
Arch from St Mary's Nunnery; 53.18902°N 2.88328°W	—	13th century (possibly)	The archway and wing walls were originally in St Mary's Benedictine Nunnery, which has been demolished. It has been moved and re-erected twice, latterly into Grosvenor Park. It is in sandstone and consists of a pointed arch with wing walls containing niches.
Shipgate; 53.18907°N 2.88302°W		13th century (possibly)	This consists of a red sandstone arch. It originally stood at the entrance to the city from the port when this was sited close to the Bridgegate. The arch was demolished and moved here in the 19th century.
Bowling Green wall 53.18851°N 2.88530°W	—	14th century (probably)	The wall is on the west side of the bowling green. It is built in red sandstone, and incorporates buttresses.
70 Foregate Street; 53.19128°N 2.88532°W	—	1571	A small town house, later used as a shop. It is timber-framed with plaster panels, and has a slate roof. The building is in two storeys with a cellar, and has a front of one bay. The upper storey extends over the pavement and is carried on three posts. The ground floor contains a 20th-century shop front, and in the upper floor is a seven-light mullioned and transomed casement window. Above this is a jettied gable with bargeboards and a finial.
47 and 49 Foregate Street; 53.19133°N 2.88654°W		1597	Originally a house, it was rebuilt in its almost original form in 1914 and used as a hotel, then converted into a shop in about 1980. It has a steel frame and is timber-framed with Westmorland slate roofs. The building is in three storeys, and has a three-bay front. In the ground floor are modern shop entrances, and the upper floors are jettied. In the first floor are two oriel windows with a casement window between. The top floor has three casement windows, and the gables have bargeboards and finials.
Boughton Lodge and Cottage; 53.19053°N 2.86371°W		Late 16th or early 17th century	A house and cottage, possibly with a timber-framed core and later alterations. The building is rendered with a slate roof, it is in two storeys, and has a long irregular plan. The house has a doorway with a pointed arch. The windows are a mix of sashes and casements.
44 Foregate Street; 53.19111°N 2.88663°W		1601	Originally built as a house, it was largely rebuilt in a similar style by F. Davies in 1920. It has been a public house, Ye Olde Royal Oak Hotel, then used as a shop. The building is timber-framed with plaster panels, and has a slate roof. It is in three storeys, and has a front of three bays, with a gable over the lateral two bays. In the ground floor is a modern shop front. The top floor and the gable are jettied. There are oriel windows in the left and middle bays, and casement windows in the right bay.
77 Foregate Street; 53.19147°N 2.88548°W	—	Early 17th century	A small house later used as a shop, it is timber-framed with plaster panels and has a tiled roof. It is in two storeys, and has a single-bay front. In the ground floor is a shop front. The upper storey is slightly jettied, and contains a three-light casement window. Above this is a coved jetty.
75 Foregate Street; 53.19147°N 2.88553°W		17th century	Originally a small town house, later restored and used as a shop. It is timber-framed with plaster panels and brick at the rear, and has a tiled roof. The building is in two storeys, and has a two-bay front. The ground floor contains a modern shop front, and the upper floor projects over the pavement, being carried on two posts and a brick pier. In the upper floor is a five-light mullioned casement window flanked by Ionic pilasters. The gable is jettied with bargeboards and a finial.
110 Foregate Street; 53.19158°N 2.88364°W	—	17th century (probable)	Originating as a house, it has been converted into a shop. The building is timber-framed with plaster panels, and has a slate roof. It is in three storeys, and has a front of three bays. In the ground floor is a modern shop front. The upper storeys have four pilasters, and vertical close-studding with only one cross rail. There are two casement windows and, at a higher level, a circular window. At the top of the building is a modillion cornice.
Boughton Hall; 53.19019°N 2.86251°W	—	17th century	Originally a country house, it has been altered and extended, being used later as a children's home, and then as offices. It is built in brick with stone dressings and slate roofs, and has an E-shaped plan. The house is mainly in two storeys, with a three-storey left wing. The windows are sashes, and other features include an oriel window and a circular stair tower.
St John's Cottage; 53.18854°N 2.88607°W	—	17th century (probable)	A detached house, with possibly a timber-framed core, later altered. It is built in brick, partly pebbledashed, and has a slate roof. The house is in two storeys with an attic, and has a five-bay front. There is a small two-storey projection on the front and a doorway with a pedimented case, and a 2½-storey porch at the rear. Most of the windows are sashes, with casements in the gabled half-dormers and elsewhere.
Boughton House; 53.19103°N 2.86966°W	—	Mid- to late 17th century	This originated as a house, was then used as a workhouse, a convent, and offices. The front was added in the 19th century. It is built in brick with a slate roof, and is in three storeys. The entrance front is E-shaped, in five bays, and has a balustrade at the top of the middle bay. The windows are sashes.
Craigside; 53.19103°N 2.86966°W	—	Late 17th century	The house was altered in the 18th and 20th centuries. It is built in brick, the front being stuccoed, and has a sslate roof. The house is in four storeys, and has two gables on the front, the right being the larger. The doorway has rusticated quoins, and the windows are sashes. The garden is terraced, and contains walls with terracotta dressings; these are included in the listing.
71 Foregate Street, 2 Queen Street; 53.19146°N 2.88578°W	—	Early 18th century	Originally a house, later used as a shop, the face on Queen Street was refronted in 1883. It is built in brick with stone dressings, and has a hipped slate roof. The building is in three storeys, and has a three-bay front on Foregate Street. In the ground floor is a 20th-century shop front behind a three-bay arcade. The windows in the upper storeys are sashes under wedge lintels with keystones. On the Queen Street front are a pedimented doorcase, and projecting windows under pedimented gables.
Little Oak Public House; 53.19252°N 2.87525°W		Early 18th century	A public house that later incorporated two houses to the right. The original building is in rendered brick with a slate roof, and is in three storeys. The central doorway is approached by steps and is flanked by two replaced windows. The windows above are sashes. Each former house is in brick, and is in two storeys with a single . Each house has a doorcase, that on the right being pedimented, and the windows are sashes.
Manor House; 53.19076°N 2.86332°W	—	Early 18th century	A rendered detached house with a slate roof, later divided into two dwellings. It is in two storeys, and has a five-bay front. In the central bay is a round-arched doorway with slim columns, and a hood carried on shaped consoles. The right hand bay contains a doorway with a gabled hood. The windows are sashes.
Dee House; 53.18880°N 2.88720°W		c. 1730	This was built as a town house. In 1854 became a Roman Catholic convent, and was expanded by Edmund Kirby, who added a wing and a chapel. There further expansions in about 1900 and in 1929. From the 1970s it was used as offices, but was vacated in the 1990s. It is constructed in brick with stone dressings and a slate roof. Most of the building is in Georgian style, apart from the chapel, which is Gothic Revival.
156 and 158 Foregate Street; 53.19205°N 2.88110°W	—	Mid-18th century	A house in two sections, the east section being rebuilt or refurbished by W. T. Lockwood in 1907. It is built in two section with stone dressings and a slate roof, and is in two storeys. The older (west) section has a Doric doorcase with unfluted half-pillars, a curved pediment with a plain frieze, and a dentil and egg-and-dart cornice. The taller east section has a half-round gable with a cartouche and ball finials. The windows are sashes, most with rusticated wedge lintels and keystones.
6 St John Street; 53.19000°N 2.88805°W		Mid-18th century	A house, later used as offices, in brick with stone dressings, on a rusticated plinth. It is in two storeys with cellars and an attic, and has a symmetrical five-bay front. Eleven steps lead up to a door with a Corinthian-style case containing fluted pilasters, a fanlight and a pediment; there are also Corinthian pilasters on the corners. The windows are sashes. Included in the listing are the bollards in front of the building.
Garden wall and gates, Old Palace; 53.18796°N 2.88614°W		Mid-18th century	The wall is on the south, east and west sides of the garden of the former Old Palace. On the south side, facing the Groves, the wall is in stone, and contains brick gate piers with ball finials and iron gates. The west wall is in stone and brick, and the east wall is in brick with stone copings.
9 St John Street; 53.19032°N 2.88773°W	—	c. 1760	Originating as a house, and later used as an office, it is built in brick with a slate roof. The building is in three storeys, with one bay facing the street, and the entrance front on the left side. The round-arched doorway has an architrave with a blind fanlight. The windows are sashes.
Oddfellows Arms public house 53.19304°N 2.88849°W		1770	The public house has been subsequently altered. It is built in brick and has a slate roof, it is in three storeys, with a later two-storey wing. There is a doorway on Frodsham Street containing a timber doorcase with pilasters and a fanlight. At the top of this front is a plain parapet. On the Victoria Place front are two blocked doorways, two inscribed panels, and a shaped gable. The windows are sashes.
6 Queen's Place; 53.19315°N 2.88697°W	—	c. 1770	A brick house on a stone plinth with a slate roof. It is in three storeys, and has a single bay. The house has a fluted Roman Doric doorcase with a frieze, a pediment, and a fanlight. There is one Palladian window, and the other windows are sashes with wedge lintels.
24 and 26 Queen Street; 53.19251°N 2.88635°W		c. 1770	A pair of brick houses on a stone plinth with a slate roof. They are in three storeys with cellars. The doorways are in paired architraves, and the windows are sashes with wedge lintels and keystones.
100 and 102 Foregate Street; 53.19154°N 2.88373°W	—	Late 18th century	A brick house later used as a shop. It is in three storeys, and has a shop front in the ground floor. There is rendering below the window in the first floor. The windows are sashes with wedge lintels and keystones. At the top of the building is a cornice and a parapet.
7 Queen's Place; 53.19308°N 2.88667°W	—	Late 18th century	A brick house on a stone plinth with a slate roof. It is in two storeys, and has a front of two bays. On the front is a doorway with an architrave and a blocked round-headed opening. The windows are sashes with wedge lintels.
Forest House; 53.19104°N 2.88461°W		Late 18th century	This was built as a large town house, and is in Georgian style. Since the 19th century it has been used for a variety of purposes, and only the central block has survived. This is built in brick with stone dressings and a slate roof. The building is in three storeys with a basement, and has a three-bay entrance front. The central round-arched doorway has a rusticated surround with voussoirs, a triple keystone, and a pediment. The windows are sashes, and there is a circular window in the south gable.
128, 128A, 130 and 132 Foregate Street; 53.19180°N 2.88275°W	—	1777	Originally a row of three houses, later converted into four shops with living accommodation. They are built in brick with tiled and slated roofs, and are in three storeys. In the ground floor are modern shop fronts and a vehicle entry. The windows are sashes with wedge lintels.
9–15 Queen's Place; 53.19300°N 2.88661°W	—	1779	A pair of houses later converted into flats. They are in brick with a stone plinth and a slate roof. The flats are in three storeys, with a two-storey wing to the left. The doorcases have pilasters, a frieze, and a pediment. The windows are sashes with wedge lintels.
2 and 4 Queen's Place; 53.19323°N 2.88702°W		c. 1780	A pair of brick houses on a stone plinth with a slate roof in three storeys. The doorcases are pedimented, and the windows are sashes with wedge lintels and triple keystones.
129 and 131 Boughton; 53.19228°N 2.87305°W		c. 1800	A pair of stuccoed town houses with a slate roof. They are in three storeys with cellars, and have a four-bay front. Between the bays in the lower two storeys are giant pilasters with detailed capitals, and there are plain pilasters in the top floor. Above the middle storey is a cornice. The windows are sashes, and the doorways, approached by steps, are round-headed with fanlights. The walls and railings at the front of the houses are included in the listing.
12 and 13 The Groves; 53.18847°N 2.88381°W	—	c. 1800	A pair of houses expressed as one house, built in brick with a slate roof. The building is in three storeys, and has a front of five bays. There is a central doorcase in Roman Doric style, and the flanking bays are bowed. The windows are sashes, those in the lower two storeys having wedge lintels. There is another Roman Doric style porch on the right side of the house.
Lloyd's Bank; 53.19079°N 2.88837°W	—	c. 1802–03	A bank in the Neoclassical style of Lewis Wyatt, extended in 1897 by T. M. Lockwood. The front is in ashlar sandstone, and the side in brick with stone dressings; the roof is slated. The bank is in two storeys and has a three-bay front. The central bay is wider and projects forward, with four engaged Doric columns in the ground floor. Three steps lead to a doorway in the left bay. The windows are sashes; above the central window in the upper floor is a pediment and along the top of the building is a parapet.
Wesley Methodist Church; 53.18984°N 2.88796°W		1811	The initial design for the church was by Thomas Harrison, and this was completed by William Cole II. The church is built in brick with slate roofs. It has a symmetrical entrance front with a central gable containing a nine-light window, which is flanked by two-storey pavilions. Inside the church are galleries carried on Ionic piers.
Dee Hills House; 53.19180°N 2.87670°W	—	1814	This was built as a country house designed by Thomas Harrison in Neoclassical style, and was later used as offices. It is a stuccoed building with a slate roof, and is in two storeys. The south front of three bays overlooks the River Dee. The central bay is bowed and has a verandah of four Roman Doric columns. Above it is a balcony with wrought iron railings. There is a French window in each storey and at the top is a cornice and a parapet. The entrance (west) front has a Roman Doric porch with pairs of columns and pilasters, and an entablature with triglyphs. The windows are sashes. A large extension was added, possibly in the 1930s.
119 and 121 Boughton; 53.19246°N 2.87420°W	—	Early 19th century	A pair of town houses, later converted into flats. They are built in brick with slate roofs, are in two storeys, and have a four-bay front. A verandah and balcony run across the front, carried on latticed timber supports. On the front of the house are four French windows. The garden wall, originally in sandstone and later partly replaced in brick, is included in the designation.
143 Boughton; 53.19224°N 2.87255°W	—	Early 19th century	A rendered town house with a slate roof. It is in two storeys and has a three-bay front. In the centre a pair of iron columns carry a large oriel window, and to the right is a round-arched entry. The windows are sashes, those flanking the doorway are horizontally sliding. The garden walls and the octagonal gate piers are included in the listing.
145 and 147 Boughton; 53.19221°N 2.87233°W	—	Early 19th century	A pair of small rendered town houses with a slate roof. They are two storeys, and each house has a central round-arched recessed porch, which is flanked by sash windows on each floor.
1, 3 and 5 Queen's Place; 53.19318°N 2.88671°W	—	Early 19th century	A row of three brick houses with a slate roof. They have three storeys, and each house is in a single bay. The doorcases have pilasters and a fanlight. The windows are sashes with wedge lintels.
14–17 The Groves; 53.18862°N 2.88362°W	—	Early 19th century	A row of four brick houses with a slate roof. They are in two storeys, and each house has a two-bay front. The doorcases are panelled with friezes and dentil cornices. No. 17 has a French window; the other windows are sashes with stone sills and wedge lintels.
Garden Wall, 14 City Walls; 53.18745°N 2.88749°W		Early 19th century (probable)	Most of the garden wall is built in brick with some sandstone. It is about 2 metres (6.6 ft) high.
Grove Cottage; 53.18867°N 2.88258°W		Early 19th century	Originally a house, later used as a café and dwelling, it is a roughcast brick building with a slate roof. It is in two storeys, and has a three-bay front. There is a central doorway flanked by canted bay windows, and in the upper floor are sash windows.
Heath House; 53.18973°N 2.86278°W	—	Early 19th century	A detached brick house with stone dressings and a hipped slate roof. It is in two storeys with a basement, and has a three-bay front. The windows are sashes. Many original internal features are still present.
Richmond Place; 53.19233°N 2.87325°W		Early 19th century	Originally a pair of town houses, later used as offices. They are built in brick, the ground floor being stuccoed, and have a slate roof. The building is in three storeys and has a four-bay front. Running across the ground floor is an Ionic stone verandah with an entablature containing a frieze, a cornice and a parapet of vase balusters. The windows are sashes, and at the top of the building is a cornice with vase finials.
Chester House; 53.19134°N 2.87203°W		c. 1830	A detached, stuccoed brick house with a hipped slate roof. It is in two storeys, and has an almost symmetrical front. It has a timber doorcase with pilasters and a pediment in a slightly projecting central bay. The windows are sashes. On the garden front is a verandah and an enclosed glazed balcony overlooking the River Dee. Brick chambers in the garden and a wall are included in the listing.
Steam Mill; 53.19338°N 2.88001°W		1834	This was built as a warehouse for a seed company, and later converted into offices. It is constructed in brick with Welsh slate roofs. The building has a rectangular plan, is mainly in five storeys, and has a central silo in the form of a tower in Italianate style. The words "Steam Mill" are painted prominently on the north and west faces.
123 Boughton; 53.19237°N 2.87373°W	—	c. 1840	A detached house with a rear wing. It is built in brick with stone dressings and slate roofs. The house has two storeys and a basement, the latter being rendered, and a front of five bays. The windows are sashes, the central window in each storey having an entablature. The entrance is in the rear wing; it is approached by steps and has an Ionic porch with pilasters, an entablature, and a fanlight.
133 Boughton; 53.19225°N 2.87293°W	—	c. 1840	A small stuccoed town house with a slate roof. It is in two storeys and consists of one main bay, with a narrow entrance wing to the left. The doorcase has pilasters and a hood carried on consoles. The windows are sashes, and at the top of the main bay is a pediment gable. The garden walls and the octagonal gate piers are included in the listing.
20, 21 and 22 The Groves; 53.18876°N 2.88293°W	—	c. 1840	A row of three brick houses with slate roofs. They are in three storeys, and each house has a doorway with a fanlight and a cornice. The windows are sashes with edge lintels.
Barrel Well House; 53.19119°N 2.87175°W		c. 1840	Originally a house, later divided into flats, it is built in pebbledashed brick with a slate roof. It has two storeys at the front and three at the rear, which overlooks the River Dee. The entrance front has a projecting central bay containing a doorcase with pilasters and an entablature. The rear (garden) front is in nine bays (seven at the time of listing but since extended) and contains a verandah, above which is a continuous balcony. There are some French windows, but most of the windows are sashes.
Drinking fountain, Grosvenor Park; 53.18910°N 2.88346°W	—	c. 1850	This is constructed in sandstone, and is set into a sandstone cliff. It consists of an arched opening carved in simulation of rusticated voussoirs with keystones. There is also a dish for the use of pets.
Sandown Terrace; 53.19207°N 2.87586°W		Mid-19th century	A terrace of three stuccoed houses in Italianate style. There are two storeys on the entrance front and three at the rear, with a tower containing an extra storeys at each end. The front is in eleven bays, including the towers. On the entrance front are three projecting Roman Doric porches. At the rear is an iron verandah with a balcony. Most of the windows are sashes, with some French windows. The walls and railings are included in the listing.
Summer house and wall 53.19069°N 2.87837°W		Mid-19th century	The summer house is in the form of a tower and is constructed in brick. It is circular and has two loops and machicolated crenellation. The adjoining wall marks the boundary of the nearby property.
Broughton Water Pumping Station and Tower; 53.19385°N 2.87077°W		1851–53	This consists of a water supply pumping ensemble in Italianate style, consisting of a circular water tower, a beam engine house, a boiler house, and a truncated chimney. The water tower is built in brick on a sandstone plinth, and is in three stages with a basement. The boiler house is in a single storey, and the beam engine house has retained the original cast iron entablature with egg and dart moulding.
1–17 Deva Terrace; 53.19065°N 2.87892°W		1850s	A terrace of 17 brick houses with slate roofs in late Georgian style. They are in three storeys, and most have a single-bay front with gables. They have doorcases with pilasters and entablatures. The windows are sashes. The garden walls and steps are included in the listing.
Riverside; 53.18996°N 2.86985°W	—	1850s	A detached house, rendered, and with a slate roof. It is symmetrical and in Italianate style. The doorway is round-headed with a fanlight. There are two bay windows, a French window, and the other windows are sashes. The garden wall is included in the listing.
Wall and railings, Deva Terrace; 53.19047°N 2.87869°W	—	1850s	The wall stretches along the backs of the gardens of Deva Terrace and landing stages on the River Dee. It is in brick with a stone coping, and carries cast iron railings with spearheads. Six cast iron gates lead to the landing stages.
English Presbyterian Church of Wales; 53.19295°N 2.88200°W		1864	The church was designed by Michael Gummow in Neoclassical style. It is built in brick, the entrance front being stuccoed, and has a slate roof. The front is in five bays and has a portico with four Ionic columns, and a dentil pediment over the middle three-bays. There are six bays along the sides, and at the rear is an apse. In front of the church are cast iron railings on a stone plinth.
Billy Hobby's Well; 53.18967°N 2.88031°W		1865–67	This was built as a pumphouse pavilion for the water garden in Grosvenor Park, and was designed by John Douglas for the 2nd Marquess of Westminster. It is constructed in sandstone and stands on a square plinth with canted corners, pointed arches, granite columns, and wrought iron bars. The roof consists of a pointed spire with a finial.
Boundary wall (east), Grosvenor Park; 53.19096°N 2.88013°W	—	1865–67	The boundary wall with its gate piers was designed by John Douglas for Chester City Council and paid for by the 2nd Marquess of Westminster. The wall is in sandstone and the gate piers are granite. The piers are square, rising to octagonal, and have blunt pointed caps.
Boundary wall (north), Grosvenor Park; 53.19065°N 2.88261°W	—	1865–67	The boundary wall with its gate piers was designed by John Douglas for Chester City Council and paid for by the 2nd Marquess of Westminster. The wall is in sandstone and the gate piers are granite. The piers are square, rising to octagonal, and have weathered caps. There are various openings in the wall.
Boundary wall (west), Grosvenor Park; 53.18914°N 2.88484°W		1865–67	The boundary wall with its gate piers was designed by John Douglas for Chester City Council and paid for by the 2nd Marquess of Westminster. The wall is in sandstone and the gate piers are granite. The piers are square, rising to octagonal, and have ornate moulded finials.
Grosvenor Park Lodge; 53.19089°N 2.88186°W		1865–67	The lodge was designed by John Douglas for Chester City Council and paid for by the 2nd Marquess of Westminster. It is in two storeys, the ground floor being in sandstone, and the upper floor timber-framed, with a tiled roof. It has a T-shaped plan, with a single-storey office wing. Its features include bay windows, casement windows, ornately carved bargeboards, and statues of crowned figures.
Main entrance, Grosvenor Park; 53.19101°N 2.88173°W	—	1865–67	The entrance to the park was designed by John Douglas for Chester City Council and paid for by the 2nd Marquess of Westminster. It consists of five piers between which are a carriage entrance, pedestrian entrances, and a screen. The piers are in granite and have octagonal caps. There are also cast iron piers at the entrance to the adjacent maintenance yard.
Wall and steps, Grosvenor Park Terrace; 53.18977°N 2.87978°W	—	1865–67	The wall is in sandstone, and runs along the River Dee, with steps leading down to it. The wall consists of a balustrade of stone slabs with machicolated coping, and contains piers with domed caps.
Welsh Presbyterian Church; 53.19023°N 2.88766°W		1866	The church was designed by W. & G. Audsley. It is constructed with the entrance front in sandstone, and the sides and back in brick, and has a slate roof. The plan consists of a simple rectangle, with an apse at the east end, and a single-storey narthex at the entrance. The narthex has three arches, with octagonal piers at the corners and two granite columns between them. Over it is a large rose window, with a lancet window above, and a cross finial on the gable. The wall and railings at the front are included in the listing.
31 and 33 Dee Banks; 53.18583°N 2.86874°W		1869	A pair of semi-detached houses designed by John Douglas, one for his own use. They are built in red brick with blue brick diapering, stone dressings and a slate roof. The houses are in two storeys, and each house has a three-bay front. The two central bays project forward and are gabled with porches in the angle between these and the outer bays. The lateral bays are also gabled, and the windows are mullioned. At the front of the garden are sandstone walls and gate piers that are included in the listing.
Statue of Richard Grosvenor, Second Marquess of Westminster; 53.18991°N 2.88102°W		1869	The statue is by Thomas Thornycroft and stands at a main crossing point in Grosvenor Park. It consists of a marble figure of the Marquess dressed in the robes of the Order of the Garter and standing on a pedestal of Derbyshire granite.
1–7 Lumley Place; 53.18979°N 2.88657°W		c. 1870	A row of seven almshouses built in brick with slate roofs. They are in two storeys, with a band of decorative brickwork between the storeys. The windows are casements separated by mullions. There are pilasters between each dwelling and at the ends. Above each dwelling is a gable, the outer two gables being wider than the others; the gables contain decorative terracotta panels.
Drinking fountain 53.19181°N 2.87138°W		1872	The drinking fountain is now dry. It is built in sandstone, and is in Gothic Revival style. The fountain has a hexagonal plan, a short spire, and drinking basins. The inscription includes details of the donor and biblical quotations.
St Werburgh's Church; 53.19115°N 2.88233°W		1873–75	A Roman Catholic church designed by Edmund Kirby in French Gothic style with lancet windows. It is built in sandstone with slate roofs, and consists of a nave and sanctuary with an apse in one cell, and aisles with a clerestory.
Presbytery, St Werburgh's Church; 53.19089°N 2.88244°W	—	c. 1875	The presbytery was designed by Edmund Kirby. It is built in red brick with blue brick diapering, is partly rendered, and has Westmorland slate roofs. The building is in three storeys with a basement, and is attached to the church by a single-storey link. Its features include a gable with an oriel window, a dormer with a half-hipped roof, and tall decorative chimneys.
Sewer vent 53.19083°N 2.86389°W		Late 19th century	The sewer vent is in cast iron and is about 9 metres (30 ft) high. It consists of cylindrical column on a moulded plinth carrying a weathervane and a spherical head with four vents. On the top is an ornate finial.
Grosvenor Rowing Club Boathouse; 53.18876°N 2.88226°W		1877	The boathouse was designed by T. M. Lockwood, and is built partly in timber-framing with brick nogging and plaster panels, and partly in brick, with a tiled roof. On the front is a verandah with a balcony above. This is supported by cast iron columns and a moulded post on the corner. Also at the front is a jettied gable with a canted oriel window.
Zion Chapel; 53.19166°N 2.88196°W		1879–80	This was built as a Baptist chapel and designed by John Douglas. It is constructed in brick with stone dressings and a tiled roof. The chapel consists of an undercroft, a church and ancillary rooms and has corner turrets on the west front.
Chapel House, English Presbyterian Church of Wales; 53.19305°N 2.88195°W		1880	Originally a Sunday school associated with the church, later used as an office. It is built in sandstone with a Welsh slate roof, and is in Neoclassical style. The building has two storeys with a basement, and a single-bay front with an open pediment gable. There are three-light windows on in both storeys, and pilasters on the corners.
Bandstand; 53.18791°N 2.88530°W		c. 1880	The bandstand was paid for by Charles Brown of Browns of Chester. It has an octagonal plan, with a sandstone plinth. Eight cast iron columns carry a hipped slate roof with an ornate cast iron finial.
St John's Church Hall; 53.19005°N 2.88517°W		1881	Originally a church hall, later used as an office, it was designed by T. M. Lockwood. The hall is built in brick with terracotta dressings and a tiled roof. It is in one storey and has a single-bay front facing the road. This front has a central pediment with three pilasters and two tall windows. The porch is on the right side, and also has a pediment.
Chester Visitor Centre; 53.18959°N 2.88622°W	—	1882–83	This originated as St John's School, which was designed by E. R. Robson for the 1st Duke of Westminster. It is built in red brick with stone dressings and tiled roofs. The building is expressed as two and three storeys with attics. Its features include shaped attic gables, carved stone panels, casement windows, and a hexagonal timber belfry topped by a cupola with a lead finial and a weathervane.
142 Foregate Street; 53.19190°N 2.88201°W		1884	This was designed by John Douglas as a police station for the Cheshire County Constabulary. It is built in Ruabon brick with stone bands, terracotta and stone dressings, and a slate roof. The building is in three storeys with an attic. On the fronts facing Foregate Street and Grosvenor Park Road are tall stepped gables. In the ground floor are three sash windows, and in the storeys above the windows are mullioned and transomed.
Uffington House; 53.19149°N 2.87774°W		1885	A house built for Thomas Hughes and designed by Edward Ould. It is built in stone and brick with terracotta dressings, and has a tiled roof. The house has three storeys, cellars and an attic. Its features include octagonal turrets with spires and finials, a tourelle, a cast iron balcony, and tall chimneys.
Parker's Buildings; 53.19227°N 2.88409°W		1888–89	A block of flats designed by John Douglas for the 1st Duke of Westminster. They were built for the Duke's employees, and were named after his agent, Cecil Parker. The flats are built in brick and consist of 30 flats in three storeys. There is a three-bay front, and there are five flats along each side.
Screen and gates, Parker's Buildings; 53.19176°N 2.88386°W	—	1889–90	The screen and gates to the forecourt of Parker's Buildings were designed by John Douglas for the 1st Duke of Westminster. They are in wrought iron on a stone plinth. There is a central carriageway and a pedestrian way on each side. The gateposts are in open-work.
117 Foregate Street; 53.19181°N 2.88377°W		1889–90	A house designed by Douglas and Fordham for the 1st Duke of Westminster, and refaced in 1990. It is built in Ruabon brick with stone dressings and diapering and a tiled roof. The building is in three storeys and has mullioned and transomed windows. There are shaped gables with finials on the front and on the left side. The chimneys have spiral-moulded flues.
House of Shelter; 53.18974°N 2.88574°W	—	1889–90	This was built as an almshouse, and later used as an office. It was designed by John Douglas for the 1st Duke of Westminster. The building is in red brick with blue brick diapering and has a tiled roof. It is in two storeys and has a three-bay front. The windows are mullioned or mullioned and transomed with casements; those in the upper floor are in gabled half-dormers with shaped copings and finials. The chimneys have barley-sugar flues.
113 Foregate Street; 53.19177°N 2.88401°W	—	1890–91	A shop which was the remodelling of an earlier building by John Douglas for the 1st Duke of Westminster. It is built in Ruabon brick with sandstone dressings, has tiled roof, and is in three storeys. There is a modern shop front in the ground floor, and sash windows above. At the top of the building is a shaped gable with five finials.
2 City Road; 53.19227°N 2.88178°W		1892	This was designed by T. M. Lockwood for the Liverpool Union Bank, and later used as offices. It is built in sandstone with a tiled roof, and is in the Baroque style of the 16th century. The building is in three storeys with cellars and an attic. It has a canted corner bay flanked by tourelles with copper cupolas. On the Boughton front is a balustrade, a frieze and a pediment with a carved armorial shield.
1 Vicar's Lane; 53.19033°N 2.88481°W	—	1892	A house probably designed by T. M. Lockwood, and paid for by the 1st Duke of Westminster. It is built in red brick with blue brick diapering, stone dressings, and a tiled roof. The building is in two storeys and has a two-bay front. On the front is a two-storey canted bay window with Ionic pilasters and mullioned and tramsomed windows, above which is a shaped gable. The front garden wall and railings are included in the listing.
Campbell Memorial Hall; 53.19194°N 2.87210°W		1894–97	This was built as a church hall for St Paul's Church, with a caretaker's cottage on the right. It was designed by T. M. Lockwood, and is built in brick with stone dressings, and some timber-framing. The hall has a decorative gateway leading to the hall with shaped gables and a cupola bellcote. The cottage has a jettied timber-framed upper storey with a seven-light oriel window.
Old Bank Buildings; 53.19080°N 2.88864°W		1895	Shops and offices designed by T. M. Lockwood. They are built in brick with applied timber-framing and a tiled roof. The building is in three storeys with cellars, and has modern shop fronts in the ground floor. The first floor projects over the pavement and is carried on posts. The top floor and the two gables are jettied with decorative corbels. There is one casement window, the other windows being oriels. On the corner is a timber-framed turret with a cupola.
10–18 Foregate Street; 53.19091°N 2.88796°W		1896	A row of shops and a bank. The original part was designed by T. M. Lockwood, and is in three storeys, the east part being added by W. T. Lockwood, and in two storeys. They are built partly in sandstone, and partly timber-framed, with slate roofs. The features include modern shop fronts, jettied upper floors and gables, a shaped gable, oriel windows, and a Baroque doorway.
East entrance, Campbell Memorial Hall; 53.19175°N 2.87158°W	—	1897	This includes the caretaker's cottage and the east entrance to the hall. It was designed by T. M. Lockwood, and is in two storeys and two bays. The left bay is timber-framed with brick nogging, the upper storey being jettied. The right bay is in brick with stone dressings and a gable with three ball finials. The windows are casements.
Flour mill office 53.19316°N 2.88082°W	—	1897	A former office in brick with stone dressings and a slate roof. It is in two storeys, with the entrance front facing the yard to the east. The building is in Baroque style, with a doorcase having quoins and an arched inscribed lintel. The windows in the lower storey have curved heads, and those in the upper storey are sashes. There is a tall brick parapet with a stone cornice rising as a semicircle in the centre to contain a clock, and surmounted by ball finials.
Well in garden, Walmoor Hill; 53.19194°N 2.87210°W	—	c. 1897	The well was designed by John Douglas in the garden of his house, Walmoor Hill. It is built in sandstone and consists of a rectangular pool, and a front with canted wing walls. It has a finial with a broken statue.
30, 32 and 34 Love Street; 53.19059°N 2.88484°W		1898	A row of three cottages in red brick with blue brick diapering, stone dressings, and slate roofs. The cottages are in two storeys, and each has a gable with bargeboards at the front; in the central gable is an inscribed terracotta panel. Above the doorways are ornate stone lintels. The windows are mullioned and contain casements.
Obelisk Cenotaph to George Marsh; 53.19206°N 2.87330°W	—	1898	The cenotaph is in the form of an obelisk, and is to commemorate George Marsh who was martyred near to the site. It was paid for by Nessie Brown, and unveiled by the mayor of Chester. The structure consists of a polished granite obelisk and plinth on an ashlar freestone base. It is inscribed with details of Marsh's birth and death, and the names of the donor and the mayor.
1–5 Priory Place; 53.19049°N 2.88518°W		1898	A row of five cottages in two storeys. They are built in brown brick with blue brick diapering, stone dressings and a hipped slate roof. The windows are mullioned casements. In the centre of the row is an inscribed terracotta panel, and on the roof is a terracotta finial.
1, 3 and 5 Christleton Road, 2A Tarvin Road; 53.19188°N 2.87099°W		1898–1900	Four shops with living accommodation above designed by Douglas and Minshull in two and three storeys. The ground floors are built in sandstone and Ruabon brick and contain shop fronts, and the upper floors are jettied and timber-framed with plaster panels. The features include a seven-light canted oriel window, and a circular stair tower with a conical spire and a lead finial.
Public baths 53.19071°N 2.88290°W		1898–1901	The swimming baths were designed by John Douglas for Chester City Council. They are built in brick with stone dressings and timber-framing and have slate roofs. The baths have a two-storey entrance and administrative block and a caretaker's flat, with the swimming baths behind.
6–10 Priory Place; 53.19042°N 2.88562°W	—	1899	A row of five cottages in two storeys. They are built in brown brick with stone dressings and a slate roof. The windows are mullioned casements. In the centre of the row is an inscribed terracotta panel, and on the roof is a terracotta finial.
11, 12 and 13 Priory Place; 53.19033°N 2.88596°W	—	1899	A row of three cottages in two storeys. They are built in brown brick with blue brick diapering, stone dressings and a slate roof. The windows are mullioned casements. Each cottage has a quasi-dormer gable.
14, 15 and 16 Priory Place; 53.19049°N 2.88602°W	—	1900	A row of three cottages in two storeys. They are built in brown brick with blue brick diapering, stone dressings and a slate roof. The windows are mullioned casements. Each cottage has a quasi-dormer gable.
17, 19 and 21 Frodsham Street; 53.19202°N 2.88848°W		c. 1900	Built as a shop and warehouse, later used as a restaurant, the front of the building is in Ruabon brick and the roof is tiled. It is in two storeys. In the ground floor are a doorway with a canopy, rows of windows, and a segmental-headed opening. The upper floor contains more windows and a loading bay, and on the roof are three gables. The rear of the building has two wide timber-framed gables.
Milepost, Tarvin Road; 53.19209°N 2.86800°W	—	c. 1900	The milepost is in cast iron and consists of an octagonal post on a plinth 2 metres (6.6 ft) high. It carries a plate inscribed "CHESTER CROSS 1 MILE".
Lombard House; 53.19171°N 2.88297°W		1902	Designed by John Douglas for Prudential Assurance, it is built in sandstone with a tiled roof. It is in two storeys with an attic. There is a Baroque-shaped gable with a finial on the corner between Foregate Street and Bath Street, a similar gable on the Foregate Street front, and a simpler gable on the Bath Street front. The windows are mullioned sashes.
1–11 Bath Street; 53.19149°N 2.88285°W		1903	A row of six cottages designed by John Douglas. They are built in sandstone with slate roofs, and are in two storeys. They have a complex front including two large gables with their upper storeys jettied on corbels, two smaller dormers with shaped gables, three round turrets with conical roofs and two canted bay windows. The windows are mullioned.
The Spinney, 13 Bath Street; 53.19129°N 2.88275°W		1903	A town house designed by John Douglas. It is built in Ruabon brick with terracotta dressings, panels of stonework, and Westmorland slate roofs. The house is in two storeys and has a square plan with a wing to the left. On the front are a round turret with a conical roof containing a hipped lucarne and surmounted by a finial, a high shaped chimney, and an octagonal turret with an octagonal spire and finial. The upper storey is jettied. In the wing are a doorway and a jettied dormer with a casement window.
Public conveniences and lodge 53.19191°N 2.88848°W		1904	Designed by John Douglas, the lodge has later had other uses. The building is in two storeys on a corner site, the lower storey being in brick and sandstone, the upper storey timber-framed, and the roof tiled. On the corner are three gabled windows and a tourelle with a cross finial. The windows are casements.
78–94 Foregate Street; 53.19139°N 2.88450°W		1904–05	A departmental store designed by Douglas and Minshull for the Chester Cooperative Society in Baroque style. It was extended in 1914, and converted into a range of shops in the 1980s. The building is in brick with stone dressings, is in two storeys with attics, and has nine bays on Foregate Street with three on Love Street. On the ground floor are modern shop fronts between Roman Doric columns. The upper floor contains display windows, and in the attic are windows in quasi-Palladian and Baroque styles. On the corner of the building is a cupola with a lantern, a domed roof, and a finial.
Ye Gardener's Arms Public House; 53.19156°N 2.86994°W		1907	A public house designed by John Davies and Sons. The front is in sandstone and timber-framing with plaster panels, the right side is rendered, and the roof is of Westmorland slate. The public house is in two storeys with an attic. The upper storey is jettied and contains two canted oriel windows. Above this is a nearly full-width gable with bargeboards and a carved finial.
12 St John Street; 53.18939°N 2.88792°W		1908	The building is in brick with terracotta dressings. It has two storeys with cellars and an attic, and a nine-bay front. Three bays project forward and have a broken pediment. Most of the windows are sashes with architraves. In the area behind the building are parts of the foundation of the Roman fortress wall, which are included in the listing.
Love Street School; 53.19086°N 2.88427°W	—	1909	The school was designed by Harry Beswick, and is built in brick with terracotta dressings and a slate roof. It is in three storeys with and attic on the Forest Street front, and in two storeys on the Union Street side. Its features include gables with pediments, window-heads with voussoirs, and a timber-framed cantilevered bellcote.
Control room, Boughton Water Pumping Station; 53.19365°N 2.87096°W	—	1913	This was built as the diesel engine house for the Chester Waterworks Company. It is in Italianate style, and constructed in brick on a sandstone plinth with stone dressings and a slate roof. It has a rectangular plan, is in a single storey, and has fronts of four and five bays. The doorways and windows are contained in round-arched arcades around the building between which are pilasters. In the west gable is an oculus.
15 Foregate Street; 53.19107°N 2.88812°W		1921	A bank designed by Francis Jones, and extended along Frodsham Street in 1964. It has a steel frame clad in sandstone and timber-framing with plaster panels. The roof is in Westmorland slate. The bank is in three storeys with attics, and has one bay on Foregate Street and five bays along Frodsham Street. The upper storeys and the gables are jettied.
Temple Bar public house 53.19223°N 2.88831°W		1922	The public house is built in brick, the upper storey rendered, and has a tiled roof. It is in two storeys, with two gabled bays facing Frodsham Street. There is a central entrance, with a bow window in each bay, and another entrance on the corner. In the upper storey are casement windows. The gables contain oval windows and elaborate pargeting.
Remains in Roman Garden; 53.18859°N 2.88773°W		Mid-20th century	This is a collection of Roman artefacts that have been revealed during excavations and moved here at the instigation of the city engineer. They include parts of columns, carved stones, and a reassembled hypocaust.
4–10 City Road; 53.19252°N 2.88172°W		Undated	A terrace of four shops and offices designed by T. M. Lockwood. They are built in sandstone, brick, and timber-framing. The building is in three storeys, each unit with a gable. Both upper storeys are jettied, and the middle storeys contain four-light mullioned and transomed oriel windows.

== See also ==
- Grade I listed buildings in Cheshire West and Chester
- Grade II* listed buildings in Cheshire West and Chester
- Grade II listed buildings in Chester (central)
- Grade II listed buildings in Chester (north and west)
- Grade II listed buildings in Chester (south)
