= Shipgate =

Sandstone arch in Grosvenor Park, Chester, England

Coordinates: 53.18907°N 2.88302°W

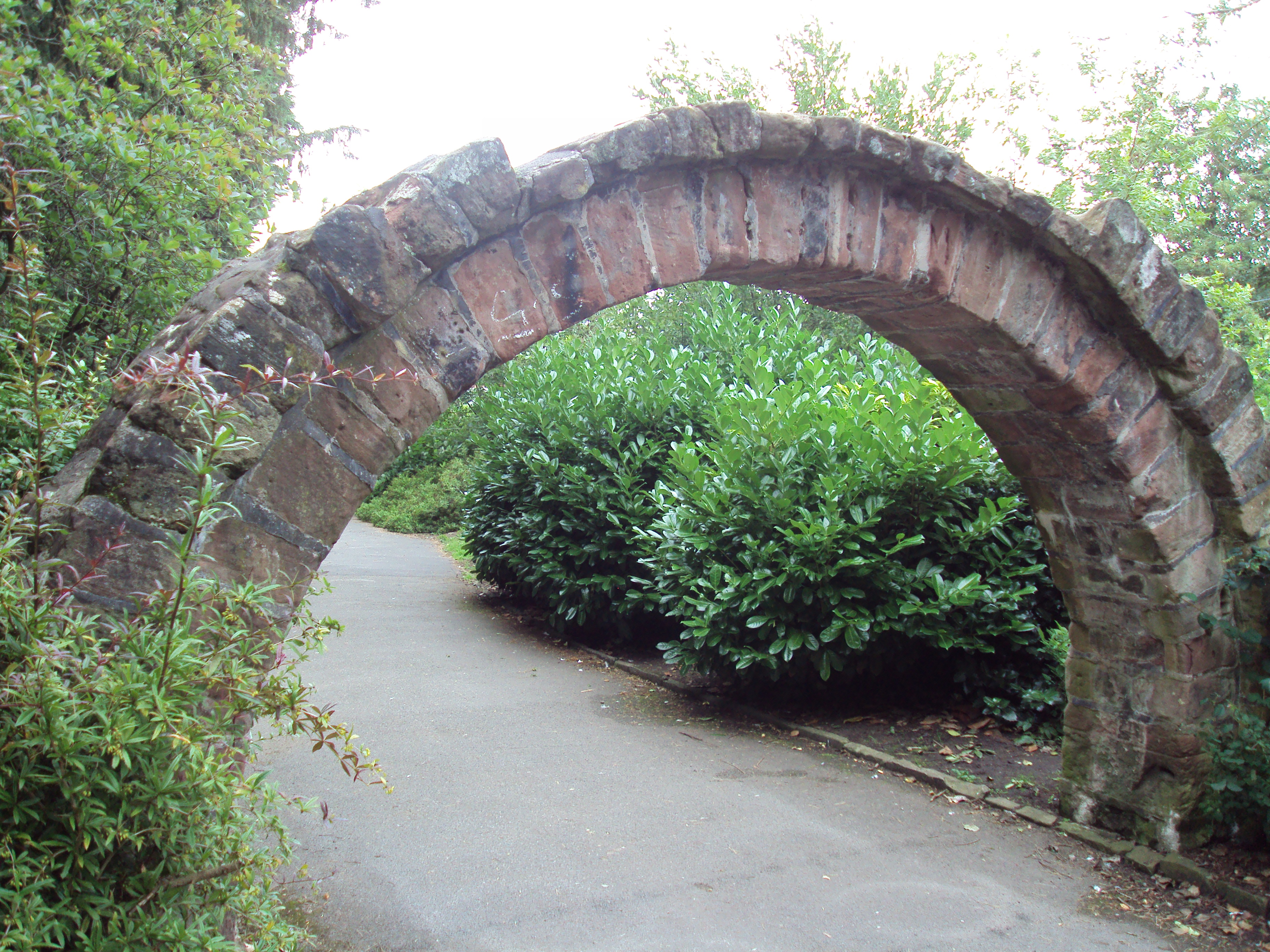
Shipgate in Grosvenor Park, Chester

The Shipgate is a sandstone arch standing in Grosvenor Park, Chester, Cheshire, England. It is recorded in the National Heritage List for England as a designated Grade II listed building.

== History ==
The archway was an entrance to the city from the area of the docks on the banks of the River Dee. It was in the southern section of Chester city walls, west of Bridgegate. The arch was built for a Norman earl in the early 12th century when the walls were extended to the south and west of those built by the Romans to defend the fortress of Deva Victrix. In the early 19th century the gaol at Northgate was demolished and a new gaol was built at the southern extremity of the city. When the gaol yard was added, it necessitated the demolition of the section of the wall that included the Shipgate. The structure was moved in 1831 to the southwestern corner of Grosvenor Park where it now stands.

== Description ==
Shipgate is a round arch built of red sandstone with "simple jambs, minimal wing walls and simple voussoirs".

== See also ==
- Grade II listed buildings in Chester (east)
