= Zion Chapel, Chester =

Coordinates: 53.19169°N 2.88192°W

- Zion Chapel in 2026

- Location in Cheshire
- OS grid reference: SJ 411 664
- Location: Grosvenor Park Road, Chester, Cheshire
- Country: England
- Denomination: Protestant Evangelical

History
- Former name: Grosvenor Park Baptist Chapel

Architecture
- Functional status: Active
- Heritage designation: Grade II
- Designated: 10 January 1972
- Architect: John Douglas
- Architectural type: Chapel
- Groundbreaking: 1879
- Completed: 1880

Zion Chapel, Chester is in Grosvenor Park Road, Chester, Cheshire, England. It is recorded in the National Heritage List for England as a designated Grade II listed building.

The chapel was built in 1879–80 to a design by John Douglas. It was originally a Baptist chapel. It is built in red brick with stone dressings and the roof is of red-brown clay tiles. It consists of an undercroft, a church and ancillary rooms. The west end faces the road and has corner turrets.

In 1980 a congregation called the Zion Tabernacle moved into the former chapel. In 2000 it styled itself Protestant Evangelical.

== See also ==
- Grade II listed buildings in Chester (east)
- List of new churches by John Douglas
