= Forest House, Chester =

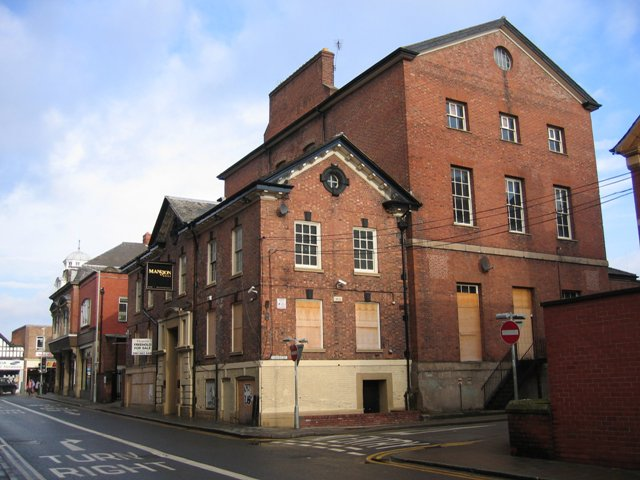
- Forest House

- Location in Cheshire
- 53.1911°N 2.8846°W
- Location: Love Street, Chester, Cheshire, England
- OS grid reference: SJ 410 664

History
- Built: 18th century
- Built for: Barnston family

Site notes
- Architectural style: Georgian

Listed Building – Grade II
- Designated: 10 January 1972
- Reference no.: 1375872

Forest House is in Love Street, Chester, Cheshire, England. It is a former town house that is recorded in the National Heritage List for England as a designated Grade II listed building.

== History ==
Forest House was built as a town house for the Barnston family of Crewe Hill. The date of its construction in uncertain; one source states 1759, others say in the 1780s. It was at one time "possibly the finest Georgian house in Chester", and a prominent landmark in the city. Only the central block now remains. During the 19th century it was used as auction rooms, then a furniture depository, and following which it was used as a night club.

The building was a Wetherspoon pub between 2008 and 2016. It reopened as a Brew House pub in October 2016.

== Architecture ==
The house is constructed in red-brown brick with stone dressings, standing on a stone plinth. It has a grey slate roof. The remaining part of the house consists of two blocks. The block on the corner of Love Street and Forest Street has two storeys and a basement. The west front faces Love Street and has five bays. The lower storey contains a damaged central round-arched doorway, with rusticated jambs, voussoirs, and a triple keystone. To the sides and above the door are sash windows, above which is a broken pediment containing a round window. The south front faces Forest Street. It is in two bays, and also contains sash windows and a broken pediment with a round window. Behind this block rises a larger block of three storeys plus a basement and attic, also with sash windows. The south front has three bays, and a gable containing a round window. The west front has a rectangular chimney of 14 flues. The north front, facing towards Foregate Street, formerly the main front, contains three arched doorways, two of them blocked, more sash windows, and another broken pediment containing a round window. At the first floor level is a frieze containing vase-shaped balusters in three panels. The rear of the building, facing towards the east, is almost unpierced.

== See also ==
- Grade II listed buildings in Chester (east)
