= Grosvenor Park Open Air Theatre =

Outdoor theatre in England, founded 2010

- Interactive map of Grosvenor Park Open Air Theatre
- Address: Grosvenor Park
- Location: Chester
- Coordinates: 53°11′23.9″N 2°52′55.7″W
- Operator: Storyhouse
- Seating type: Terraced benches
- Capacity: 535
- Type: Temporary structure
- Event: Open air theatre
- Surface: Wood chip
- Current use: Summer repertory

Website
- Grosvenor Park Open Air Theatre

Grosvenor Park Open Air Theatre holds an eight week annual repertory season in Chester, United Kingdom. The productions are staged in the round, in a purpose built theatre constructed each summer in Grosvenor Park. The first stage was built in 2010 for productions by the Chester Performs theatre company; Chester Performs transitioned into the Storyhouse theatre company when the Storyhouse facility was opened in 2017, with a selection of Storyhouse's indoor productions being mounted at the Grosvenor Park Open Air Theatre each summer.

== The theatre ==
The company was formed under the name Chester Performs and staged its first production of Much Ado About Nothing in 2010, using a simple wooden platform stage. The next year it moved to using a thrust stage format in a horseshoe shaped theatre; the actors performed on a wood chip base flooring. In 2015 the U-shape auditorium was replaced by a full in the round theatre, with terraced seating, some 40% of which is under cover. There is a range of seating types, some designed as picnic terraces; picnic hampers and drinks are available.

The theatre is dismantled and rebuilt each year in the Victorian Grade II* listed Grosvenor Park. Total seating capacity is 535.

In 2011, the theatre was listed by Countryfile magazine as among the best open air theatres in Britain.

== Storyhouse ==
In 2017, the empty Odeon theatre in Chester was refurbished and opened as a new cultural centre with the name Storyhouse. The name Storyhouse now applies both to the building and the range of activities based there, which includes the in-house theatrical productions formerly known as Chester Performs. Each summer season, the company mounts three productions, which premier in the Storyhouse theatre before moving outside to the Grosvenor Park Open Air Theatre. Grosvenor Park Open Air Theatre also invites a company of 16- to 24-year-olds to stage an original one-act play which is written, produced and performed by its members.

== Productions ==
A complete list of past shows is given on the theatre website, which also maintains a collection of reviews.
