= Boughton Lodge =

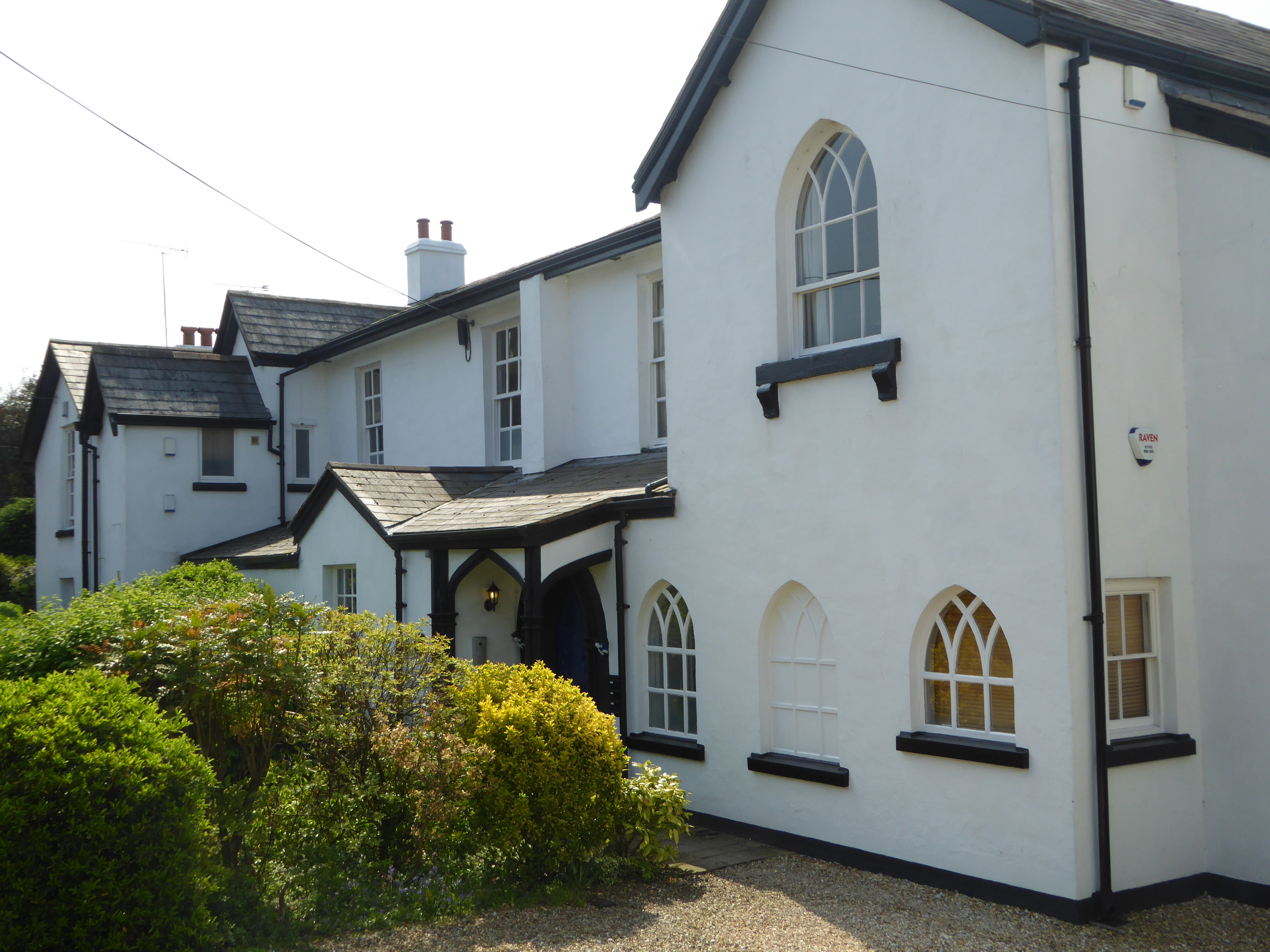
- Front view of building

- Location in Cheshire
- 53.1905°N 2.8637°W
- Location: 58–60 Filkins Lane, Great Boughton, Chester, Cheshire, England
- OS grid reference: SJ 424 664

Listed Building – Grade II
- Designated: 10 January 1972
- Reference no.: 1375792

Boughton Lodge is a house and cottage at 58–60 Filkins Lane, Great Boughton, to the east of the city of Chester, Cheshire, England. It is recorded in the National Heritage List for England as a designated Grade II listed building.

== History ==
The oldest parts of the building date from the late 16th or 17th century, although it was razed to the ground in the 1640s when the Parliamentary army was advancing towards the city during the Civil War. Only traces of timber framing have survived. It shares many identical features with a former vicarage in Church Lane, Little Abington, near Cambridge, which itself dates from the Queen Anne period. This style of architecture, known as English Baroque, was popular during the reign of Queen Anne (1702 -1714) and it is likely that Boughton Lodge as it now exists was constructed around this time. The building has subsequently been converted into four flats, and two cottages.

== Architecture ==
The lodge has a long, irregular plan, and its exterior is rendered. It is roofed in grey slate, and is in two storeys. On the entrance front the doorway has a pointed arch in the style of the 13th century. On the sides are projecting wings with gables, and the cottage extends to the left of the left wing. Some of the windows are sashes, and others are casements under pointed arches. The walls were constructed with hand-made bricks and are 20 inches thick in some parts. The fact that the foundations are sandstone, rather than brick, suggests the existence of a previous building.

== See also ==
- Grade II listed buildings in Chester (east)
