= 78–94 Foregate Street, Chester =

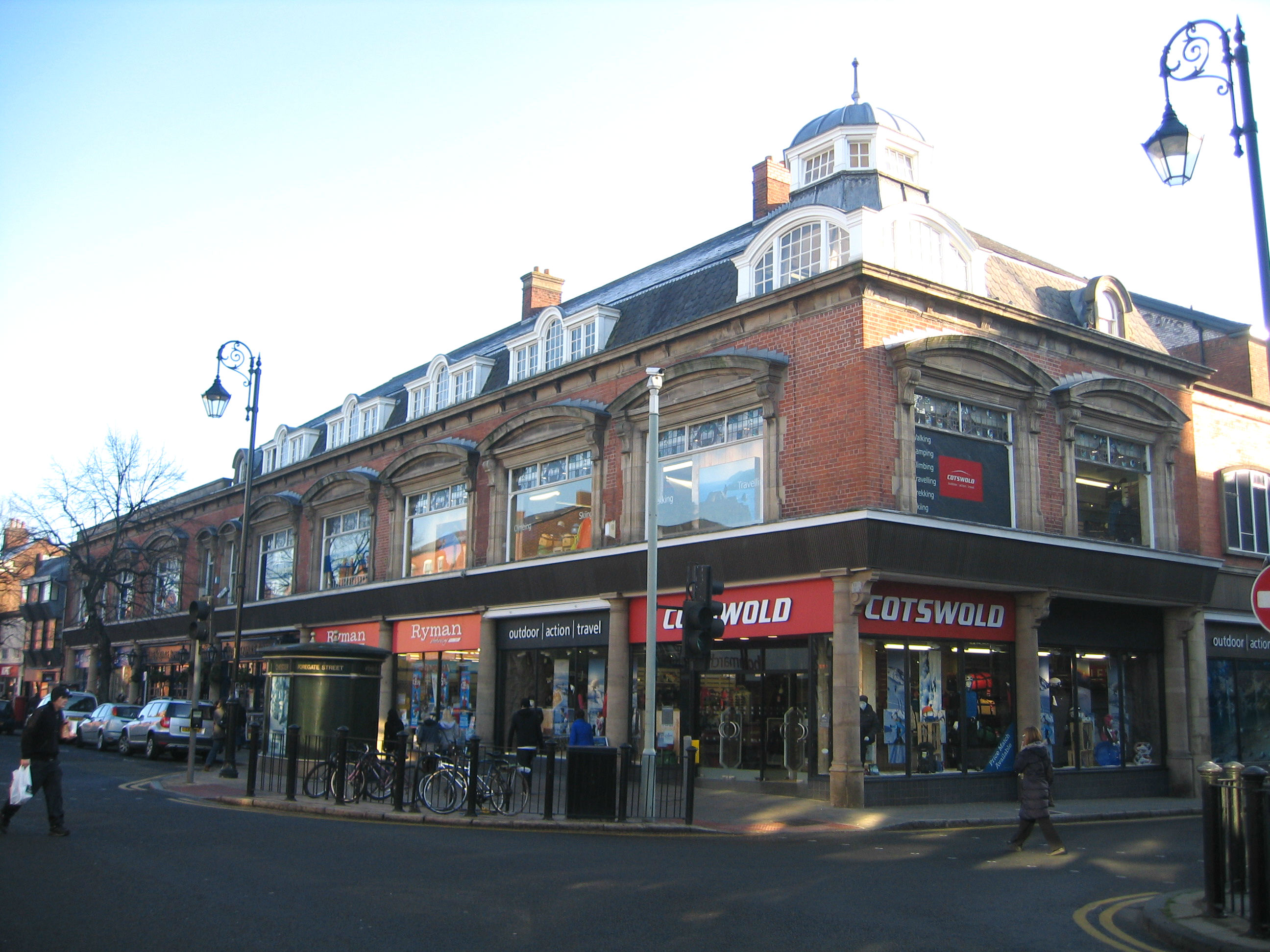
- 78–94 Foregate Street, Chester

- Location in Cheshire
- 53.1914°N 2.8846°W
- Location: Chester, Cheshire, England

History
- Built: 1904
- Built for: Chester Cooperative Society

Site notes
- Architect: John Douglas
- Architectural style: Baroque

Listed Building – Grade II
- Designated: 23 July 1998
- Reference no.: 1375805

78–94 Foregate Street is a range of shops in Foregate Street, Chester, Cheshire, England. It extends round the corner into Love Street. The building is recorded in the National Heritage List for England as a designated Grade II listed building. The building was designed as a department store but has since been converted into separate shops. The style was different from the styles that had previously been used by the architect.

== History ==
The building was designed by the local architect John Douglas as a department store for the Chester Cooperative Society and built in 1904. It was extended in 1914 and during the 1980s it was converted into a range of separate shops.

== Architecture ==
The range of shops is built in brick with stone dressings in Baroque style. It has two storeys plus attics. The building extends as nine bays along Foregate Street and three bays along Love Street. On the ground floor are modern shop fronts between a series of Roman Doric-style columns in cream-coloured stone. In the upper storey are broad display windows with decorated stone surrounds that have arches above them. The windows are transomed and above the transoms the glazing is stained and patterned glazing. Over these windows is a stone frieze with a cornice that is carried on corbels. Above the eaves are more windows. These have timber surrounds and are in quasi-Palladian style. Also above the eaves is a stone-dressed dormer casement window in Baroque style on each face of the building. Over the corner of the building is a lead-roofed cupola with a lantern and a domed roof bearing a tall finial. Beneath the cupola is an arched three-light window on each face of the building.

The department store was designed in a style different from any of the styles formerly used by Douglas and it "shocked the City Council Improvement Committee".

== See also ==
- Grade II listed buildings in Chester (east)
- List of non-ecclesiastical and non-residential works by John Douglas
