= English Presbyterian Church of Wales, Chester =

Church in Cheshire, England

Coordinates: 53.1930°N 2.8821°W

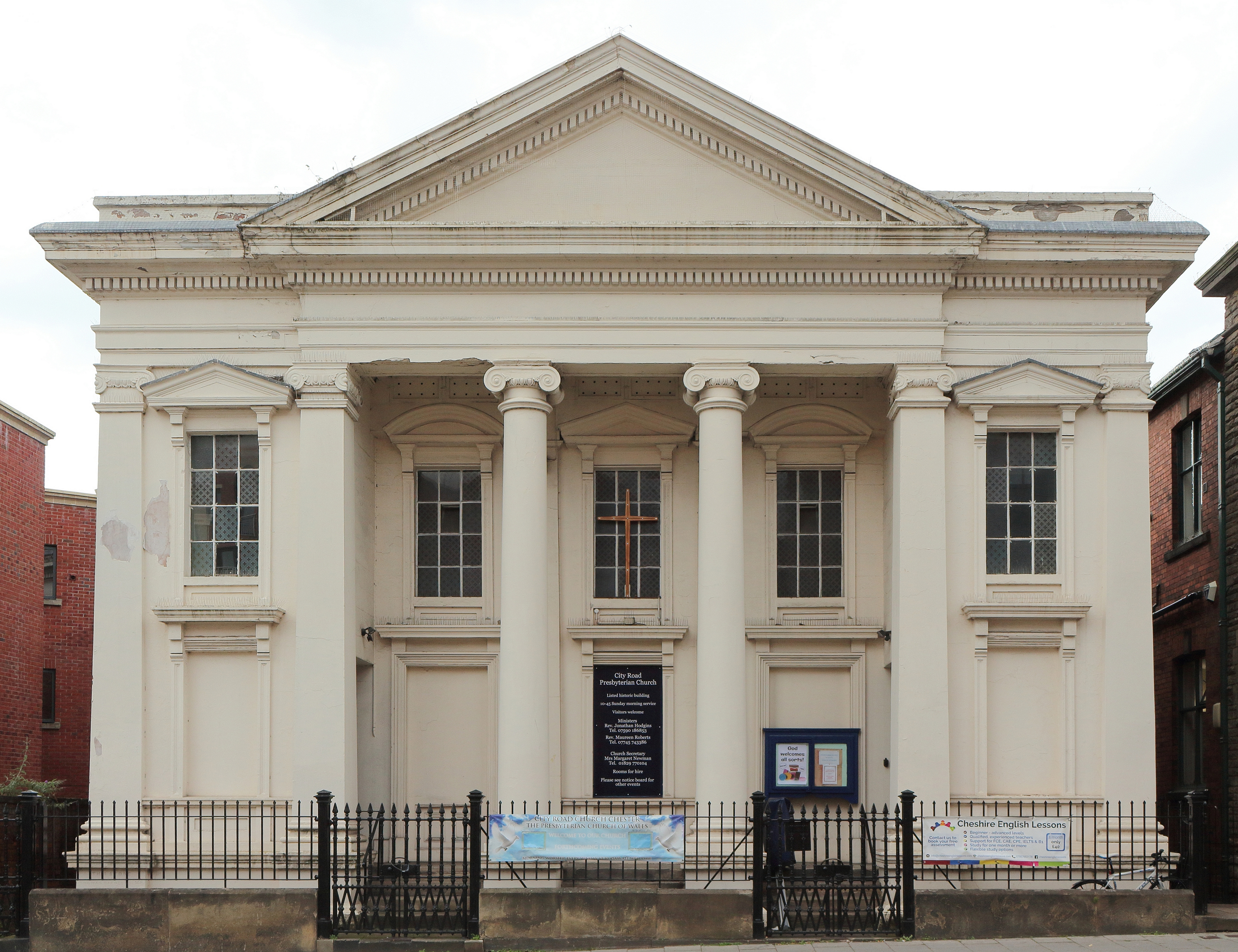
English Presbyterian Church of Wales, Chester

The English Presbyterian Church of Wales is in City Road, Chester, Cheshire, England. The church was built in 1864, and designed by Michael Gummow of Wrexham. It is constructed with a stuccoed front and brick sides, and has a slate roof. The architectural style is Neoclassical. Its entrance front is in five bays; it has a portico with four Ionic columns, and a three-bay pediment. The opposite end of the church is apsidal. The church is recorded in the National Heritage List for England as a designated Grade II listed building.

== See also ==
- Grade II listed buildings in Chester (east)
