= Wesley Methodist Church, Chester =

Coordinates: 53.1898°N 2.8880°W

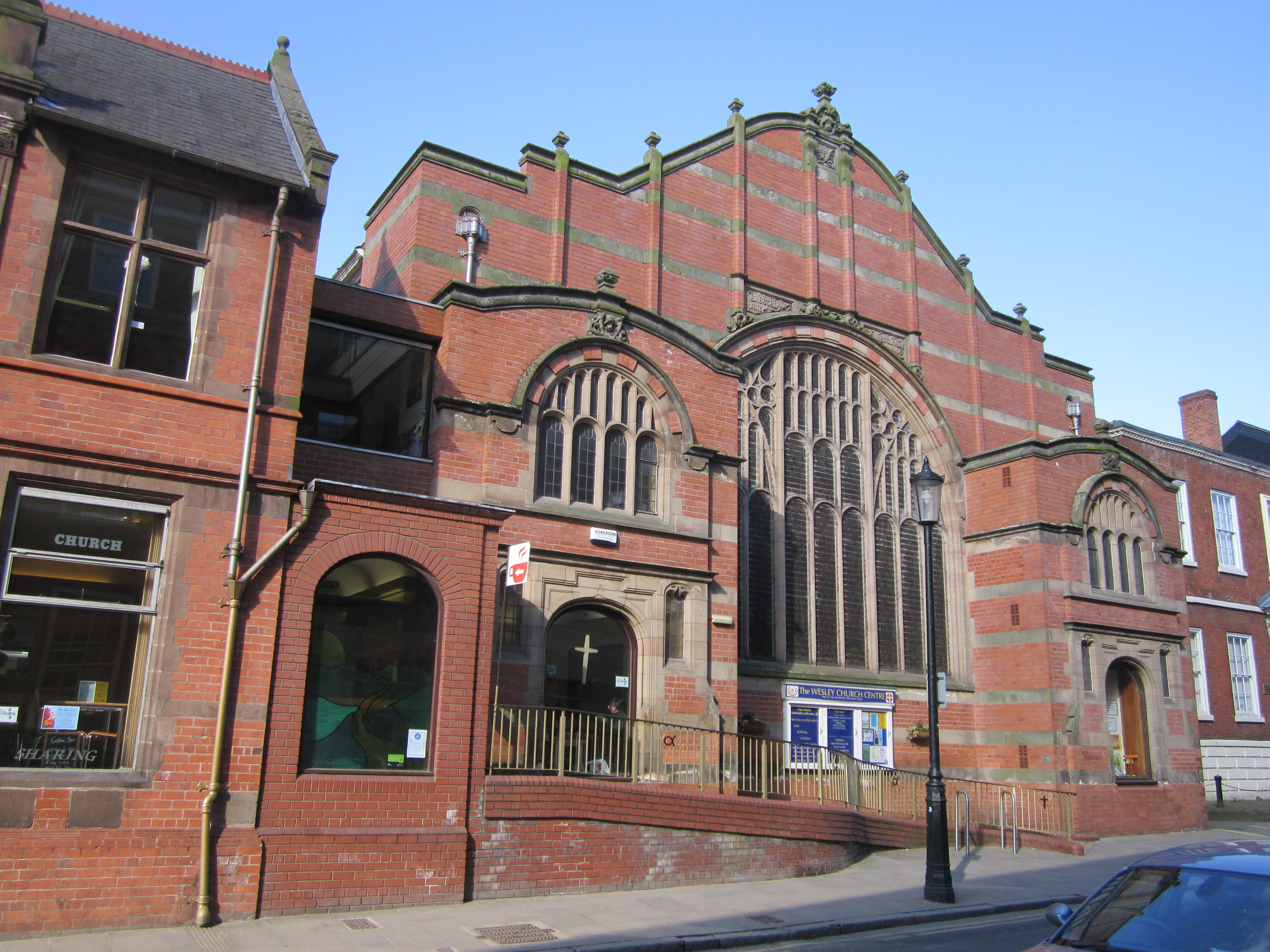
- Wesley Methodist Church, Chester

- Location in Cheshire
- OS grid reference: SJ 408 662
- Location: St John Street, Chester, Cheshire
- Country: England
- Denomination: Methodist
- Website: Wesley Methodist Church

Architecture
- Functional status: Active
- Heritage designation: Grade II
- Designated: 23 July 1998
- Architect(s): Thomas Harrison; William Cole II; P. H. and W. T. Lockwood
- Architectural type: Church
- Groundbreaking: 1811
- Completed: 1906

Specifications
- Materials: Brick, slate roofs

The Wesley Methodist Church is in St John Street, Chester, Cheshire, England. It is an active Methodist church in the circuit of Chester. The church is recorded in the National Heritage List for England as a designated Grade II listed building.

== History ==
The church was built in 1811. The original plan was prepared by Thomas Harrison, but this was inadequate for the full church. The plan was completed by William Cole II, who was also the main contractor for building the church. The original entrance to the church was on the west side, with an apsidal east end facing towards St John Street. In 1906 the church was extended and re-ordered by P. H. and W. T. Lockwood. As a result of this the church was re-orientated, replacing the apse with an entrance front. At the west end a chancel was created, possibly from the original porch. The authors of the Buildings of England series describe the new east end as a "show front in Chester style".

== Architecture ==
The original part of the church is constructed in brown brick, the later parts in red Ruabon brick. The roofs are in slate. The entrance front is symmetrical with a central gable containing a nine-light round-arched window. This is flanked by two-storey pavilions at the corners. Along each side of the church are three tall windows and three lunettes. Inside the church are galleries on the sides that are carried on four-bay arcades with Ionic piers, and a round chancel arch. There is a large stained glass window dating from about 1914 by Gamon and Humphrey, and a war memorial window of 1926 by H. G. Hillier. The organ originally had two manuals and was made by J. J. Binns in 1926. A third manual was added by the same builder in 1948. The organ was cleaned and renovated in 2000 by David Wells.

== See also ==
- Grade II listed buildings in Chester (east)
