= Statue of Richard Grosvenor, Second Marquess of Westminster =

Coordinates: 53.18991°N 2.88102°W

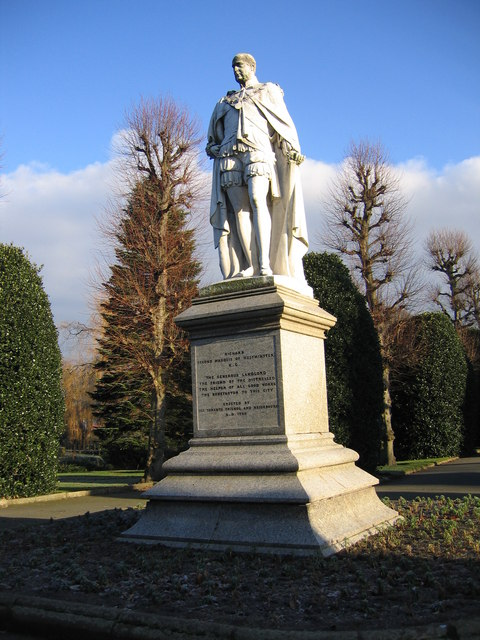
Statue of Richard Grosvenor, Second Marquess of Westminster

The Statue of Richard Grosvenor, Second Marquess of Westminster is in Grosvenor Park, Chester, Cheshire. England. It was designed by Thomas Thornycroft and was erected to commemorate the generosity of the Marquess. The statue was unveiled in 1869, and was paid for by public subscription. It is recorded in the National Heritage List for England as a designated Grade II listed building.

== History ==
Richard Grosvenor, 2nd Marquess of Westminster (1795–1869) was a politician, land owner, and philanthropist. He was a member of the Grosvenor family, whose main country seat was Eaton Hall near Chester. His major benefaction to the city of Chester was the gift of a number of fields near the centre of the city to provide a public park as a place of recreation for its citizens. In addition, the Marquess paid for the design of the park and its laying out by Edward Kemp, a prominent garden designer. The park was opened in October 1867.

The idea of creating a memorial to Richard Grosvenor had been first suggested in 1865 by the Mayor of Chester as "a lasting testimonial to mark the public and private worth" of the Marquess. The Mayor's plan was to create a public square near the centre of the city in which would stand a statue of the Marquess. A public subscription was opened but made little progress until the gift of the park was received. The city council then decided that the statue should be placed in the park, and Thomas Thornycroft was commissioned as the artist. The original intention had been to cast the statue in bronze, but this was changed for a statue in marble. At the time of its creation it was said to have been the largest sculpture to be carved from a single block of marble in Britain. The statue was unveiled on 1 July 1869, but neither the Marquess or his wife attended; it is thought that the Marquess was too ill to attend, (Note: The Marquess died on 31 October 1869.) and his wife had not wanted a public unveiling. The statue cost £3,500 (equivalent to £360,000 as of 2025). Public subscriptions had raised a total of £4,179, and the difference was spent on a portrait of the Marquess for the town hall.

== Description ==
The statue consists of a figure in marble standing on a pedestal of Derbyshire granite. The figure is more than life-size, being about 3.6 metres (12 ft) high. The pedestal is of a similar height. The statue stands at the crossing of the main north-south and east-west axes of the park. It depicts the Marquess dressed in the robes of the Order of the Garter. He is bare-headed, and one leg is slightly advanced. The inscription on the pedestal reads as follows.

RICHARD
SECOND MARQUIS OF WESTMINSTER
K.G.
THE GENEROUS LANDLORD
THE FRIEND OF ALL THE DISTRESSED
THE HELPER OF ALL GOOD WORKS
THE BENEFACTOR TO THIS CITY
ERECTED BY HIS TENANTS, FRIENDS AND NEIGHBOURS
A.D.1869

The statue was designated as a Grade II listed building on 10 January 1972. Grade II is the lowest of the three grades of national listing and is applied to "buildings of national importance and special interest". As of 2012 its condition is described as being "quite severely weathered".

== See also ==
- Grade II listed buildings in Chester (east)

== Notes and references ==
Notes

Citations
