= Old Bank Buildings, Chester =

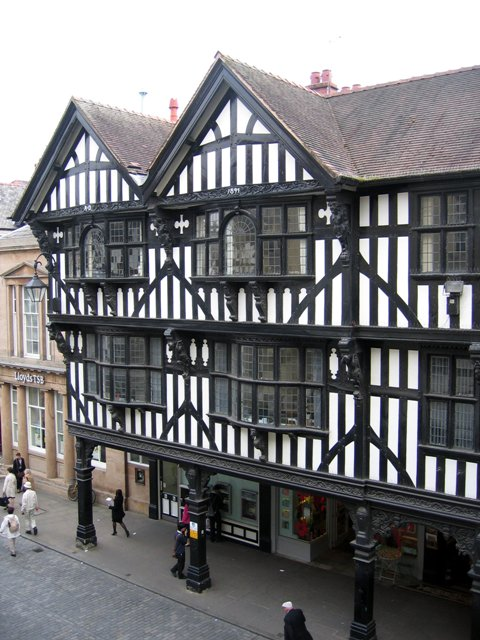
- Old Bank Buildings, Chester

- Location in Cheshire
- 53.1907°N 2.8886°W
- Location: Chester, Cheshire, England

History
- Built: 1895

Site notes
- Architect: T. M. Lockwood
- Architectural style: Black-and-white Revival

Listed Building – Grade II
- Designated: 10 January 1972
- Reference no.: 1375795

Old Bank Buildings is row of shops and offices in Foregate Street in Chester.

== History ==
The buildings were designed by T. M. Lockwood and completed in 1895. They are built in brick with applied timber-framing and a tiled roof. The buildings are in three storeys with cellars, and have modern shop fronts in the ground floor. The first floor projects over the pavement and is carried on posts. The top floor and the two gables are jettied with decorative corbels. There is one casement window, the other windows being oriels. On the corner is a timber-framed turret with a cupola. The buildings were initially used by Lloyds Bank and by Williams Deacon's Bank.

The buildings became the headquarters of the Cheshire Yeomanry just before the First World War. The regiment was mobilised at the buildings in August 1914 before being deployed to Egypt and after the war the buildings were decommissioned and returned to commercial use.

== See also ==
- Grade II listed buildings in Chester (east)

== Sources ==
- Hartwell, Clare; Hyde, Matthew; Hubbard, Edward; Pevsner, Nikolaus (2011) [1971], Cheshire, The Buildings of England, New Haven and London: Yale University Press, ISBN 978-0-300-17043-6
- Historic England, "Old Bank Buildings, Chester (1375795)", National Heritage List for England
