= Parker's Buildings, Chester =

Parker's Buildings
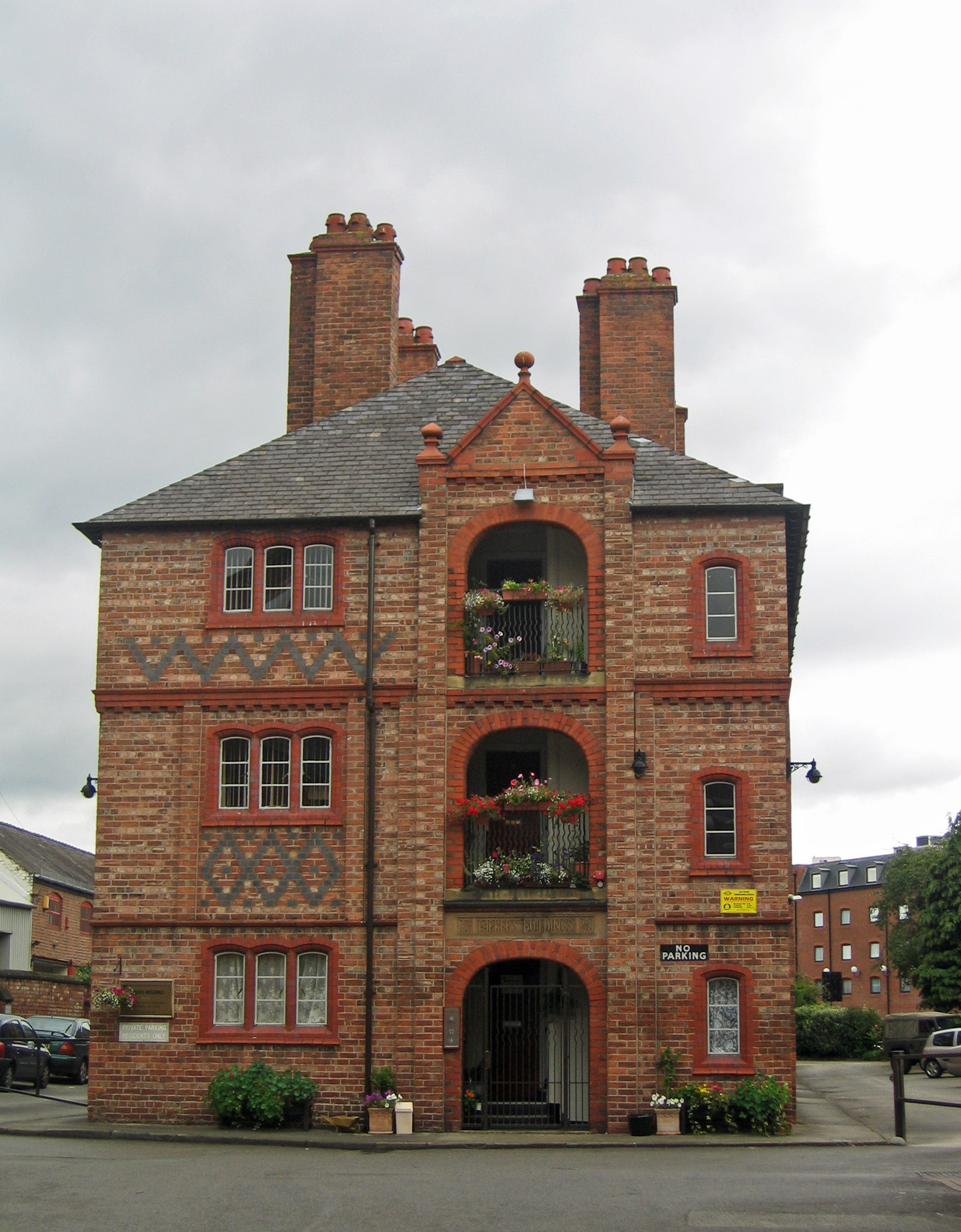
- South face of Parker's Buildings

- Location in Cheshire
- 53.1924°N 2.8841°W
- Location: Foregate Street, Chester, Cheshire, England

History
- Built: 1888–89
- Built for: 1st Duke of Westminster

Site notes
- Architect: Douglas & Fordham
- Governing body: Northern Counties Housing Association

Listed Building – Grade II
- Designated: 23 July 1998
- Reference no.: 1375809

Parker's Buildings is a block of flats off the north side of Foregate Street (numbered 115), Chester, Cheshire, England. It is recorded in the National Heritage List for England as a designated Grade II listed building.

== History ==
The flats were built in 1888–89 for the 1st Duke of Westminster. Their building was supervised by the Duke's nephew and agent, Cecil Parker, and named after him. They were intended for the Duke's employees when they retired from working for him on his Eaton Hall estate. They were designed by the Chester firm of architects Douglas & Fordham and based on flats being built for the working-class in London. To this end Douglas was sent to study the Stalbridge Buildings in London which were being developed by the Improved Industrial Dwellings Company. Douglas' relationship with Parker was never harmonious, and when the block of flats was completed, Parker complained about "poor materials and workmanship". The building still stands and continues to be used as flats, having been refurbished in 1982 by S. J. Lomas for the Northern Counties Housing Association. Douglas' biographer, Edward Hubbard, states that this design is a "rare departure from his usual building types".

== Architecture ==
The building is constructed in common brick, with dressings in red Ruabon brick, and diapering in blue brick. It comprises 30 flats in three storeys. The south side of the building, facing Foregate Street, has three asymmetrical bays. The middle bay contains an open basket arch in each storey. On the ground floor the arch forms an entrance porch; on the upper floors the arches form balconies with wrought iron railings. At the top is a gable with three ball finials. Over the entrance arch is a stone panel inscribed with the date 1889 and "Parker's Buildings". On each floor is a three-light window in the left bay, and a one-light window at a lower level in the right bay. The flats stretch behind this front, with five flats to each storey on each side. Around the building, between the ground and first floor is a string course, and between the upper storeys is a corbel table. Tall brick chimneys rose from the roof. The stairways on the sides are exposed to the exterior, but are contained within the building.

Parker's Buildings is set back from the street. The approach is flanked by two three-storey buildings designed by Douglas and Fordham. Each includes a shop at ground level and above this the buildings are in red brick with blue diapering, stone dressings and shaped gables. Both buildings are listed Grade II.

== See also ==
- Grade II listed buildings in Chester (east)
- List of houses and associated buildings by John Douglas
