= 1–11 and 13 Bath Street, Chester =

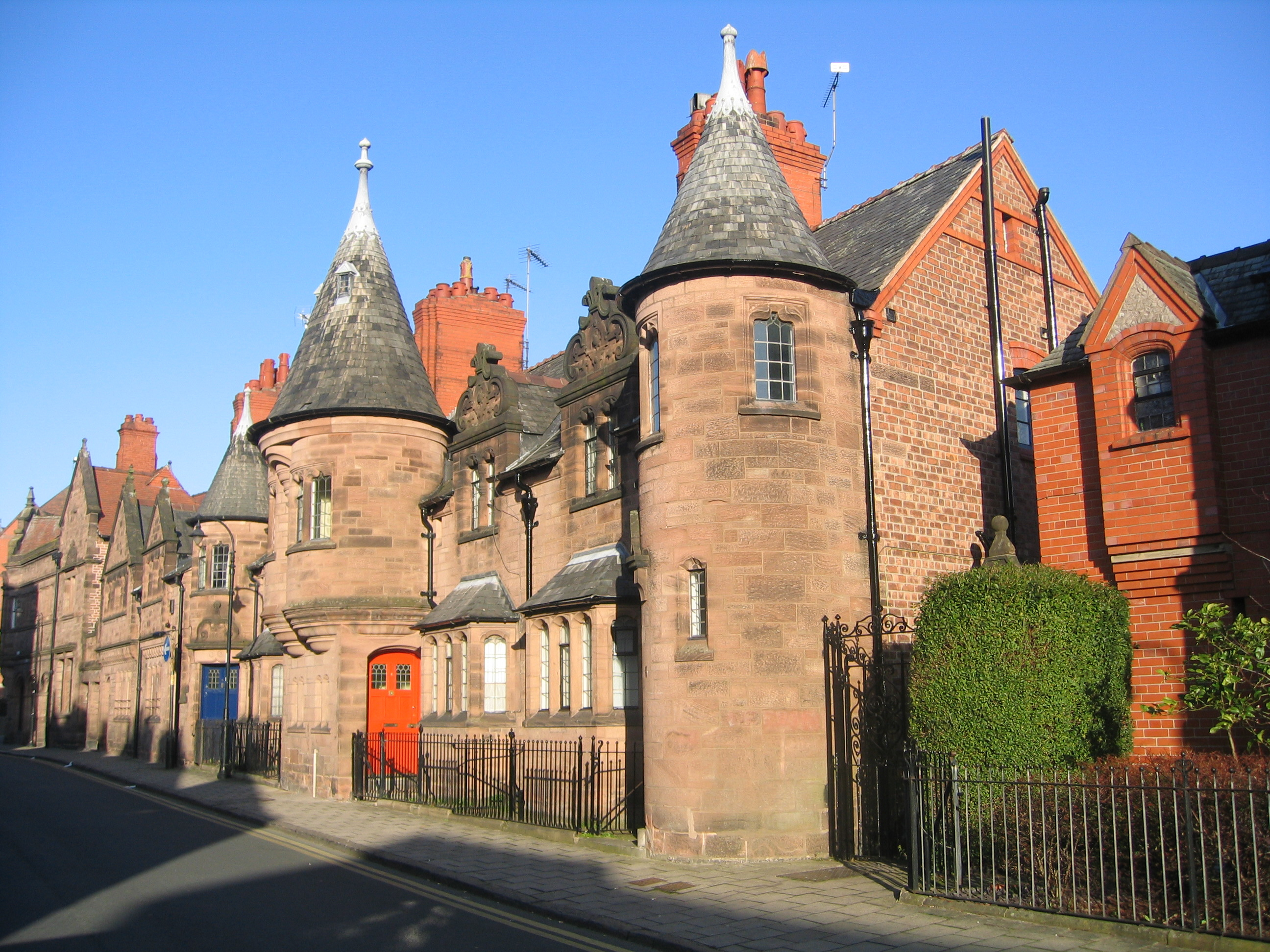
- 1–11 Bath Street, Chester

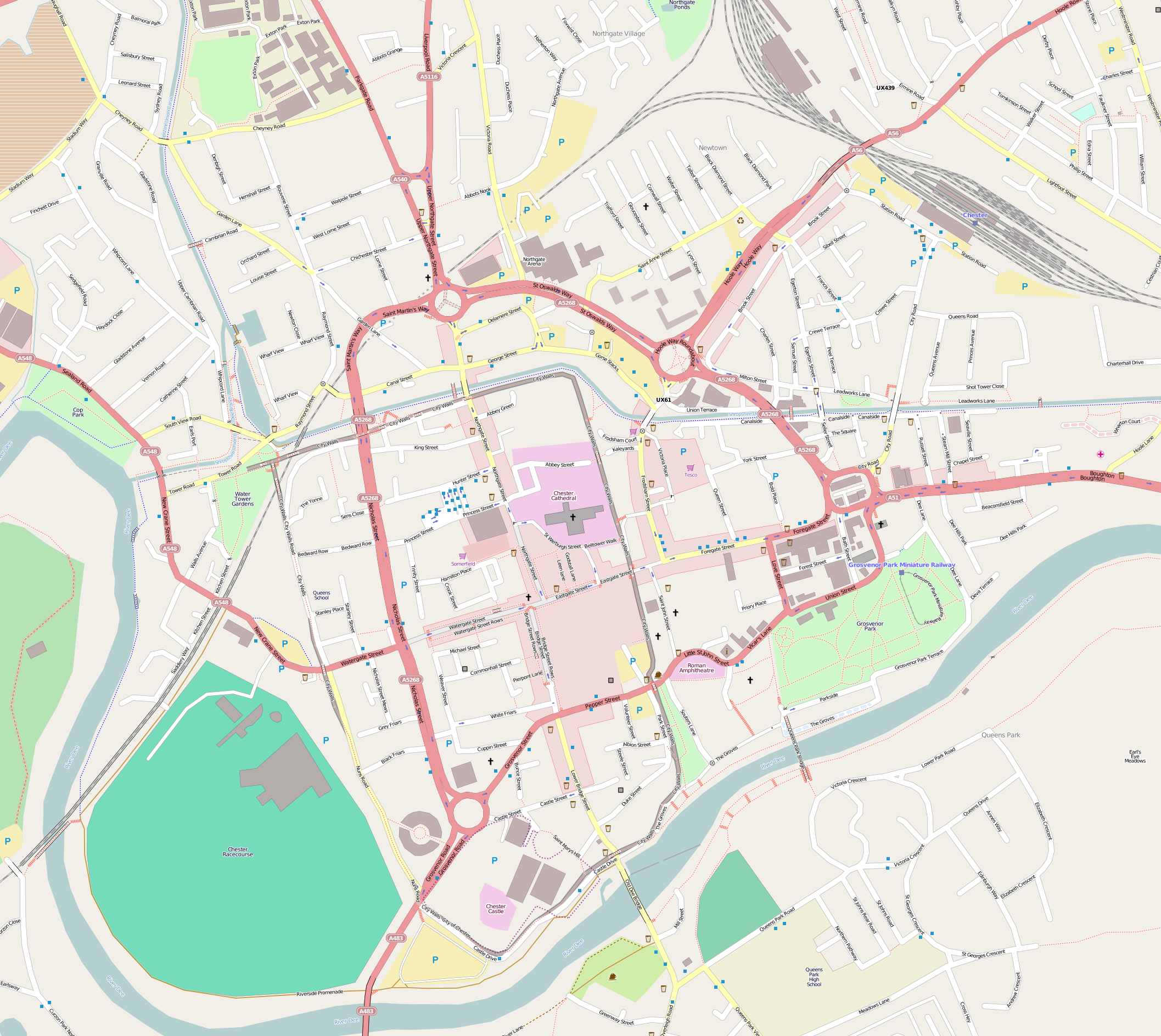
- Location in Chester
- 53.1915°N 2.8828°W
- Location: Bath Street, Chester, England

Site notes
- Architect: John Douglas

Listed Building – Grade II
- Designated: 10 January 1972
- Reference no.: 1375694, 1375695

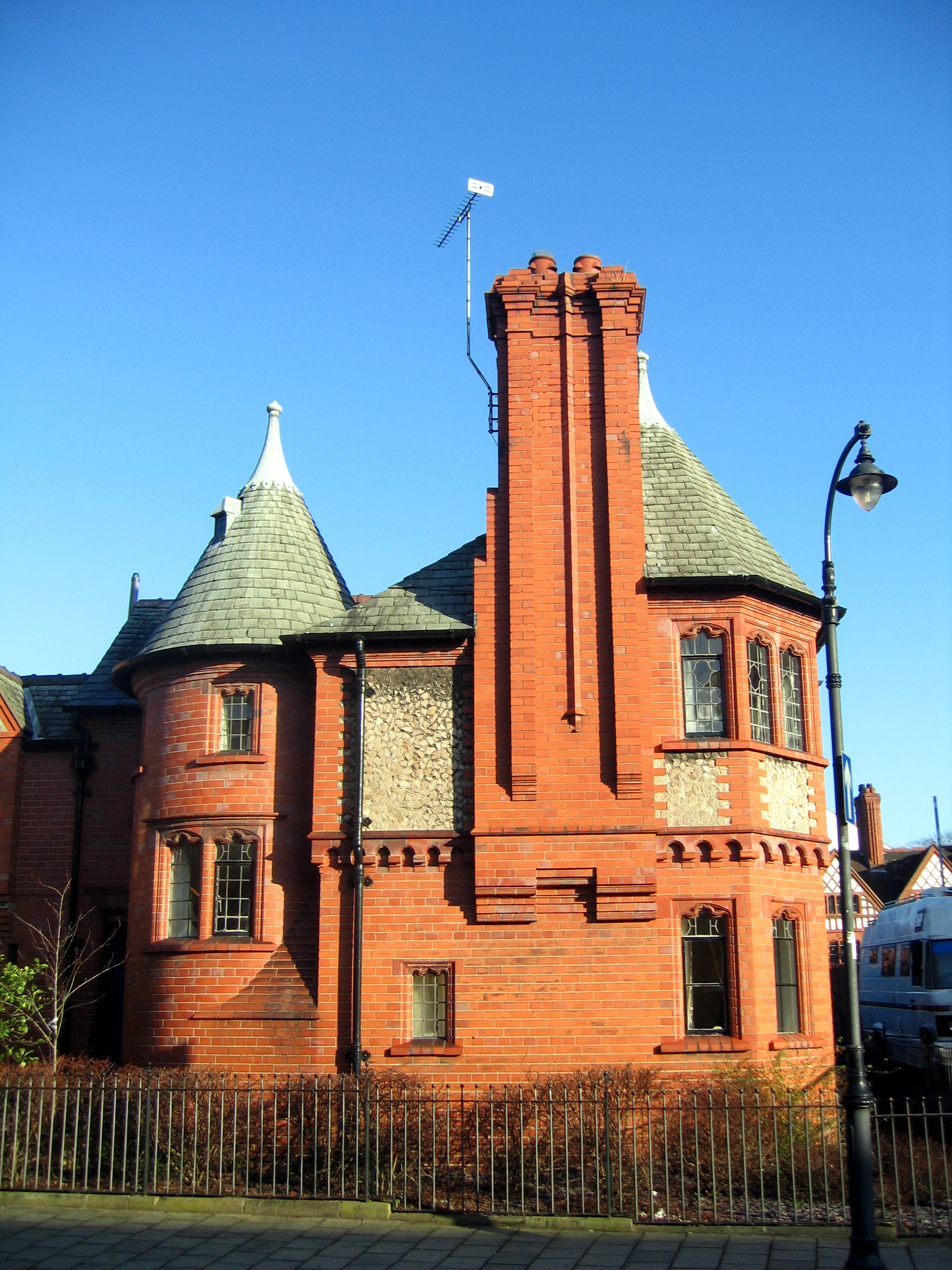
13 Bath Street

1–11 and 13 Bath Street consists of a row of six attached cottages and a separate town house on the east side of Bath Street, Chester, Cheshire, England. Both the row of cottages and the house are recorded in the National Heritage List for England as designated Grade II listed buildings.

== History ==
The buildings were designed by the local architect John Douglas and built on his own land in 1903.

== Architecture ==
Nos. 1–11 stand at the north end of Bath Street. They are built in buff sandstone with grey-green slate roofs in two storeys. The frontage is asymmetrical and includes a variety of features, including two large plain gables with their upper storeys jettied on corbels, two smaller dormers with shaped gables, and three round turrets with conical roofs. The cottages containing dormers are set back from the rest, have bay windows in the lower storey, and small forecourts with wrought iron railings in front. Over the door of No. 11 is a cartouche containing the date 1903. On the gables and on the summits of the turrets are finials. The chimneys and the rear of the cottages are constructed in brick.

No. 13 is at the south end of the street and has two storeys. It is built in red brick with panels containing stonework in the upper storey, and has Westmorland green slate roofs. Its plan consists of a main square part with a wing to the north. On the front of the main part of the house are, from the left, a round turret with a conical roof containing a hipped lucarne and surmounted by a finial, a high shaped chimney, and an octagonal turret with an octagonal spire and finial. The upper storeys of the main part of the house and the octagonal turret are jettied on terracotta corbels. The wing contains the front door and a jettied dormer with a casement window.

== See also ==
- Grade II listed buildings in Chester (east)
- List of houses and associated buildings by John Douglas
