= Grosvenor Park, Chester =

Victorian-era public park in North West England

Coordinates: 53.19052°N 2.88149°W

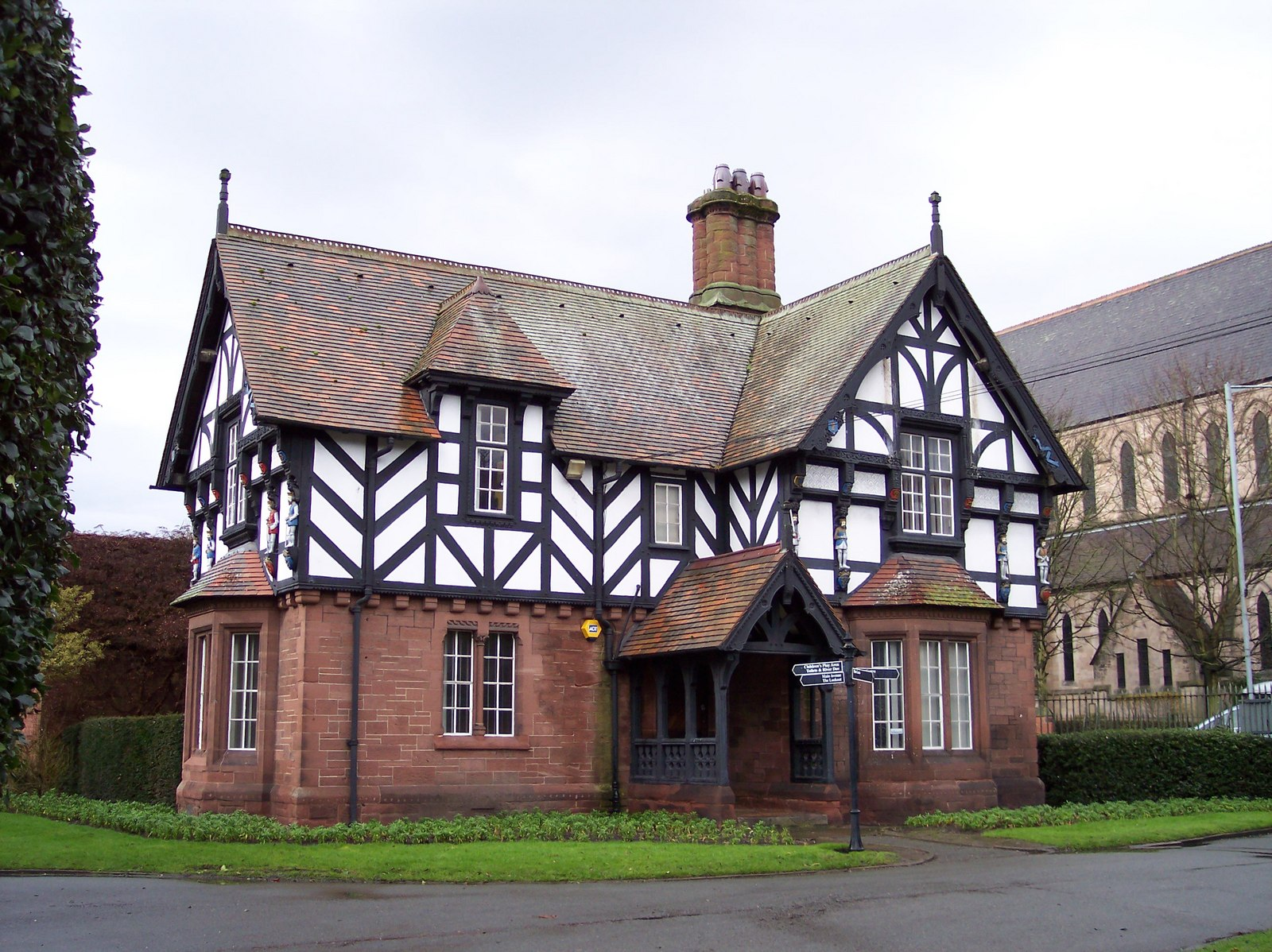
Grosvenor Park Lodge

Grosvenor Park is a public park in the city of Chester, Cheshire, England (grid reference SJ412663). It consists of 20 acres (8.1 ha) of land overlooking the River Dee. It is regarded as one of the finest and most complete examples of Victorian parks in the North West of England, if not nationally. On 22 August 2013 the designation of the park was raised from Grade II in the National Register of Historic Parks and Gardens to Grade II*.

== History ==
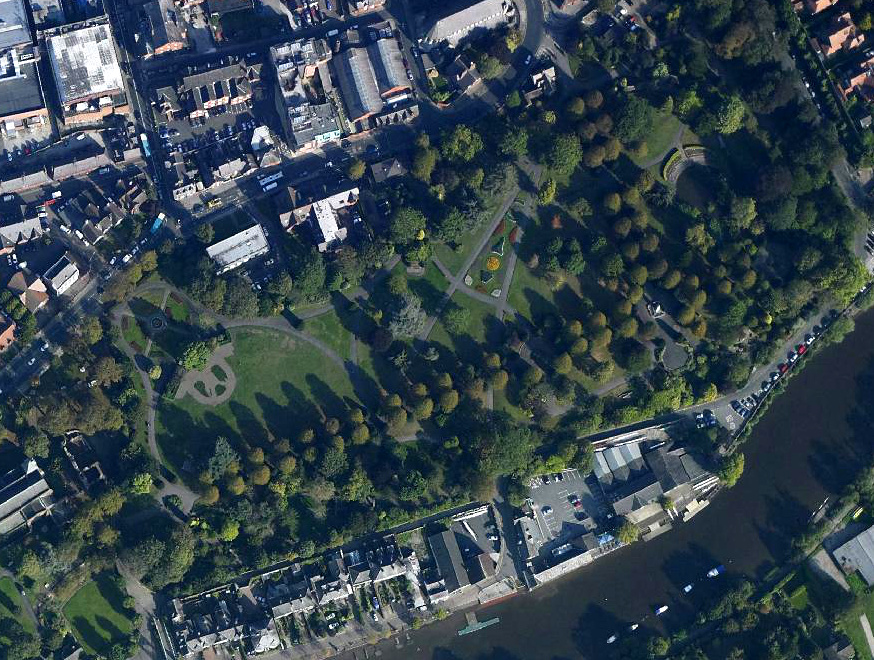
The park as seen from the air

The land, which formerly consisted of fields, was given to the city by Richard Grosvenor, 2nd Marquess of Westminster. The Marquess also paid for the design of the park by Edward Kemp. It was laid out in 1865–66 and opened with great celebration in November 1867 although the Marquess was not able to attend. Grosvenor Park has recently undergone a £3.6 million restoration as part of the 'Parks for People' programme. The park received a £2.4 million grant from the Heritage Lottery Fund, with additional funding from WREN and Cheshire West and Chester Council. The programme aimed to repair and restore some of the original features. A new building named the Activity Zone was built to serve local community activities and the Lodge was refurbished and converted for use as a cafe. The park was reopened in July 2014 by Gerald Grosvenor, 6th Duke of Westminster and descendant of the original benefactor.

== Grosvenor Park Lodge ==
Designed by local architect John Douglas, this was originally the park keeper's lodge. The building has been designated by Historic England as a Grade II listed building. For a time it housed the city council's parks & gardens office. After the 2014 refurbishment of the park, it reopened as The Lodge Cafe. The lodge, together with some of the other structures in the park, are among Douglas's first recorded commissions by the Grosvenor family, and the first known example of his use of black-and-white architecture. The lodge is in two storeys, the lower storey being built in red sandstone and the upper storey being timber-framed with plaster panels. The roofs are of red-brown tiles. On the upper storey are eight carvings which represent William the Conqueror and the seven Norman Earls of Chester.

== Contents ==
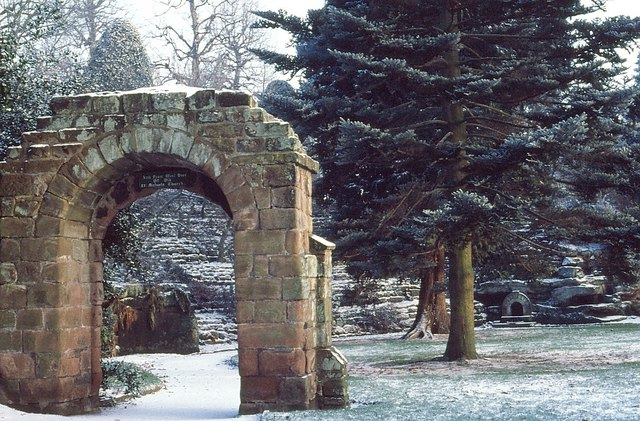
Archway from St Michael's Church with Jacob's Well drinking fountain in the background

In addition to ornamental flower beds, grassed areas, trees and footpaths, the park contains a number of other features. Before the park was established there was in one of the fields a well, Billy Hobby's Well, which was reputed to have magical properties. John Douglas designed a canopy to stand over the site of the well. The canopy is listed at Grade II. Money was raised by public subscription to erect a statue to the 2nd Marquess in 1859. The statue is in white marble and was made by Thomas Thornycroft. The statue was originally surrounded by four guns, two being Boer guns which were captured in the Boer War and the other two were Russian guns which had been captured at Sebastopol in the Crimean War. The guns are no longer present. The statue is listed at Grade II.

In the park are three medieval arches moved from elsewhere in the city, both of which are listed at Grade II. St Mary's Arch with its wing walls dates from around the 13th century and formerly stood in St Mary's Benedictine Nunnery. The Old Shipgate Arch formerly stood to the west of the Bridgegate and was taken down in 1831. The third archway was removed from St Michael's Church. Also in the park and listed at Grade II is Jacob's Well Drinking Fountain consisting of a small stone arch with a drinking fountain for people and a dish for their pets, which is now dry. During the laying out of the park a long line of Roman earthenware water pipes was discovered close to the lodge which used to bring fresh water from Boughton to the Roman fortress. In the 1950s a rockery was constructed on the southern edge of the park with waterfalls, streams and fountains. The main gates of the park, together with other gate piers and sections of the park walls, all designed by John Douglas, are listed at Grade II.

== Activities ==
A number of cultural and horticultural events, including events in the Summer Music Festival, are held in the park. Also in the park is the Grosvenor Park Miniature Railway which was built in 1996 to commemorate the centenary of the Duke of Westminster's railway at Eaton Hall. It has a gauge of 7.25 inches (18 cm) and a circuit of 0.25 miles (0.40 km).

== Grosvenor Park Open Air Theatre ==
During the summer months (July–August) the park hosts the Grosvenor Park Open Air Theatre, a purpose-built outdoor theatre that has been described as a 'Northern alternative to The Globe and Regent's Park'. The theatre, operated by local arts producer Storyhouse (formerly Chester Performs), is the only full-time professional theatre company outside London and first opened in 2010. The Stage described the 2013 production as 'what good alfresco summer theatre is all about'.

== See also ==
- List of parks and open spaces in Cheshire
