= Listed buildings in Hapsford =

Hapsford is a former civil parish, now in the parishes of Dunham-on-the-Hill and Hapsford and Manley, in Cheshire West and Chester, England. It contains three buildings that are recorded in the National Heritage List for England as designated listed buildings, all of which are at Grade II. This grade is the lowest of the three gradings given to listed buildings and is applied to "buildings of national importance and special interest". Apart from he village of Hapsford, the parish is entirely rural. All the listed buildings are domestic, or related to farming.

| Name and location | Photograph | Date | Notes |
|---|---|---|---|
| Manor Farmhouse; 53.26364°N 2.79115°W | | Late 17th century | The farmhouse has subsequently been altered. It is built in rendered brick on a stone plinth with a slate roof. The farmhouse is in two storeys with attics. The windows are casements, with small attic windows in the right gable and at the rear. Inside are two inglenooks. |
| Hapsford Hall; 53.2637°N 2.7904°W | | Late 18th to early 19th century | The country house incorporates an earlier farmhouse. It is built in brick and stone, with stone dressings and a slate roof. It is in three storeys, and a symmetrical three-bay front. At the centre is a projecting embattled stone porch. Most of the windows are sashes, with some casements. |
| Barn, Hapsford Hall; 53.2633°N 2.7901°W | | Late 18th to early 19th century | The barn is constructed in brick on a stone plinth, and has a slate roof. The south front is in five bays. The second and fourth bays are recessed, with air vents arranged horizontally in the upper part. In the other bays are blocked circular pitch holes in the upper parts, and square windows below. On the north front the pitch holes are open, with arched openings below. |

== See also ==
- Listed buildings in Alvanley
- Listed buildings in Barrow
- Listed buildings in Dunham-on-the-Hill
- Listed buildings in Elton
- Listed buildings in Helsby
- Listed buildings in Manley
- Listed buildings in Mickle Trafford
- Listed buildings in Thornton-le-Moors
