= Listed buildings in Elton, Cheshire =

Elton is a civil parish in Cheshire West and Chester, England. It contains six buildings that are recorded in the National Heritage List for England as designated listed buildings, all of which are at Grade II. This grade is the lowest of the three gradings given to listed buildings and is applied to "buildings of national importance and special interest".

Name and location	Photograph	Date	Notes
Rock Farmhouse; 53.2743°N 2.8137°W		Mid-17th century (or earlier)	The farmhouse is partly timber-framed with brick nogging on a stone plinth, and partly in brick with stone dressings. The roof is slated. The house is in two storeys with cellars. The windows are casements. Inside is an inglenook with bressumers and a decorated panel.
Barn; 53.2740°N 2.8136°W	—	17th century	The barn was later converted into workshops. It is in four bays. The barn has a basic cruck core on a stone plinth, which was later encased in brick; three of the crucks remain. Part of the rear wall is timber framed with brick nogging.
Cross Cottage; 53.27450°N 2.81444°W	—	17th century	A sandstone cottage in two storeys, built partly on natural rock. The windows at the front and side are mullioned; at the back are casement windows. The cottage was later altered and additions were made at the rear. The entrance is through a porch at the rear.
Laurels Farmhouse; 53.27402°N 2.81418°W		1705	Additions were made later to the rear of the farmhouse, which is in brick on a stone plinth with stone dressings. It has a slate roof, and is in two storeys with cellars and attics. The windows are sashes, and the doorcase is surrounded by moulded pilasters and a flat cornice.
Farm buildings, Laurel Farm; 53.2739°N 2.8138°W	—	Late 18th to early 19th century	The farm buildings are in brick with slate roofs, and form two sides of the farmyard, with a canted bay between them.
Telephone kiosk 53.27436°N 2.81460°W		1935	A K6 type telephone kiosk, designed by Giles Gilbert Scott. Constructed in cast iron with a square plan and a dome, it has three unperforated crowns in the top panels.

== See also ==
- Listed buildings in Dunham-on-the-Hill
- Listed buildings in Ellesmere Port
- Listed buildings in Hapsford
- Listed buildings in Helsby
- Listed buildings in Ince
- Listed buildings in Thornton-le-Moors
