= Listed buildings in Dunham on the Hill =

Dunham on the Hill is a former civil parish, now in the parishes of Dunham-on-the-Hill and Hapsford and Manley, in Cheshire West and Chester, England. It contains ten buildings that are recorded in the National Heritage List for England as designated listed buildings, all of which are at Grade II. This grade is the lowest of the three gradings given to listed buildings and is applied to "buildings of national importance and special interest". Apart from the village of Dunham on the Hill, the parish is entirely rural. Other than the village church, and a pair of cottages, the listed buildings are, or have originally been, all associated with farming.

Name and location	Photograph	Date	Notes
Smithy Farmhouse; 53.2474°N 2.7940°W		17th century	Additions and alterations were made later to the farmhouse. It is in brick, partly on a stone plinth, and partly on a rock outcrop, and it has a slate roof. The windows are casements.
Farm buildings, Smithy Fm; 53.2476°N 2.7941°W	—	Early to mid-19th century	This consists of a stable with lofts. It is constructed in brick with slate roofs, and contains a stable door, two ground floor windows, and a pitch hole.
Stable range, Smithy Fm; 53.2474°N 2.7943°W	—	Early to mid-19th century	This consists of stables and barns, and is constructed in brick with slate roofs. It contains three stable doors, a plain door, and three loft openings.
Dunhamhall Farmhouse; 53.2500°N 2.7918°W		1696	The farmhouse has since been altered. It is in pebbledashed brick with stone dressings, standing on a stone plinth, with a slate roof. The house is in 2 1/2 storeys, and has a projecting porch. The windows are casements.
Manor Farmhouse; 53.2484°N 2.7933°W		Late 17th to early 18th century	The farmhouse is in rendered brick with stone dressing, and has a concrete tile roof. It has two storeys, attics and cellars. The windows are casements.
Rock Cottages; 53.2512°N 2.7908°W		Late 17th to 18th century	A pair of cottages in brick, partly on a stone plinth, and partly on a rock outcrop, and with a slate roof. They are in two storeys, and have casement windows.
Town Farm Farmhouse; 53.2461°N 2.7940°W		Mid-18th century	A farmhouse in brick and stone, partly on a stone plinth, and partly on a rock outcrop, and with a slate roof. It is in two storeys and a cellar, and consists of a main block and a cross-wing. The windows are casements. Inside is a double inglenook.
Pear Tree Farm House; 53.2483°N 2.7928°W		Late 18th to early 19th century	The house is in brick on a sandstone plinth, and has a roof of concrete tiles. It is in two storeys with a cellar. The windows are sashes.
Horns Farmhouse; 53.2612°N 2.7807°W		Early 19th century	The farmhouse possibly has an earlier core. It is rendered with a slate roof, which is also rendered. The house has two storeys with cellars, and has casement windows.
St Luke's Church; 53.2520°N 2.7924°W		1860–61	The church was designed by James Harrison. It is constructed in sandstone with a slate roof, and consists of a nave with a south porch, and a chancel with north and south vestries. On the west gable is a bellcote. Inside the church is an elaborate gilt cross, which was designed by George Gilbert Scott, and which was formerly in Chester Cathedral.

== See also ==
- Listed buildings in Hapsford
- Listed buildings in Alvanley
- Listed buildings in Barrow
- Listed buildings in Elton
- Listed buildings in Helsby
- Listed buildings in Manley
- Listed buildings in Mickle Trafford
- Listed buildings in Thornton-le-Moors
