= St Laurence's Church, Frodsham =

Coordinates: 53.2905°N 2.7196°W

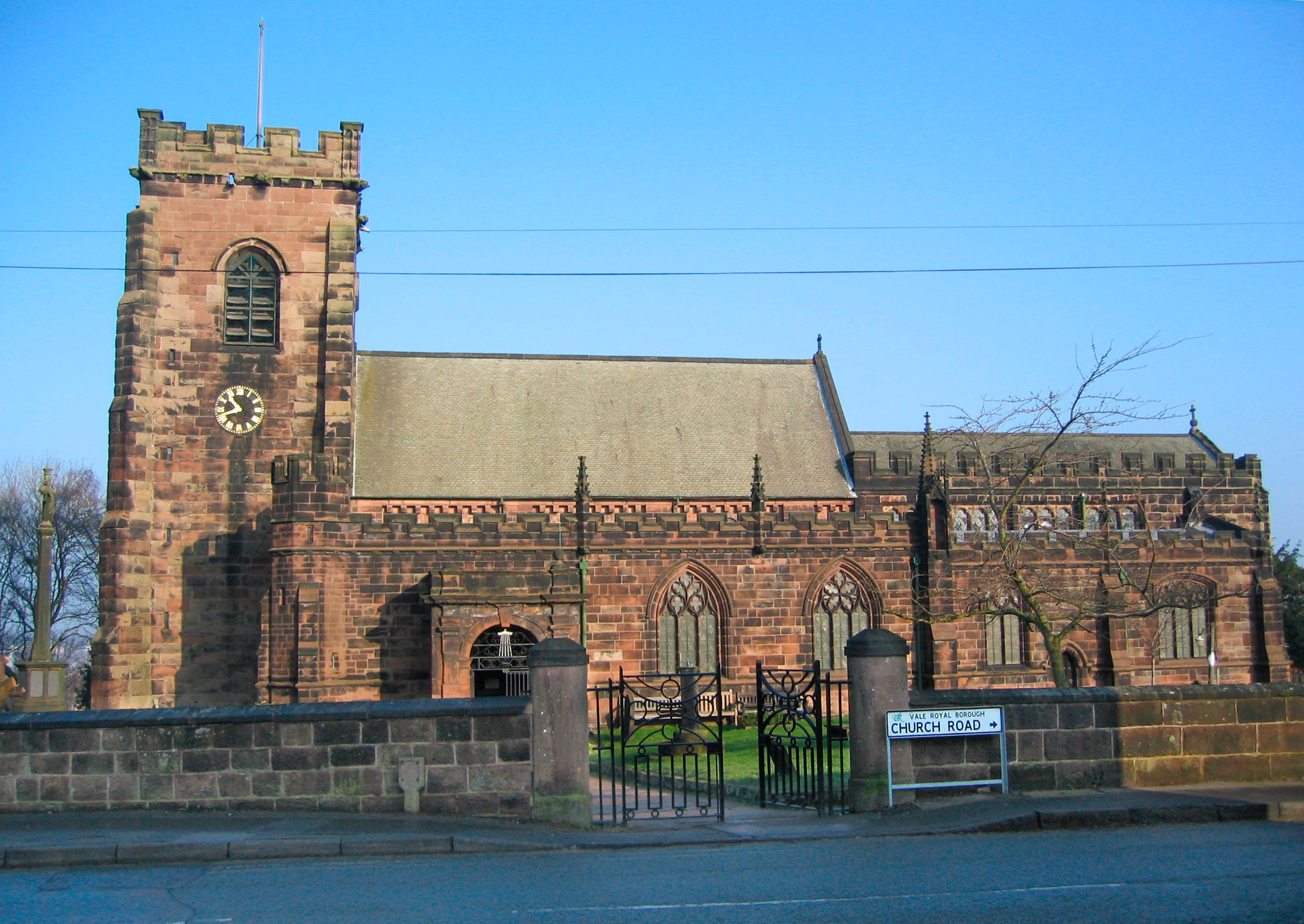
- St Laurence's Church, Frodsham, from the south

- Location in Cheshire
- OS grid reference: SJ 520 773
- Location: Frodsham, Cheshire
- Country: England
- Denomination: Anglican
- Website: slfchurch.org

History
- Status: Parish church
- Dedication: St Laurence

Architecture
- Functional status: Active
- Heritage designation: Grade I
- Designated: 8 January 1970
- Architect(s): Bodley and Garner
- Architectural type: Church
- Style: Norman, Gothic
- Completed: 1883

Specifications
- Materials: Red sandstone

Administration
- Province: York
- Diocese: Chester
- Archdeaconry: Chester
- Deanery: Frodsham
- Parish: Frodsham

Clergy
- Vicar: Rev Elaine Atack

St Laurence's Church is in Church Road, Frodsham, Cheshire, England. The church stands, not in the centre of the town, but in the elevated area of Overton overlooking the town. It is recorded in the National Heritage List for England as a designated Grade I listed building. It is an active Anglican parish church in the diocese of Chester, the archdeaconry of Chester and the deanery of Frodsham.

== History ==
Domesday Book records the presence of a church with a priest in this position. In 1093 the tithes were given by Hugh Lupus to the abbot of St Werburgh's Abbey, Chester. In the 1270s they passed to the monastery of Vale Royal when it was founded by Edward I. Following the dissolution of the monasteries the tithes and advowson passed to the dean and chapter of Christ Church, Oxford. Frodsham is one of the ancient parishes of Cheshire and included the villages of Kingsley, Norley, Manley, Alvanley and Helsby. In the 19th century some of these villages formed separate parishes, Norley in 1836, Kingsley in 1851, Alvanley in 1861 and Helsby in 1875.

The structure of the present church dates from around 1180. It is built from local red sandstone. In the 14th century the chancel was lengthened and the tower was built. In the following century the chancel was further lengthened and increased in height. In the 16th century the north chapel, and probably the south chapel, were added. Considerable rebuilding of the church was carried out by Bodley and Garner between 1880 and 1883. This included removing the galleries and plaster ceilings which had been inserted around 1740.

== Architecture ==
=== Exterior ===
The church is built of red sandstone. It has a symmetrical plan with a tower at the west end, a nave of 3½ bays, north and south aisles, north and south two-bay chapels, and a three-bay chancel with a sanctuary. The north porch is dated 1715 and the south porch 1724. The tower is in three stages and has diagonal west and square east buttresses, a three-light west window, a clock on the north and south faces, two-light belfry windows and a crenellated parapet. The aisles and chancels are also crenellated. In the south wall of the tower have been re-set some Saxon and Norman carved stones. The north chapel is known as the Blessed Sacrament Chapel (it was formerly the Helsby Chapel) and the south chapel is known as the Lady Chapel (formerly the Kingsley Chapel).

=== Interior ===
The interior of the nave is considered to be one of the finest examples of Norman architecture in Cheshire. Although the arcades have been much restored, they still contain some Norman material. In the sanctuary is a piscina adapted from a 14th-century corbel and a sedilia. In the chancel are monuments, mainly to members of the Ashley family who lived in Park Place. The altar rails with twisted balusters date from the 17th century. The three-tier brass candelabra was made in Birmingham in 1805. The pulpit is Victorian and replaces an earlier three-decker pulpit. Hanging on the north wall of the nave is the sounding board from the old pulpit. Beside the pulpit is a memorial to Rev William Charles Cotton, vicar of Frodsham from 1857 to 1879. The font dated 1880 is by Bodley and Garner. The organ dates from 1882-3. The organ case is by John Oldrid Scott. The reredos in the north chapel dates from around 1700, and includes Corinthian columns and pilasters. The stained glass includes a window in the baptistry depicting the Good Shepherd, dated 1917, by Shrigley and Hunt, and three windows from the 1930s by A. K Nicholson. An altar table dated 1678 and the parish chest of 1679 were both made by Robert Harper. Most of the church plate was donated around 1760 by the vicar at that time, Rev. Francis Gastrell. The organ was built by Binns in 1882–83 and rebuilt by the same company in 1923. A further rebuild was carried out in 1982 by Sixsmith. There is a ring of eight bells, six of which were cast by Rudhall of Gloucester in 1734. The other two bells date from 1911 and are by John Taylor and Company. The parish registers begin in 1558, with a break between 1642 and 1661, and the churchwardens' accounts date from 1609.

== External features ==
In the churchyard are three Grade II listed structures. Firstly, there is a war memorial sculpted by the Arts and Crafts designer Alec Miller (1879–1961), dedicated in 1921. Secondly, a sundial dated 1790 consists of a copper dial and gnomon on a sandstone stem standing on a base of three round steps. Finally, a tomb to the memory of the Wright family dating from around 1806 stands near the western gate to the churchyard. It consists of a truncated obelisk on a panelled square plinth in grey stone. The churchyard also contains the war graves of 21 Commonwealth service personnel, 15 from World War I and six from World War II, and the grave of Prince Warabo, the teenaged son of King Jaja of Opobo, Nigeria, who was sent to the former Manor House School in Frodsham but died in 1882.

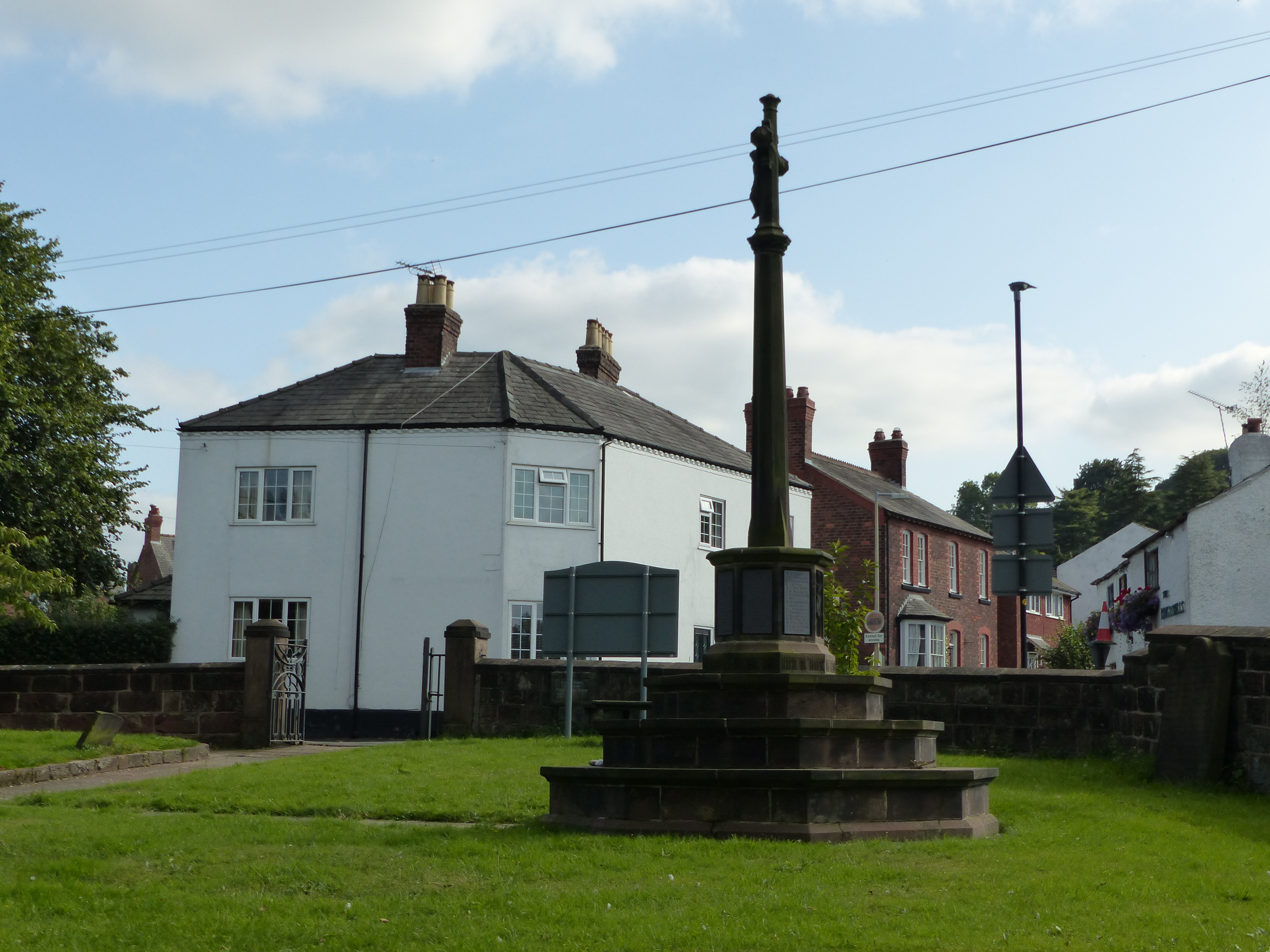
War memorial

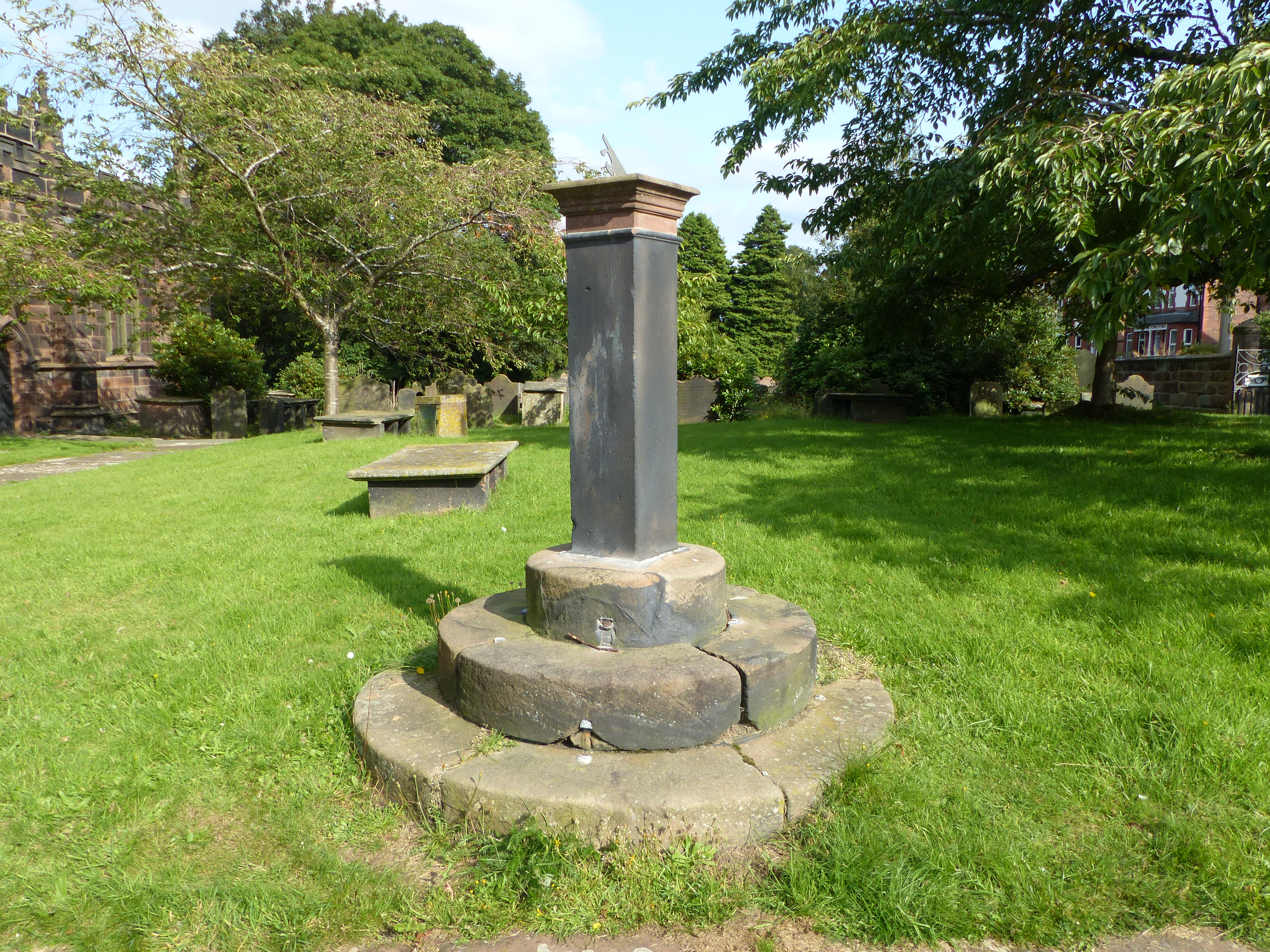
Sundial

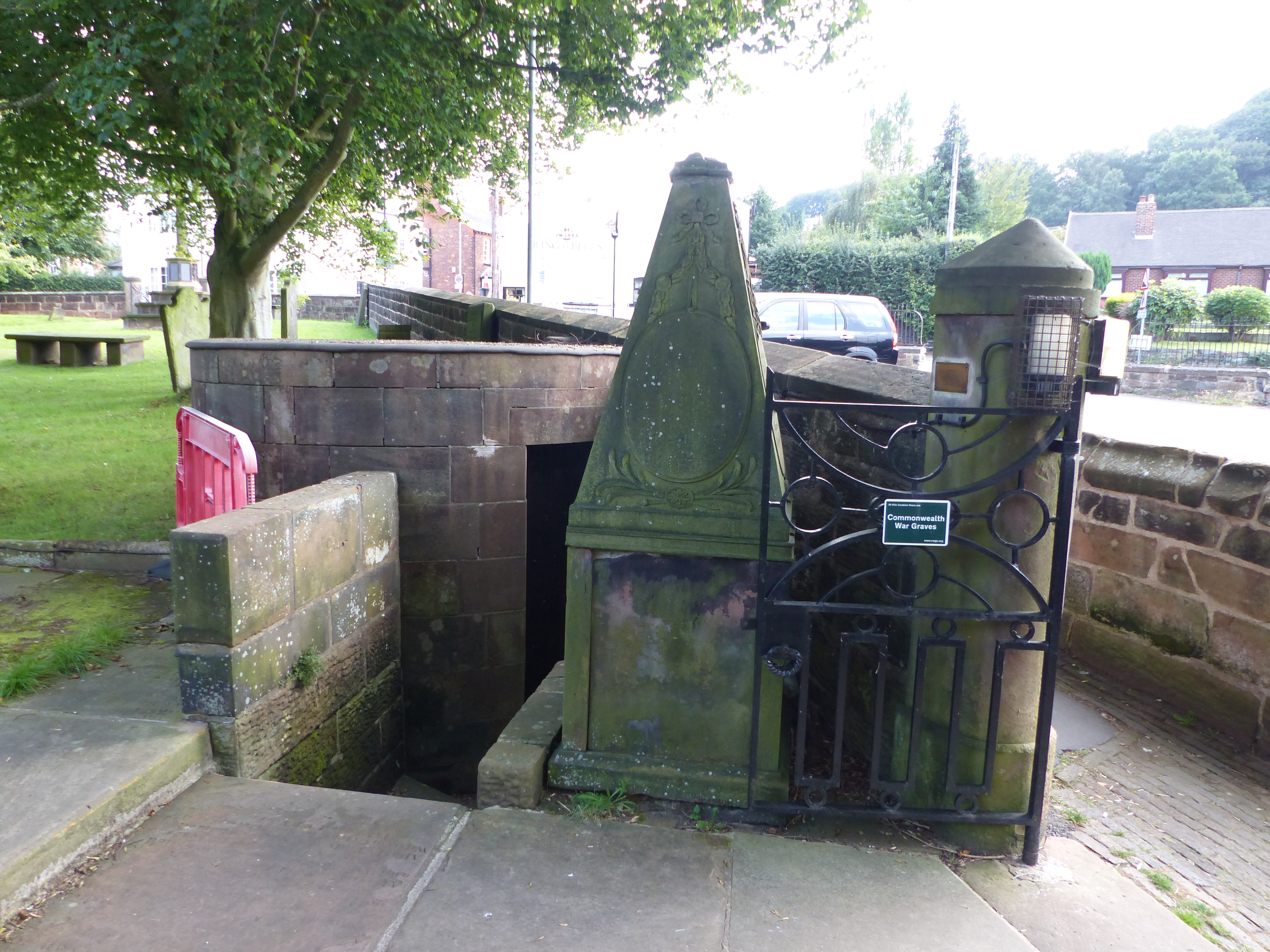
Wright tomb

== See also ==
- Grade I listed buildings in Cheshire West and Chester
- Grade I listed churches in Cheshire
- Listed buildings in Frodsham
- Norman architecture in Cheshire
