= Listed buildings in Ellesmere Port =

Ellesmere Port is an industrial town in Cheshire West and Chester, England. It contains nine buildings that are recorded in the National Heritage List for England as designated listed buildings, all of which are at Grade II. This grade is the lowest of the three gradings given to listed buildings and is applied to "buildings of national importance and special interest". The buildings in the list include houses, a stable, a railway station, and a former cinema.

The below list seems to miss many properties around the Canal basin, and National Waterways Museum. These are listed in this item: https://britishlistedbuildings.co.uk/england/rossmore-ward-cheshire-west-and-chester

Name and location	Photograph	Date	Notes
180 Chester Road; 53.29200°N 2.95374°W	—	Early 18th century	A two-storey cottage with an attic with a slate roof and a stone ridge. It is in brick on a stone plinth, the brick painted with bands between the floors. Inside the cottage is an inglenook, and original oak beams and cupboards.
184 Chester Road; 53.29224°N 2.95293°W	—	1746	A pebbledashed cottage with a slate roof in two storeys with an attic. The ground floor windows at the front are original sashes, and there is an original horizontal sliding sash window in the attic. The first floor windows are replacement casements. Inside the cottage is an inglenook.
78–80 Chester Road; 53.2956°N 2.9562°W	—	c. 1830s	A symmetrical pair of stuccoed houses; No 78 has a slate roof, and No 80 has a roof of concrete tiles. On the front are pedimented gables and canted bay windows. The windows are sashes with stucco architraves.
Stable behind 78 Chester Road; 53.29551°N 2.95648°W	—	c. 1830s	A painted brick stable, partly converted into a garage, but retaining some original features, including a groom's room, two loose boxes, an iron hay rack, and hooks.
354 and 356 Chester Road; 53.2864°N 2.9477°W	—	c. 1835	A pair of stuccoed semi-detached houses with slate roofs. On the front are gables with open pediments, and projecting round-arched porches. The windows have plaster architraves with pediments on consoles.
Ellesmere Port railway station 53.2822°N 2.8963°W		c. 1863	The listed structure consists of the original station building and the attached stationmaster's house. It is constructed in red sandstone with slate roofs, and is in one and two storeys. Its features include coped Dutch gables with ball finials, casement windows in cream stone surrounds, a glazed porch on a sandstone plinth, and a recessed platform canopy supported by a decorated cast iron column.
Christ Church; 53.2861°N 2.8951°W	—	1869–71	Originally an Anglican church designed by Penson and Ritchie, and extended in 1922–25 by Barnish and Grayson, it became redundant in 1994, and was subsequently used as an Elim Pentecostal Church. It is built in sandstone and has a cruciform plan, consisting of a nave, a chancel, transepts, a vestry, and a south steeple with a pyramidal spire.
St John's Church, church hall, walls, gates and lych gate 53.2734°N 2.9363°W		1879–80	The church and the church hall, which are in Great Sutton, are in sandstone with slate roofs. The church consists of a nave, a southwest porch, a chancel, a north vestry, and a southwest turret with a spire. The turret is cylindrical, and has a clock face, lancet bell openings, and a conical spire with lucarnes. The church hall is in Gothic style, it has a T-shaped plan, and on its roof is a slated flèche. The lych gate has stone walls and an oak roof and gates. Stone walls with iron railings extend along the south and west boundaries of the area, and railings along the east boundary. Between the church and the hall is a wrought iron gate with cast iron gateposts.
Queen's Cinema; 53.2815°N 2.8973°W		1912–13	The cinema was built for the Ellesmere Port Picture Palace Company, closing in about 1968, and then converted into a bingo hall. It is constructed in brick, which is pebbledashed at the front. Inside is a small foyer, and a double-height auditorium with a balcony.

== See also ==
- Listed buildings in Capenhurst
- Listed buildings in Frodsham
- Listed buildings in Hale
- Listed buildings in Ince
- Listed buildings in Ledsham
- Listed buildings in Liverpool
- Listed buildings in Neston
- Listed buildings in Puddington
- Listed buildings in Thornton-le-Moors
