= St Luke's Church, Dunham on the Hill =

Coordinates: 53.2520°N 2.7924°W

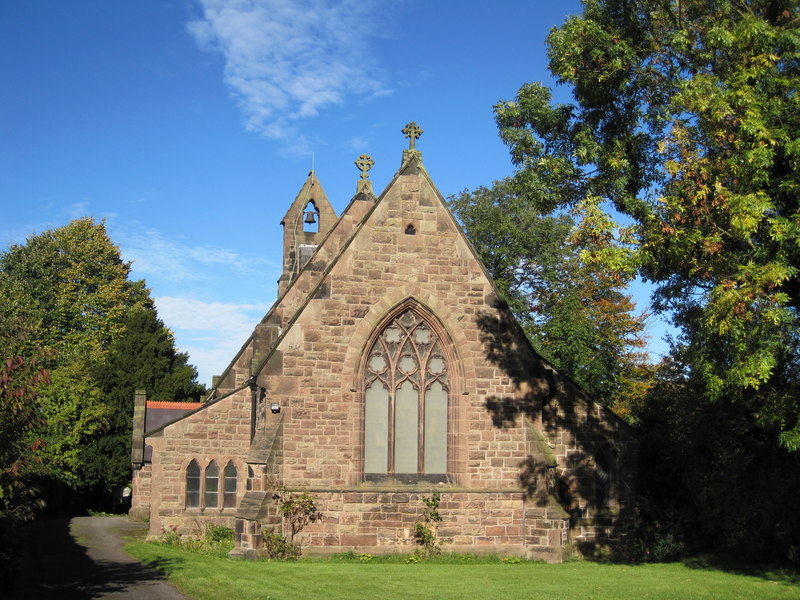
- East end of St Luke's Church, Dunham on the Hill

- Location in Cheshire
- OS grid reference: SJ 472 731
- Location: Dunham on the Hill, Cheshire
- Country: England
- Denomination: Anglican
- Churchmanship: Central
- Website: St Luke, Dunham-on-the-Hill

History
- Status: Parish church
- Dedication: Saint Luke
- Consecrated: 18 October 1861

Architecture
- Functional status: Active
- Heritage designation: Grade II
- Designated: 20 December 1983
- Architects: James Harrison
- Architectural type: Church
- Style: Gothic Revival
- Groundbreaking: 1860
- Completed: 1861
- Construction cost: c. £800

Specifications
- Materials: Sandstone, slate roof

Administration
- Province: York
- Diocese: Chester
- Archdeaconry: Chester
- Deanery: Frodsham
- Parish: St Luke, Dunham-on-the-Hill

Clergy
- Vicar: Revd Noel McGarrigle

St Luke's Church is in the village of Dunham on the Hill, Cheshire, England. It is an active Anglican parish church in the deanery of Frodsham, the archdeaconry of Chester, and the diocese of Chester. Its benefice is combined with that of St Paul, Helsby. The church is recorded in the National Heritage List for England as a designated Grade II listed building.

== History ==
The foundation stone of the church was laid on 22 May 1860. The church was designed by James Harrison. It was consecrated on 18 October 1861, and was originally a chapel of ease in the parish of St Mary, Thornton-le-Moors. The estimated cost was £800 (equivalent to £80,000 in 2025).

== Architecture ==
St Luke's is constructed in sandstone with a slate roof. The architectural style is that of the early 14th century. Its plan consists of a three-bay nave with a south porch, and a chancel with north and south vestries. At the west end is a bellcote. The windows along the sides of the nave have two lights, the east window has three, and the west window four lights. Inside the porch are three niches. There are stone cross finials at the east ends of the nave and the chancel.

Inside the church is a wooden screen with linenfold panelling. The stone font is dated 1863, and consists of an octagonal bowl on an octagonal pedestal. The wooden pulpit is also octagonal. In the church is an elaborate hanging gilt cross that was moved here from Chester Cathedral in 1921. It was designed by George Gilbert Scott and made by Skidmore of Coventry. The stained glass in the east window, dating from about 1878, was made by Shrigley and Hunt and designed by Carl Almquist.

== See also ==
- Listed buildings in Dunham on the Hill
