= Bear Hotel =

The Bear Hotel may refer to:

== United Kingdom ==
- Bear Hotel, Devizes, a historic coaching inn in Devizes, Wiltshire
- Bear Hotel (Oxfordshire), a 13th-century hotel in Woodstock, Oxfordshire, England
- Bear's Paw Hotel, Frodsham, a hotel in Frodsham, Cheshire, England

== United States ==
- Big Bear Frontier, a hotel and cabin resort in Big Bear Lake, California
- Bear Mountain Inn, a hotel on Seven Lakes Drive, Rockland County, New York
