= Helsby War Memorial =

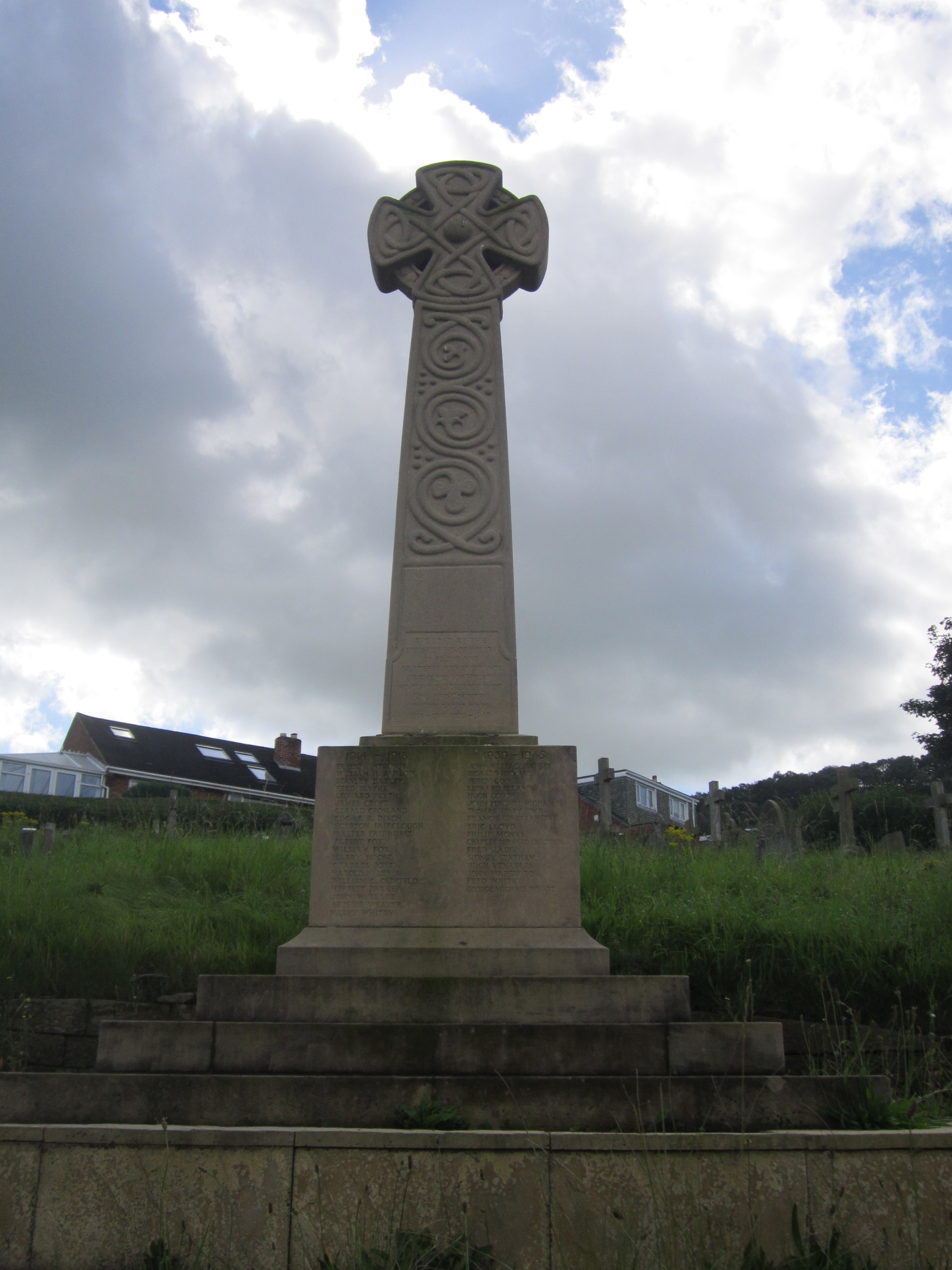
- Helsby War Memorial

- Location in Cheshire
- 53.27753°N 2.76179°W
- Location: Helsby, Cheshire, England
- OS grid reference: SJ4929875886

History
- Built: 1920

Site notes
- Architect: R. H. Lockwood

Listed Building – Grade II
- Designated: 13 September 2016
- Reference no.: 1437912

Helsby War Memorial was built to commemorate the servicemen of Helsby lost in active service in the First World War. It was unveiled in 1920, and the names of those lost in the Second World War were added later. The memorial stands in the churchyard of St Paul's Church in Helsby, Cheshire, England, and consists of a Celtic cross in sandstone on a pedestal and steps. On the shaft of the cross is an inscription and on the pedestal are the names of those lost in the conflicts. The war memorial is recorded in the National Heritage List for England as a designated Grade II listed building.

== Location and history ==
The war memorial is sited in the churchyard of St Paul's Church on a platform overlooking the A56 road. It was designed by R. H. Lockwood, made by W. Heswall and Son, and its cost of £350 was met by the parishioners of the church. The memorial was unveiled on 25 April 1920 by J. Taylor J. P. and by the Revd. E. W. Evans. After the Second World war the names of those lost in that conflict were added. In 2005–06 the memorial was conserved with the help of a grant from the War Memorials Trust, and in 2012 it was refurbished by the local authority.

== Description ==
The memorial is built in sandstone, it is about 5 metres (16 ft) high, and consists of a Celtic cross with a broad tapering shaft. The shaft is on a rectangular pedestal on a base of three steps, the whole standing on a platform. The front of the wheel-head of the cross and the shaft are decorated with complex vine patterns in relief. On the front of the shaft is an inscription, and on the pedestal are the names of to 20 servicemen lost in the First World War, and the 17 lost in the Second World War.

== Appraisal ==
The memorial was designated as a Grade II listed building on 13 September 2016. Grade II is the lowest of the three grades of listing, and is applied to "buildings [that are] are of special interest". The reasons for designating this building are its historic interest "as an eloquent witness to the tragic impact of world events on the local community, and the sacrifice it has made in the conflicts of the 20th century"; its architectural interest as being "an intricately carved cross in the Celtic style"; and its group value with St Paul's Church and the lychgate also in the churchyard, both of which are listed at Grade II.

== See also ==
- Listed buildings in Helsby
