= Dunham-on-the-Hill =

Village in Cheshire, England

Coordinates: 53.248°N 2.801°W

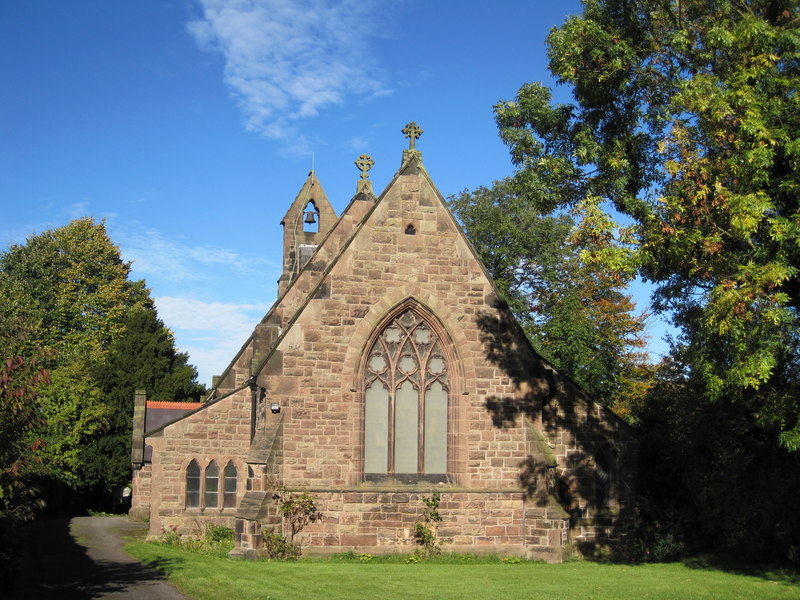
- St. Luke's Church

- Location within Cheshire
- Population: 501 (2011 census)
- OS grid reference: SJ471726
- Civil parish: Dunham-on-the-Hill and Hapsford
- Unitary authority: Cheshire West and Chester
- Ceremonial county: Cheshire
- Region: North West
- Country: England
- Sovereign state: United Kingdom
- Post town: Frodsham
- Postcode district: WA6
- Dialling code: 01928
- Police: Cheshire
- Fire: Cheshire
- Ambulance: North West
- UK Parliament: Runcorn and Helsby

Dunham-on-the-Hill is a village and former civil parish, now in the parish of Dunham-on-the-Hill and Hapsford, in the unitary authority of Cheshire West and Chester, and the ceremonial county of Cheshire, England. It is on the A56 road, approximately 2.3 miles (3.7 km) from Helsby and 6 miles (9.7 km) from Chester. The village is 120 feet (37 m) above sea level, south west of Helsby Hill.

Originally a small hamlet, it has gradually enlarged over the twentieth century, although the village retains a semi-rural character. Council housing was built shortly after the Second World War behind ‘The Wheatsheaf' pub, with many of these properties now owner occupied. Other in-fill building in the village has increased the population of the parish from fewer than 300 in the early 1900s to 534 recorded in the 2001 census. This decreased slightly to 501 at the time of the 2011 census.

== History ==
The name Dunham-on-the-Hill means "hill village or homestead", deriving from the Old English dūn (a hill) and hām (a village, community or homestead).

The village is mentioned in the Domesday Book of 1086 as Doneham under the ownership of Earl Hugh of Chester. The entry lists eleven households (seven villagers, three smallholders and one 'smiths'). Comprising farmland, meadow and some woodland, Aescwulf of Landican had previously been the owner in 1066.

Dunham-on-the-Hill was a township in Thornton parish, Eddisbury Hundred, which became a civil parish in 1866. Its population was recorded as 260 in 1801, then 332 in 1851, 282 in 1901, 446 in 1951 and increasing to 534 by 2001.

Dunham Hill railway station opened in 1850 as part of the Birkenhead Railway. It closed in 1952, although the tracks passing through the station site are still operational as the Chester–Warrington line.

Royal Ordnance Factory ROF Dunham on the Hill was an explosives storage depot built during World War II. The facility had its own on-site railway, with access provided via a branch line near the railway station. The depot closed during the 1960s and most of the land has been given over to agriculture. Some of the old storage sheds can still be seen from the M56 motorway.

The village school closed in 2008. The 'Dunham Arms' pub reopened in 2010.

Dunham-on-the-Hill was formerly a township in the parish of Thornton-le-Moors, in 1866 Dunham on the Hill became a separate civil parish, on 1 April 2015 the parish was abolished to form "Dunham-on-the-Hill and Hapsford", part also went to Manley.

The parish church of St Luke was built in the 1860s.

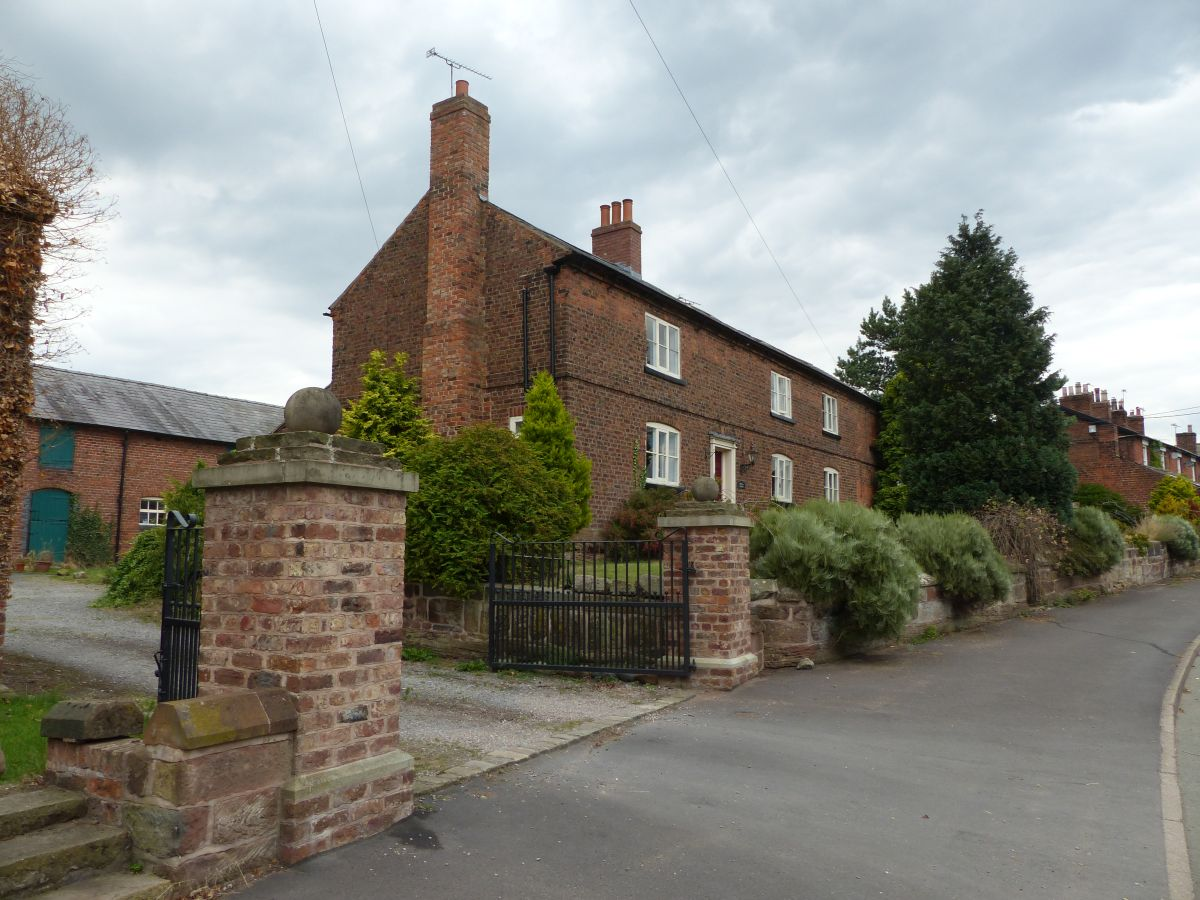
The 17th century Smithy farmhouse, one of several listed buildings in the village.

== See also ==
- Listed buildings in Dunham on the Hill
