= Harmers Wood =

Woodland with quarries in Cheshire, England

Coordinates: 53.271°N 2.757°W

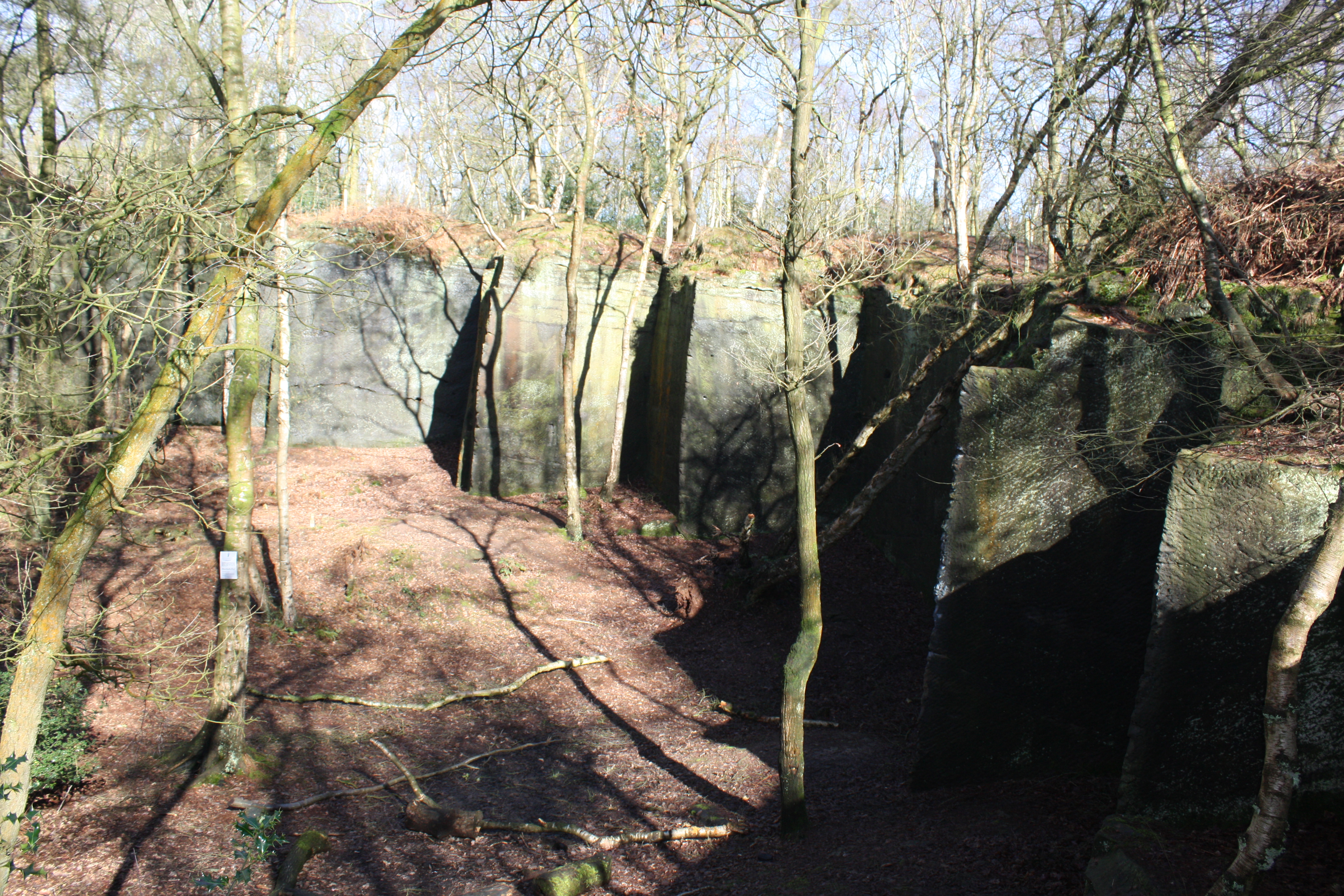
The Classroom Quarry at Harmers Wood

Harmers Wood is a small woodland with sandstone quarries in Helsby village in the north of Cheshire, England. It is a nine-acre woodland containing mainly silver birch trees with some oak and a smattering of holly trees, rowan, hawthorn and gorse. The wood is owned by the Friends of Harmers Wood Trust as a not-for-profit business managed on behalf of the local community.

== Geology ==
As with much of the geology of Cheshire, the forest floor sits on 225-million-year old Triassic sandstone. Layers of soft red sandstone can be found with the harder white sandstone that has been quarried in four places in the woodland, during the 19th century for use in local buildings.

== Sports ==
Harmers Wood has developed a reputation amongst the rock-climbing fraternity, with over sixty climbs of varying difficulty in two of the quarries.

== History ==
The wood was originally known as the Pine Wood, presumably when pine trees grew in the area. However, most trees were destroyed during World War II from jettisoned incendiary bombs from German planes after bombing raids on the city of Liverpool.

Quarrying was carried out between 1830 and 1870 using hand-held tools and steam cranes with the stone being used in local buildings including St Paul's Church in Helsby.
