= Thornton-le-Moors =

Village in Cheshire West and Chester, England

Coordinates: 53.265°N 2.838°W

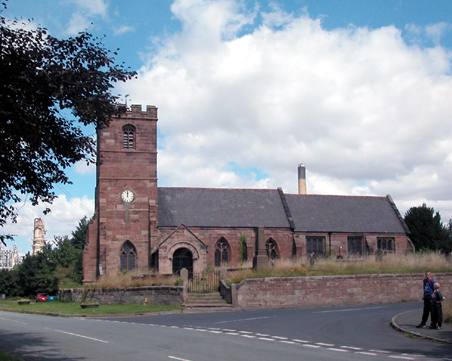
- St Mary's Church, Thornton-le-Moors

- Location within Cheshire
- Population: 264 (Parish, 2021)
- OS grid reference: SJ4474
- Civil parish: Thornton-le-Moors
- Unitary authority: Cheshire West and Chester
- Ceremonial county: Cheshire
- Region: North West
- Country: England
- Sovereign state: United Kingdom
- Post town: CHESTER
- Postcode district: CH2
- Dialling code: 01244
- Police: Cheshire
- Fire: Cheshire
- Ambulance: North West
- UK Parliament: Runcorn and Helsby

Thornton-le-Moors is a village and civil parish in the unitary authority of Cheshire West and Chester and the ceremonial county of Cheshire, England. At the 2021 census, the parish had a population of 264. The village is 7 miles (11 km) north-east of the city of Chester. It is situated to the south of the A5117 road. To the north of the village is the Stanlow Refinery. To the west is the nearest town of Ellesmere Port and to the north-east is the village of Elton.

== Governance ==
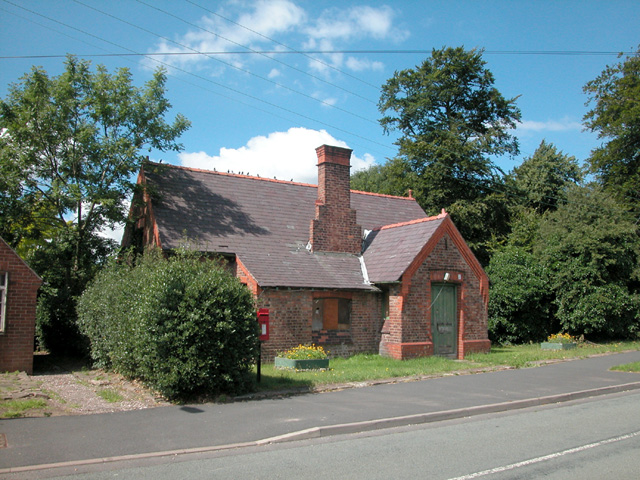
Village Hall

There are two tiers of local government covering Thornton-le-Moors, at parish and unitary authority level: Thornton-le-Moors Parish Council, and Cheshire West and Chester Council. The parish council meets at the village hall on Thornton Green Lane.

=== Administrative history ===
Thornton-le-Moors was an ancient parish in the Eddisbury Hundred of Cheshire. The parish was subdivided into five townships, being Dunham-on-the-Hill, Elton, Hapsford, Wimbolds Trafford, and a Thornton-le-Moors township covering the village itself and adjoining countryside. From the 17th century onwards, parishes were gradually given various civil functions under the poor laws, in addition to their original ecclesiastical functions. In some cases, including Thornton-le-Moors, the civil functions were exercised by each township separately rather than the parish as a whole. In 1866, the legal definition of 'parish' was changed to be the areas used for administering the poor laws, and so each township became a separate civil parish.

The population of the township or civil parish was 156 in 1801, 186 in 1851, 130 in 1901, 223 in 1951 and 260 in 2001.

== Religious sites ==
St Mary's Church, Thornton-le-Moors is a Grade I listed building. The church was restored by the Churches Conservation Trust in 2010.

== Transport ==
The nearest railway station is Ince & Elton; although Stanlow and Thornton is nearer, it is currently closed due to safety concerns with its footbridge. Ince & Elton has a minimal service.

Thornton-le-Moors is served by a regular hourly bus between Chester and Runcorn, operated by Stagecoach Merseyside and South Lancashire.

== See also ==
- Listed buildings in Thornton-le-Moors
