= Manley Knoll =

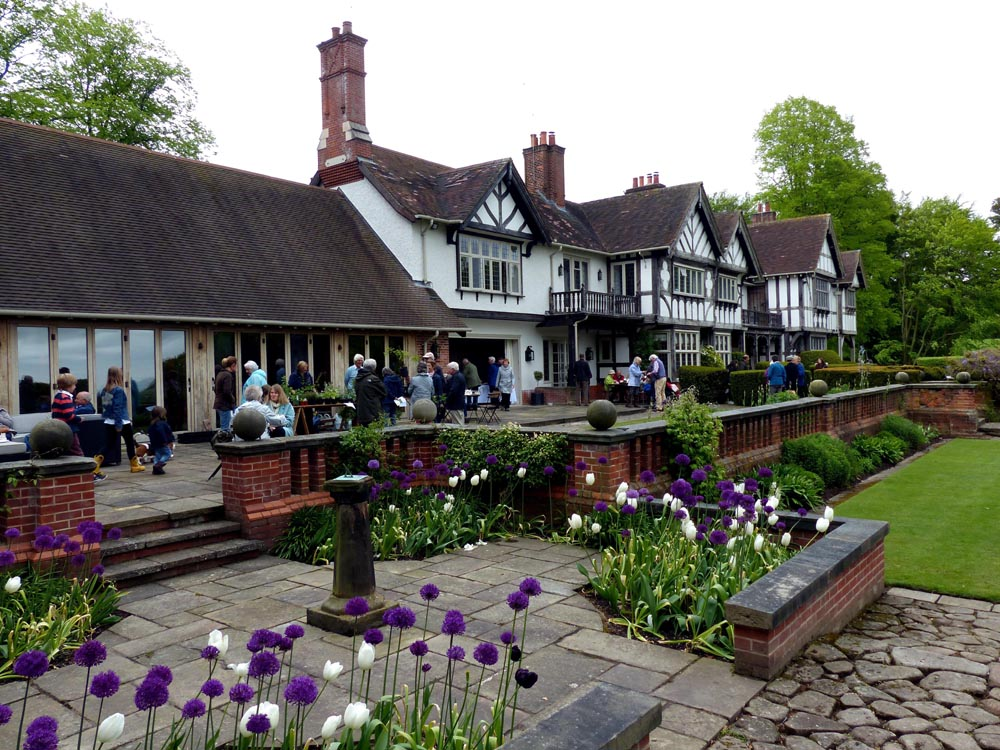

- Location in Cheshire
- 53.24752°N 2.73196°W
- Location: Manley, Cheshire, England

Listed Building – Grade II
- Official name: Manley Knoll
- Designated: 28 June 2000
- Reference no.: 1380568

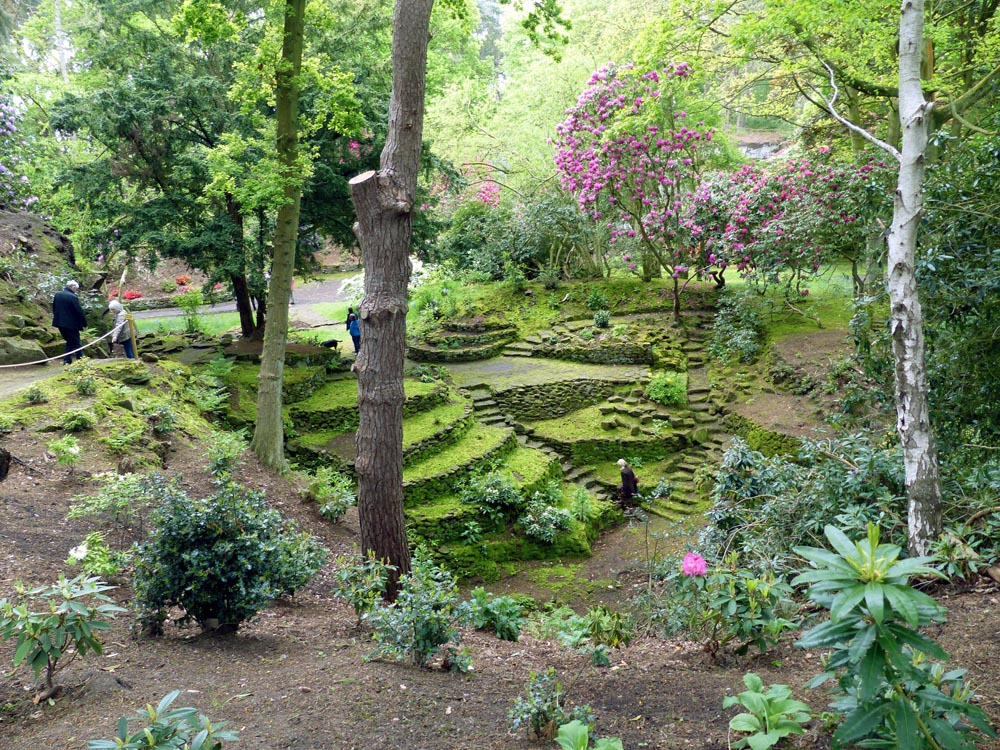
Manley Knoll gardens

Manley Knoll is a small country house north of the village of Manley, Cheshire, England. It was designed in 1912 for Llewellyn Jones. Its construction was interrupted by the First World War. In 1922 the interior was remodelled for the Demetriades family by the Manchester architect James Henry Sellers. In the 1920s a billiard room was added. The house is constructed in buff-brown brick with orange brick dressings, and some timber framing and roughcast. The roofs are tiled. Its architectural style has been described as Arts and Crafts, or eclectic Vernacular Revival. It has an irregular linear plan. The entrance front is asymmetrical, in two storeys, with an off-centre porch. To the left of the porch is a timber-framed projection, and to the right is a staircase bay and a service bay. In the garden front are four timber-framed gables with a central loggia over which is a balcony. Each of the gables is decorated with different Cheshire patterns. The house is recorded in the National Heritage List for England as a designated Grade II listed building.

Manley Knoll is situated adjacent to another small country house called Manley Wood, which was built in 2001 on the former site of Sunnybank Farm. The two sites used to be one, with a road leading between, but this road is now unusable.

== See also ==
- Listed buildings in Manley, Cheshire
