= Hapsford Hall =

Country house in Cheshire, England

Coordinates: 53.2637°N 2.7904°W

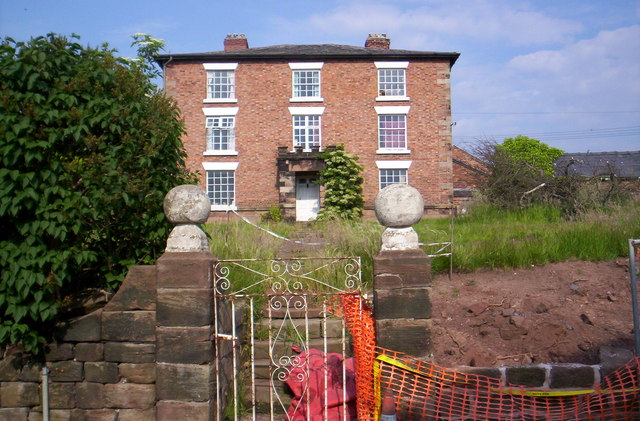
Hapsford Hall

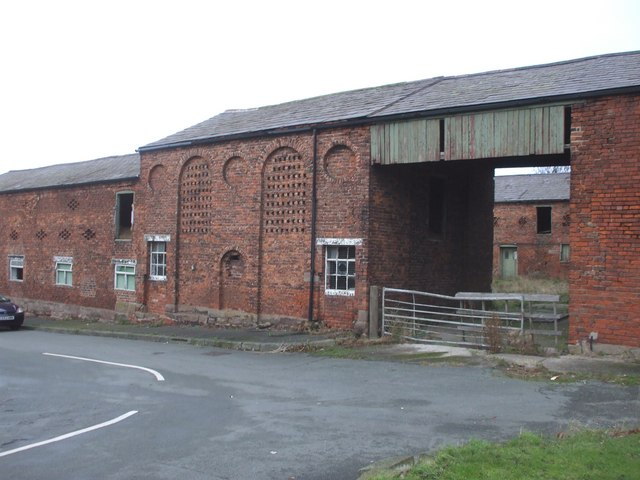
Barn

Hapsford Hall is a country house about 1 mile (1.6 km) south-west of Helsby, Cheshire, England. It was built in the late 18th or early 19th century and incorporates a former farmhouse; additions and alterations have been made since it was built. It is constructed in brick and stone, stands on a stone plinth, and has stone quoins and a hipped slate roof. The house is in three storeys, with cellars and an attic, and has a symmetrical front of three bays. Most of the windows on the front are sashes; elsewhere are casement windows. An embattled stone porch projects from the centre. The house is recorded in the National Heritage List for England as a designated Grade II listed building.

Also listed at Grade II is a barn to the south of the house. This was built at about the same date as the house. It is also constructed in brick, stands on a stone plinth and has a slate roof. The barn has a five-bay north front. The second and fourth bays contain recessed arches and air-vents; the other bays have arched openings, one of which is blocked, above which are pitch holes. The south front is similar, but has square windows in the ground floor of the lateral bays, and its pitch holes are blocked.

== See also ==
- Listed buildings in Hapsford
