= Christ Church, Ellesmere Port =

Coordinates: 53.2861°N 2.8951°W

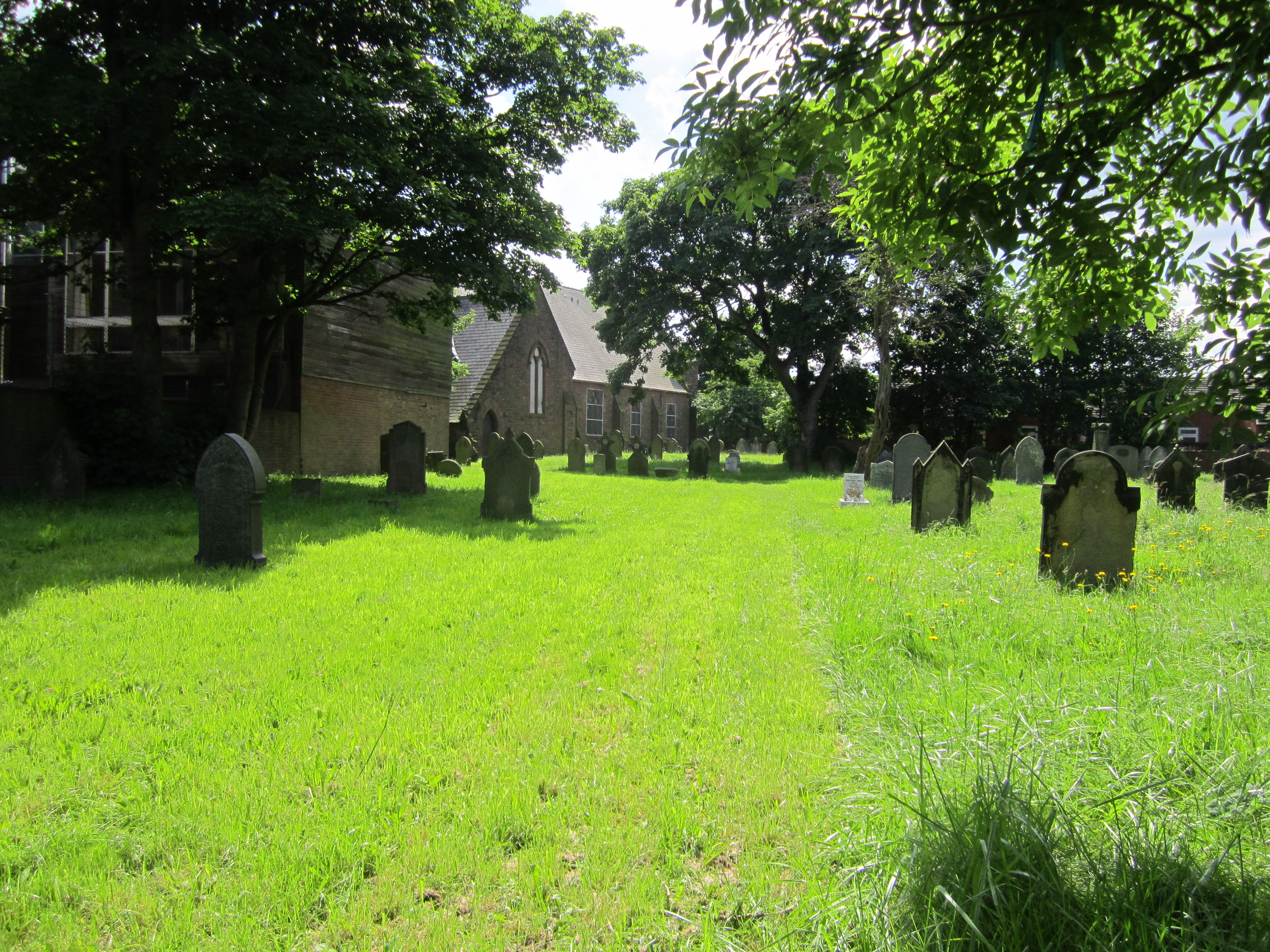
- Christ Church and the cemetery

- Location in Cheshire
- OS grid reference: SJ 404 770
- Location: Station Road, Ellesmere Port, Cheshire
- Country: England
- Denomination: Elim Pentecostal

History
- Status: Former parish church

Architecture
- Functional status: Active
- Heritage designation: Grade II
- Designated: 17 May 1985
- Architect(s): Penson and Ritchie; Barnish and Grayson
- Architectural type: Church
- Style: Gothic Revival
- Groundbreaking: 1869
- Completed: 1925
- Closed: 1 April 1994

Specifications
- Materials: Sandstone

Christ Church is an Elim Pentecostal Church in Station Road, Ellesmere Port, Cheshire, England. The church is recorded in the National Heritage List for England as a designated Grade II listed building.

== History ==
Christ Church was built as an Anglican church in 1869–71, the architects being Penson and Ritchie. The nave was extended to the west in 1922–25 by Barnish and Grayson. The church was declared redundant on 1 April 1994. The building was bought in 2010 by the Oasis Christian Centre for £25,000. It was renovated and opened as an Elim Pentecostal Church in March 2011.

== Architecture ==
The church is constructed in sandstone rubble. Its plan is cruciform consisting of a four bay nave, a chancel, single-bay north and south transepts, and a vestry. On the south side is a tower, with louvred bell openings and a pyramidal spire. The east window has three lights and contains Geometric tracery. the nave windows also have three lights, and those in the transepts have two lights. Both the vestry and the transepts are gabled.

== External features ==
The churchyard contains 26 war graves, those of 25 British Army soldiers of World War I, and a Royal Navy seaman of World War II.

== See also ==
- Listed buildings in Ellesmere Port
