= Listed buildings in Helsby =

Helsby is a village and a civil parish in Cheshire West and Chester, England. The A56 road passes through it in a north–south direction. To the east is the former Helsby hill fort and to the west are the Manchester Ship Canal and the River Mersey. Helsby contains 13 buildings that are recorded in the National Heritage List for England as designated listed buildings, all of which are at Grade II. This grade is the lowest of the three gradings given to listed buildings and is applied to "buildings of national importance and special interest".

Name and location	Photograph	Date	Notes
265 Chester Road; 53.2765°N 2.7655°W	—	Late 17th century	A cottage in sandstone and brick with a single storey plus an attic.
Rose Farmhouse; 53.2761°N 2.7663°W	—	Late 17th century (probable)	A two-storey building in rendered brick with some sandstone and a slate roof. The windows are casements.
Wright's Cottage, Bates Lane; 53.2775°N 2.7559°W	—	Early 18th century	A cottage, originally with a barn behind. It is constructed in whitewashed brick and sandstone, and was originally thatched; it now has a corrugated iron roof.
Alvanley House; 53.2684°N 2.7637°W	—	1773	A two-storey brick house with slate roofs and 16-pane recessed sash windows.
Rake House; 53.2760°N 2.7682°W	—	1807	Originated as a two-storey brick farmhouse with grey slate roofs. The windows are 16-pane sashes.
Shippon and barn, Rose Farmhouse; 53.2761°N 2.7668°W	—	Early 19th century	A two-storey L-shaped building in brown brick with grey slate roofs.
Bank House; 53.2775°N 2.7642°W	—	1830 (probable)	A two-storey house in brown brick with a grey slate roof, which is almost pyramidal. The windows are 16-pane recessed sashes.
Helsby Station and stationmaster's house 53.2753°N 2.7706°W	—	1849	Built for the Birkenhead, Lancashire and Cheshire Junction Railway Company in sandstone with slate roofs.
Shelter, Helsby railway station 53.2754°N 2.7710°W		1849	Built for the Birkenhead, Lancashire and Cheshire Junction Railway Company in sandstone with slate roofs; it is in Jacobean style.
St Paul's Church; 53.2775°N 2.7612°W		1868–70	A church designed by John Douglas and extended in 1909 by Douglas and Minshull. It is constructed in sandstone with slate roofs, and has transepts, an apsidal chancel, and a spire.
Helsby Junction signal box 53.27539°N 2.77098°W		1900	The signal box stands on the island platform of Helsby railway station. It was built by and for the London and North Western Railway, and is an example of their Type 4. The signal box was renovated in 2003. It is constructed with a brick base, a timber upper floor, and a Welsh slate roof. The original lever frame has been retained.
Lychgate, St Paul's Church; 53.27772°N 2.76125°W		1911	A timber-framed lychgate on a stone plinth with a green slate roof.
War memorial 53.27753°N 2.76179°W		1920	The war memorial is in the churchyard of St Paul's Church. It is about 5 metres (16 ft) high, in sandstone, and consists of a Celtic cross with a tapering shaft and a wheelhead, both of which are decorated with complex vine patterns in relief. The shaft is on a rectangular pedestal, itself on a base of three steps, all of which are on a platform. There is an inscription on the shaft, and the names of those lost in both world wars are inscribed on the plinth.

== See also ==
- Listed buildings in Alvanley
- Listed buildings in Dunham-on-the-Hill
- Listed buildings in Elton
- Listed buildings in Frodsham
- Listed buildings in Hapsford
- Listed buildings in Ince
