= Crossley Hospital East =

- Crossley Hospital East

- Shown in Cheshire

Geography
- Location: Delamere Forest, Cheshire, England
- Coordinates: 53.255°N 2.708°W

Organisation
- Care system: NHS
- Type: Specialist

Services
- Emergency department: No
- Speciality: Tuberculosis

History
- Founded: 1905; 121 years ago
- Closed: 1988; 38 years ago

Links
- Lists: Hospitals in England

Crossley Hospital East (founded 1905 as the Crossley Sanatorium) is a former tuberculosis sanatorium situated on the outer edge of Delamere Forest in Cheshire. It is recorded in the National Heritage List for England as a designated Grade II listed building.

== History ==
Inside the main building

The facility was largely financed by Sir William Crossley, Bt, chairman of the board of management of the Hospital for Consumption and Diseases of the Throat and Chest, Manchester and opened as the Crossley Sanatorium in March 1905. 100 beds were provided. Admission was restricted to residents of Manchester. It joined the National Health Service as Crossley Hospital East in 1948 and served as a psychiatric hospital before closing in 1988.

The building was briefly used as a boarding school until 1991 and then lay derelict until 2006 when the developer, PJ Livesey, started to redevelop the site for residential use as Kingsley Park.

== Television ==
The hospital was featured on the TV programme "Ghost Hunting with Girls Aloud", where Yvette Fielding and the pop group Girls Aloud explored various parts of Crossley Hospital in search of ghosts. However, on the programme, the hospital was referred to simply as "the old abandoned hospital".

== See also ==
- Listed buildings in Manley, Cheshire
