= Listed buildings in Alvanley =

Alvanley is a civil parish in Cheshire West and Chester, England. It contains the village of Alvanley, but is otherwise rural. Included in the parish are 24 buildings that are recorded in the National Heritage List for England as designated listed buildings. Most of these are houses or farm buildings; the others consist of a church plus two tombs in the churchyard, a school, a guidepost, and a structure that is either a wayside or a plague cross.

== Key ==
Grade	Criteria
Grade II*	Particularly important buildings of more than special interest.
Grade II	Buildings of national importance and special interest.

== Buildings ==
Name and location	Photograph	Date	Notes	Grade
Maiden's Cross; 53.25688°N 2.72941°W	—	Medieval (probable)	This consists of a trapezoidal piece of sandstone with a chamber on the front face. It is either the base of a wayside cross or a plague cross. It is also a scheduled monument.	II
Austerson Old Hall; 53.2558°N 2.7361°W		Mid-16th century (probable)	This is constructed in brick, sandstone, and timber framing with close studding, and has tiled roofs. It consists of a hall and a cross wing. It originally stood in the village of Austerson, Cheshire; it was taken down and re-assembled here in the early 1980s.	II
Clematis Cottage; 53.2633°N 2.7590°W		Early 17th century	The cottage was altered and extended in 1693. It has a T-shaped plan, is constructed in sandstone, now painted, and has a slate roof. The cottage is in 1 1/2 storeys, and contains mullioned windows.	II
Alvanley Hall; 53.2585°N 2.7457°W		17th century	An L-shaped sandstone farmhouse in two storeys plus attics with slate roofs. The windows are mullioned. In the cellar are two large medieval circular piers on polygonal bases.	II*
Walnut Tree Farmhouse; 53.2635°N 2.7596°W	—	17th century	A T-shaped farmhouse in partly pebbledashed sandstone, with a brick extension and slate roofs. It is in two and 2 1/2 storeys. One of its windows has five lights and is mullioned; the other windows are casements. There is some internal timber framing	II
Commonside Farmhouse; 53.2639°N 2.7450°W		Mid-17th century (probable)	This a timber-framed building with crucks, encased in brick, with a sandstone wall on the north side. The roof is thatched. The farmhouse is in 1 1/2 storeys, with a 20th-century extension to the rear. The windows are casements, and dormers.	II
Tithebarn, Alvanley Hall; 53.2570°N 2.7442°W	—	Late 17th century	A tithebarn in brown brick with a slate roof.	II
Birch Cottage; 53.2661°N 2.7592°W	—	Late 17th century	Basically a timber-framed cottage, this has been encased in brick, which is now painted. The roof is thatched. The cottage is in 1 1/2 storeys, and has a single-storey brick extension on the left.	II
Meadowbank Cottage; 53.2657°N 2.7542°W	—	Late 17th century (probable)	This was encased in brick, probably in the 19th century. It stands on a sandstone plinth, and has a thatched roof. The college is in one storey with attics, and has a brick rear extension.	II
Poplar Tree Farmhouse; 53.2630°N 2.7589°W		1684	A two-storey brick house on a sandstone plinth with a slate roof. The brickwork is decorated with diapering and dentillation and with stone bands. The windows are casements, and the doorcase is pedimented.	II
Holly Tree Cottage; 53.2649°N 2.7471°W	—	18th century (probable)	Now a cottage, this originated as a farmhouse and shippon. It is rendered with a thatched roof, and has a single storey plus attic. The windows are casements, other than a single dormer. It contains an internal timber-framed wall.	II
Ash Cottage; 53.2618°N 2.7572°W		1795	A two-storey cottage in brick on a sandstone plinth, both of which have been rendered. The roof is slated, and the windows are casements.	II
Pear Tree Cottage; 53.2618°N 2.7558°W	—	1795	An L-shaped brick cottage on a sandstone plinth with one rendered wall. The roof is felt-covered slate, and the windows are casements.	II
Shippon, stable and cartshed, Poplar Tree Farmhouse; 53.2628°N 2.7587°W		c. 1800	An L-shaped building in brick and sandstone with corrugated asbestos roofs. Features include pitching holes and external stone steps.	II
Griffith tomb 53.2612°N 2.7551°W	—	c. 1800	A table tomb in St John's churchyard. It is in red sandstone, the table being supported on three cross-slabs. The panels contain inscriptions relating to members of the Griffith family.	II
Noden tomb 53.26121°N 2.75492°W	—	c. 1800	A table tomb in St John's churchyard. It is in red sandstone with panels on each side, carved with festoons, urns and inscriptions relating to members of the Noden family.	II
Stables and cartshed, Alvanley Hall; 53.2574°N 2.7445°W	—	Early 19th century	Constructed in brick with slate roofs, the features incorporate doors, including a divided stable door, arched openings, windows, and pitching holes.	II
Greenbank Farmhouse; 53.2615°N 2.7567°W	—	Early 19th century	A two-storey brick house with slate roofs. The door has a simple pediment. Other than one fixed 16-pane window, the other windows are horizontally sliding sashes.	II
Church House Farmhouse; 53.2604°N 2.7544°W		Early 19th century (probable)	A brick house on a sandstone plinth in late Georgian style. It consists of a main three-bay gabled block with two storeys and an attic, and a two-storey wing to the right. The windows in the main block are sashes, and those in the wing are casements. The sandstone garden wall is included in the listing.	II
Shippon, Church House Farmhouse; 53.2601°N 2.7546°W	—	Early 19th century (probable)	A shippon in late Georgian style. It is constructed brick on a sandstone plinth with one wing in sandstone, and has a slated roof. The features include doorways, archways, a casement window, and diamond-shaped vents.	II
St John the Evangelist's Church; 53.2613°N 2.7547°W		1860	Designed by J. S. Crowther, the church is constructed in sandstone with slate roofs, and is in early Decorated style. On the west end is a corbelled belfry with two bells.	II
School and schoolmaster's house 53.2610°N 2.7558°W	—	c. 1860	A L-shaped school building with attached schoolmaster's house in brick with stone dressings and slate roofs. The school has a bellcote with a spirelet, a clock, and a 17th-century bell which was moved from the old church when it was rebuilt. The school includes two triple lancet windows, and the house has a mullioned and transomed window and a dormer. The building was possibly designed by J. S. Crowther.	II
Guidepost; 53.26129°N 2.72740°W	Guidepost at Four Lane End, Alvanley, England	1870s (probable)	This is in cast iron standing about 2 metres (7 ft) high. The post is octagonal with a plinth, a cap, and a ball finial. The plates indicate distances to nearby locations in sans-serif capitals.	II

== See also ==
- Listed buildings in Dunham-on-the-Hill
- Listed buildings in Frodsham
- Listed buildings in Helsby
- Listed buildings in Manley
