= Austerson Old Hall =

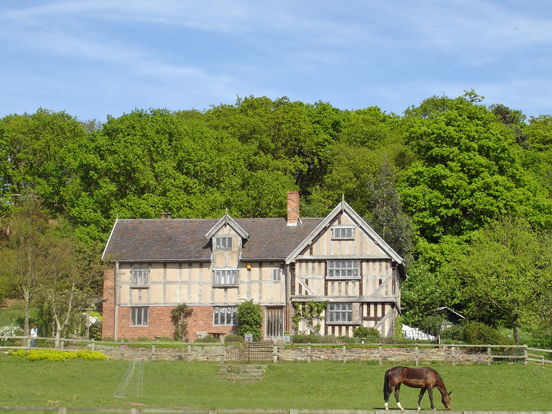

- Location in Cheshire
- 53.2558°N 2.7361°W
- Location: Alvanley, Cheshire, England

Listed Building – Grade II
- Official name: Austerson Old Hall
- Designated: 6 December 1985
- Reference no.: 1312735

Austerson Old Hall is 1 mile (1.6 km) southeast of the village of Alvanley, Cheshire, England. It is recorded in the National Heritage List for England as a designated Grade II listed building. The hall was dismantled and moved from its original site in the village of Austerson near Nantwich, Cheshire, in the early 1980s.

The hall is constructed in timber-framing and brick, and has a tiled roof. It consists of a hall with a cross-wing. The hall dates probably from the 17th century, and the cross-wing probably from the previous century. Both parts contain close studding.
