= Randle Holme =

English family of herald painters and genealogists

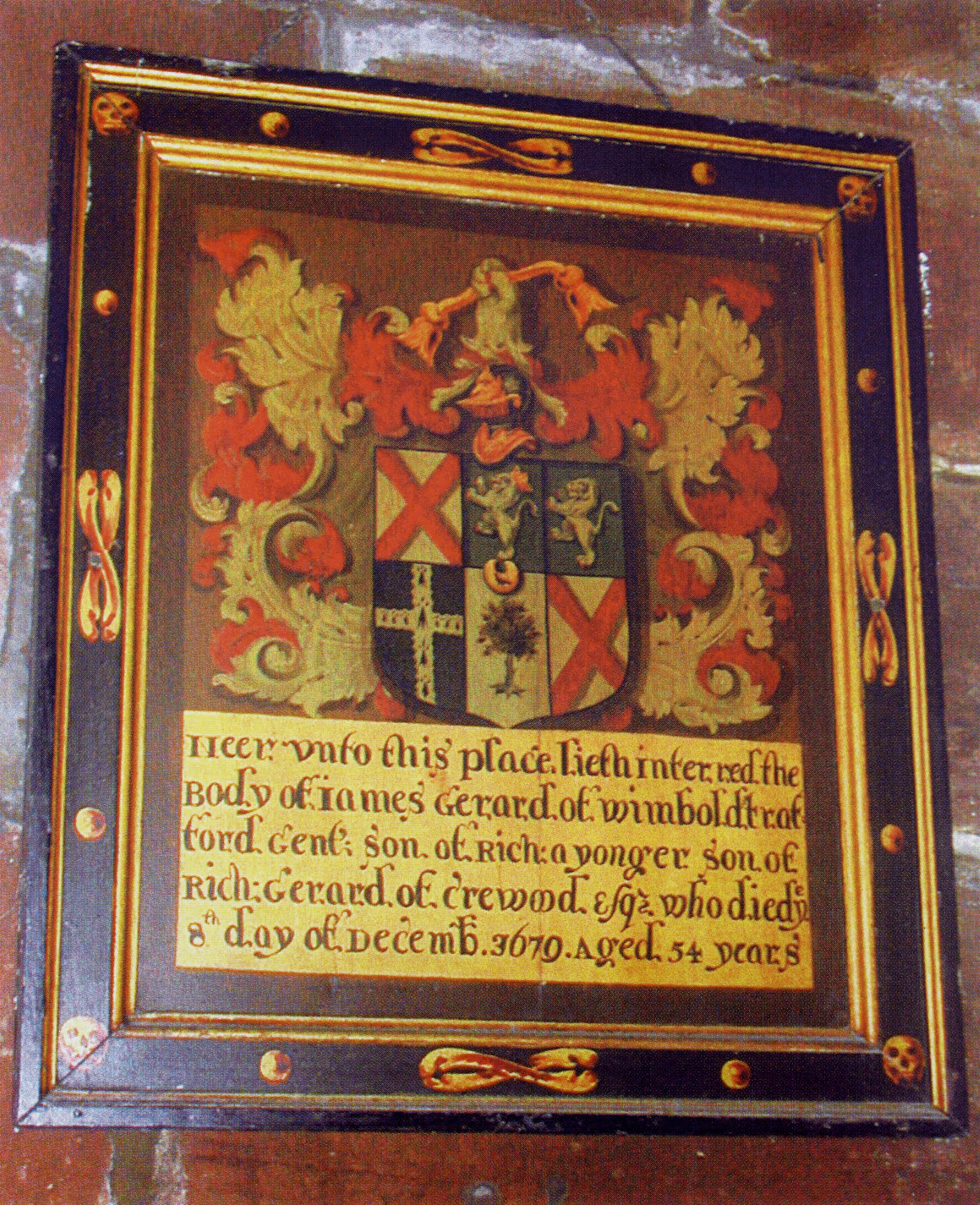
Memorial board in St Mary's Church, Thornton-le-Moors, probably by Randle Holme III

Randle Holme was a name shared by members of four successive generations of a family who lived in Chester, Cheshire, England from the late years of the 16th century to the early years of the 18th century. They were all herald painters and genealogists and were members of the Stationers' Company of Chester. All four painted memorial boards and hatchments, and some of these can still be found in Cheshire churches.

== Randle Holme I (1570/71–1655) ==
The first to bear the name, he was born in Chester, the son of Thomas Holme, a blacksmith whose family came from Tranmere, which was then in Cheshire, and Elizabeth Devenett from Kinnerton, Flintshire. He was apprenticed to Thomas Chaloner who was deputy to William Flower, Norroy King of Arms in 1578. He was elected an alderman by 1604 and appointed as a servant to Prince Henry by May 1607. In 1600 and again in 1606 Holme was appointed deputy herald of the College of Arms in Cheshire, Lancashire and North Wales.

Holme's main duty was to arrange funerals of those entitled to bear arms but he also made an income from painting hatchments and memorial boards. From the early 1620s ill health prevented him from undertaking long journeys and his son Randle Holme II deputised for him by making the annual Easter reports to the College of Arms. He was fined for not attending the coronation of Charles I in 1626 and for refusing a knighthood in 1631. Holme was sheriff of Chester in 1615–16 and mayor in 1633–34. He remained in the city of Chester during the siege of Chester in the Civil War from September 1645 to February 1646 and also during the plague of 1648. Supported by Sir William Brereton he was made a commissioner for peace and oversaw the repair of the city walls.

In 1598 he married Elizabeth née Alcock, who was Thomas Chaloner's widow. They had three children, William, Randle and Elizabeth. On 11 September 1635 he married Catherine Browne, daughter of Ralph Allen, alderman of Chester. He died on 16 January 1655 and was buried at St Mary's on the Hill.

== Randle Holme II (c.1601–1659) ==
He worked closely with his father and became deputy herald of the College of Arms for Lancashire in 1627. He was Chester city treasurer in 1633 and clerk to the Stationers' Company of Chester in 1641. In 1633–34 he was sheriff of Chester (in the same year that this father was mayor) and in 1643–44 he was mayor. During the siege of Chester he supported the Royalist cause and after the city fell he was dismissed as alderman and justice of the peace. Later in his life he worked mainly as a genealogist.

In 1625 he married Catherine Ellis of Overleigh and they had six children who survived infancy. Catherine died in 1640 and in 1643 he married Elizabeth Martyn, daughter of Thomas Dodd of Chester. He was buried at St Mary's on the Hill on 1 September 1659.

== Randle Holme III (1627–1700) ==
He was born on 24 December 1627 and was the eldest son of the above. He was steward to the Stationers' Company of Chester in 1656 and an alderman from 1659. In 1664 Charles II granted him a sinecure, known as "sewer of the chamber of the extraordinary". He prepared items of heraldry and took fees for them without permission from the Norroy king of arms, Sir William Dugdale. Dugdale took him to court, Holme lost the case and it was decided that all the offending boards should be removed, defaced or destroyed. Dugdale travelled north on at least three occasions to carry this out himself. Later Holme made peace with Dugdale and by 1675 was making funeral certificates for him. In 1678 he was appointed deputy herald for Chester, Lancashire and North Wales. He was the only one of the four Randle Holmes not to hold civic office in Chester and was also one of the first Freemasons in Chester.

He wrote a book entitled The Academie of Armorie and in 1688 printed parts 1 and 2 and some of book 3 at his house but the venture proved too expensive to complete. The rest of book 3 and book 4 were published in 1905 by the Roxburghe Club. Book 1 relates completely to heraldry and the other books form a "kind of encyclopaedia".

He married Sarah Soley in 1655 and they had five children. Sarah died in 1665 and the following year he married Elizabeth Wilson and with her had another eight children. Elizabeth died in 1685 and in 1689 he married Ann, whose surname is not known. He died on 12 March 1700 and was buried at St Mary's.

== Randle Holme IV (c.1659–1707) ==
He worked in partnership with his father, was sheriff of Chester in 1705–06 and deputy herald. He married Margaret Lloyd from Llanarmon, Denbighshire, and had five children who all died young. He himself died on 30 August 1707 and was buried at St Mary's.

== Legacy ==
Monuments to family members are in the church of St Mary on the Hill, Chester. The family manuscript collection amounts to 261 volumes and is held in the British Library. All four Randle Holmes were collectors of legal and other documents and the collection forms one of the principal sources for Cheshire history.

Memorial boards dated in the years the Randle Holmes were flourishing are present in many churches in Cheshire. However, as these never contain the name of the painter we cannot be sure which are by members of the Randle Holme family. Many of the boards painted by Randle Holme III were destroyed by Sir William Dugdale in visits to Cheshire and surrounding counties in 1667, 1668 and 1670. However Dugdale's diary contains details of the destruction of memorial boards in only eight churches. There are no other known individuals or schools of heraldic painting in the Chester area during the time the Randle Holme family was flourishing. Identification rests mainly on the style of the paintings and their dates. Suggested examples of existing memorial boards by Randle Holme III and other members of the family are four in St James' Church, Audlem, three in St Boniface's Church, Bunbury, one in St James' Church, Christleton, two in St John the Baptist's Church, Knutsford, seven in St Mary's Church, Thornton-le-Moors, 13 in St Lawrence's Church, Stoak, five in St Andrew's Church, Tarvin, two in St Margaret's Church, Wrenbury, one in St Helen's Church, Tarporley, six in St Oswald's Church, Backford and 17 in the city of Chester. A further board attributed to the family is in St Mary's Church, Pulford.

Much of The Academie of Armorie was made available in 2000 on a CD produced by the British Library entitled Living and Working in Seventeenth Century England: an Encyclopedia of Drawings and Descriptions from Randle Holme's Original Manuscripts for The Academy of Armory (1688).
