= St John the Evangelist's Church, Alvanley =

Coordinates: 53.2613°N 2.7547°W

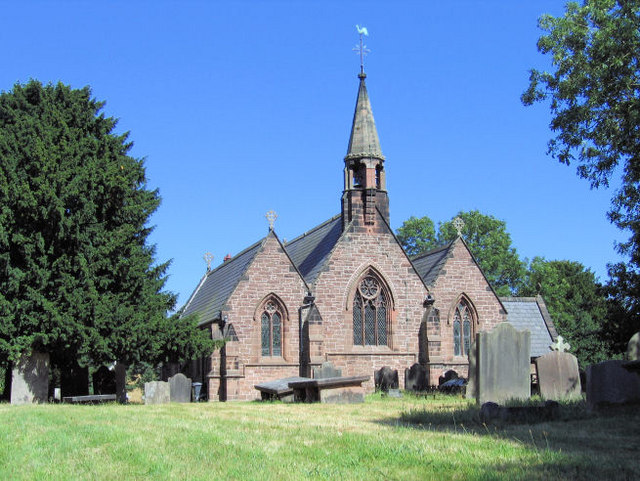
- St John's Church, Alvanley, from the west

- Location in Cheshire
- OS grid reference: SJ 498 741
- Location: Alvanley, Cheshire
- Country: England
- Denomination: Anglican
- Website: St John, Alvanley

History
- Status: Parish church
- Dedication: John the Evangelist

Architecture
- Functional status: Active
- Heritage designation: Grade II
- Designated: 6 December 1985
- Architect: J. S. Crowther
- Architectural type: Church
- Style: Gothic Revival
- Completed: 1860

Specifications
- Materials: Red sandstone Grey slate roofs

Administration
- Province: York
- Diocese: Chester
- Archdeaconry: Chester
- Deanery: Frodsham
- Parish: Alvanley

Clergy
- Vicar: Revd Richard Tuckwell

St John the Evangelist's Church is in the village of Alvanley, Cheshire, England. It is an active Anglican parish church in the diocese of Chester, the archdeaconry of Chester and the deanery of Frodsham. Its benefice is united with that of St John the Evangelist, Manley. The church is recorded in the National Heritage List for England as a designated Grade II listed building. It is described by the authors of the Buildings of England series as "a building of some character".

== History ==
The church was built in 1860 to a design by J. S. Crowther at the expense of Catherine Emma Arden, the youngest daughter of Richard Arden, 1st Baron Alvanley.

== Architecture ==
=== Exterior ===
The church is built in red sandstone with gabled grey slate roofs in early Decorated style. Its plan consists of four-bay nave with north and south aisles under separate roofs, and a chancel with a north vestry. On the west end is a corbelled belfry with small steeple containing two bells. The windows contain either Geometric tracery, or Y-tracery. The gables have ornate cross finials.

=== Interior ===
The arcades are carried on circular piers. The stained glass dates from the early 20th century, and is probably by Shrigley and Hunt. Also in the church is a wooden board giving the list of curates since 1677, and vicars since 1861.

== External features ==
In the churchyard are two tombs which are listed at Grade II, and the war graves of a British and a Canadian soldier of World War I.

== See also ==
- Listed buildings in Alvanley
- List of works by J. S. Crowther
