= Alvanley Hall =

Country house in Cheshire, England

Coordinates: 53.2584°N 2.7457°W

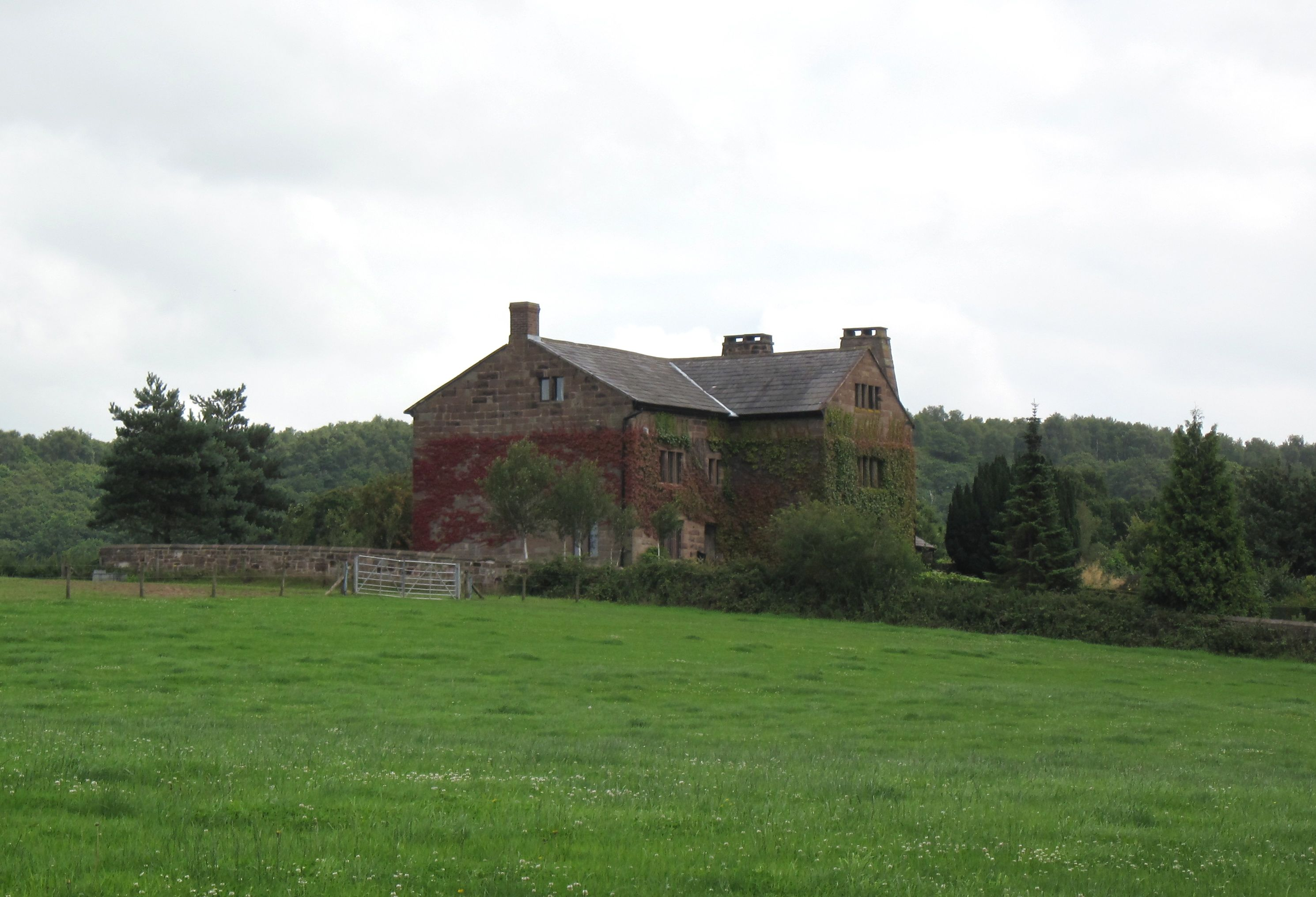
View of Alvanley Hall from a nearby footpath

Alvanley Hall is in Manley Road, 0.25 miles (0.4 km) to the southeast of the village of Alvanley, Cheshire, England. It is recorded in the National Heritage List for England as a designated Grade II* listed building. It is associated with the Arden family.

The hall dates from various periods, mainly the 17th century, with some parts from earlier dates, and with later additions. It is constructed in red sandstone, with later brick additions, and has a grey slate roof. It is an L-shaped building in two storeys and an attic. It contains tall mullioned windows, and internal timber-framed partitions. In the cellar are two large medieval piers standing on polygonal concave-sided bases.

Some 180 metres (590 ft) to the southeast of the hall is a tithe barn dating from the late 17th century constructed in brick with a slate roof, and standing on a sandstone plinth. It is listed at Grade II.

== See also ==
- Listed buildings in Alvanley
