= Listed buildings in Manley, Cheshire =

Manley is a civil parish in Cheshire West and Chester, England. It is entirely rural, and contains nine buildings that are recorded in the National Heritage List for England as designated listed buildings, all of which are at Grade II. This is the lowest of the three grades, which contains "buildings of national importance and special interest". The major building in the parish is the former Crossley Hospital East. This building is listed, together with five structures relating to it. The other listed buildings are two houses, and a former dovecot.

== Buildings ==
Name and location	Photograph	Date	Notes
Dovecot, Manley Old Hall; 53.24837°N 2.74389°W		Late medieval (probable)	This originated as a gatehouse or porch for the original Manley Old Hall, it was converted into a dovecot in 1660, and was repaired in 1799. It is a square structure in two storeys, in brick on a sandstone base, but no roof has survived. Inside are five tiers of nest boxes.
New Pale Lodge; 53.2491°N 2.7137°W	—	1623	A two-storey sandstone house with a slate roof. There have been additions and alterations in the 17th, 18th and 20th centuries. It has a T-shaped plan, with a six-bay front elevation, the right two bays projecting forward. At the left end is a massive stepped chimney stack. Internal features date back to the 17th century.
Crossley Hospital East; 53.2545°N 2.7083°W		1902–04	A hospital for the treatment of tuberculosis established as a charitable foundation by the Crossley Brothers. It closed as a hospital in the 1980s, and had various uses before being converted into apartments. It is constructed in red brick with terracotta dressings and pebbledash panels and has tiled roofs with finials. It was designed by W. Cecil Hardisty, is in an E-plan, and is in Renaissance Revival style.
Boiler house and power plant Crossley Hospital East; 53.255°N 2.709°W	—	1902–04	A group of ancillary buildings for the hospital. They are in five ranges forming a C-plan, they are single-storied (two of them have clerestories), and they are constructed in brick with terracotta dressings and concrete tile roofs.
Pair of cottages Crossley Hospital East; 53.255°N 2.709°W	—	1902–04	Two cottages for members of the staff of the hospital. They two-storey red brick houses with terracotta dressings, shaped pebbledashed gables, and tiled roofs. In the centre are two canted bay windows; the other windows are mainly casements.
Pathology laboratory and mortuary Crossley Hospital East; 53.255°N 2.709°W	—	1902–04	Ancillary buildings for the hospital. They are in a single storey and three bays, forming an L-shaped plan. The buildings are constructed in brick with terracotta dressings. The windows are mainly original casements.
Nurses Home; Crossley Hospital East; 53.255°N 2.709°W	—	1902–04	A three-storey building in red brick with terracotta dressings and pebbledash panels and has tiled roofs. Its frontage is almost symmetrical and has a projecting centre bay. It is in Renaissance Revival style.
Manley Knoll; 53.2475°N 2.7320°W		1912–14	This is a small country house in brown brick with orange brick dressings, some timber framing and pebbledash and tiled roofs. It has an irregular linear plan, and is in a variation of Vernacular Revival style. The house was remodelled internally in 1922 by James Henry Sellers.

== See also ==
- Listed buildings in Alvanley
- Listed buildings in Ashton Hayes
- Listed buildings in Barrow
- Listed buildings in Delamere
- Listed buildings in Dunham-on-the-Hill
- Listed buildings in Frodsham
- Listed buildings in Kingsley
- Listed buildings in Mouldsworth
- Listed buildings in Norley
