= Listed buildings in Frodsham =

Frodsham is a civil parish in Cheshire West and Chester, England. It contains 63 buildings that are recorded in the National Heritage List for England as designated listed buildings. Of these, one is listed at Grade I, the highest grade, another one is listed at Grade II*, the middle grade, and the others are at Grade II. The parish consists of the market town of Frodsham and surrounding countryside. The River Weaver and the Weaver Navigation run through the northern part of the parish, and there are two associated listed structures. The Warrington to Chester railway line runs in a north–south direction through the parish. Frodsham railway station, and the Frodsham viaduct crossing the Weaver, are listed. The oldest listed building, and the only one at Grade I is St Laurence's Church, which contains some Norman features. The Grade II* building is the former vicarage, which was extended in the 19th century by John Douglas. Most of the other listed buildings are houses and associated structures, shops, and cottages, some of which date back to the 16th and 17th centuries and are timber-framed. The other listed structure include farmhouses, farm buildings, public houses, hotels, boundary stones, tidestones, a sundial, memorials, and telephone kiosks. The newest listed building is a former anti-aircraft operations room that was built in about 1951.

== Key ==
Grade	Criteria
I	Buildings of exceptional interest, sometimes considered to be internationally important
II*	Particularly important buildings of more than special interest
II	Buildings of national importance and special interest

== Buildings ==
Name and location	Photograph	Date	Notes	Grade
St Laurence's Church; 53.29044°N 2.71969°W		Late 12th century	The church contains some fabric from the 11th century. It is built in sandstone, and consists of a nave with aisles, a chancel with chapels, porches, and a west tower. The church was partly rebuilt by Bodley and Garner between 1880 and 1883. It contains some Norman features, particularly in the arcades, but most of it is Gothic.	I
44 High Street; 53.29716°N 2.72345°W	—	Late 16th century (probable)	A cottage built with timber framing that has been largely replaced by brick. It stands on a bedrock outcrop and a sandstone plinth, and has a slate roof. The exterior is rendered, and inside is the lower part of a cruck frame.	II
56 Hillside Road; 53.28915°N 2.71957°W		Early 17th century (probable)	A cottage that is partly timber-framed and partly in rendered sandstone, formerly with a corrugated asbestos roof. It is in a single storey with an attic. The windows are casements. The building underwent substantial renovation in 2015 including reinstatement of the thatch roof.	II
Lower Rileybank Farmhouse; 53.27724°N 2.72641°W	—	Early 17th century (probable)	The farmhouse is partly in sandstone and partly in brick with a slate roof. It is in two storeys, and has a cross-wing that was formerly a chapel. The windows are casements, and inside the farmhouse is an inglenook.	II
Bear's Paw Hotel; 53.29611°N 2.72599°W		1632	A public house that was restored in 1903–04 by Douglas and Minshull. It is in sandstone with a slate roof. The building has an E-shaped plan, is in two storeys, and has a five-bay front. The outer and central bays project forward; all the bays are gabled with finials. The windows are mullioned and transomed.	II
53, 55 and 57 Main Street; 53.2946°N 2.7298°W		17th century	A row of three timber-framed cottages, pebbledashed on the front, and with rebuilt brick gables at the ends. The roof is slated, and the windows are casements. No. 53 has a jettied gable, and inside No. 55 is an inglenook.	II
84 Main Street; 53.29504°N 2.72726°W		17th century	A timber-framed house on a sandstone plinth with plaster infill and a slate roof. It is in two storeys and has a three-bay front. The windows are casements.	II
85 and 89 Main Street; 53.29534°N 2.72756°W		17th century	Originally three cottages, later converted into two. At first they were timber-framed, and this has been partly replaced in brick. The cottages stand on a sandstone plinth and have thatched roofs, no. 85 being lower than no. 89. They are in two storeys. The windows are casements, those in the upper storeys being in dormers. Inside no. 89 is an inglenook.	II
90 Main Street; 53.29517°N 2.72693°W	—	17th century	A shop that was refronted in the early 19th century. It is in brick and has a slate roof. The shop is in two storeys with a doorway and a canted bay window on the ground floor. There are two casement windows in the upper storey, and at the rear of the shop is a full-height sandstone wall.	II
Farm buildings, Manor Farm; 53.29782°N 2.71798°W	—	17th century	The farm buildings have been extended and altered. They are partly in sandstone, and partly in brick, and have slate roofs. The building are in a L-shaped plan, and consist of a stable, a haybarn and a shippon. Their features include doorways, windows and pitch holes.	II
Old Hall Hotel; 53.2952°N 2.7279°W		17th century (probable)	This originated as a house, and has been converted into a hotel. It is pebbledashed, with a slate roof, and is in one and two storeys. On the left is a cross-wing, and on the right is an L-shaped wing. The windows are a mix of sashes and casements.	II
Queen's Head Hotel; 53.29524°N 2.72674°W		17th century	The front of the hotel was rebuilt probably in the early 19th century. It is partly in stone, and partly in rendered brick, and has a slate roof. The hotel is in two storeys with attics, and has a four-bay front. The left bay is a canted two-storey bay window. To the right of this is a recessed round-arched porch. The windows are sashes. At the rear is an attached coach house with an external staircase and a horizontal sliding sash window.	II
Ring O'Bells Inn; 53.29003°N 2.72003°W		17th century (probable)	A pebbledashed public house with a slate roof. It is in two storeys with a three-bay front, and has a double-pile plan. The windows are casements. Inside is an altered inglenook, and a number of small rooms have been retained.	II
47, 49 and 51 Main Street; 53.29448°N 2.73004°W		17th century (and later)	A row of three cottages, basically timber-framed, that were built separately. All are now mainly in brick, which is pebbledashed, on a sandstone plinth. The left cottage is in two storeys and has a central doorway flanked by windows. The middle cottage is in 1 1/2 storeys with two windows, one in a dormer. The right cottage is in two storeys, is gabled, and has one window in each storey. All the windows are casements.	II
Church House Farmhouse; 53.29033°N 2.71817°W		Late 17th century (probable)	A brick farmhouse with a slate roof, later converted into a house. It is in two storeys with an attic, and has a symmetrical three-bay front. The windows are casements. Inside is an altered inglenook.	II
Stable, Queen's Head Hotel; 53.29508°N 2.72645°W		Late 17th century	The front gable of the stable and the lower part of the other walls are in sandstone, the rest being in brick. The roof is slated, and the gable is coped.	II
Rock Farm and Rock Cottage; 53.28830°N 2.73213°W		1680	A sandstone house and cottage in one range with a slate roof. They are in two storeys, and there is an additional wing to the right. The windows are later casements. The date is inscribed on a lintel above the door.	II
Five Crosses Farmhouse; 53.28252°N 2.70797°W	—	c. 1700	A brick farmhouse with a rendered front, which was extended to the left in about 1830. The house is in two storeys with an attic, and has a three bay front, the left bay being slightly lower. In the centre is a small canted bay window. The windows are sashes, and inside the house is an altered inglenook.	II
Millbank Farm; 53.29325°N 2.73204°W	—	18th century (or earlier)	Originally the house of a miller, it was extended and recased in brick in the early 19th century. The house stands on a sandstone plinth and has a slate roof. It is in two storeys with an attic and a cellar, There is a three-bay front, and a cross-wing on the left. The right wing is gabled, and the windows are sashes.	II
Godscroft Hall Farmhouse; 53.2853°N 2.7467°W	—	Early 18th century (probable)	The farmhouse is on the site of a former corn mill, and was encased in sandstone and extended in about 1830. The roof is slated. The farmhouse is in two storeys and has a four-bay front. The windows are sashes, and the door has a classical doorcase.	II
Old Vicarage; 53.28972°N 2.71702°W	—	Early 18th century	The vicarage was altered in the early 19th century, and extended in 1872 by John Douglas. It is in brick with stone dressings, and has a tiled roof. The house is in two storeys with an attic, and is Jacobean style. Its plan is complex, and includes a turret with a spire. The windows are mullioned.	II*
1 Church Street; 53.29596°N 2.72545°W	—	Mid-18th century	This was initially a house, now converted into a shop. It is in brick with stone dressings and has a hipped slate roof. The house is in three storeys, and has three bays on High Street and two on Church Street. At the top of the house is a parapet with a moulded cornice. On the High Street front is a bay window and on the Church Street side is a modern shop front. The windows are sashes.	II
4 High Street; 53.29602°N 2.72529°W	—	Mid-18th century	Originating as a house, this has been converted for other uses. It is a brick building with stone dressings, and has a hipped slate roof. The house is in three storeys, and has a three-bay front. The windows are a mix of sashes and casements.	II
Overton House; 53.28970°N 2.71848°W		Mid-18th century	A brick house on a sandstone plinth with stone dressing and a slate roof. It has three storeys with a basement and has a three-bay front. The doorway has an architrave. The windows are sashes, those in the lower two storeys having stone cills and lintels with keystones and voussoirs. On the sides are rusticated quoins and at the top is a cornice.	II
The Paddocks; 53.26429°N 2.72438°W		Mid-18th century	A sandstone farmhouse with a slate roof. It is in three storeys, and has a three-bay front. On each side are single storey extensions. On the garden front are two single-storey canted bay windows. The windows are a mix of sashes and casements.	II
Boundary stones (north bank); 53.30060°N 2.69370°W	—	c. 1770	A row of four boundary stones on the north bank of a water meadow near the Frodsham Cut of the River Weaver, marking the boundaries of farmers' rights to strips of the water meadow. They are in sandstone, are rectangular in section, and stand about 50 centimetres (20 in) high. One of the stones is inscribed with initials and an incomplete date.	II
Boundary stones (south bank); 53.29890°N 2.69460°W	—	c. 1770	A row of four boundary stones on the south bank of a water meadow near the Frodsham Cut of the River Weaver, marking the boundaries of farmers' rights to strips of the water meadow. They are in sandstone, are rectangular in section, and stand about 50 centimetres (20 in) high. One of the stones is inscribed with initials.	II
83 Main Street; 53.29526°N 2.72774°W		Late 18th century (probable)	A brick cottage on a sandstone plinth that retains earlier features, including some timber-framing. It has a thatched roof, is in two storeys, and has a two-bay front. The windows are casements.	II
Brook Farmhouse; 53.28594°N 2.70068°W		Late 18th century (probable)	A brick farmhouse with a slate roof. It is in two storeys and has a three-bay front. The windows are casements.	II
Shippon, Manor Farm; 53.29770°N 2.71871°W		Late 18th century (probable)	A farm building in brick with a slate roof. It is in two storeys, with a loft in the roof. The features include various openings, external stone steps, pitch holes, and ventilation openings in different shapes.	II
Shippon, Riley Bank Farm; 53.26488°N 2.72215°W	—	Late 18th century (probable)	A farm building in sandstone with an asbestos roof. It is in two storeys with an attic. The features include various openings, hopper windows, pitch holes, and loophole ventilation openings.	II
Frodsham Lock and Weir; 53.29905°N 2.69629°W		1781	The lock and weir are at the western end of Frodsham Cut, part of the Weaver Navigation, where it rejoins the River Weaver. They were designed by Robert Pownall and George Leigh, and have since been modified. The lock is built in brick and stone. There are double lock gates in timber, now derelict, and 20th-century sluice gear in steel and concrete.	II
Frodsham Weir and Sluice; 53.30286°N 2.69465°W	—	1785	The weir and sluice gates are between the Weaver Navigation and the River Weaver. The weir is curved and is about 45 metres (148 ft) wide. To the south of it are two sluice gates, each about 5 metres (16.4 ft) wide. The sluices have stone piers with semicircular cutwaters and stone abutments.	II
Sundial; 53.29905°N 2.69629°W		1790	The sundial is in the churchyard of St Laurence's Church. It has a sandstone base and stem standing on three round steps. On the top is a copper dial and a gnomon, the former being inscribed with the names of churchwardens and the date.	II
Garden walls, Old Hall Hotel; 53.29553°N 2.72851°W	—	c. 1800	The walls are on the north and west sides of the garden at the rear of the hotel. They are in brick with stone copings, and are 50 metres (164 ft) by 30 metres (98 ft) long. The walls are about 2 metres (6.6 ft) high, and have rectangular buttresses.	II
Golden Lion; 53.29578°N 2.72571°W		c. 1800	A public house in rendered brick on a sandstone plinth with a slate roof. It is in three storeys, and has two bays on Main Street and five on Church Street. The end bay in Church Street is gabled with a bargeboard and a finial. There is one round-headed doorway on Main Street, and two on Church Street. The windows are sashes.	II
Tidestone at SJ 51543 77900; 53.29583°N 2.72846°W	—	c. 1802	The tidestone marks the limit of the high tide on Frodsham Marsh in 1802, It consists of a red sandstone pillar about 30 centimetres (12 in) above the ground. The tidestone has a rectangular section and a segmental head, and is inscribed on the front face.	II
Wright Memorial; 53.29040°N 2.72014°W		c. 1806	The memorial is in the churchyard of St Laurence's Church. It is in stone, and consists of a truncated obelisk on a square plinth. On each side of the obelisk is an oval panel inscribed with details of those commemorated.	II
Bradley Hall Farmhouse; 53.28854°N 2.70317°W		c. 1820	The farmhouse is in brick with a slate roof. It is in three storeys, and has a symmetrical three-bay front. The doorway has a round-headed arch and a fanlight. The windows are sashes under wedge lintels.	II
46 and 48 Main Street; 53.29434°N 2.72939°W	—	Early 19th century	A pair of cottages later converted into shops. They are in brick on a sandstone plinth and have a slate roof. The building is in two storeys; in the ground floor are shop fronts, and above there are two sash windows. To the left is an entry.	II
92 Main Street; 53.29519°N 2.72683°W		Early 19th century	A shop in painted brick forming a canted bay to the right of the Queen's Head Hotel. It is in two storeys and has a slate roof. In the lower storey is a shop front flanked by a door on the left and a sash window on the right. There are also sash windows in the upper storey.	II
101 and 103 Main Street; 53.2956°N 2.7272°W		Early 19th century	A pair of shops with accommodation above in three storeys. They are constructed in brick with a slate roof. There are shop fronts in the ground floor and canted bay windows in the first floor. The windows are sashes.	II
108 and 110 Main Street; 53.29569°N 2.72590°W	—	Early 19th century	Originally three shops, later converted into two. The building is in rendered brick on a stone plinth with a slate roof. It is in three storeys with shop fronts and doorways in the ground floor and sash windows above.	II
Millbank Cottage; 53.29298°N 2.73211°W	—	Early 19th century	A cottage, later divided into two, in brick with a slate roof. It has two storeys, and a two-bay front. There is a fanlight above the door, and the windows are sashes.	II
L-shaped farm building, Riley Bank Farm; 53.26511°N 2.72237°W		Early 19th century (probable)	A farm building in two ranges forming an L-shaped plan. It is in sandstone, with a roof partly slated and partly in corrugated asbestos. It stands on sloping ground, and has three storeys at the front, and two at the back. The features include various openings, a hopper window, a pitch hole, and external stone steps.	II
Ashley House; 53.29471°N 2.72939°W		c. 1830	A brick house on a sandstone plinth with a hipped slate roof. It is in two storeys, and has a symmetrical five-bay front. The doorcase is in Roman Doric style, and above the door is a semi-elliptical fanlight. The windows are sashes.	II
Brook House; 53.29423°N 2.72972°W		c. 1830	A brick house with a slate roof. It is in three storeys, and has a symmetrical three-bay front. The doorcase is in simple classical style. The windows are sashes.	II
Rock Villa; 53.29791°N 2.72138°W		c. 1830	A brick house with a slate roof. It is in two storeys, and has a central doorway flanked by windows. The windows are sashes.	II
Cottage and coach shed, Manor Farm; 53.29811°N 2.71835°W	—	Early 19th century	The cottage and coach shed have been converted into use as a farm building. It is in brick with a slate roof. The building is in two storeys with casement windows.	II
Frodsham Viaduct; 53.30250°N 2.70893°W		1848–50	A viaduct crossing River Weaver for the Birkenhead, Lancashire and Cheshire Junction Railway, with Alexander Rendel as engineer and Thomas Brassey as contractor. It is constructed in sandstone, brick and cast iron. There are two arched iron spans over the river, with two arches to the west and 21 arches to the east.	II
Frodsham railway station 53.29589°N 2.72372°W		1849–50	The former stationmaster's house is attached to the station. The building in brick with stone dressings and a slate roof, and has two storeys, with a single-storey wing at each end. The building is in Jacobean style, with shaped gables. The windows are mullioned.	II
52 Main Street; 53.29446°N 2.72895°W		Mid-19th century	A brick house on a sandstone plinth with stone dressings and a slate roof in Georgian style. It has two storeys with an attic, and a symmetrical three-bay front. At the top is an open pediment containing a circular window. The doorcase has a pediment and a round-headed fanlight. On each side of the house is a curving wall leading to a pedimented pavilion, each of which has a circular window in the pediment. All the other windows are sashes.	II
Entry to military premises 53.29450°N 2.72886°W		Mid-19th century	This is a battlemented gateway in red sandstone. It consists of a segmental arch with flanking walls containing mock arrow slits. There are inscriptions of a military nature and coats of arms on the keystone, the stone above it, and on voussoirs. There is a pedestrian entrance in the left wall.	II
Folly tower 53.27034°N 2.73996°W	—	Mid-19th century	This is a tapering sandstone tower without a roof, standing on a hilltop. Two steps lead up to a doorway with a circular opening, and on the sides are rectangular openings. At the top is a corbel table and a mock parapet.	II
Trustee Savings Bank; 53.29538°N 2.72649°W		1852	This originated as the town's office, and was later used as a bank. It is in brick with stone dressings, and has a hipped slate roof. The bank is in Italianate style, with two storeys and a five-bay front. There is a cill band, a frieze and a cornice between the floors and at the top of the building. Above the doorway is a pediment. The windows are sashes; in the lower storey they have wedge lintels, and above they are in architraves.	II
Tidestone at SJ 51537 77891; 53.29577°N 2.72856°W	—	c. 1862	The tidestone marks the limit of the high tide on Frodsham Marsh in 1862, It consists of a red sandstone pillar about 50 centimetres (20 in) above the ground. The tidestone has a rectangular section and a rounded head, and is inscribed on the front face.	II
Hand pump, Lower Riley Bank; 53.27706°N 2.72637°W	—	Late 19th century	The hand pump is in cast iron. It consists of a fluted chamber with a plate containing the name of the manufacturer. On top is a fluted domed cap. The pump feeds into a stone trough.	II
War Memorial, Overton Hill; 53.28820°N 2.72507°W		1919	The war memorial is in sandstone on a prominent hilltop. It stands on three square steps, and has a plinth inscribed with the names of those who were lost. On each side at the top of the plinth is a pediment. From the plinth rises a tapering obelisk, the whole monument being about 11 metres (36 ft) high.	II
War Memorial gates and railings 53.28618°N 2.72280°W		1921	The gates and railings provide an entrance to the avenue leading to the war memorial, They are in cast and wrought iron, the railings being split by main gates and pedestrian gates. The gates contain inscribed panels.	II
War Memorial, St Laurence's Church; 53.29028°N 2.71993°W		1921	The war memorial is in the churchyard, and is in Runcorn sandstone. It has an octagonal base of three steps, an octagonal plinth, and an octagonal shaft with a moulded collar. The cross head is in the form of a pierced wheel, with a figure of Christ crucified. There are slate plaques bearing the names of those lost and inscriptions for the First World War on the plinth, and for the Second World War on the base.	II
Telephone kiosk 53.29534°N 2.72517°W		1927	A K4 type telephone kiosk, known as a "Giant" because of its large size, and its incorporation of a posting box and stamp machines. It was designed by Giles Gilbert Scott, and is in cast iron, with glazed doors and sides.	II
Telephone kiosk 53.29455°N 2.72877°W	—	1935	A K6 type telephone kiosk, designed by Giles Gilbert Scott. Constructed in cast iron with a square plan and a dome, it has three unperforated crowns in the top panels.	II
Former Anti-aircraft Operations Room; 53.28412°N 2.72197°W	—	c. 1951	A square two-storey building in reinforced concrete with steel blast doors half sunken in the ground. Its interior includes such rooms as a plotting room, communication rooms, and rest rooms. The structure was built to survive an atomic explosion. Following the end of the Cold War it was used as a Civil Defence Training Centre, and later as a County Standby Control Centre.	II

== See also ==
- Listed buildings in Alvanley
- Listed buildings in Aston-by-Sutton
- Listed buildings in Helsby
- Listed buildings in Kingsley
- Listed buildings in Manley
- Listed buildings in Runcorn (urban area)
- Listed buildings in Sutton
