= St Paul's Church, Helsby =

Coordinates: 53.2775°N 2.7612°W

- St Paul's Church, Helsby, from the northeast in 2026

- Location in Cheshire
- OS grid reference: SJ 493 758
- Location: Helsby, Cheshire
- Country: England
- Denomination: Anglican
- Website: St Paul's Helsby

History
- Status: Parish church
- Dedication: Saint Paul

Architecture
- Functional status: Active
- Heritage designation: Grade II
- Designated: 6 December 1985
- Architect(s): John Douglas; Douglas and Minshull
- Architectural type: Church
- Style: Gothic Revival
- Groundbreaking: 1868
- Completed: 1909

Specifications
- Materials: Yellow sandstone Green Westmorland slate roofs

Administration
- Province: York
- Diocese: Chester
- Archdeaconry: Chester
- Deanery: Frodsham
- Parish: St Paul, Helsby

Clergy
- Vicar: Reverend Noel Mc Garrigle

St Paul's Church is in the village of Helsby, Cheshire, England. The church is recorded in the National Heritage List for England as a designated Grade II listed building, and is an active Anglican parish church in the diocese of Chester, the archdeaconry of Chester and the deanery of Frodsham. Its benefice is combined with that of St Luke, Dunham-on-the-Hill.

== History ==
The church was built between 1868 and 1870 to a design by the Chester architect John Douglas. The south aisle and chapel were added in 1909 and designed by Douglas and Minshull.

== Architecture ==
The church is built in yellow sandstone quarried from nearby Harmers Wood, with green Westmorland slate roofs. Its plan consists of a five-bay nave, a south aisle, transepts and a polygonal apsidal chancel. The style of the architecture is Early English. Over the west end of the nave is a towerless spire covered in slate. The windows are lancets with simple tracery.

== Churchyard ==
In the churchyard are two structures also listed at Grade II. At the entrance to the churchyard is a lychgate dating from 1911, consisting of an oak frame on low stone plinth. It has a green slate roof that has ornate bargeboards and finials. Inside the churchyard and overlooking the road is a war memorial dating from 1920. This is in sandstone and consists of a Celtic cross decorated with vine patterns and inscribed with the names of those lost in both World Wars. The churchyard also contains the war grave, east of the church, of a Second World War soldier.

== See also ==
- List of new churches by John Douglas
- Listed buildings in Helsby
