= Bear's Paw Hotel, Frodsham =

Grade II listed hotel in Main Street, Frodsham, Cheshire, England

Bear's Paw Hotel
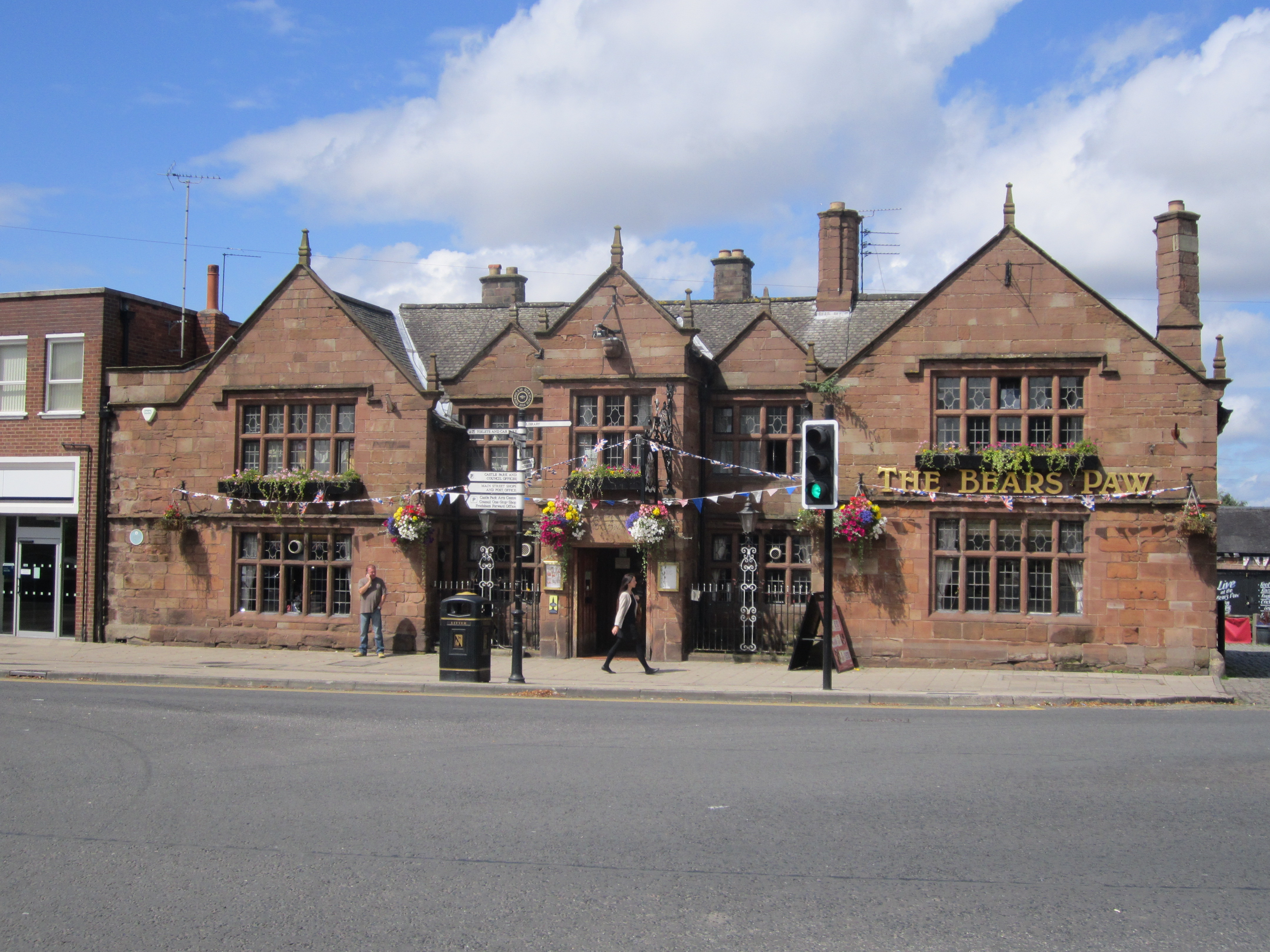

- Location in Cheshire
- 53.2961°N 2.7260°W
- Location: Main Street, Frodsham, Cheshire, England
- OS grid reference: SJ 517 779

History
- Built: 1632

Site notes
- Architect: Douglas and Minshull
- Restored: 1903–04
- Website: https://www.greeneking.co.uk/pubs/cheshire/bears-paw

Listed Building – Grade II
- Designated: 20 October 1952
- Reference no.: 1261825

The Bear's Paw Hotel is in Main Street, Frodsham, Cheshire, England. It is recorded in the National Heritage List for England as a designated Grade II listed building, and is now a public house.

== History ==
According to the date on the lintel over the front door, the Bear's Paw was constructed in 1632. It was built on land owned by the Savages of Rocksavage, who were lords of the manor. The original name was the 'Lyon's Paw', this being based on an animal's paw on the arms of the Savage family. In 1697 Earl Rivers of the Savage family reverted to Roman Catholicism and, following the outcry resulting from this, the name was changed to the 'Bear's Paw'. In the 18th century its title was the 'Bears Paw Hotel and Posting House'; Royal Mail coaches called there when travelling between Chester, Warrington and Manchester. When the Lancashire, Cheshire and Birkenhead Railway opened in 1850, Frodsham station was near the hotel and 'Railway Hotel' was added to its title. In 1903–04 the front and side of the building were restored by the Chester firm of architects Douglas and Minshull.

== Architecture ==
The front and sides of the building are in sandstone, and the rear is in brick. The roof is of slate. The building is almost symmetrical and has an E-shape plan, with two storeys. Each of the five bays has a gable with a finial. The central bay has a doorway in the lower storey and a three-light window above. The outer bays, which project forwards, have five-light windows in both storeys; the recessed bays between these and the porch have three-light windows in both storeys. All the windows are mullioned and transomed. There are four stone chimneys. The lintel over the front door, in addition to the date, includes the initials "WL" and "ML", which are those of William and Margaret Littlemore, the original owners. The interior has been much altered. However the main cellar runs for the full length of the building and another cellar runs under the garden at the back.

== See also ==
- Listed buildings in Frodsham
- List of non-ecclesiastical and non-residential works by John Douglas
