= St Mary's Church, Thornton-le-Moors =

Coordinates: 53.2650°N 2.8386°W

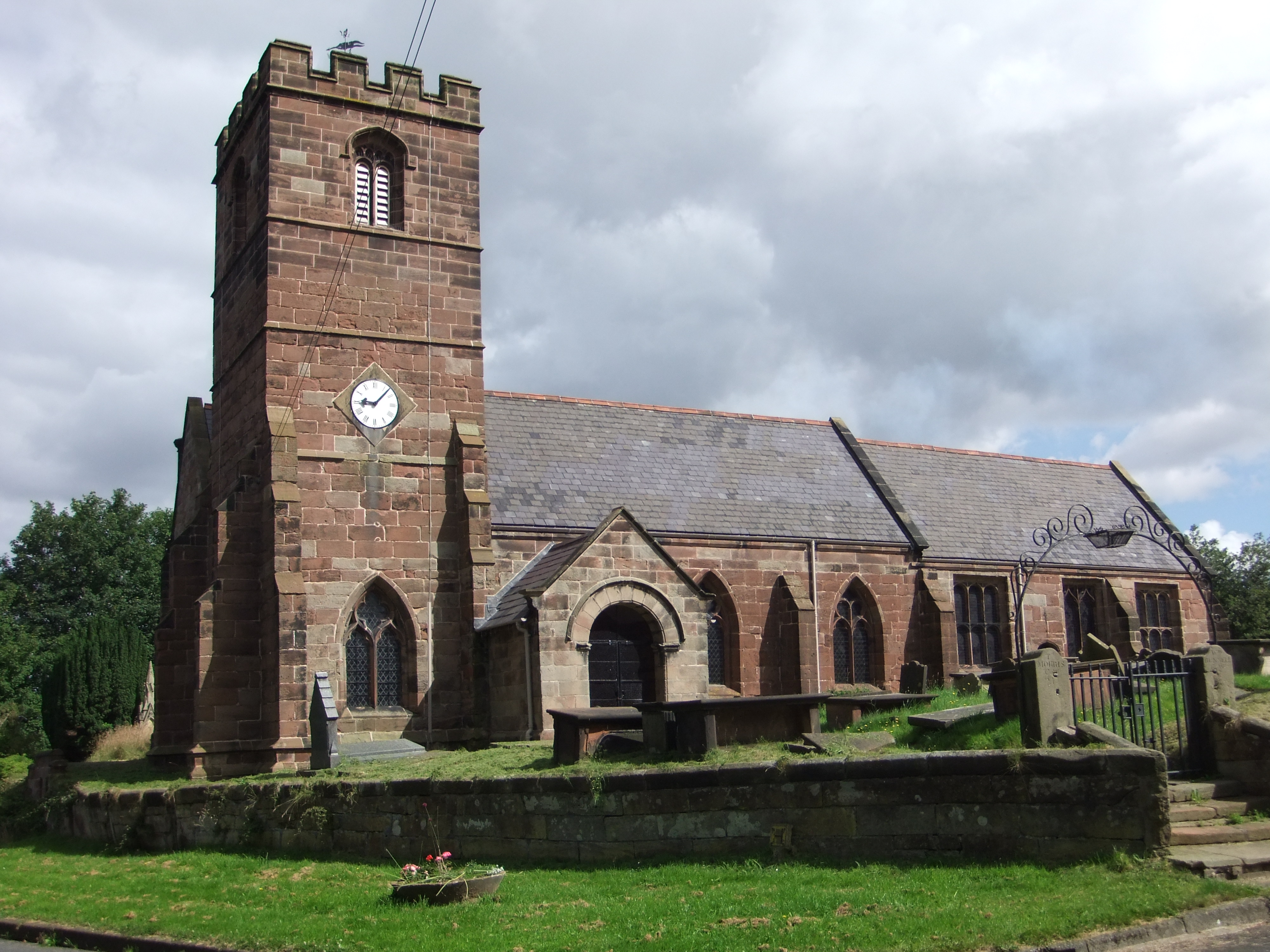
- St Mary's Church, Thornton-le-Moors, from the south

- Location in Cheshire
- OS grid reference: SJ 442 746
- Location: Thornton-le-Moors, Cheshire
- Country: England
- Denomination: Anglican
- Website: Churches Conservation Trust

Architecture
- Functional status: Redundant
- Heritage designation: Grade I
- Designated: 1 June 1967
- Architectural type: Church
- Style: Gothic
- Closed: 2002

Specifications
- Materials: Red sandstone, slate roofs

St Mary's Church is a redundant Anglican church in the small village of Thornton-le-Moors, Cheshire, England. The church is recorded in the National Heritage List for England as a designated Grade I listed building, and it is in the care of the Churches Conservation Trust.

== History ==
A chapel was present on the site in Saxon times and is recorded in the Domesday Book. It was formerly dedicated to Saint Helen. The nave, chancel and south aisle of the present church date from the 14th century as does the south door. A chapel, the Elton Chapel, was added in the 16th century. The tower also dates from this time; it was damaged by fire in 1909 and was largely rebuilt in 1910. A south porch was added in the late 17th century. The nave and chancel were originally undivided but an arch was added in the 19th century. A restoration was carried out in 1878. The church closed in 2002 and was vested in the Churches Conservation Trust in September 2009. Repairs and restoration have cost £350,000, and the church is now open for visitors and community use.

== Architecture ==
=== Exterior ===
The church is built in red sandstone with slate roofs. The plan consists of a nave of five bays, and three-bay chancel with a south aisle and a south porch. To the west of the aisle and incorporated in the church is the tower. The three-bay Elton Chapel is to the east of the aisle.

=== Interior ===
The chancel retains its medieval hammerbeam roof but the roof of the nave was replaced in pitch pine in the 1878 restoration. The chancel is panelled with oak which had previously been used for the pews. An oak screen is between the chancel and the chapel. The organ has been placed at the west end of the chapel and the rest of it is used as a clergy vestry. The altar rails are dated 1694 and are on three sides of the altar. The altar table is also dated 1694. A medieval piscina is in the wall of the aisle. In the vestry is a small church chest and two sanctuary chairs dating from the early 17th century. There are two fonts, both probably from the 17th century. One of these, which is octagonal, was used for a time as a vase in a local garden. On the walls are monuments to local landowners and 11 painted memorial panels and hatchments. It is thought that some of these may be by members of the Randle Holme family of Chester. The parish registers begin in 1574 but are incomplete between 1682 and 1688. There is a ring of four bells cast by John Taylor and Company in 1909.

== External features ==
Some of the walls of the churchyard and gate piers are listed Grade II, as is a table tomb in the churchyard. Also in the churchyard is a sundial with an octagonal shaft dated 1754. In addition the churchyard contains the war grave of a First World War soldier of the King's Liverpool Regiment.

== See also ==
- Grade I listed buildings in Cheshire West and Chester
- Grade I listed churches in Cheshire
- Listed buildings in Thornton-le-Moors
- List of churches preserved by the Churches Conservation Trust in Northern England
