= Alvanley =

Village in Cheshire, England

Coordinates: 53.261°N 2.756°W

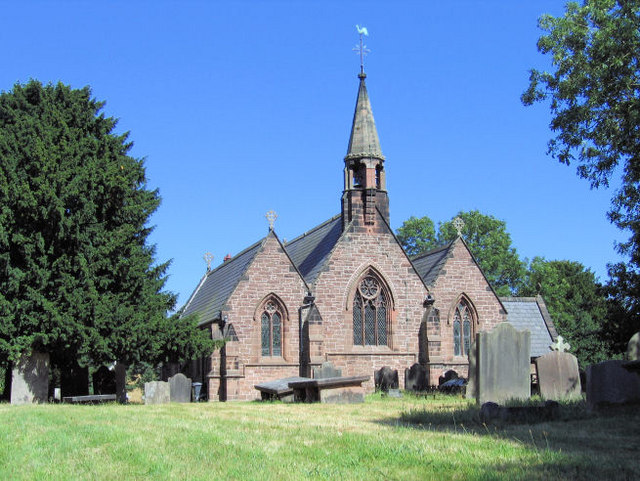
- St John's Church, Alvanley

- Location within Cheshire
- Population: 472 (2011 census)
- OS grid reference: SJ496741
- Civil parish: Alvanley
- Unitary authority: Cheshire West and Chester
- Ceremonial county: Cheshire
- Region: North West
- Country: England
- Sovereign state: United Kingdom
- Post town: FRODSHAM
- Postcode district: WA6
- Dialling code: 01928
- Police: Cheshire
- Fire: Cheshire
- Ambulance: North West
- UK Parliament: Runcorn and Helsby

Alvanley is a small rural village and civil parish near Helsby, in the unitary authority of Cheshire West and Chester and the ceremonial county of Cheshire, England. The village is on the B5393 road and near junction 14 of the M56 motorway. According to the 2011 census the civil parish had a population of 472.

== History ==
The name means 'Aelfwald's wood/clearing', derived from an Old English personal name and the word lēah (a forest, wood, glade or clearing).

The village is mentioned in the Domesday Book of 1086 as Elvedelie, under the ownership of Earl Hugh of Chester and consisting of only three households (one villager and two smallholders).

The population was recorded over time as 314 in 1801, 312 in 1851, 319 in 1901, 287 in 1951 and had reached 485 by the 2001 census.

== Governance ==
Alvanley was a township in Frodsham parish of the Eddisbury Hundred, which became a civil parish in 1866. From 1875 Alvanley was part of the Runcorn Rural Sanitary District, then Runcorn Rural District from 1894. Local government reorganisation on 1 April 1974 transferred the civil parish into the Borough of Vale Royal, which was superseded by the unitary authority of Cheshire West & Chester on 1 April 2009.

Alvanley is within the Runcorn and Helsby parliamentary constituency.

== Community ==
The village has a primary school, a public house (the White Lion) and a Grade II listed parish church dedicated to St John. Alvanley Hall is a Grade II* listed farmhouse to the south-east of the main village, dating mainly from the 17th century.

== Sport ==
Alvanley Cricket Club, established in 1884, runs five senior teams and four junior teams ranging from under-9s to under-18s. The club came fifth in Division One of the Cheshire County League in 2000, but a fallow period saw them fall back down to the Meller Braggins League. In 2011 the club won the League unbeaten with a record 461 points and in doing so found their way back into the County League for 2012. The Junior Section has in recent years begun to challenge for County Cups, without yet actually lifting one. 2008 to 2011 saw a period of investment in the club's infrastructure, rewarded by the award of prestigious games such as the Bunbury Festival and Cheshire County fixtures.

== See also ==
- Listed buildings in Alvanley
