= Listed buildings in Thornton-le-Moors =

Thornton-le-Moors is a civil parish in Cheshire West and Chester, England. It contains nine buildings recorded in the National Heritage List for England as designated listed buildings. Of these, one is listed at Grade I, the highest of the three grades, and the others are at Grade II, the lowest grade. Apart from the village of Thornton-le-Moors, the parish is rural, other than the area north of the A5117 road, which is occupied by an oil refinery. The listed buildings consist of the village church and associated structures, houses, farmhouses, and farm buildings.

== Key ==
Grade	Criteria
I	Buildings of exceptional interest, sometimes considered to be internationally important
II	Buildings of national importance and special interest

== Buildings ==
Name and location	Photograph	Date	Notes	Grade
St Mary's Church; 53.2650°N 2.8387°W		14th century	St Mary's built is in red sandstone and has slate roofs. The nave, chancel, south aisle, and south door date from the 14th century, the Elton Chapel and the tower being added in the 16th century. A restoration was carried out in 1878. The top of the tower was damaged by fire in 1909 and was largely rebuilt in 1910. The church closed in 2002 and is in the care of the Churches Conservation Trust.	I
Thornton Hall; 53.2653°N 2.8371°W	—	17th century	The farmhouse was remodelled in the 18th century, and a wing was added to the rear during the 19th century. It is built in brick, partly pebbledashed, with a slate roof, and is in two storeys. The windows are casements. On the front is a trellised porch.	II
Barn, Thornton Hall; 53.2657°N 2.8367°W	—	Late 17th to early 18th century (probable)	The barn was altered later. It is in brick, is partly rendered, and has a steeply pitched slate roof. Each side has an entrance for vehicles, and there are five openings in the upper storey.	II
Glebe Farmhouse; 53.2650°N 2.8374°W	—	Late 17th to early 18th century	A brick farmhouse with a slate roof. It has two storeys with attics in the gables and a five-bay front. At the top of the farmhouse is a cornice. The windows are casements. Above the doorway is a rectangular fanlight. To the left of the farmhouse is a 19th-century shippon.	II
Yew Tree House; 53.2641°N 2.8363°W	—	Early 18th century	The house is in limewashed brick on a rendered plinth, with stone dressings and a slate roof. It is in two storeys with attics and cellars. The windows are sashes, those in the ground floor having rusticated voussoirs and keystones. Six steps lead up to the entrance, which has a Doric doorcase with a pediment and a pulvinated frieze.	II
Table tomb, St Mary's Church; 53.26495°N 2.83837°W	—	1726	The table tomb is to the memory of John Davies of Dunham. It has a sandstone base, with pedestals supporting the table top, the latter carrying an inscription between fluted columns in relief. There is also a carving of a symbolic dove.	II
Churchyard wall and gate piers, St Mary's Church; 53.26526°N 2.83775°W	—	18th century	The walls and gate piers date from several builds in the 18th and 19th centuries. They are in stone and the walls stand up to about 4 feet (1.2 m) high. The gate piers are decoratively plain, and are carved with the names of churchwardens, initials, and an indistinct date.	II
Church Farmhouse and cottage 53.2659°N 2.8383°W	—	Late 18th century (probable)	The farmhouse and attached cottage were remodelled in about 1850. They are in rendered brick on a stone plinth, with stone dressings and slate roofs. The farmhouse is in three storeys, the cottage to the left is in two storeys, and the whole building has an L-shaped plan. The windows are sashes.	II
Church House Farmhouse and shippon 53.2641°N 2.8367°W	—	Late 18th or early 19th century	The farmhouse and shippon are in brick with slate roofs, and are in two storeys. The windows of the house are casements. In the shippon is one rectangular window and ventilation holes in a diamond pattern. At the rear are a pitch hole and a loading door.	II
