= Manley, Cheshire =

Village in Cheshire, England

Coordinates: 53.239°N 2.737°W

Manley
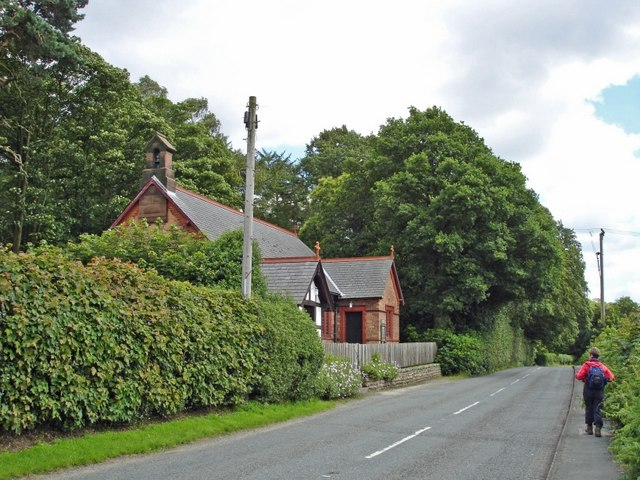
- St. John's Church, Manley

- Location within Cheshire
- Population: 614 (2011)
- OS grid reference: SJ508716
- Civil parish: Manley
- Unitary authority: Cheshire West and Chester
- Ceremonial county: Cheshire
- Region: North West
- Country: England
- Sovereign state: United Kingdom
- Post town: FRODSHAM
- Postcode district: WA6
- Dialling code: 01928
- Police: Cheshire
- Fire: Cheshire
- Ambulance: North West
- UK Parliament: Runcorn and Helsby

Manley is a village and civil parish in the unitary authority of Cheshire West and Chester (formerly Vale Royal) and the ceremonial county of Cheshire, in the north west of England.

Manley had a quarry which claimed to produce white building stone of the same quality as that used to build Eaton Hall and Chester Castle. When the railway came through the quarry was connected to it via a rail siding close to Manley Station - which was one of the shortest lived passenger stations, opening on 22 June 1870 and closing for passengers on 1 May 1875, though it remained open for goods traffic. The quarry sidings closed around 1910, though the track remained in use for freight traffic until 1991.

The population at the 2011 census was 614.

The television writer and novelist Cyril Abraham, who created the popular BBC drama The Onedin Line, lived in Manley until his death.

== See also ==
- Listed buildings in Manley, Cheshire
- Manley Knoll
