= Chester services =

Motorway service area in Cheshire, England

Chester Services
- Location within Cheshire

Information
- County: Cheshire
- Road: M56
- Coordinates: 53.2648°N 2.8036°W
- Operator: Roadchef
- Date opened: 1998
- Website: www.roadchef.com/locations/chester

Chester services is a motorway service area on the M56 motorway in Cheshire, England. The site is approximately 10 mi (16 km) from Chester city centre. Operated by Roadchef, it is the only motorway service area on the M56.

== History ==
The site was originally planned as Hapsford services in mid-November 1969, when proposed as a 28-acre site, three quarters mile from Elton Green. It was hoped to be open by late 1973.

The proposals were scaled back to a basic rest or picnic area owned by the Department for Transport. Opened in 1978, the 'picnic' area lacked facilities and consisted of just a car park.

After a previous proposal came to nothing, the planning and development of the site into a motorway services area was undertaken by Shell from 1995. A particular difficulty in designing the layout of the site was an extant electricity pylon and overhead power lines. The services were fully operational from 1998. The main building was extended and refurbished in 2016.

== Location ==
Accessed from Junction 14 of the M56 and also signed for Stanlow and Helsby, the services are located around 10 mi (16 km) from Chester city centre. The site is also accessible from the A5117 which intersects at the same junction. The village of Elton is to the immediate north west and the village of Hapsford is situated to the south east.

After Chester services there are no further motorway services westbound on the M56, or on the nearby M53 motorway.

Previous: Lymm	Motorway service stations on the M56 motorway	Next: none
