= Elton, Cheshire =

Village in Cheshire, England

Coordinates: 53°16′36″N 2°49′01″W

Elton
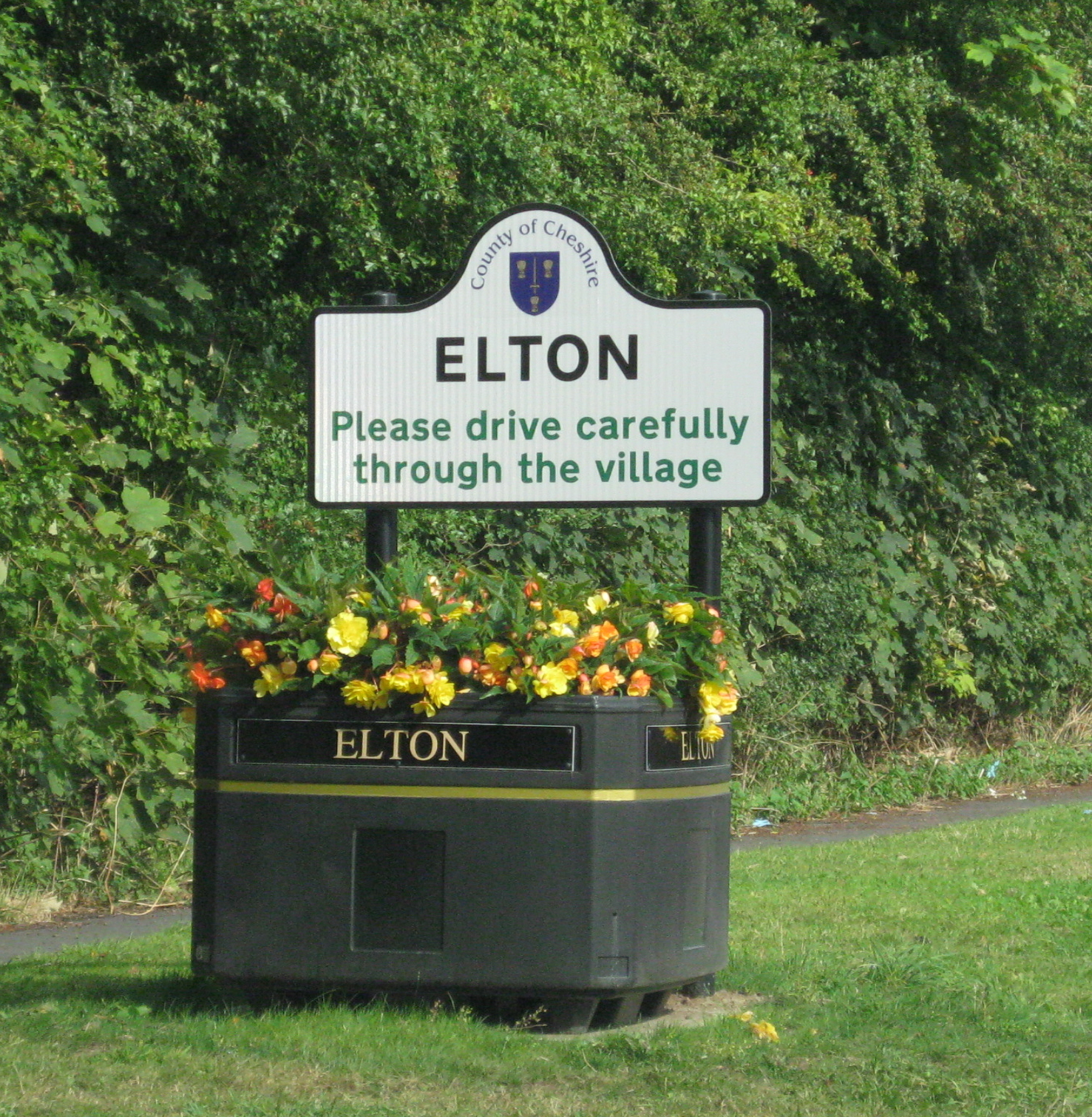
- Sign on Station Road

- Location within Cheshire
- Population: 3,586 (2011 census)
  - Density: 2,353 people per square kilometer
- OS grid reference: SJ456758
- Civil parish: Elton
- Unitary authority: Cheshire West and Chester
- Ceremonial county: Cheshire
- Region: North West
- Country: England
- Sovereign state: United Kingdom
- Post town: CHESTER
- Postcode district: CH2
- Dialling code: 01928
- Police: Cheshire
- Fire: Cheshire
- Ambulance: North West
- UK Parliament: Runcorn and Helsby

Elton is a village and civil parish in Cheshire West and Chester, Cheshire, England, 13 km (8.1 mi) northeast of Chester, between Helsby and Ellesmere Port, near the River Mersey. Its proximity to the Mersey and the Manchester Ship Canal have contributed to its industrial character. The village is on the north-western edge of the Cheshire Plain, 1 1/2 miles (2.4 km) from Stanlow Refinery.

At the 2011 census, the village had a population of 3,586.

== History ==
The name of the village was recorded in the Domesday Book as Eltone, derived from the words ēl and tūn, meaning "eel farm or settlement".

Elton was a township within the Thornton parish of the Eddisbury Hundred. It became a civil parish in 1866. The population was recorded at 167 in 1801, 216 in 1851, 190 in 1901, 410 in 1951 and rising to 3,528 by 2001.

The village was briefly in the media spotlight in 1997 when one of its residents, Louise Woodward, went on trial for murder in the USA.

== Governance ==
The unitary authority of Cheshire West and Chester replaced Chester City Council and Cheshire County Council on 1 April 2009. Elton is within the electoral ward of Gowy Rural. At the time of the 2011 census, the village was part of a ward of the same name, which stretched as far west as Little Stanney. The total recorded population in 2011 was 4,557.

From 1983 to 2024, Elton formed part of the Ellesmere Port and Neston parliamentary constituency. Following the 2023 review of Westminster constituencies, it became part of the Runcorn and Helsby constituency.

== Transport ==
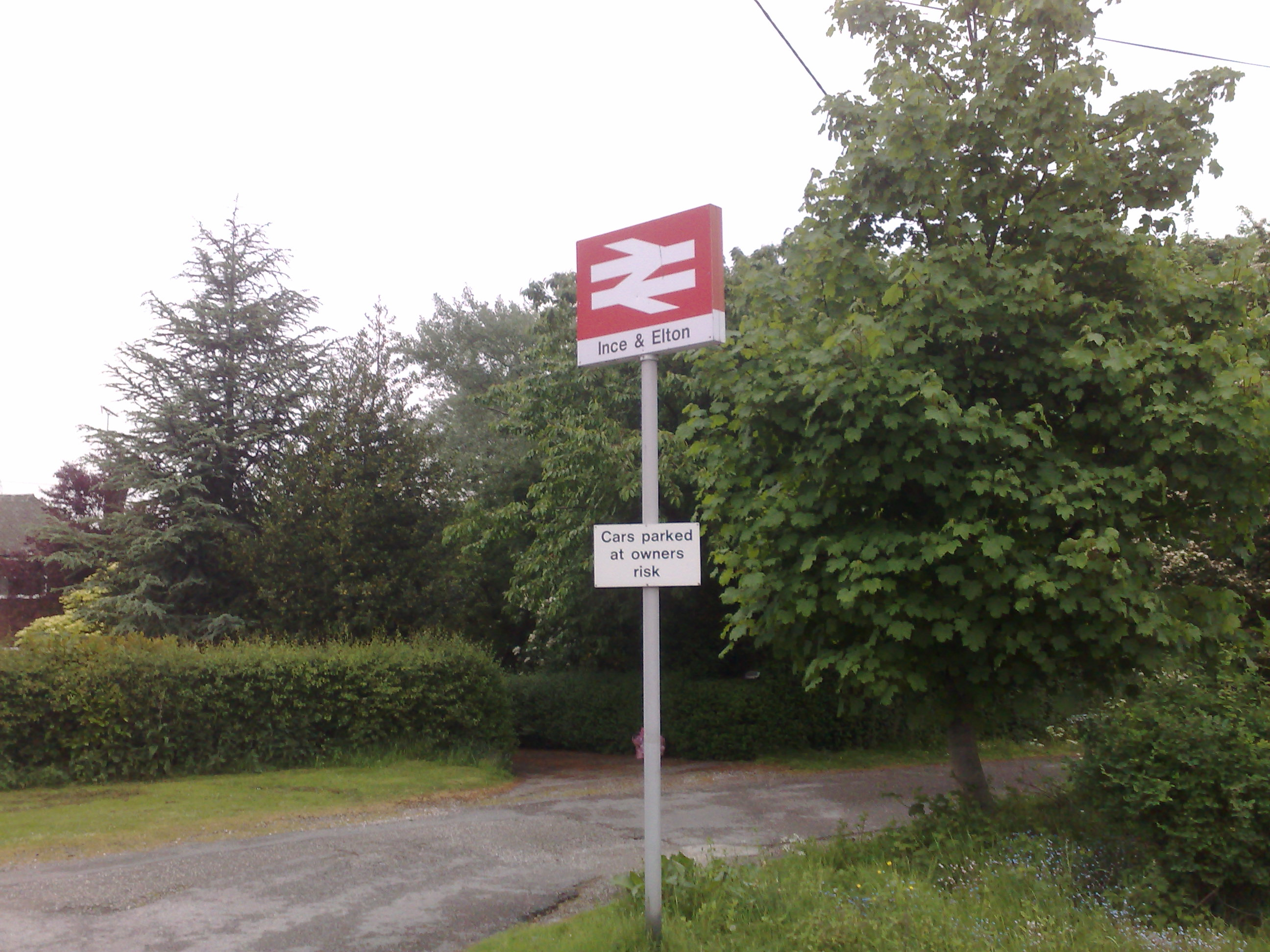
Ince & Elton railway station, serving both Ince and Elton villages

Ince & Elton railway station serves both Ince and Elton villages. There are two services each way per day, Monday to Saturday, to Ellesmere Port, Helsby, Liverpool Lime Street, and Warrington Bank Quay. The nearest stations with more frequent services are in Ellesmere Port and Helsby.

The number X2 bus visits Elton hourly in each direction, which runs between Chester via Ellesmere Port to Runcorn Halton Lea bus station. This service is operated by Stagecoach Merseyside & South Lancashire. Elton also has a few morning and evening journeys on service DB8 to and from Chester Business Park.

Public transport in Elton is supported by the North Cheshire Rail User Group. It campaigns for better rail services and improved public transport interchange.

The nearest motorways are the M56 and the M53, and the local road, the A5117, links Elton to North Wales.

== Economy and industry ==
To the west of Elton is Stanlow Refinery, an Essar Energy facility and the second largest oil refinery in the United Kingdom. The refinery produces one-sixth of the United Kingdom's petrol needs.

Opening in 2005, 160 acres (65 ha) of the former Ince Power Station site was redeveloped as part of a large glass bottle production factory operated by Encirc Ltd (formerly Quinn Glass until 2014). The facility initially contained two glass melting furnaces and 13 bottle production lines. It was estimated that £250 million was invested in this project, and the factory produced 1.2 billion bottles per year. In 2020, Encirc opened the world's largest container glass furnace, capable of processing up to 900 tonnes per day.

North east of the village, landowners The Peel Group are developing a 130 acres (54 ha) industrial site on a former water meadow at Ince Park. The Protos "energy and resource hub" houses a biomass power station, a timber recycling plant and designated "nature areas". The construction of a facility to recover energy from non-recyclable waste began in 2020.

== See also ==
- Listed buildings in Elton, Cheshire
