= M53 motorway =

Motorway in England

M53

- M53 highlighted in blue Shown in North West England Shown with the UK motorway network

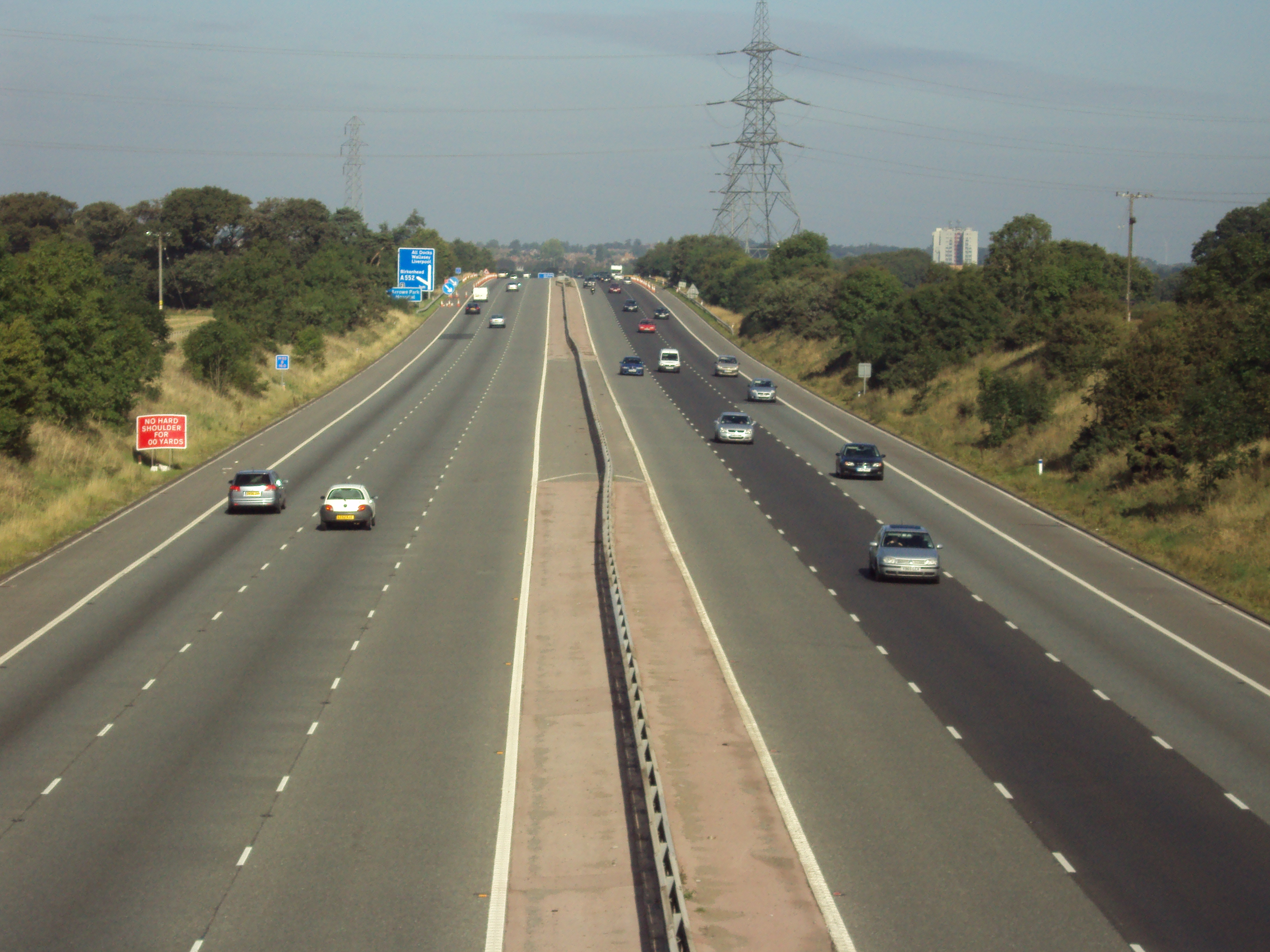
- Looking north near Storeton, 2009

Route information
- Maintained by National Highways
- Length: 18.9 mi (30.4 km)
- Existed: 1972–present
- History: Opened: 1972; Completed: 1982

Major junctions
- North end: Bidston; 53.41°N 3.08°W
- J11 → M56 motorway
- South end: Hoole Village; 53.21°N 2.86°W

Location
- Country: United Kingdom
- Counties: Merseyside, Cheshire
- Primary destinations: Wallasey; Birkenhead; Ellesmere Port; Chester

Road network
- Roads in the United Kingdom; Motorways; A and B road zones
← M50	→ M54

The M53 is an 18.9-mile-long (30.4 km) motorway in the Metropolitan Borough of Wirral, Merseyside and the borough of Cheshire West and Chester, Cheshire on the Wirral Peninsula in England. It is also referred to as the Mid Wirral Motorway. It runs between the Kingsway Tunnel, at Wallasey in the north, and the A55 at Chester.

The main reason for the motorway was to provide a through route to the new Mersey Road Tunnel, Kingsway, which was built at the same time. Part of this motorway was originally the M531.

== Route ==
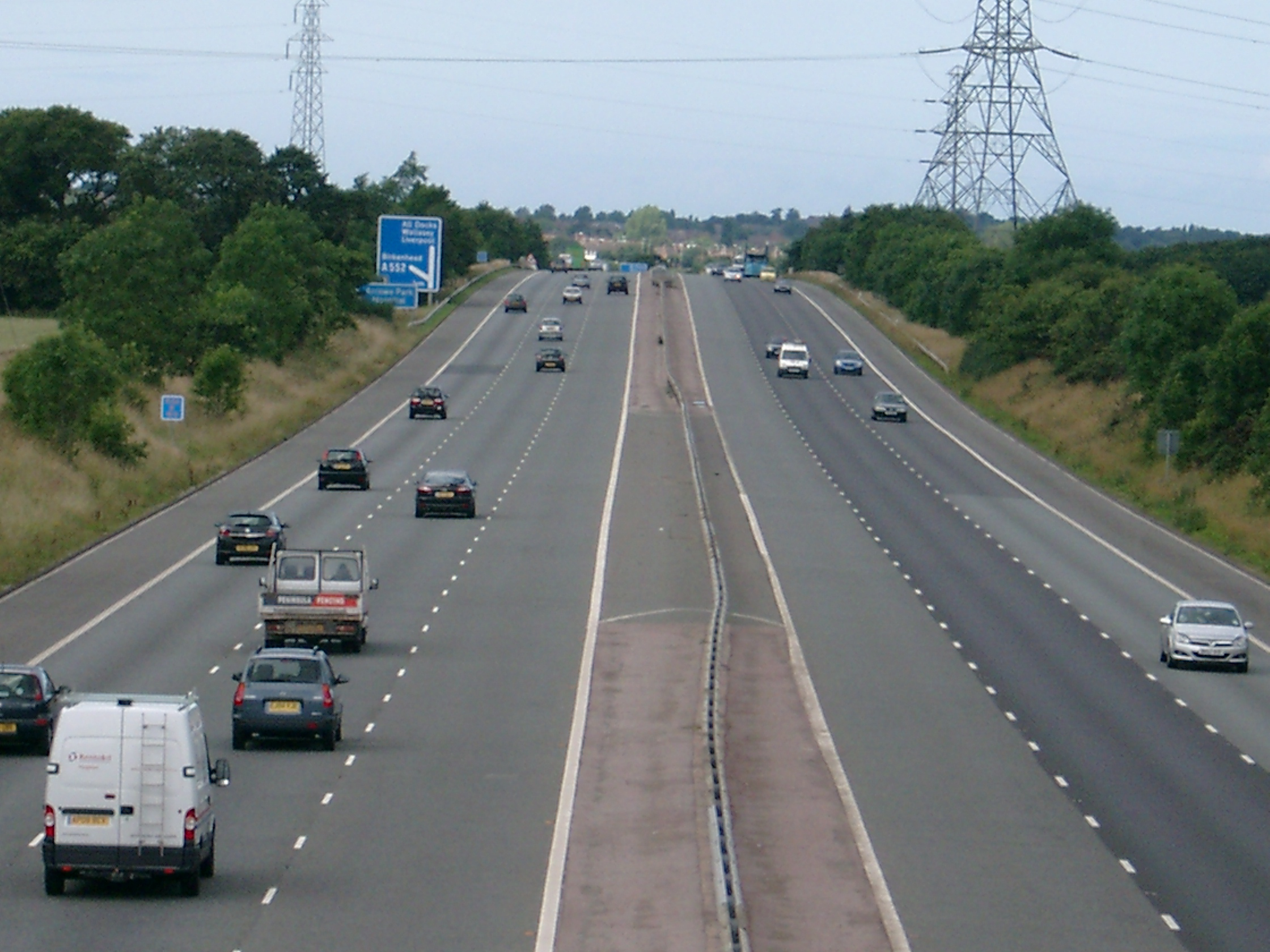
Looking northwards, midway between junctions 3 and 4 at Storeton

Starting at the northern end, the motorway starts in Wallasey at the exit slip roads from the Kingsway Tunnel from Liverpool. It loops round the north west of Birkenhead and then runs south as a dual three-lane route between Upton, Woodchurch in the west and Prenton. From junctions 1 to 3 it runs parallel to the Borderlands railway line. It crosses this line south of junction 3. From this junction it proceeds south to the west of Bebington through junction 4 and then further south for 4 miles (6.4 km) (where it crosses the Wirral railway line), before narrowing to dual two-lane and turning sharply to the east. At junction 5, traffic for Wales can take the A41, A550 and A494 to join the A55 near Ewloe. The road passes north and then east of Hooton, then to the east of Overpool and Wolverham and with Ellesmere Port to the west.

South of junction 10 the route enters a more rural setting, passing under the M56 motorway at junction 11. Finally, it heads south and becomes the A55 North Wales Expressway at junction 12.

== History ==
This motorway was originally two separate projects, the M53 and M531. The M53 was originally proposed to run from the Kingsway Tunnel to Backford. The M531 would have run from a point just west of the current junction 5 and provided a connection with the M56 for eastbound travel.

When the M53 was first planned in the early 1960s, it was designed as a route to connect the two Mersey road tunnels with the A55 trunk road on the Welsh border, giving Liverpool and the rest of Merseyside a direct link with Chester and the towns on the North Wales coast.

In the event, the A55 link was never built and instead the M531 (by-passing the eastern side of Chester) was incorporated into the M53.

=== M531 ===
The first section of the M531 was built to improve access to the Vauxhall Ellesmere Port facility. It was opened in 1968 as a non-designated road. Subsequently this road was extended further south to meet the A5117 and was designated as the M531. In March 1981, the M531 was lengthened to meet the M56 and at this stage the whole route was redesignated as the M53.

=== M53 ===
Construction on the M53 started in 1969. The Alfred McAlpine-Fairclough consortium was given a £11.6m contract for 10 miles in July 1969.

It was to be built in stages as part of a strategic route to North Wales for traffic from Merseyside. The route to North Wales was unresolved as there was even an option to run due west from south of junction 4 and cross the River Dee on a barrage. This first section from the tunnel to junction 5, where it connected straight into the Vauxhall Motors road, was opened by Lord Leverhulme in a ceremony at Hooton on 1 February 1972. A junction was partially built to allow extension of the motorway further south west, around 1 mile (1.6 km) west of junction 5. The unbuilt motorway would have provided a bypass of the A41 and would likely have terminated on the M56, though exactly where is unknown. The unfinished junction for this extension has now been demolished.

The final section of the M53 provided a link to Chester from the M56 and was opened in 1982. No plans are known to exist to complete the originally planned M53.

=== Dates ===
- Junctions 1 to 5 were opened in 1972
- Junctions 5 to 8 were redesignated as motorway in 1974 as part of the M531
- Junctions 8 to 10 opened in 1975 as part of the M531
- Junctions 10 to 11 were opened in 1981
- Junctions 11 to 12 were opened in 1982

== Incidents ==
=== Coach crash ===
On 29 September 2023, a coach overturned and crashed in the M53 motorway coach crash. Jessica Baker, a 15-year-old schoolgirl, and the driver, Stephen Shrimpton, both died in the crash.

== Junctions ==
M53 motorway junctions
mile	km	Northbound exits (B carriageway)	Junction	Southbound exits (A carriageway)
0.0	0.0	End of motorway Road continues as Wallasey Tunnel towards Liverpool	J1	Birkenhead, New Brighton, Wallasey A5139 (A554); Non-motorway traffic
		Birkenhead A5139	J1	Start of motorway
		Wallasey, Birkenhead A554	J1	
6.5	10.5	Hoylake, West Kirby (A551)	J2	Hoylake, West Kirby (A551)
8.6	13.8	Birkenhead A552	J3	Birkenhead, Heswall A552
11.7	18.8	Clatterbridge, Heswall, Bebington A5137	J4	Bebington, Bromborough, Clatterbridge, Neston A5137
15.8	25.4	Birkenhead, Queensferry A41	J5	NORTH WALES, Queensferry, Eastham A41
16.2	26.1	Entering Merseyside	J6	Vauxhall (Cars Only), Eastham Oil Terminal
16.2	26.1	Vauxhall (Cars Only), Eastham Oil Terminal	J6	Entering Cheshire
17.5	28.2	Overpool, Whitby, North Road Industrial Estate B5132	J7	Overpool, Whitby, North Road Industrial Estate B5132
18.3	29.5	Netherpool and Rossmore Industrial Estates, Docks	J8	Netherpool and Rossmore Industrial Estates, Docks
19.1	30.7	Ellesmere Port (Centre), Boat Museum A5032	J9	Ellesmere Port (Centre), Stanlow, Boat Museum A5032
20.9	33.7	Queensferry, Stanlow A5117	J10	Queensferry, Stanlow A5117
21.6	34.8	Runcorn, Liverpool, Warrington, (M6), Manchester M56	J11	Runcorn, Warrington, (M6), Manchester M56
24.5	39.5	Start of motorway	J12	Chester A56
24.9	40.1	Chester, Helsby A56; Non-motorway traffic	J12	End of motorway Road continues as A55 towards North Wales
Moreton Spur
		End of motorway West Kirby A551 (B5139); Moreton A551, Hoylake (A553)	J2A	Moreton A551, Hoylake (A553)
		Upton A551	J2A	Start of motorway (Moreton Spur)
1.000 mi = 1.609 km; 1.000 km = 0.621 mi: Incomplete access

Data from driver location signs is used to provide distance and carriageway identifier information.

Notes

1. 1: Signed as 'All Docks'.

== Traffic counts ==
Section	Capacity	AADT (2019)		Count point data
J1-J2	D3	77,684	▲	46040
J2-J2A (Moreton Spur)	D2	43,788	▲	56042
J2-J3	D3	65,764	▲	6045
J3-J4	D3	70,602	▲	75457
J4-J5	D3	60,257	▲	16041
J5-J6	D3	73,717	▲	26063
J6-J7	D2	53,795	▲	46059
J7-J8	D2	71,378	▲	16060
J8-J9	D2	77,609	▲	36063
J9-J10	D2	66,522	▼	56062
J10-J11	D3	79,872	▲	27872
J11-J12	D2	69,147	▲	75190

== M53 Divide ==
The M53 is seen as an east–west divide between the affluent and developing areas of the Wirral.

== Culture ==
A full-sized replica of one of the motorway's bridges forms part of the exhibition O' Magic Power of Bleakness by Mark Leckey at Tate Britain (September 2019 – January 2020).

== See also ==
- List of motorways in the United Kingdom
- Wirral Line
- A41 road
