= Lehane, Mackenzie and Shand =

British civil engineering and construction company

- Industry: Construction
- Fate: Merger
- Headquarters: Shand House, Derbyshire, DE4 3AF
- Products: Motorways, bridges

Lehane, Mackenzie and Shand was a British civil engineering and construction company, and responsible for some of Scotland's bridges.

== History ==
Lehane Mackenzie & Shand Ltd was incorporated on 8 April 1974. In February 1981, the Alexander Shand group of companies was bought for £24.8m by Charter Consolidated. In 1989, the company was acquired by and subsequently integrated into Morrison Construction. The Shand business was officially dissolved in October 2012.

== Structure ==
Its main headquarters was south of Rowsley in Derbyshire, on the A6 road. Derbyshire County Council has a site in the former headquarters. The company was a subsidiary of Alexander Shand (Holdings) Ltd. Alexander Shand was a former President of the Federation of Civil Engineering Contractors, and made a CBE in the 1984 New Year Honours.

=== Gas pipelines ===
It had a pipeline division on Kiln Lane in Immingham; this became MK-Shand, when merged with M.K. River Constructie Maatschappij of the Netherlands, and built gas pipelines for the Gas Council in the early 1970s.

== Major projects ==
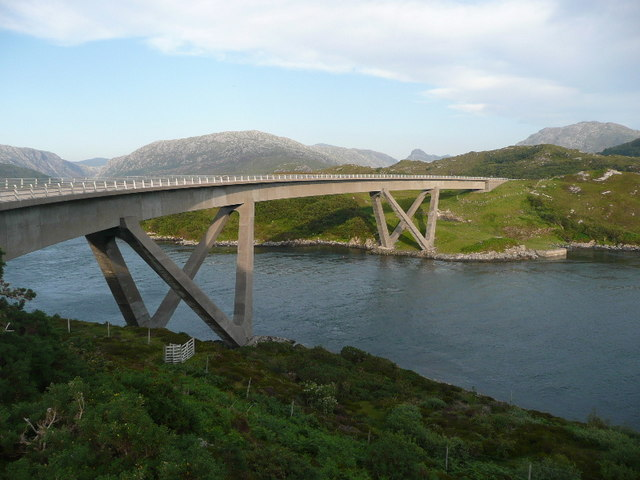
Kylesku Bridge in June 2009

=== Roads ===
- Park Lane in London (built as Cubitts and Fitzpatrick with Shand) completed in 1963
- The A64(M) Leeds Inner Ring Road motorway, completed in 1969
- M1, Beechtrees to Berrygrove, junctions 7 to 5, (built as Cubitts and Fitzpatrick with Shand) completed in 1959
- M5, junctions 8-9 (M50) to Tewkesbury, (built as Christiani-Shand) completed in 1970
- M56 Preston Brook to Hapsford in Cheshire, (built as Christiani-Shand) completed in 1970
- M6 Ansty to M1 at Catthorpe, Contract A, (built as Christiani-Shand) completed in 1971
- M6 north of Tebay (junction 38 for A685) to Thrimby (built as Christiani-Shand) completed in 1970
- M74 Larkhall to Uddingston (built as Christiani-Shand) completed in 1966
- Cardiff to Merthyr Tydfil A470, £5m first stage from Whitchurch bypass to Nantgarw, 3.25 miles (built as Christiani-Shand) completed in 1971

=== Bridges ===
- M56 Weaver Viaduct, (built as Christiani-Shand) completed in 1971
- The foundations and piers for the Erskine Bridge, (A898), West Dunbartonshire and Renfrewshire, (built as Christiani-Shand) opened July 1971
- Kylesku Bridge (A894), Sutherland, opened July 1984

=== Reservoirs ===
- Errwood Reservoir completed in 1967
- Llandegfedd Reservoir completed in 1965
