= Weaver Viaduct =

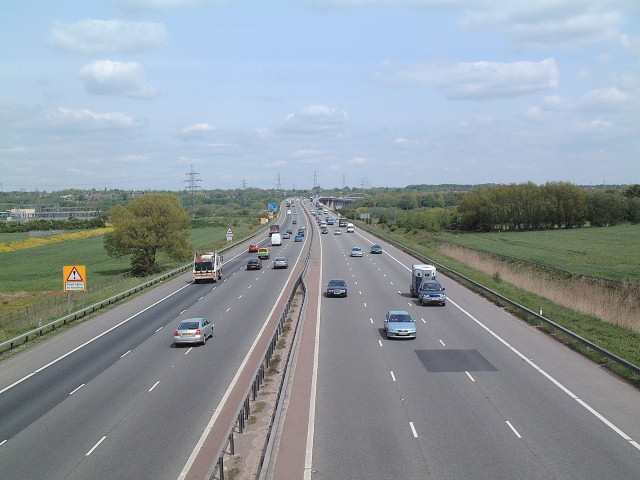
- View, looking east towards junction 12, in May 2005
- Coordinates: 53.31°N 2.71°W
- OS grid reference: SJ527794
- Carries: 6 lanes of M56
- Crosses: River Weaver; Weaver Navigation
- Locale: Frodsham, Cheshire
- Maintained by: National Highways

Characteristics
- Design: Box girder bridge
- Material: Reinforced concrete
- Total length: 3,186 ft (971 m)
- Longest span: 222 ft (68 m)
- No. of spans: 33
- Clearance above: 60 feet
- No. of lanes: 3 each direction Slip roads on the eastern end

History
- Designer: Husband and Company
- Constructed by: Christiani-Shand
- Construction start: 1 April 1968
- Construction end: February 1971
- Construction cost: £3.2m
- Opened: Sunday 21 February 1971

Statistics
- Daily traffic: 112,185 (2017)

Location in Cheshire
Location in UK motorway network

The Weaver Viaduct, in the north of Cheshire on the M56, is one of the longest concrete viaducts on the British motorway network.

== History ==
It was built as part of the first section of the M56 North Cheshire Motorway, also initially known as the Cheshire East-West Motorway, five miles from junctions 14 Hapsford Interchange to 12 at the A557.

The contract was given in early March 1968, to be finished by September 1970, to the Christiani-Shand consortium (its headquarters were at Romney House, on Marsham Street in London) for £3,146,387.

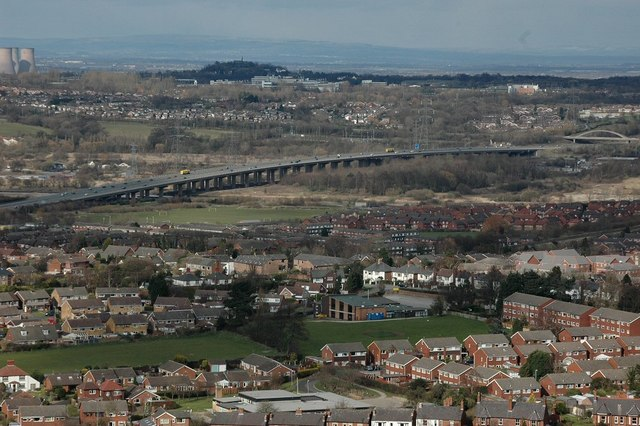
View in March 2008

=== Design ===
It was designed from 1964 to 1967. It was designed by Husband and Company Consulting Engineers of Sheffield.

=== Construction ===
Work started on the viaduct on 1 April 1968. Work began on the eight-mile motorway in December 1968. The bridge crosses a flood plain. The foundations had 2,376 reinforced concrete piles. Thirty two 125-foot concrete 100-tonne beams were put into place in July 1970; the concrete beams were made by Matthews & Mumby of Windmill Lane, Denton, Greater Manchester. The project manager for Christiani-Shand was Mr A.K. Robertson.

31-year-old Harry Russon was killed instantly on the bridge construction on Wednesday 6 August 1969.

The construction of the five-mile motorway was completed in December 1970. The five-mile motorway opened for traffic at 11am on Sunday 21 February 1971; the viaduct would open with hard shoulders; the Thelwall Viaduct on the M6 was not originally built with a hard shoulder. The section to Preston Brook at junction 11 opened on Thursday 23 September 1971.

== Structure ==
Due to its position, on the eastern edge of the exposed Cheshire Plain, there can be high crosswinds over the bridge, and the bridge may be closed as a result. Many high-sided vehicles have had accidents on the bridge.

It has a 222 ft span over the River Weaver and a 125 ft span over the Weaver Navigation. There are 30 approach spans of 90 ft each.
