= A5117 road =

Road in England

A5117

Route information
- Maintained by Cheshire West and Chester Council

Major junctions
- West end: Mollington
- A494 road M56 motorway A41 road A5032 road B5132 road M53 motorway B5132 road M56 motorway A56 road
- East end: Hapsford

Location
- Country: United Kingdom
- Counties: Cheshire
- Primary destinations: Ellesmere Port

Road network
- Roads in the United Kingdom; Motorways; A and B road zones

The A5117 is a road in Cheshire, England. It runs between Shotwick (53.2374°N 2.9875°W) and Helsby (53.2613°N 2.7814°W) and connects the A550 at Woodbank to the M56. As such it forms a northerly bypass to Chester and a shorter route between the North West and North Wales than the A55.

== History ==
The road, which was originally known as the "Shotwick – Helsby Bypass", was completed in the mid-1930s. The construction was contemporaneous to other major transport projects in the region such as the East Lanc Road and the opening of the first Mersey tunnel. The road was envisaged to become part of a link that connected the A56 from Manchester to North Wales via the Jubilee Bridge at Queensferry, Flintshire. Several sections of the road were constructed in concrete. Vehicles experience an up and down vertical motion due to the need for "summit and valley" drainage as the road crosses the flood plain of the River Gowy. Poplar trees were planted along the road (most are now only adjacent to the short section passed Stanlow Refinery).

The new road was planned to be eventually incorporated into a dualled trunk road that would connect the North West of England with the industries of North Wales. However, with the outbreak of the Second World War, all major civil engineering projects were cancelled for the duration of conflict. In 1946 the Ministry of War Transport issued the Showing Future Pattern of Principal National Routes which called for a new type of highway that would be restricted to specified classes of vehicle; which led to the Special Roads Act 1949. In 1947 the first proposal for a motorway across north Cheshire was mooted in a report commissioned by Cheshire County Council, with a line for the route of the motorway being agreed in 1958 between the council and the Ministry of Transport and Civil Aviation. The first section, announced in November 1963 by the transport minister Ernest Marples, was a southwards extension of the Princess Parkway from Wythenshawe in Manchester to the A56 and A556 at Bowdon which entered the Trunk Road Programme for 1967/1968. Construction began in 1968, and the motorway opened in stages between 1971 and 1981:

By the late seventies, the M56 had approached the Helsby end of the A5117 road. Since the 1960s, the road had been marked out as a three-lane single carriageway, where the middle lane was known popularly as the "suicide" lane because overtaking vehicles drove towards each other at speed from both directions. Despite the original intention of the road's 1930 planners for it to be incorporated into a major highway (along its entire length, it was built with a wide width and setback bridge parapets for additional lanes, and extra drainage channels to accommodate a bigger road), when it came to building the final section of the M56 into North Wales, the road had been deemed obsolete and too costly to upgrade. Instead a new southerly route was chosen, which opened in 1981. The M56 crosses the Gowy on a purpose-built embankment made of sandstone before it reaches a new junction with the M53 at Stoak.

As the route of the M56 bypassed the A5117 road, it was relegated to a secondary route between the M56 and the A55. It continues to be used as an alternative to the motorway but for much of its length it remains single carriageway in both directions apart from a short duelled section near Elton, Cheshire.

== Current configurations ==
The road is dualled west of the M56. There is roundabout with the A540 and at Dunkirk at the western terminus of the M56. East of the junction the road is single carriageway and crosses the A41 by way of a roundabout at Backford Cross. The A5117 intersects the M53 at Junction 10. This junction is just east of Cheshire Oaks Designer Outlet. The road then continues almost parallel to the M56, which it intersects at Junction 14, at which there is a Motorway service area. The road then continues south east to terminate where it joins the A56 at Helsby.

The upgrading of the A5117 on a section west of the M56 motorway, Dunkirk roundabout to Sealand was started in 2006 because that section was regularly congested. The improvement converted the road to grade separated two-lane dual carriageway standard. The British Government at the time decided that a motorway standard M56 extension would be too environmentally damaging, and instead opted to utilise part of the existing road while providing off-line bypasses for all of the at-grade junctions. The improvements tied in with completed works over the Welsh border which upgraded the A550 to a standard similar to that of motorways. Work started in late 2006 and was completed in 2008.
