= Christiani & Nielsen =

Construction contractor

- Industry: Construction
- Founded: 1904
- Founder: Rudolf Christiani; Aage Nielsen
- Defunct: 2000 (continues to trade in Thailand)
- Fate: Administration
- Headquarters: Leamington Spa, Warwickshire
- Key people: Amorn Asvanunt (Chairman); Alan Crane (Managing Director)
- Products: Motorways, bridges

Christiani & Nielsen was a construction contractor with major operations worldwide. It still trades in Thailand.

== History ==
Christiani & Nielsen was established by Rudolf Christiani, a Danish civil engineer, and Aage Nielsen, a captain in the Royal Danish Navy, in Copenhagen, to build bridges, marine works, and other reinforced concrete structures, in 1904. It soon established a branch in Hamburg, and after the First World War, extended its operations to the United Kingdom, South America, Australia, and South Africa.

The company's business in Thailand was demerged on the Stock Exchange of Thailand in 1991 and continued operating under different ownership.

The main company went into administration in November 2000.

== Major projects ==
Major projects included:

=== Roads ===
- M5, junctions 8-9 (M50) to Tewkesbury, built as Christiani-Shand, completed in 1970
- M56 Preston Brook to Hapsford in Cheshire, built as Christiani-Shand, completed in 1970
- M6 Ansty to M1 at Catthorpe, Contract A, built as Christiani-Shand, completed in 1971
- M6 north of Tebay (junction 38 for A685) to Thrimby, built as Christiani-Shand, completed in 1970
- M74 Larkhall to Uddingston, built as Christiani-Shand, completed in 1966
- Cardiff to Merthyr Tydfil A470, £5 million first stage from Whitchurch bypass to Nantgarw, 5.23 kilometres (3.25 mi), built as Christiani-Shand, completed in 1971

=== Bridges ===
- The foundations and piers for the Storstrøm Bridge, Denmark, completed in 1937
- The foundations and piers for the Masnedsund Bridge, Denmark, completed in 1937
- Narrows Bridge in Perth, Australia, completed in 1959
- M2 Medway Bridge, Kent, completed in 1963
- Winthorpe Bridge, Nottinghamshire, completed in 1964
- M56 Weaver Viaduct, built as Christiani-Shand, completed in 1971
- The foundations and piers for the Erskine Bridge, (A898), West Dunbartonshire and Renfrewshire, built as Christiani-Shand, completed in 1971
- Dornoch Firth Bridge, completed in 1991
- Salford Quays lift bridge, completed in 2000

=== Other ===
- Monumento Rodoviário da Rodovia Presidente Dutra in Piraí, Brazil completed in 1938
- Democracy Monument in Bangkok, Thailand, completed in 1940
- Aula Magna Auditorium, Caracas, Venezuela completed in 1953
- Rebuilding of the Rama VI Bridge, in Bangkok, Thailand, completed in 1953
- Brixton Tower, Johannesburg, South Africa, completed in 1962
- Kish Bank lighthouse, near Dublin, Ireland, completed in 1965
- Bagsværd Church, Copenhagen, completed in 1976
- Thammasat Stadium in Rangsit, Thailand, completed in 1998
- Prince Mahidol Hall in Phutthamonthon, Thailand, completed in 2014
