= Backford Cross =

Coordinates: 53.258°N 2.92°W

- Suburb
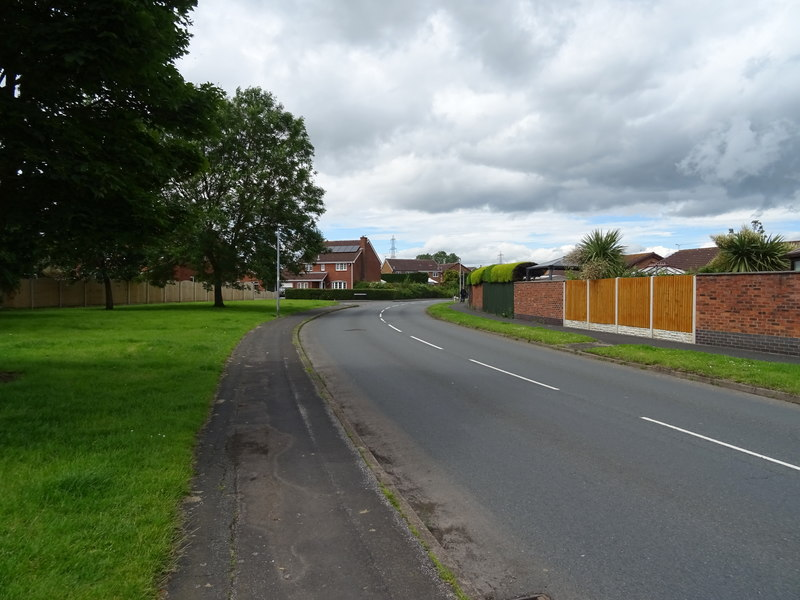
- Willowdale Way

- Location within Cheshire
- OS grid reference: SJ386734
- Unitary authority: Cheshire West and Chester
- Ceremonial county: Cheshire
- Region: North West
- Country: England
- Sovereign state: United Kingdom
- Post town: CHESTER/ELLESMERE PORT
- Postcode district: CH1/CH66
- Dialling code: 0151
- Police: Cheshire
- Fire: Cheshire
- Ambulance: North West
- UK Parliament: Ellesmere Port and Bromborough

Backford Cross is a suburban locality of Ellesmere Port, within the unitary authority of Cheshire West and Chester, Cheshire, England. It is located at the southern end of the Wirral Peninsula around the A41/A5117 road junction. Great Sutton is approximately 3 km (1.9 mi) to the north and the village of Backford, near Chester, is about 2.2 km (1.4 mi) to the south.

The area is split between postcode districts, with parts in both Great Sutton, Ellesmere Port (CH66) and in Backford, Chester (CH1).

Previously farmland, Backford Cross is largely made up of residential homes built from 1990 onwards and serves as a commuter village to Ellesmere Port and Chester. The area covers the residential area around the Willowdale Way/Yeoman Way circle and the property south of Sycamore Park Garden Centre on the A41 Chester Road. Planning permission was granted by Cheshire West and Cheshire Council in 2019 for a housing development to the south west of the A41/A5117 junction. As part of the scheme, the developer was required to financially contribute towards improvements to local amenities and infrastructure.

Capenhurst railway station on the Wirral line of the Merseyrail network is located 2 km (1.2 mi) from Backford Cross.
