= Overpool =

Village in Cheshire, England

Coordinates: 53.292°N 2.922°W

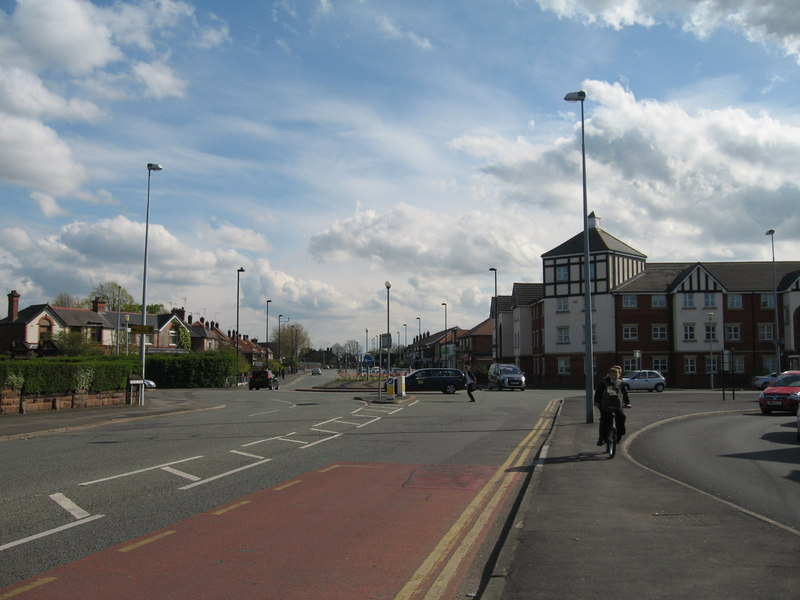
- Rivacre Road in Overpool (2013)

- Location within Cheshire
- OS grid reference: SJ386776
- Unitary authority: Cheshire West and Chester
- Ceremonial county: Cheshire
- Region: North West
- Country: England
- Sovereign state: United Kingdom
- Post town: ELLESMERE PORT
- Postcode district: CH66
- Dialling code: 0151
- Police: Cheshire
- Fire: Cheshire
- Ambulance: North West
- UK Parliament: Ellesmere Port and Bromborough

Overpool is a village on the Wirral Peninsula in Cheshire, England. It is a suburb of Ellesmere Port, and part of the unitary authority of Cheshire West and Chester.

== History ==
The name means "upper pool" and derives from the Old English words uferra and pōl.

Recorded in the Domesday Book under the ownership of William Malbank, the settlement had a population of only two households.

Pool consisted of two townships: Nether Pool and Over Pool, in Eastham parish of the Wirral Hundred. Overpool became a civil parish in 1866 and was part of Wirral Rural District from 1894. The parish was abolished on 1 April 1911 and absorbed into Ellesmere Port. The population was recorded at 89 in 1801, 72 in 1851 and 91 in 1901.

From the 1930s, the settlement of Netherpool was lost to industrial redevelopment and the 16th century Poole Hall was demolished shortly before the outbreak of World War II.

In the 1960s, Overpool's shops on the north side of Rossmore Road West were: GM Birks (Hairdressers), A & JR Leach (Newsagents), a habitually vacant unit, G Partridge (Butchers), Ashe & Nephew (Off-licence), Rivacre Fish Bar (owned by Stan Fairbrother) later to become Harry's Fish Bar (owned by Harry Wong), General Store owned by Mr & Mrs Jones, then later by Mr & Mrs Laider, Betting Office, Rivacre Home Stores owned by a Mr Turner, then Mr & Mrs Walker, and finally a grocer's shop and monumental mason's yard owned by Mr Petrus. Mr & Mrs Steve Cox took this over and the mason's yard was built upon to double the size of the store. On the south side of Rossmore Road West: Overpool Service Station (an Esso filling station), a bakery (later owned by Patisserie Anglaise), Sharples' Newsagents, a Co-op butchers and supermarket, a general store owned by Mr Roberts, a laundrette, a hardware store, a cafe, Galaxie Newsagents, an electrical shop, a chemist owned by Mr Duffy, a Tesco supermarket, and finally the Post Office and Mr Burgess's butchers.

The area underwent considerable change after the Vauxhall Motors factory opened nearby in 1962: several farms that had supplied milk and other dairy produce to the area were replaced by local authority housing. One was "Overpool Dairy" run by Charlie and Norman Dodd, and the other was Jones's farm which was next to the Dodd's place. Dodd's Farm delivered milk by horse and cart up to the early 1960s.

Bowaters Mersey Paper Mill, which produced newsprint from the 1930s, was in nearby Netherpool and had a social club at Overpool that was a popular venue in the 1960s and 1970s.

From 1974 to 2009 it was in Ellesmere Port and Neston district.

== Community ==
St Francis's Church stands at the top of Seymour Drive and there is a Methodist church in nearby Rossmore Road. The original Overpool Methodist Church was on Rivacre Road, a few hundred yards from the Rivacre Baths, on the same side of the road and next to Jones's farm (since demolished). The church was destroyed by fire in the early 1950s, and a new one was built on Rossmore Road (just down from Cemetery Gates, towards Little Sutton), as this was a more prominent place and nearer to the majority of houses.

Housing in Overpool is split between owner occupied and local authority and on the north side of the roundabout is an estate of post-war prefabs built in the 1950s, known locally as 'Tintown'.

Until it closed in 1981 Rivacre Baths, an open-air swimming pool, was a popular attraction in the area. The site of the baths is now occupied by local authority housing that backs on to Rivacre Valley, a local nature reserve and country park.

== Transport ==
Overpool is divided by the A5463 Rossmore Road, which runs between Little Sutton in the west and junction 8 of the M53 motorway in the east.

Overpool railway station opened in 1988, on the branch line that runs to Ellesmere Port from Liverpool Central. Since 1994, the station has been part of the Wirral line of the Merseyrail network. Overpool station is unstaffed and has no ticket office, but ticket machines are available on the platforms.

Route No.	From	To	Via	Frequency	Company	Notes
7	Rivacre	Ellesmere Port	Grace Road	Every 30 mins	Stagecoach	Monday to Saturday
272	Ellesmere Port	Neston	Willaston	Irregular journeys	Helms of Eastham	Monday to Saturday
360	Neston (Raby Park Road)	Overpool (Naylor Road)	Willaston	1 a.m. journey and 1 p.m. journey	Helms of Eastham	School service only
X1	Liverpool	Chester	Ellesmere Port	Every 60 mins	Stagecoach	Monday to Sunday
