= Hapsford =

Village in Cheshire, England

Coordinates: 53.264°N 2.791°W

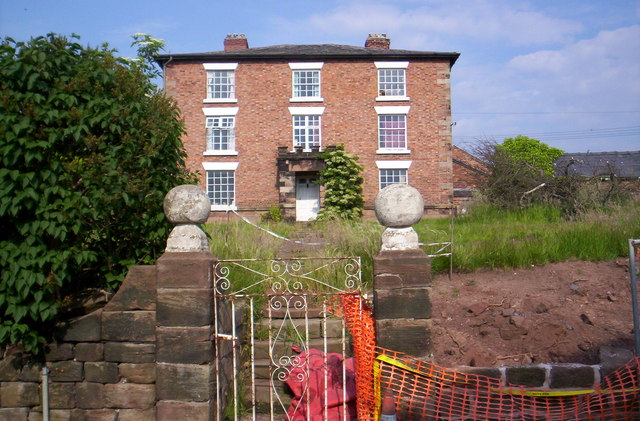
- Hapsford Hall

- Location within Cheshire
- Population: 133 (2011 Census)
- OS grid reference: SJ454740
- Civil parish: Dunham-on-the-Hill and Hapsford
- Unitary authority: Cheshire West and Chester
- Ceremonial county: Cheshire
- Region: North West
- Country: England
- Sovereign state: United Kingdom
- Post town: Frodsham
- Postcode district: WA6
- Dialling code: 01928
- Police: Cheshire
- Fire: Cheshire
- Ambulance: North West
- UK Parliament: Runcorn and Helsby

Hapsford is a village and former civil parish, now in the parish of Dunham-on-the-Hill and Hapsford, in the unitary authority area of Cheshire West and Chester and the ceremonial county of Cheshire, England. It is located on the A5117 road, with Helsby to the east and the village of Elton, near Ellesmere Port, to the north west. Junction 14 of the M56 motorway and Chester services motorway service station are sited nearby.

At the 2001 Census the population of Hapsford civil parish was recorded as 129, increasing slightly to 133 at the 2011 census.

== Governance ==
Hapsford was formerly a township in the parish of Thornton-le-Moors, in 1866 Hapsford became a civil parish, on 1 April 2015 the parish was abolished to form "Dunham-on-the-Hill and Hapsford", part also went to Manley.

== See also ==
- Listed buildings in Hapsford
