= Ince Power Station =

Two demolished power stations in England

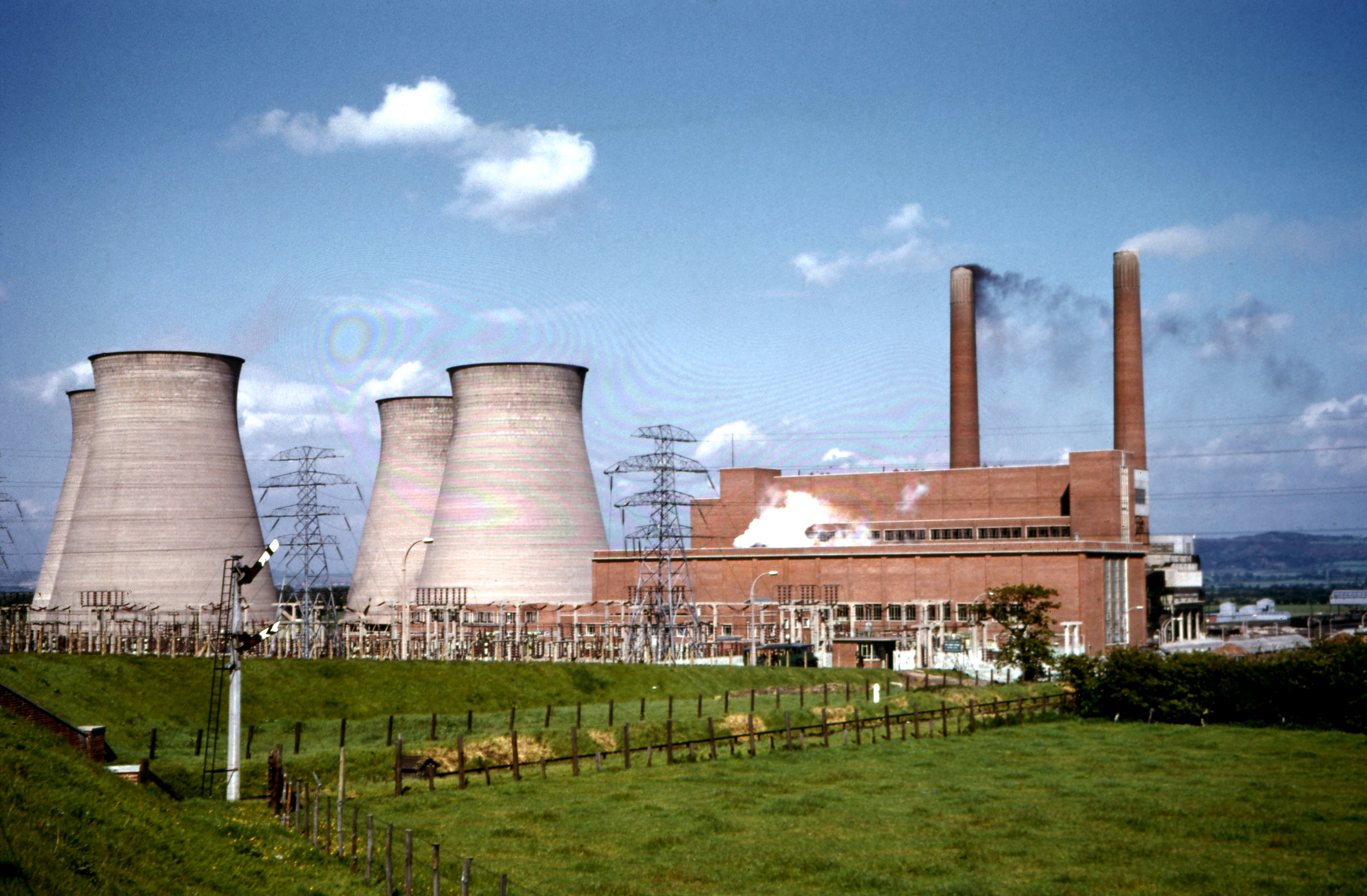
- Ince A power station, 1957
- Country: England
- Location: Cheshire, North West England
- Coordinates: 53.278234°N 2.808304°W
- Commission date: 1957
- Decommission date: 1997
- Operators: Central Electricity Authority (1957); Central Electricity Generating Board (1957–1990); Powergen (1990–1997)

Thermal power station
- Primary fuel: Coal
- Tertiary fuel: Oil-fired

Power generation
- Nameplate capacity: A station: 240 MW B station: 1000 MW

External links
- Commons: Related media on Commons

Ince Power Station refers to two demolished power stations near Ellesmere Port in Cheshire, North West England.

== Ince A ==
When the uranium enrichment plant at Capenhurst opened in 1949, it was realised that its power demand would require the construction of a new power station nearby. Rendel, Palmer & Tritton were appointed as the construction's civil engineering consultants, while the Central Electricity Authority engineered the station's electrical and mechanical plant.

The station was built on an 83-acre (340,000 m^{2}) plot of land acquired as a result of tidal borings. The main buildings were constructed where the load-bearing sandstone was at its highest level. After the removal of 14 ft (4.3 m) of topsoil it was possible to construct the buildings directly upon hard bearing sand, removing the necessity of piled foundations. However, the cooling towers and north chimney did require piled foundations as the sandstone foundation sloped away from the power station site.

The station's main buildings were of steel-framed construction. The boiler house was clad using cellactite sheet cladding, and was of a semi-outdoor construction due to the speed of construction required. The turbine hall was a brick building with prefabricated stone used on window and door surrounds. The building's roof was made from asbestos cement. The floors in the station were made of quarry tile and terrazzo. The station's coal bunkers were steel plate and girder constructions. The entire building measured 350 ft (110 m) long by 232 ft (71 m) wide, containing approximately 3,800 tonnes of steel. The station also had two 300 ft (91 m) chimneys, made from brick with internal diameters of 16 ft (4.9 m). They were supported upon 61 ft (19 m) concrete plinths. The administration and amenity block was built next to the station, and connected to the turbine hall by an overhead access bridge. The block contained the station's control room, along with laboratories, administration offices, a canteen, lockers and showers. It was heated by excess steam bled from the turbines.

Ince A Power Station was opened on 9 October 1957 by Lord Citrine, the chairman of the Central Electricity Authority. The station used four Fraser & Chalmers ( GEC) 60-megawatt (MW) turbo alternators, giving the station a total generation capacity of 240 MW. The first set was commissioned in November 1954 followed by the other sets in March 1955, December 1955, and finally September 1956. Each turbine was supplied with steam from an International Combustion Limited coal-fired boiler at a rate of 550,000 lb (250,000 kg) per hour, and at a temperature of 480 °C. Each boiler and turbine set operated as an independent generating unit, with no interconnection of boilers. It was also realised midway through the station's construction that the station should be capable of dual firing heavy fuel oil. Electricity was generated at 12.8 kilovolts (kV). It was then passed through a transformer which increased the voltage to 132 kV, before passing into the national grid.

The generating capacity, electricity output and thermal efficiency were as shown in the table.

Ince A electricity output
Year	Net capability, MW	Electricity supplied, GWh	Thermal efficiency, %
1956	168	733.21	29.03
1957	224	1158.93	29.02
1958	224	1348.60	29.06
1961	252	1566.752	26.18
1962	252	1672.573	29.50
1963	252	1636.364	29.56
1967	240	1579.217	29.5
1972	240	1182.56	28.31
1979	240	225.76	24.60

Coal was delivered to the station's coal storage area by rail from the East Midlands coalfields.

Water for the station's systems was taken from the River Dee at Chester, and taken to the station by an 8 mile pipeline built by the West Cheshire Water Board to serve the power station and the uranium enrichment plant. The water was cooled using four hyperboloid natural draft cooling towers. Each tower was 250 ft (76 m) tall and had a 205 ft (62 m) base diameter, with a cooling capacity of 2.75 million gallons per hour.

== Ince B ==
Ince B Power Station built as part of the Dash for Oil in the UK during the 1960s, schemed as being a base load operating power station. The choice of the Ince site for a large new oil-fired station was politically influenced as the government wanted a station in the North West of England, which led to a rumour that the power station was built with the only purpose of creating jobs.

The station's construction suffered lengthy delays. Its transmission system was inadequate to handle the large flow of electricity from the nuclear power stations to the north. There were also faults with the station's rotors, which required them returning to the manufacturer's works. The station eventually used two notional spares. Low productivity among construction staff was also a problem, almost leading to the abandonment of the project. The station had eventually begun operating by March 1984, when it achieved the second-highest thermal efficiency in the country for a plant of its size, after Pembroke Power Station in Wales.

The station occupied a 125-acre (0.51 km^{2}) site. Its boiler house measured 102.5 m (336 ft) by 49.5 m (162 ft) and was 61 m (200 ft) tall. The turbine hall was 123 m (404 ft) by 60 m (200 ft) and 32 m (105 ft) tall. There were two boilers rated at 447 kg/s, steam conditions were 158.58 bar at 538 °C with reheat to 538 °C. There were two 500-MW Parsons generators, along with two 25-MW Avon gas turbines. In 1993, one of the station's two units, Unit 5, was converted to burn orimulsion, its boilers being provided by Clarke Chapman Ltd. The station B had a single 152.5 m (500 ft) chimney, with a diameter of 12.5 m (41 ft) which tapered to 7.6 m (25 ft). The station used a single hyperboloid induced draft cooling tower, which stood 116.7 m (383 ft) tall.

Fuel oil was supplied directly to the station by a pipeline, directly from Shell's Stanlow Oil Refinery. Oil was also brought to the station by ship, via a berth on the Manchester Ship Canal.

The station was controlled by two GEC 2050 computers.

The generating capacity, electricity output and thermal efficiency were as shown in the table.

Ince B electricity output
Year	Net capability, MW	Electricity supplied, GWh	Load as percent of capability, %	Thermal efficiency, %
1984	480	157.89	44.0	36.84
1985	480	6,007.14	100.0	38.00
1986	480	90.32	2.2	26.62
1987	480	226.76	5.4	30.49

The intensive use in the year ending 31 March 1985 was associated with the 1984/5 miners strike when the availability of coal for coal-fired power stations was severely limited.

== Closure and demolition ==
The A Station was closed and demolished in the mid-1980s, though its single remaining cooling tower was left standing until 1999. The B Station ceased generating electricity in March 1997 and demolition of the structures commenced a couple of years later. The station's chimney was demolished on 28 April 1999. The station's cooling tower was demolished on 5 December 1999 along with the A Station's remaining cooling tower.
