= M56 motorway =

Motorway in England

M56
- North Cheshire Motorway
- M56 highlighted in blue Shown in North West England Shown with the UK motorway network

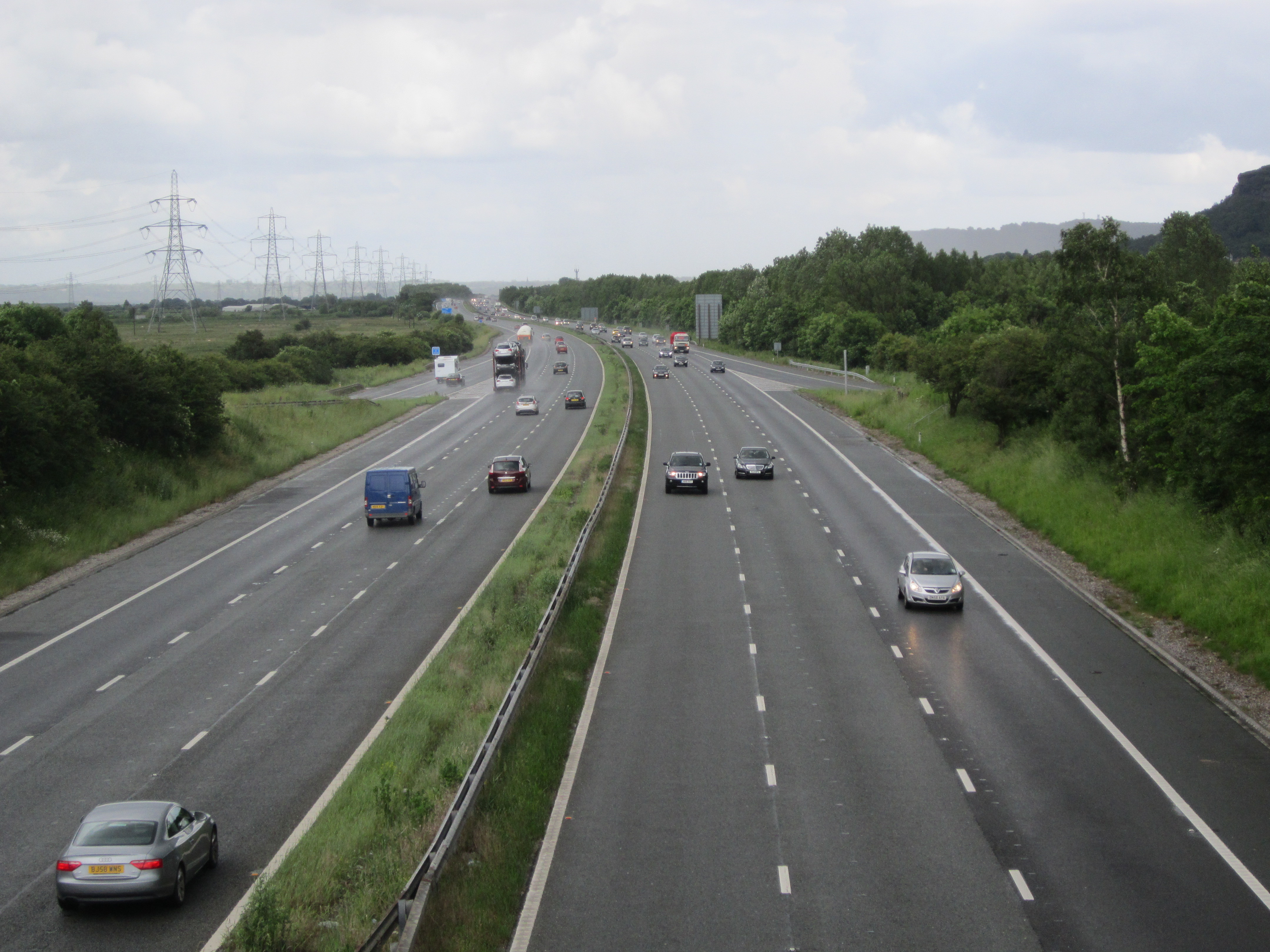
- Looking east from Junction 14, 2012

Route information
- Part of E22
- Maintained by National Highways
- Length: 33.3 mi (53.6 km)
- Existed: 1971–present
- History: Opened: 1971; Completed: 1981

Major junctions
- East end: Gatley
- J1 → M60 motorway; J9 → M6 motorway; J15 → M53 motorway
- West end: Dunkirk

Location
- Country: United Kingdom
- Counties: Greater Manchester, Cheshire
- Primary destinations: Manchester; Manchester Airport; Warrington; Runcorn; Ellesmere Port

Road network
- Roads in the United Kingdom; Motorways; A and B road zones
← M55	→ M57

The M56 motorway serves the Cheshire and Greater Manchester areas of England. It runs east to west from junction 4 of the M60 at Gatley, south of Manchester, to Dunkirk, approximately four miles (six kilometres) north of Chester. With a length of 33.3 miles (53.6 km), it connects North Wales and the Wirral peninsula with much of the rest of North West England, serves business and commuter traffic heading towards Manchester, particularly that from the wider Cheshire area, and provides the main road access to Manchester Airport from the national motorway network.

Between junctions 9 and 16, the motorway forms part of the unsigned European route E22 on its route in the UK between Holyhead in Anglesey and Immingham in Lincolnshire.

== Route ==
Although the main line of the motorway starts as a continuation of the A5103 Princess Parkway, the M56 begins on the Sharston Spur (also known as the Sharston Bypass) where it leaves the M60 motorway at its junction 4 (clockwise exit and anticlockwise entry), adjacent to where the slip roads for the A34 to and from Manchester merge and diverge. After passing through junctions 1 and 2, the spur joins the main line at junction 3, increasing the motorway from two lanes to four in each direction.

The motorway then heads south to the west of Wythenshawe and Manchester Airport until it reaches junction 6, where it turns west before crossing into Cheshire at the River Bollin underbridge. It runs to the south of Hale before reaching junctions 7 and 8 which are part of the same interchange complex. Junction 8 was planned to be used by the proposed A556(M), but is now a single 270-degree loop between the southbound onslip from Bowdon roundabout to the westbound carriageway since the A556 towards the M6 motorway was upgraded to dual carriageway in 2017. Traffic destined for the southbound M6 is directed to leave here (because there are no corresponding slip roads at its own junction) and so the junction can suffer from congestion. Traffic levels on the mainline drop significantly as the motorway begins to assume a more traditional feel (three lanes and a hard shoulder per direction) whilst passing between Broomedge and High Legh.

After meeting the M6 at junction 9, the motorway passes south of Appleton Thorn and Stretton before reaching the outskirts of Runcorn at junction 11, near to where it also crosses over the Bridgewater Canal and the West Coast Main Line. On the other side of the town lies junction 12, whose northern roundabout morphed into a signalised hamburger junction when the Mersey Gateway bridge was built. The concrete multi-span Weaver Viaduct (crossing both the river and its navigation course) immediately follows junction 12 and offers views of the town of Frodsham and its railway viaduct, along with the Ineos chemical plant and Rocksavage Power Station on the opposite side. Between junctions 12 and 14, it runs parallel to the River Mersey, Manchester Ship Canal, a 400 kV overhead power line and the Chester-Warrington railway. After meeting the M53 motorway, the road finally returns to two lanes, it proceeds between Chester to the south and Ellesmere Port to its termination at Dunkirk, Cheshire, where it becomes the A494.

Traffic destined for North Wales can use either the M53 or the A494 to reach the A55.

The motorway is fully lit between the M60 and junction 6 (including all of its spurs) along with the junctions with both the M6 and M53.

There are two motorway service areas on the M56: Chester (operated by Roadchef) and Lymm (operated by Moto, which is also accessible from the M6).

== History ==
The first proposal for a motorway across north Cheshire was mooted in 1947 in a report commissioned by Cheshire County Council, with a line for the route of the motorway being agreed in 1958 between the council and the Ministry of Transport and Civil Aviation. The first section, announced in November 1963 by the transport minister Ernest Marples, was a southwards extension of the Princess Parkway from Wythenshawe in Manchester to the A56 and A556 at Bowdon which entered the Trunk Road Programme for 1967/1968. Construction began in 1968, and the motorway opened in stages between 1971 and 1981:

Proposals existed for an extension into North Wales across the proposed Dee Barrage, but these have never materialised.

The carriageway between junctions 4 and 6 was widened from the original dual three-lane configuration to dual four lanes during the 1990s as part of a nationwide motorway widening programme first proposed in the 1989 Roads to Prosperity white paper. Junction 5 became a lane drop/gain in both directions whereas junction 4 was reconfigured from a two-bridge roundabout to a signalised half-diamond with a single bridge.

Prior to 2008, the western end of the motorway terminated at a roundabout on the A5117. Work began in 2006 to grade-separate this junction (and others) to allow free-flowing traffic between the motorway and the A550 at Deeside in North Wales, meaning that the mainline motorway no longer connects to the roundabout (it meets the extended A494 head-on 235 m (771 ft) east), with the former eastbound carriageway retained as an on-slip.

== Construction ==
=== Wythenshawe to Gatley ===
Junctions 1 to 3. The route was fixed in April 1970. The contract for the western section was given in February 1973 to Peter Lind & Company for £1,245,700. The eastern section contract, for around £5 million, was given to Leonard Fairclough & Son in December 1971. The western section opened in May 1975, and the eastern section opened in March 1974.

=== Bowdon to Wythenshawe ===
Junctions 3a to 7, 7 miles (11 km). The route was fixed in early April 1968, to start at the end of 1968. The contract was given at the end of July 1969, for £6,727,920 to Holland, Hannen & Cubitts. It opened in January 1972. The tensioned central reservation barrier was made by Hill & Smith of Brierley Hill, then in Staffordshire.

=== Preston Brook to Bowdon ===
Junctions 7 to 11, 11 miles (18 km). The draft route was announced December 1969 by Fred Mulley. The inquiry was at Stockton Heath in July 1970. The route was fixed in September 1971 by Peter Walker, Baron Walker of Worcester. In October 1972, contracts were given by Graham Page for £6.3 million to Marples Ridgway for Preston Brook to Lymm, and to Robert McGregor & Sons for 5.2 miles (8.4 km) from Lymm to Bowdon for £4.65 million. The Croft Interchange (junction 9), with the M6, took up 180 acres (73 ha) of land. Bowdon to Lymm (7 to 9) opened in December 1974. Preston Brook to Lymm (9 to 11) was opened in July 1975 by Gordon Oakes; the section should have opened in the autumn of 1974, but was held up by bad weather.

=== Hapsford to Preston Brook ===
Junctions 11 to 14, 8 miles (13 km). The 200-foot (61 m) bridge over the Chester–Warrington line, at Clifton, was built with PTFE joints and rolled into place in October 1968, known as incremental launch; it was built by Leonard Fairclough & Son, and designed by Husband & Company. The contract for the Hapsford to Preston Brook section was given on in November 1968, for £6.07 million to Christiani-Shand, for 8 miles to take 24 months, and to be finished by December 1970, with main work started in December 1968. Hapsford to Sutton Weaver (12 to 14) opened in February 1971 at 11 am. The A557 to Preston Brook (11 to 12), 3 miles (4.8 km), opened in September 1971.

=== Lea-by-Backford to Hapsford ===
Junctions 14 to 16. Plans were extended eastwards 6 miles (9.7 km) to Lea-by-Backford. It had originally been planned as a trunk road corridor, that was belatedly upgraded to be built as a motorway, and the western section had only two lanes, much like a trunk road. The first two were contracts awarded in February 1978. The last contract of the M56 from Stoak to Lea-by-Backford was awarded in September 1978. The contract for the southerly M531 to Hoole had not yet been given.

The last section was started October 1978 by Alfred McAlpine. Percy Bilton Ltd of Stone, Staffordshire, built the Stoak Interchange itself. The M56 section opened in March 1981. The section from Stoak to Lea-by-Backford was two-lane only. The one-mile section of the two-lane M531 from the A5117 south to the M56 Stoak Interchange, was also opened on 18 March 1981, being built by Leonard Fairclough & Son. The M531 would become the M53, when it fully opened in 1982. This £18 million section was three months late, as construction of the Stoak Interchange had caused the hold up. Hapsford to east of Stoak cost £5.42 million; the Stoak Interchange cost £4.84 million; Stoak to Lea-by-Backford cost £4.32 million. The M531 from Little Stanney to Stoak cost £3.46 million. The final section of the M531 was to open in 1982, from south of Stoak to the A56 near Chester, built by Monk. The M531 was originally planned to be extended to cross the Chester bypass, and terminate on the A41 at Upton-by-Chester, west of Hoole. The M531 extension was planned to open mid-July 1982; the remaining 2.5 miles (4.0 km) M531 section opened in July 1982, costing £14 million.

This contains the only section of the motorway paved with concrete, between junctions 15 and 16. Where it crosses the floodplain of the River Gowy, the carriageway sits on an embankment made of sandstone from a special-purpose quarry, which was constructed to replace existing peat deposits. The junction with the M53 at Stoak was also included in the construction contracts. The M53 Mid Wirral Motorway was mostly built in 1971; it was originally planned to terminate on the A41 at Great Sutton, with a continuation of the Chester bypass to cross an east-west trunk dual carriageway, east of the present western terminus of the M56.

== Junctions ==
M56 motorway junctions
Ceremonial county	Location	mi	km	Junction	Destinations	Notes
Greater Manchester	Wythenshawe	0	0	1 (Note: 53.3985°N 2.2344°W)	M60 – Stockport, Sheffield, Leeds A34 – Manchester city centre, Didsbury	Exits to M60 Eastbound and A34 Northbound only Entrance from M60 Westbound and A34 southbound only
Greater Manchester	Wythenshawe	1.2	1.9	2 (Note: 53.3965°N 2.2572°W)	A560 – Wythenshawe, Cheadle, Wilmslow, Altrincham, Baguley	No Eastbound exit or Westbound entrance
Greater Manchester	Wythenshawe	1.9	3.1	3 (Note: 53.3937°N 2.2706°W)	M56 – Stockport, Didsbury, Sheffield, Leeds	No Northbound entrance or Southbound exit Small spur going to junction 3a
Greater Manchester	Wythenshawe	—		3a (Note: 53.3993°N 2.2706°W)	A560 – Altrincham, Wythenshawe, Cheadle A5103 – Manchester city centre, Liverpool, Bolton	
Greater Manchester	Wythenshawe	2.8	4.5	4 (Note: 53.3816°N 2.2781°W)	Sharston, Newall Green	No Southbound entrance or Northbound exit
Greater Manchester	Hale Barns	3.4	5.4	5 (Note: 53.3748°N 2.2872°W)	A555 – Manchester Airport	
Greater Manchester	Hale Barns	4.3	6.9	6 (Note: 53.3628°N 2.2961°W)	A538 – Wilmslow, Hale, Macclesfield	
Cheshire	Bowdon	7.9	12.8	7 (Note: 53.3627°N 2.3856°W)	A56 – Lymm, Altrincham A556 – Northwich, M6 – Birmingham	
Cheshire	Warrington	13.2	21.2	9 (Note: 53.3525°N 2.5029°W)	M6 – Birmingham, Preston, Leeds, Manchester A50 – Warrington, Appleton, Knutsford	
Cheshire	Warrington	16.3	26.2	10 (Note: 53.3346°N 2.5712°W)	A49 – Whitchurch, Warrington A559 – Northwich	
Cheshire	Runcorn	19.3	31.1	11 (Note: 53.3270°N 2.6432°W)	A56 – Northwich, Warrington	
Cheshire	Runcorn	22.3	35.8	12 (Note: 53.3110°N 2.7050°W)	A557 – Frodsham, Runcorn	
Cheshire	Ellesmere Port	27.4	44.2	14 (Note: 53.2663°N 2.8036°W)	A5117 – Helsby, Frodsham, Stanlow	
Cheshire	Ellesmere Port	30.6	49.3	15 (Note: 53.2502°N 2.8687°W)	M53 – Chester, Wrexham, Ellesmere Port, Birkenhead	No Eastbound exits or Westbound entrances
Cheshire	Ellesmere Port	34.0	54.8	16 (Note: 53.2427°N 2.9432°W)	A494 – Queensferry A540 – Chester A5117 – Ellesmere Port	
1.000 mi = 1.609 km; 1.000 km = 0.621 mi: Incomplete access

Coordinate list

M56 motorway junctions
mile	km	Eastbound exits (B Carriageway)	Junction	Westbound exits (A Carriageway)
		Motorway merges onto M60 continuing towards Stockport	M60 J4	Start of motorway (Sharston Spur)
		Manchester City Centre, Didsbury A34	J1	No access (on-slip only)
		No access (on-slip only)	J2	Altrincham, Wythenshawe A560, Liverpool (M62), Bolton (M61) (M60)
		Manchester City Centre, (M60(N&W)), (M62(W)), (M61) (A5103)	J3 (TOTSO EB)	No access (on-slip only)
7.2	11.6	No access (on-slip only)	J4	Wythenshawe
7.8	12.6	Manchester	J5	Manchester, Quarry Bank Mill
8.9	14.3	Hale, Wilmslow, Macclesfield A538	J6	Wilmslow, Hale, Macclesfield, Manchester Airport Freight Terminal A538
		Entering Greater Manchester		River Bollin
		River Bollin		Entering Cheshire
12.4	19.9	Northwich A556, Altrincham A56	J7	Birmingham (M6(S)), Northwich A556, Lymm A56
		No access	J8	No access (on-slip only)
17.6	28.3	Preston, Birmingham M6, Leeds, Manchester (N) (M62), Lymm (A50); Lymm Truck Stop	J9; Services	Preston M6, Liverpool (M62), Warrington, Lymm (A50); Lymm Truck Stop
20.8	33.4	Warrington, Northwich A49	J10	Northwich, Warrington A49
23.8	38.3	Runcorn (East), Warrington A56	J11	Preston Brook, Daresbury A56
26.8	43.1	Liverpool, Runcorn, Widnes A557	J12	Liverpool, Frodsham, Runcorn, Widnes A557
		Weaver Viaduct		
31.9	51.4	Stanlow, Helsby A5117; Chester services	J14; Services	Helsby, Stanlow, Chester Zoo A5117; Chester services
34.5	55.6	No access (on-slip only)	J15	Chester, Wrexham M53
		No access (on-slip only)	J15	Ellesmere Port, Birkenhead M53
		Start of motorway	J16	No access
		Ellesmere Port A5117, Whitchurch (A41); Non-motorway traffic	J16	End of motorway Road continues as A494 towards North Wales
Princess Parkway Spur
		End of motorway Road continues as A5103 towards Manchester	J3A	Sharston, Altrincham, Baguley A560
		Altrincham, Wythenshawe, Wythenshawe, Cheadle A560	J3A	Start of motorway (Princess Parkway Spur)
Airport Spur
		End of motorway Wilmslow, Wythenshawe A555 (B5166), Business Park, Terminal 3 Terminal 1,		Start of motorway (Airport Spur)
		Terminal 2		No access (on-slip only)
1.000 mi = 1.609 km; 1.000 km = 0.621 mi: Incomplete access

Data from driver location signs is used to provide distance information.

=== Junction 7 slip closures ===
At junction 7 in July 2009, the slip road letting traffic come in southbound along the M56 and turn onto the A556 southbound was closed while the bridge where it crosses the M56 (the Bowdon View Bridge), which for many years had had a weight restriction, was worked on; traffic intending to use it had to carry on to junction 10 and turn round there, or go through the centre of Altrincham; traffic for the nearby Tatton Park Flower Show, and the resulting closure to through traffic of the minor road along the southwest edge of Tatton Park from Ashley, Cheshire to Mere, Cheshire (which would otherwise have acted as a bypass for people living in the area), added to the resulting congestion.

In October and November 2010, the bridge was demolished and replaced.

=== Thorley Lane bridge replacement ===
On Saturday 28 February and Sunday 1 March 2015, the new concrete girders of the Thorley Lane bridge a little north of Manchester Airport were put in. (The old bridge was demolished because it was found to be cracking.) The M56 was closed over that weekend for this. This caused much traffic congestion from M56 traffic diverted through Altrincham and Wythenshawe and along Styal Road and Kingsway, starting on Thursday 26 March because of work putting cones on the carriageway.

== Traffic counts ==
Section	Capacity	AADT (2019)		Count point data
J1-J2	D2	96,643	▼	6046, 73773
J2-J3	D2	72,019	▲	36045
J3-J3A (Princess Parkway Spur)	D3	102,674	▲	99833
J3-J4	D4	174,693	▲	26047
J4-J5	D4	150,675	▼	6047
Airport Spur	D2	67,863	▲	89289
J5-J6	D4	138,257	▲	16044
J6-J7	D3	118,528	▲	46044
J7-J8	D3	82,528	▲	8025
J8-J9	D3	87,582	▲	6048
J9-J10	D3	117,996	▼	56047, 73275
J10-J11	D3	107,049	▼	16045, 73448
J11-J12	D3	100,488	▼	46045
J12-J14	D3	113,408	▼	26049, 73282
J14-J15	D3	120,523	▲	7831
J15-J16	D2	44,042	▲	37919

== Upgrades ==
=== Junction J6 to J8 Smart Motorway ===
The government announced in August 2015 that the motorway between junctions 6 and 8 would be upgraded to a smart motorway as part of its Northern Powerhouse strategy; work began in 2020 and was completed in early 2023, originally anticipated for late 2021. The project will with the exception of the slip roads at the airport junction give the motorway four running lanes on each carriageway between junctions 6 and 8, with an already existing standard motorway with 4 lanes from junction 6 to junction 3. As the work on the lanes is finished, the temporary speed limit was increased to 60mph in March 2023, with all lanes open. The 70mph national speed limit was to be reapplied when National Highways systems finished final commissioning work.

=== Junction 11a ===
There was also to be a new junction 11a at Runcorn between the existing junctions 11 and 12 to relieve heavy congestion on this stretch and serve the new Mersey Gateway bridge. However, this project was cancelled by Highways England in Spring 2020 as it didn't represent value for money.

== M56 corridor ==
"The M56 corridor" is a term used by estate agents and social geographers to describe what is considered to be a relatively affluent area of North West England, within easy reach of the M56. The area includes the cities of Manchester and Chester, and commuter towns and villages in rural Cheshire. It also includes Warrington and Runcorn, where the chemical and pharmaceutical industries are prominent.

== See also ==
- List of motorways in the United Kingdom
- Chester to Manchester Line
