= A494 road =

Road in Great Britain

A494

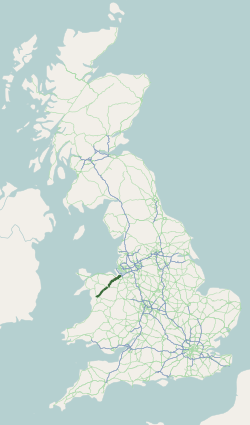

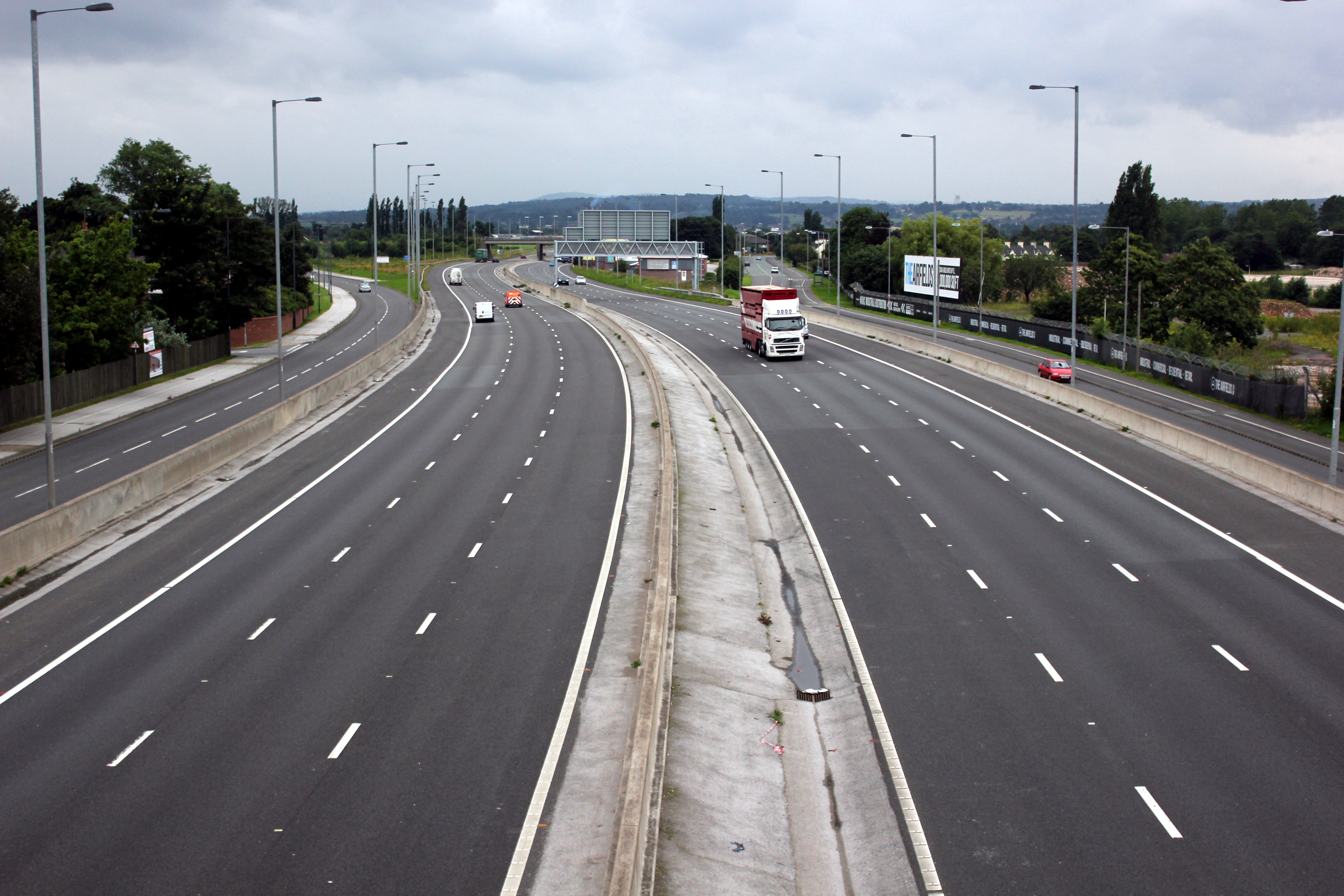
- Looking south towards Queensferry, Flintshire

Route information
- Part of E22
- Maintained by National Highways; North and Mid Wales Trunk Road Agent
- Length: 61.9 mi (99.6 km)

Major junctions
- Northeast end: Mollington; 53.2440°N 2.9298°W
- M56 A5117 A540 A550 A548; A55 A5119 A541 A549 A525 A5104; A5 A4212 A470
- Southwest end: Dolgellau; 52.7454°N 3.8761°W

Location
- Country: United Kingdom
- Counties: Cheshire, Flintshire, Denbighshire, Gwynedd
- Primary destinations: Queensferry; Mold; Ruthin; Bala; Dolgellau

Road network
- Roads in the United Kingdom; Motorways; A and B road zones
← A493	→ A495

The A494 is a trunk road in Wales and England. The route, which is officially known as the Dolgellau to South of Birkenhead Trunk Road, runs between the terminus of the M56 motorway between Mollington and Capenhurst and the A470 at Dolgellau, Gwynedd. Its northern sections remain among the busiest roads in Wales.

== History ==
In the 1920s the A494 ran from Dolgellau to Queensferry.

A dual carriageway bypass of the what had been the A548 through Queensferry opened in 1962, and was numbered as A494. This incorporated a fixed-arched bridge, in contrast to the two moveable bridges then downstream of it. (Note: Blue Bridge (Queensferry) and Hawarden Bridge) This was permitted as the closure of the sea-going wharfs at Saltney had led to a reduction in larger river traffic.

Parts of the road were diverted over the following years, including the Mold, Ruthin and Drws y Nant sections, and it was truncated at the Dolgellau end when the town was bypassed. In 2009 the A494 was extended to reach the M56, following improvements to what had been sections of the A550 and A5117.

== Route ==
=== Queensferry to Ewloe ===
This section forms part of the North Wales coast route between Holyhead and the M56 motorway. The section of the A494 north of the River Dee was upgraded to four lanes plus hard shoulders in each direction in 2004 as part of a wider scheme, which upgraded the A550 as well, although not all of the lanes on the A494 have been opened.

The next stage of the scheme was to widen a 2.5-mile (4.0 km) stretch of the A494 from the River Dee up Aston Hill to the Ewloe Interchange, the junction of the A55 and A494, to three and four-lane plus hard shoulder standard.

In April 2006, local residents living at Aston Hill, part of the proposed route, began a campaign to oppose any further widening of the A494. After 15 months, protesters' high-profile message had garnered more than 2,300 individual letters and numerous petitions rejecting the proposals._{{{}_{Citation needed}}} A planning inquiry was held in September and October 2007.

In March 2008 the proposals (in entirety) were ordered to be scrapped by Ieuan Wyn Jones, Deputy First Minister, responsible for Transport at the Welsh Assembly.

In reaching my decision I have taken account of the concerns raised by the inspector that the overall size of the scheme would have a significant impact on the landscape and would affect walking and cycling routes. I have also noted [the planning inspector's] remarks that while he considers that this section of the A494 will need some form of improvement in the foreseeable future, he considers that the scale of the scheme as originally proposed is greater than required.

——Deputy First Minister Ieuan Wyn Jones

This part of the A494 will remain a two-lane dual carriageway and the speed limit will be 50 mph (80 km/h). The decision has left a question mark over the future of the remaining upgrade at Ewloe Interchange.

Resentment also remains within the Aston Hill community as thirty households were evicted from their homes earlier in the scheme. These houses were earmarked to be demolished to make way for the road-widening works.

An upgrade "blue route" was again one of two options first published in 2015 to alleviate congestion in the Deeside corridor. The alternative route "red route" was eventually chosen which will route round the Deeside Industrial Estate and over the River Dee Bridge.

=== Ewloe to Corwen ===
Just past Ewloe interchange the A55 converges with the A494. At this point the dual carriageway becomes the A55 and the A494 diverges onto a single-carriageway trunk road. This section is approximately 25 miles (40 km) in length. It is largely national speed limit with exceptions through urbanised areas.

The A494, which follows a largely unchanged historic route, passes Mold through the Clwydian Mountains, down to Ruthin and on to the market town of Corwen. Although it follows the traditional coach route, work has been undertaken over many decades to improve various sections of this road. For instance a bypass was completed in 1999 to allow traffic to avoid Mold's town centre. Likewise a dangerous road junction for Moel Famau, just outside Loggerheads, that was on a bend and blind brow has now been completely bypassed.

The A494 enters Ruthin by traversing the steep side of the Vale of Clwyd. Beyond the town, it heads south through several small villages. Beside the road for much of the way is the disused Ruthin to Corwen Railway line. The A494, up to this point, often remains congestion-free as a lot of traffic follows the parallel shorter A5104 between the A55 and Corwen around Llantysilio Mountain.

The A494 meets the A5 trunk road at a T-junction just outside Corwen. It now makes a short 1.5 miles (2.4 km) concurrency with the A5 to Druid.

=== Druid to Dolgellau ===
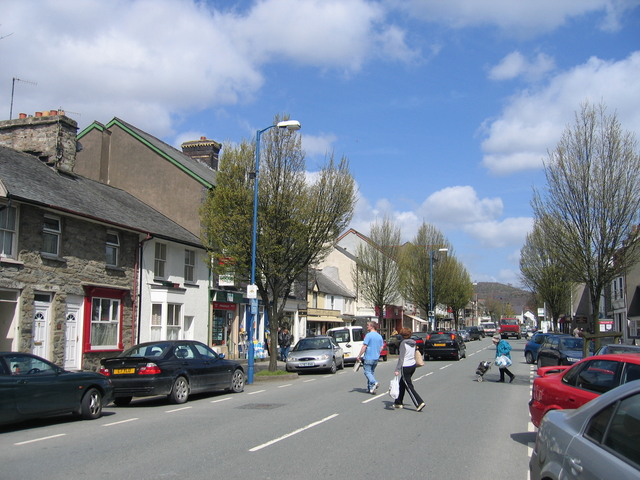
The A494 through the centre of Bala, Gwynedd.

The A494 diverges from the concurrency with the A5 at the road junction at Druid, Denbighshire. It then heads south west for 27 miles (43 km) to Dolgellau, Gwynedd.

This section of the A494 remains single carriageway. It has variable speed limits. North Wales Police regularly conduct traffic operations on this road.

The A494 enters the Snowdonia National Park just outside the market town of Bala. It then runs adjacent to Llyn Tegid (Bala Lake) for 4 miles (6.4 km) and past Aran Fawddwy.

Beyond the south west end of the lake, at the summit of the pass at Pant Gwyn, the A494 enters a long steeply graded valley that follows the River Wnion (Welsh: Afon Wnion) to Dolgellau. Again a former railway also runs parallel with the road. The remains of the line can be seen in places.

The A494 terminates at a T-junction with the A470 just outside the market town of Dolgellau beneath Cadair Idris.

== See also ==
- Trunk roads in Wales

== Sources ==
- Motorways UK
- Highways Agency
- Aston Hill Project
