= Ellesmere Port Dock =

Dock in Ellesmere Port, Cheshire, England

Coordinates: 53°17′20″N 2°53′36″W

Ellesmere Port Dock is a dock in Britain, situated on the Manchester Ship Canal, in Ellesmere Port, Cheshire, England.

== History ==
Ellesmere Canal is the name of the area were the canal joins the river Mersey; by the mid-1790s it was known as Ellesmere Port. Docks and warehouses were built to facilitate this.

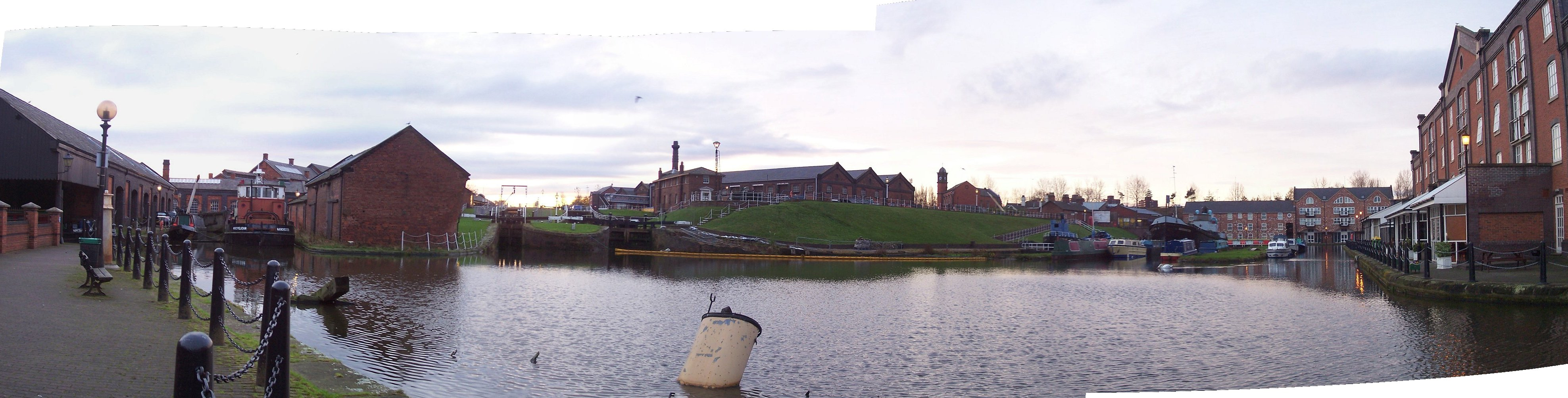

Between 1830 and the 1840s facilities were improved by the engineer Thomas Telford and others. In 1846 the Ellesmere Canal was amalgamated with the Shropshire Union Canal.

In 1892 a new wharf was built to handle traffic on the Manchester Ship Canal.

In 1921 the docks were leased to the Manchester Ship Canal, and this led to the decline of Ellesmere Port.

== 20th century ==
The site is now the National Waterways Museum, Ellesmere Port (formerly known as the Boat Museum).

== 21st century ==
In 2007, as part of a revival of some industries, ports and shipbuilding in Britain, Ellesmere Port docks were re-opened. In 2008 the site of Ellesmere Port's operational dock - including over 70 acres (280,000 m^{2}) of the waterfront area (immediately to the north-west of Ellesmere Port Historic Dock and Conservation Area and to the south-east of the Bridgewater Paper Works) - was the subject of a planning consultation, in which it may have been proposed that the docks be relocated closer to Eastham on the Cheshire West and Chester/Wirral boundary, and the area be redeveloped into a predominantly residential area consisting of up to 8,000 new homes. Plans for such development were expected to be submitted to the Local Authority during early 2009.

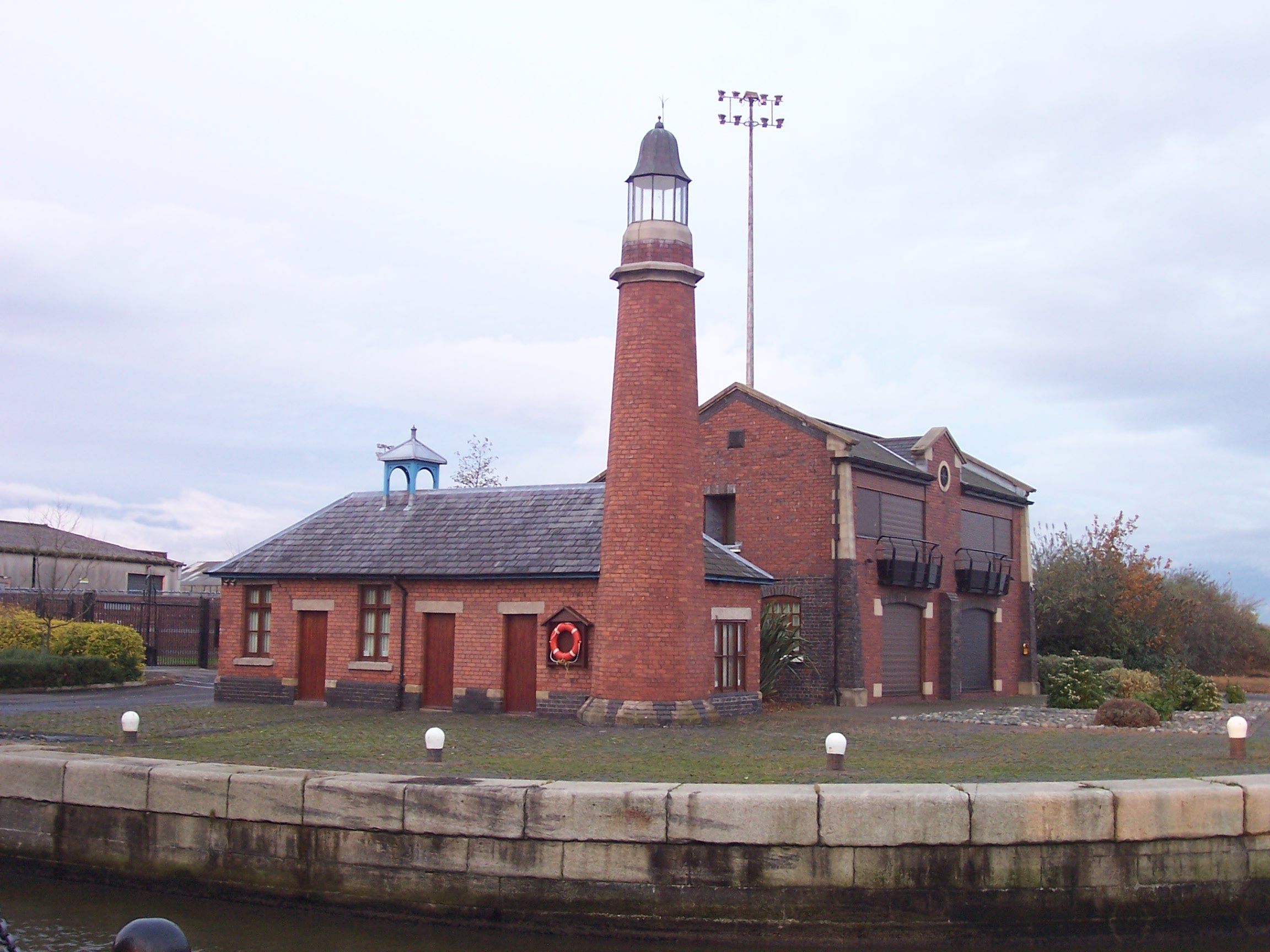
Whitby lighthouse

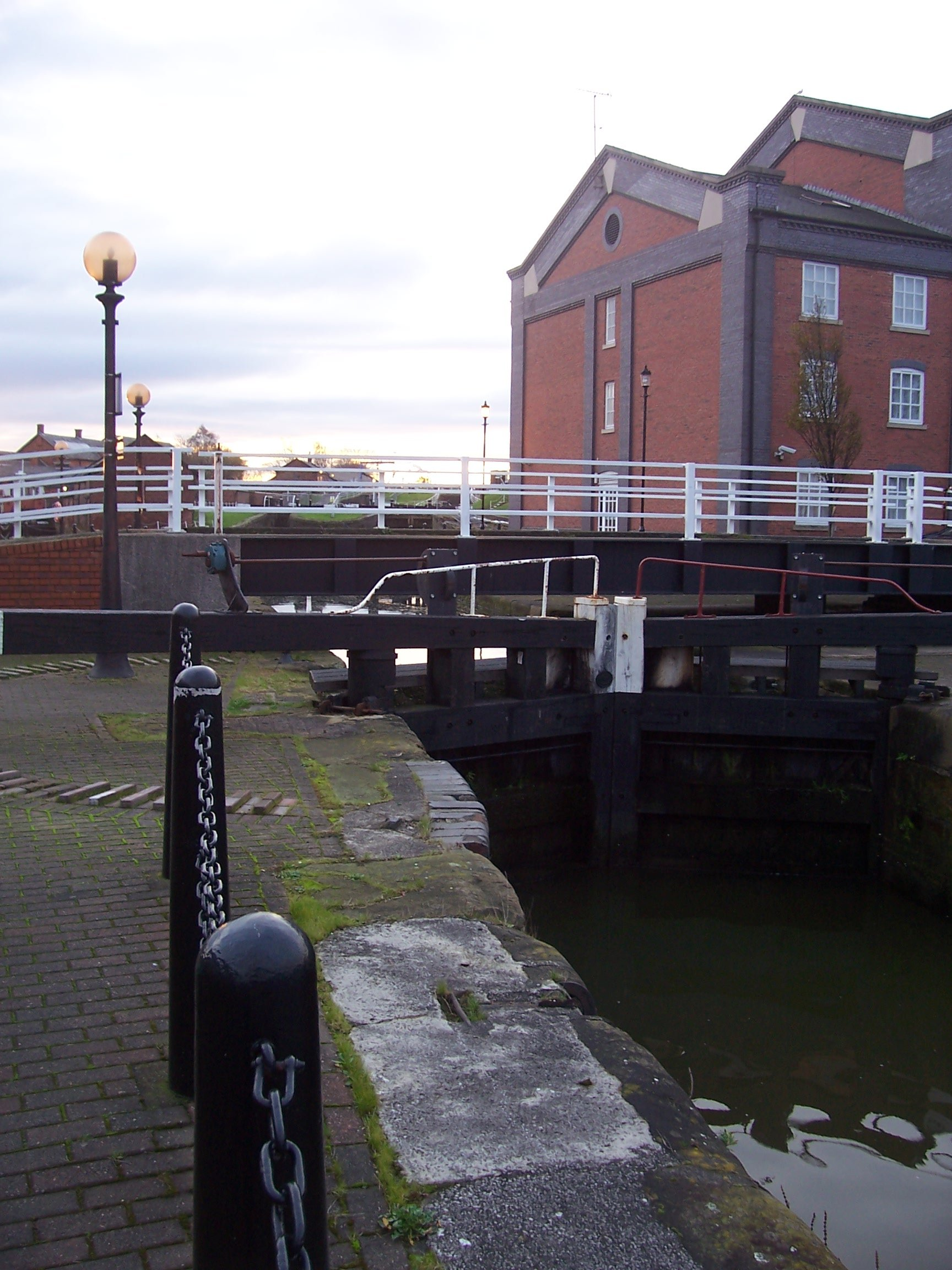
lower lock and bridge
