= Ince Park =

Ince Park is a resource recovery facility being developed by Peel Group near Ince, Cheshire.

== Information ==
Ince Park will be the largest such facility in the UK, and is dedicated to waste management and environmental technologies, taking waste and transforming it into energy. It will occupy a 126-acre (51 ha) site with road and rail access on the south bank of the Manchester Ship Canal, from which it can accommodate ships. It is being developed by a joint venture partnership by Peel Environmental and Covanta Energy. This park will possibly generate over 110 megawatts of renewable and low-cost energy. The main concept of Ince Park is to perceive waste as a green and sustainable resource for energy rather than a costly problem to be dealt with. It will also provide careers in the areas of waste, manufacturing, engineering, power generation, warehousing, supply chain, and logistics. Ince Park has received planning approval and will be the centre of an Eco Park. It has been projected to provide capacity for about 16 percent of the North West's renewable energy.
