= Helsby =

Village in Cheshire, England

Coordinates: 53.273°N 2.770°W

- Village and civil parish
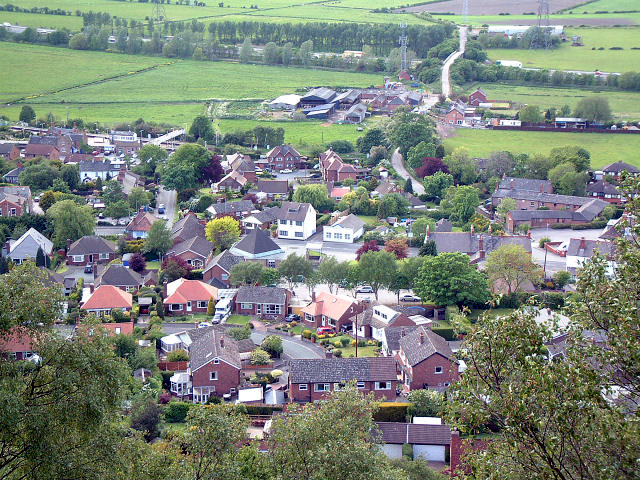
- Helsby from Helsby Hill

- Location within Cheshire
- Population: 4,972 (2011 census)
- OS grid reference: SJ491755
- Civil parish: Helsby
- Unitary authority: Cheshire West and Chester
- Ceremonial county: Cheshire
- Region: North West
- Country: England
- Sovereign state: United Kingdom
- Post town: FRODSHAM
- Postcode district: WA6
- Dialling code: 01928
- Police: Cheshire
- Fire: Cheshire
- Ambulance: North West
- UK Parliament: Runcorn and Helsby

Helsby is a village, civil parish and electoral ward in the unitary authority of Cheshire West and Chester and the ceremonial county of Cheshire, England. Overlooking the Mersey estuary, it is approximately 9 miles (14 km) north east of Chester and 2.5 miles (4 km) south west of Frodsham.

In the 2001 census the civil parish of Helsby had a population of 4,701. By the 2011 census this had risen to 4,972.

== Geography ==
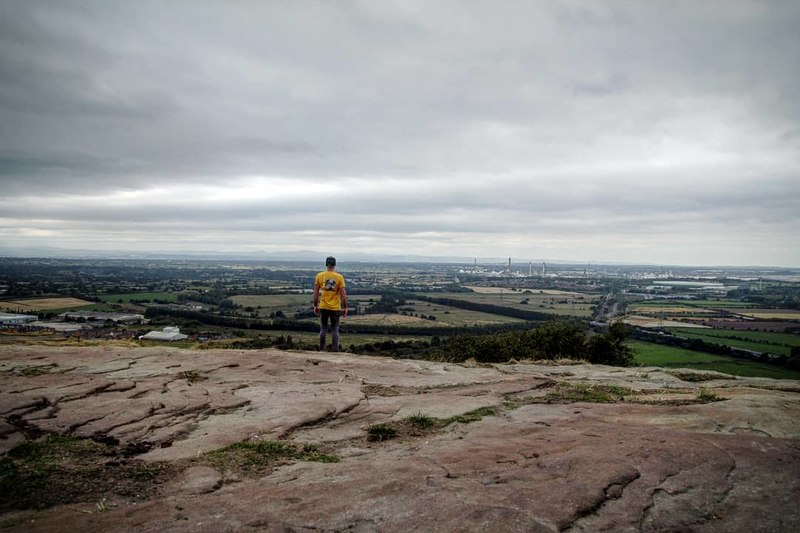
Outlook from atop Helsby Hill

The village is situated on the A56 main road between Chester and Runcorn. The neighbouring settlements are Dunham-on-the-Hill, Frodsham, Elton and Alvanley. Helsby is a semi-rural village, with a few dairy and arable farms, but is also in close proximity to a number of industrial plants around the Mersey estuary including the Essar Stanlow Oil Refinery, the Encirc glass bottle manufacturing plant, the Kemira fertiliser plant on Ince Marshes and the Ineos Chlor chemical manufacturing site and power station at Rocksavage. There are few jobs in Helsby itself. The Tesco supermarket is one of the biggest employers in Helsby. The village is popular with commuters as a residential area, due to its links to the M56 motorway and rail networks.

== History ==
On Helsby Hill, the remains of a promontory hillfort, 1.9ha in area, have been excavated. A buried soil was found under the hillfort containing fossilised pollen dating to the late Mesolithic to early Neolithic, between 7000 and 3001 BC. Further evidence suggests a burning episode dating to the early Neolithic occupation or woodland clearance dating to 4000BC to 2351 BC.

The bivallate hillfort is protected on the south and east by two parallel ramparts and an unusual type of inturned entrance 11 yards (10 m) wide. There were three phases of hillfort construction at Helsby. The first stone rampart was constructed in the middle to late Bronze Age (1250–1050 cal BC) and consisted of a bank with a well-dressed outer face of sandstone blocks and an irregular inner face, which was built on a slight batter; it was approximately 4 yards (3.5m) wide. A socketed bronze axe was found at Helsby in 1925. This was followed by a series of colluvial deposits against the internal face of the stone rampart that formed the second phase of activity. The third and final phase was the re-building of the rampart in the post-Roman period, dating as late as 530 AD suggesting early Saxon re-occupation of the hillfort.

Helsby was located on the strategically important Roman road between Chester and Wilderspool near Warrington. The road existed between c. 79–410 AD to link the garrison of Deva to Wilderspool, which produced pottery that supplied the north west of England. The Roman road passed at the foot of Helsby Hill probably following the route of Old Chester Road. On the top of the hill a Roman bronze sestertius of the emperor Tiberius minted in Rome in AD22 was found and just off Vicarage Lane in 1958, an uninscribed Roman altar of red sandstone was discovered with a carved jug on one side and an axe and knife on the other.

The first known settlers of Helsby were the Vikings in the 10th century. In fact, the name 'Helsby' is likely to be derived from the Viking name Hjallr-by, meaning "the village on the edge" (placenames with the suffix "by" often denote Viking/Danish origins, e.g. Derby, Grimsby, Whitby, etc.). However, Old Norse suggests that Hjalli means edge and Hjallr means constructed platform or scaffold.

The village was recorded in the Domesday Book of 1086 under the Norman name of Hellesbe. The Manor of Helsby was owned by a series of aristocratic landowners, most recently the Marquess of Cholmondeley.

In the 13th century Helsby was deemed a demesne manor under the lordship of Dunham-on-the-Hill, by a family called Hellesby. Later it passed to Thornton and then to Frodsham. The earliest mention of the original, timber Old Hall, was in a contract for the construction of additional work in stone in the mid 15th century. The wooden part of the hall perished in a fire in the 16th century when it was leased to one of the Hatons of Helsby. The later hall probably derived its name from its proximity to the older site. It was built of brick at the end of the 18th century and was used as a farmhouse.

Helsby Hill was the location of a rare public execution when William Henry Clarke was hung in chains on 21 April 1791 after being convicted of robbing the Warrington Mail.

== Community ==
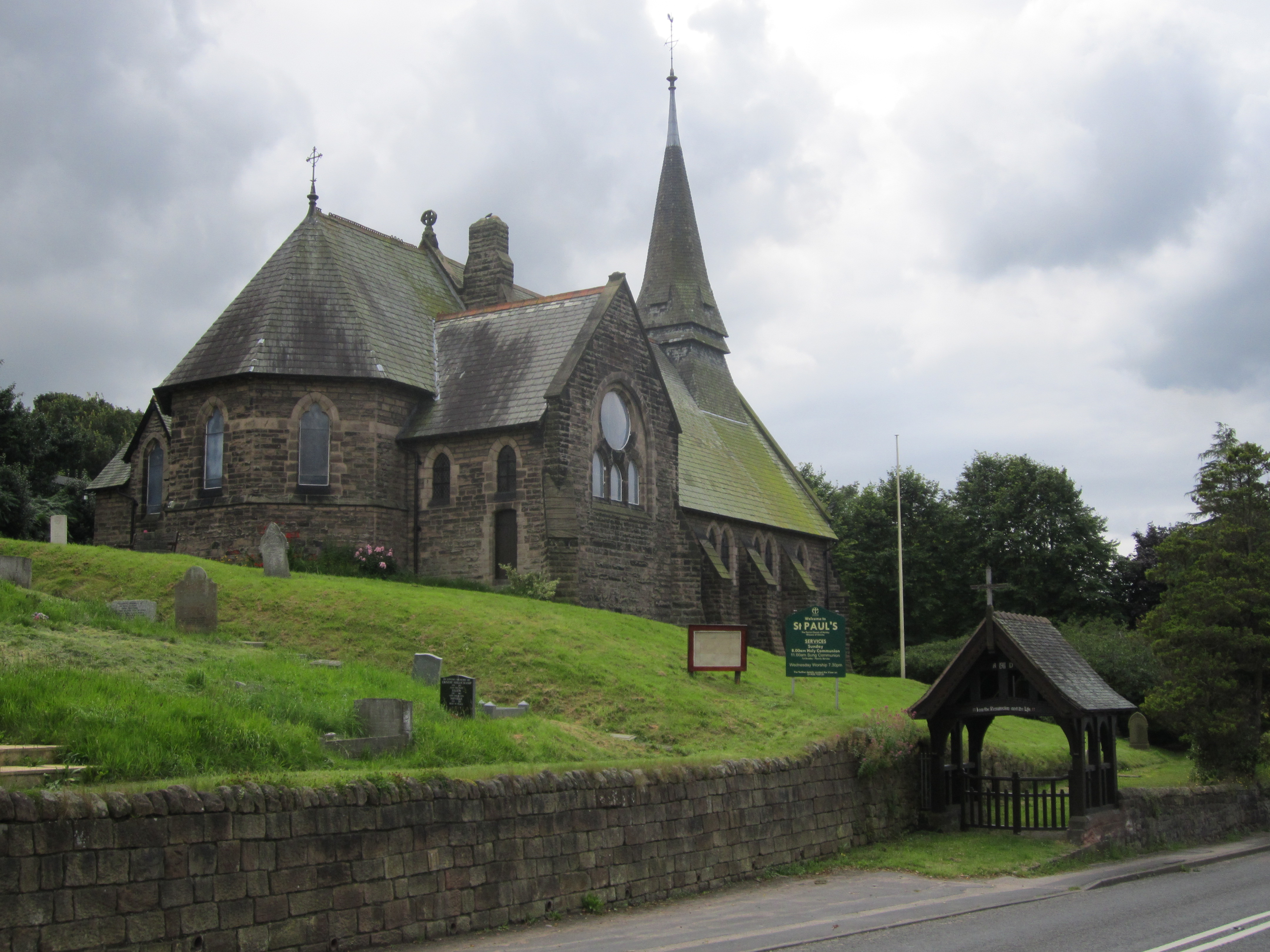
St Paul's Anglican Church

A Methodist church was established in 1800, seventy years before the Anglican church was built in 1870. Helsby is home to two primary schools (Helsby Hillside and Hornsmill) that serve the east and west of the village respectively, with the former being in close proximity to one of the most successful secondary schools in Cheshire for the 2018/2019 academic year: Helsby High School.

The village was once home to many pubs, the majority of which were adjacent to the A56 road.

A community Christmas event, Ho Ho Helsby, was held for the second time on 2 December 2017, with an estimated attendance of 2,500 people. It features artisan stalls, ice skating, reindeer, live music from local musicians and a twilight procession of floats featuring local schools, community groups and businesses. Knitted angels are hidden around the village in the run up to Christmas Day. The village also has its own craft beer, Ho Ho Helsbeer, brewed in a brewery less than two miles away. The event is organised entirely by volunteers.

== Transport ==
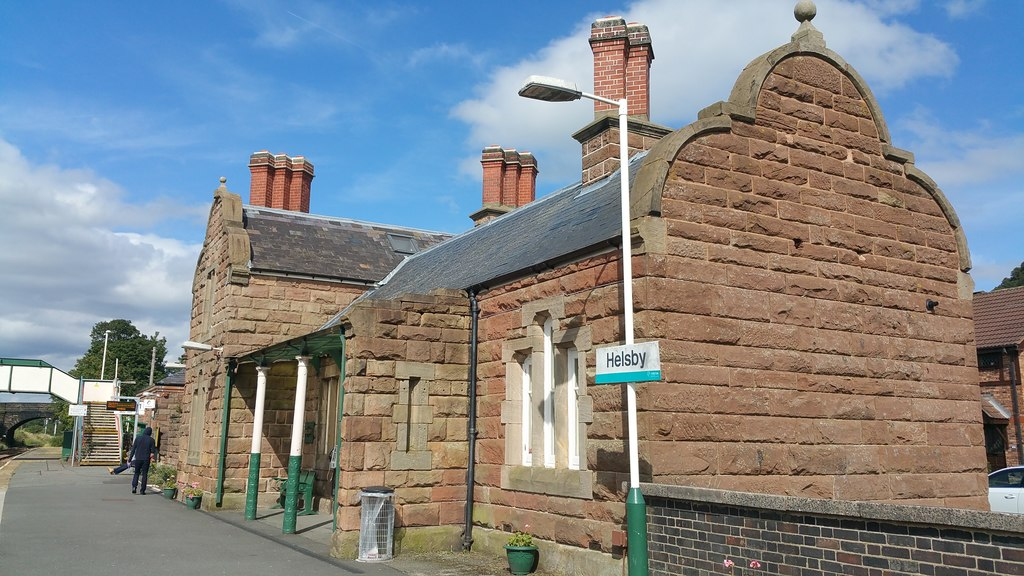
Helsby Railway Station

The railway came to Helsby in 1850, with the construction of the line between Chester and Warrington. Helsby railway station has won awards as one of the best kept unmanned stations in the UK. The signal box at Helsby Junction is still operated manually. Services are operated at approximately hourly intervals by Transport for Wales to Manchester Piccadilly and in the other direction to Chester and Llandudno. There is also a regular Transport For Wales service connecting Helsby from Chester to Liverpool Lime Street during the day and early evening as of 2024. The village had another railway station, Helsby and Alvanley railway station, which is closed.

There is also a minimal (parliamentary) service operated by Northern to neighbouring Ince & Elton and Stanlow & Thornton with trains terminating at Ellesmere Port where a connection is made with the Merseyrail electric service to Liverpool.

There are frequent bus links: X30 (Warrington to Chester), and X2 (Runcorn to Ellesmere Port). All these run Monday to Saturday only.

== Industry and economy ==
The factory site at the western end of the village has been for many years the main source of employment in the village. Originally built in 1884 by the Telegraph Manufacturing Company as the Britannia Telegraph Works, it manufactured telegraph and telephone cables. Early advertisements for cable hands specified that he "must be a good cricketer"! The company was taken over by the Automatic Telephone Manufacturing Company and the telephone equipment and instrument manufacturing sections moved to Liverpool in 1892. The cable works was more recently owned by BICC to make electronic cables. At peak employing 5,000 people, the number of workers declined from the Second World War. The decline continued following a series of redundancy initiatives started in 1970, and the site eventually closed in 2002. The site was then redeveloped for retail, light industrial and residential purposes. The first completed development on the site was a Tesco supermarket, which opened in September 2005. In 2005 cable manufacturing returned to Helsby when Heat Trace Limited, a British specialist cable manufacturer, took over one of the last remaining industrial buildings on the site to expand their operations, taking advantage of the existence of the electron beaming unit on the site for the irradiation of their specialist heating cables.

North west of Helsby, near the village of Ince, landowners The Peel Group are developing a 54 hectares (130 acres) industrial site on marshland. In 2009 a public inquiry gave permission to build a biomass power station, which opened in 2018 as part of the Protos "energy and resource hub". The site also houses a timber recycling plant and designated "nature areas". The construction of a facility to recover energy from non-recyclable waste began in 2020.

== Landmarks ==
=== Helsby Hill ===
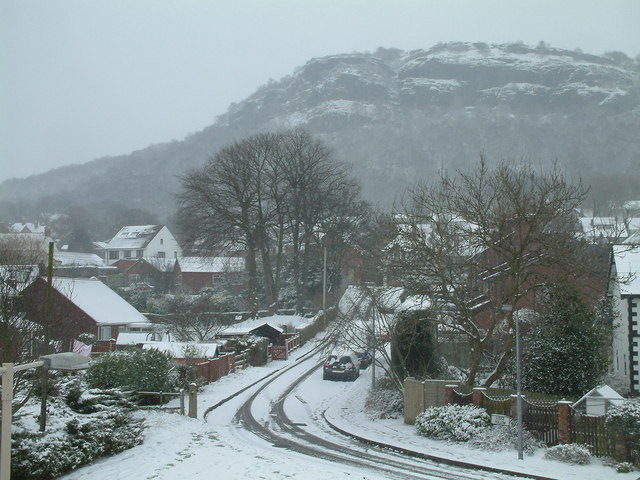
Helsby Hill

The village sits at the foot of a wooded sandstone hill 463 feet (141 m) above sea level. Helsby Hill has steep cliffs on the northern and western sides and is a prominent landmark rising above the Cheshire Plain and overlooking the Mersey estuary. Much of the hill is owned and managed by the National Trust. It is the site of Helsby hill fort, an ancient British hillfort, and more recently acquired a concrete pillar trig point on its summit. The top of the hill also has a former Royal Observer Corps post, which was abandoned in 1992. Visitors who see Helsby Hill from the M56 or on the train can sometimes see a man's face within the cliff face from east, west and sometimes from the north. This is referred to as the "Old Man of Helsby".

Access to hill

Numerous footpaths, running from the public roads encircling the hill, give ready access for walkers. One such path, known as Hill Road, runs through a large sandstone cutting, which was the route of a railway in the Second World War. The hilltop offers views of the Welsh hills and, on exceptionally clear days, Snowdon. The landmarks of Liverpool can clearly be seen beyond the Helsby marshes, Stanlow Oil Refinery, the Kemira fertiliser plant and the Manchester Ship Canal. Also on very clear days, visitors can see across Lancashire, past Bolton, to Winter Hill with its TV Mast. The view looking back is not as diverse, but the Peckforton Hills and Beeston Castle can be discerned.

Rock climbing

The craggy face of the hill provides many routes for rock climbers at a range of grades from easy climbs suitable for beginners (some of which do not require ropes), to challenging climbs up to a grade 6c. The cliff is also split into two lateral sections. The main face is easily accessible from the ground. At the top is a large grassy area, followed by an easily accessible 10-foot (or thereabouts) cliff to the summit, which is excellent for bouldering. Despite its often slimy appearance, the cliff's sandstone composition means it dries out quickly after rain, and, after several accidents, several large metal spikes were placed at the top of the main cliff for top-rope climbing that offer extra safety for climbers worried about the sandstone's crumbly nature. Two quarries in Harmers Wood, southwest of Helsby Hill, feature over sixty climbs of varying difficulty.

=== Mountskill Quarry ===
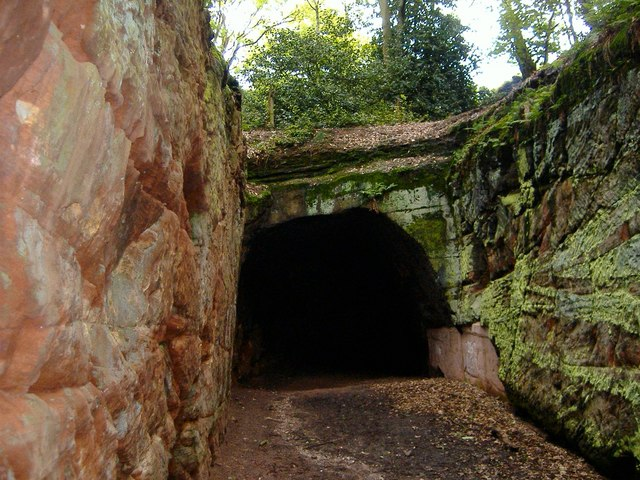
Mountskill Quarry

Sandstone was extracted from a working quarry from the early 19th century until the 1920s. Much of the stone was transported by ferry to Liverpool and Birkenhead, where several buildings, including the Customs House near Canning Dock, were built of Helsby stone. The quarry originally had its own dedicated horse-drawn tramway link to Ince Pier. After stone production ceased, it was not until the late 1980s that an alternative use was found for the site and in the intervening decades the derelict site was used as a tip by local residents. The site was acquired by the former Vale Royal Borough Council in 1988 and transformed into a woodland park, which was opened in 1990. 'Helsby Quarry Woodland Park' is now managed by Cheshire West and Chester Council. It contains a range of trees including oak, sycamore, rowan, silver birch, willow and beech—some of which grew naturally during the site's period of dereliction, and some of which were planted specifically in preparing the woodland park. The woodland and grassland are inhabited by many animal and bird species. Aside from the wildlife, the geology of the site is one of its most significant features and it is designated a Regionally Important Geological Site. The site features exposed rock walls and a tunnel, which enable sandstone formations from the Triassic period (251–199 million years ago) to be viewed.

== Notable people ==
- J. Slater Lewis (1852 in Rake House, Helsby – 1901) a British engineer, inventor, business manager and early author on management and cost accounting.
- Ted Oldfield (1918 in Helsby – 2006) an English footballer who played at right-half for Port Vale F.C.
- Heathcote Williams (1941 in Helsby – 2017) an English poet, actor, political activist and dramatist
- Tim Stead (1952 near Helsby – 2000), sculptor and furniture maker who worked primarily in wood.
- Caradog Jones (born 1962), the first Welshman to reach the summit of Mount Everest, lives in Helsby.

== See also ==
- Listed buildings in Helsby
