= Stanlow Oil Refinery =

English oil refinery

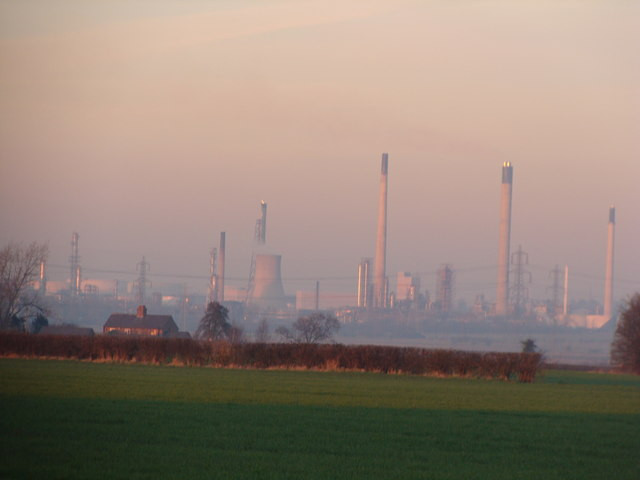
- The refinery from a distance in 2007

- Location within Cheshire
- Location: Cheshire, North West England, England, United Kingdom; 53°16′22″N 2°50′24″W

Refinery details
- Operator: Shell UK (1924-2011); EET Fuels (2011-present)
- Owner: Essar Energy (2011-present)
- Opened: 1924
- Capacity: 296,000 barrels per day (47,100 m^{3}/d)
- No. of employees: 960

Stanlow Refinery is an oil refinery owned by Essar Energy in Ellesmere Port, North West England. Until 2011, it was owned by Shell UK. The refinery is situated on the south bank of the Manchester Ship Canal, which is used to transport seaborne oil for refining and chemicals for Essar.

Stanlow has a refining capacity of 12 million tonnes per year with a barrel per day capacity of 296,000. Consequently, it is the second largest in the United Kingdom after Fawley Refinery, and produces a sixth of the UK's petrol needs. Stanlow is also a large producer for commodities such as jet fuel and diesel.

Although situated in North West England, the refinery serves much of England as it is linked to the UK oil pipeline network. Oil is delivered to the Tranmere Oil Terminal via ship, then pumped to Stanlow for refining and stored for delivery.

== History ==
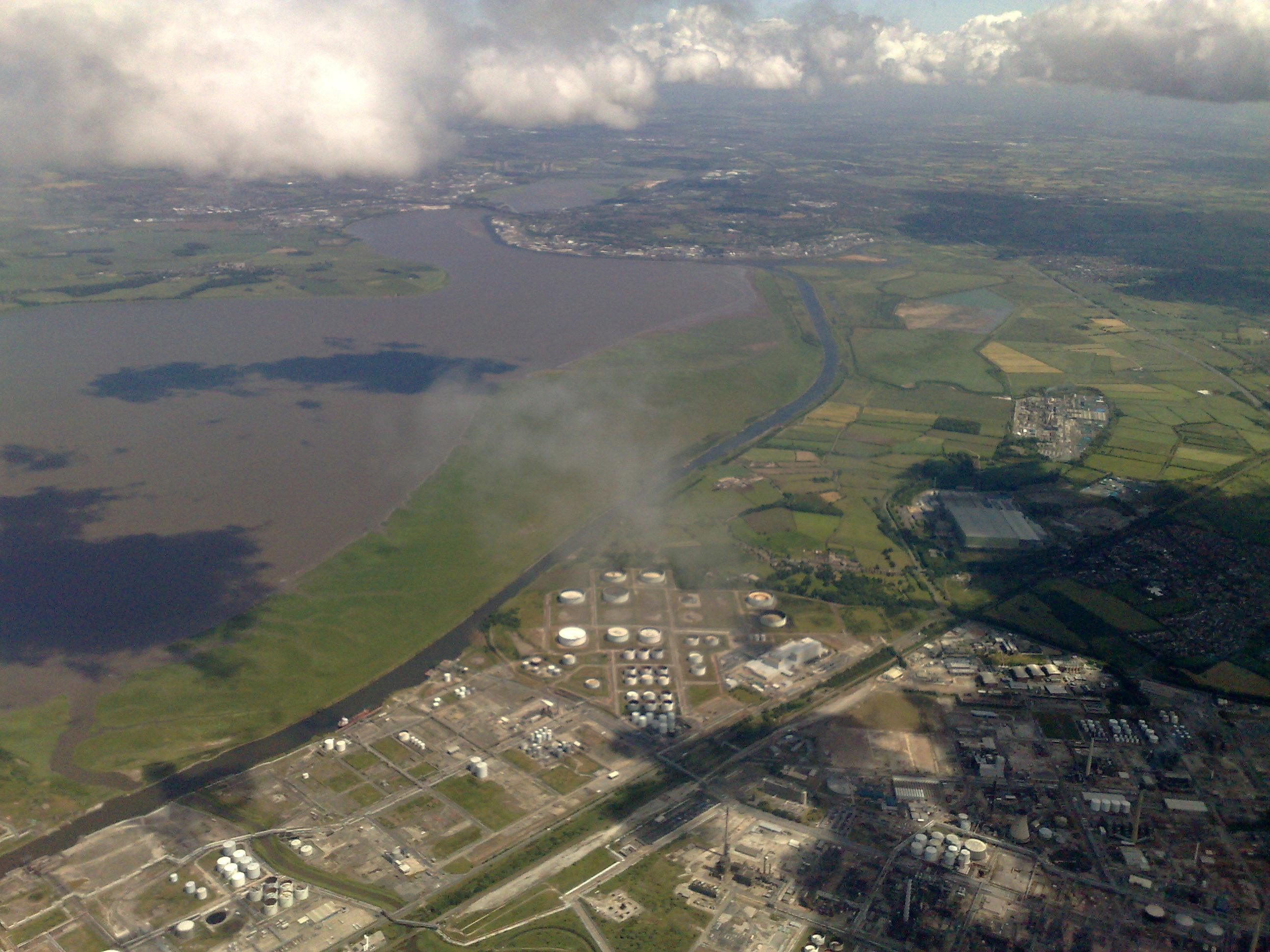
Stanlow Oil Refinery from the air

The refinery occupies nearly 1,900 acres (7.7 km^{2}) near the River Mersey and dates back to 1924, when a small bitumen plant was established. Stanlow & Thornton railway station was opened in 1940 to give workers access to the site and the facility an extra mode of transport. However, this station is now only served by three trains daily towards each of Ellesmere Port (westbound) and Helsby (eastbound), with these services scheduled to depart at times which would be inconvenient for the workers.

In 1974 an oil pipeline was commissioned from Amlwch, Anglesey to Stanlow. Crude oil was pumped ashore from tankers moored at deep-water pontoons to a holding station at Rhosgoch, from there it was pumped through two 36-inch diameter pipelines, 127 km to Stanlow. The pipeline had closed by 1990.

Crude oil is now received lower down river on the Mersey at the Tranmere Oil Terminal, operated by the Mersey Docks and Harbour Company from its Liverpool headquarters, and is transferred via a fifteen-mile (24 km) pipeline to storage at Stanlow. Output is delivered via various means, including by pipeline via the UK oil pipeline network, road and the Manchester Ship Canal. There is also a pipeline for jet fuel to Manchester Airport.

In 2010, Royal Dutch Shell declared their desire to sell off some refineries in Europe to concentrate on emerging markets in Asia and the Middle East, which led to the possibility that Stanlow would be shut down indefinitely. However, Shell said that a number of refineries in their portfolio offered over-capacity and consequently Stanlow, their last British refinery, was put up for sale.

After a prolonged period of negotiation, Stanlow was sold by Shell to Essar Energy for approximately $1.3 billion (£814 million) in 2011. Essar has stated their desire to expand the site with a 25% increase in output. Following the bankruptcy of Petroplus which ran the Coryton Refinery in January 2012, Essar stated their belief that Stanlow, being a large refinery, would be able to compete with refineries in Asia and the Middle East. Essar plan a £250 million expansion of Stanlow, with production of diesel and aviation fuel to be increased. In April 2021 the company was reported to be heavily in debt after fossil fuel demand dropped during the COVID-19 pandemic. In September 2021 it was reported that the facility is at the "brink of collapse".

In February 2023, Essar launched Essar Energy Transition for the development of what has been reported as the 'UK's leading energy transition hub' as part of the regional decarbonisation cluster known as Hynet, alongside a $2.4 billion (£1.9 billion) investment in the refinery.

In December 2023, the company reported $66.3 million (£51.7 million) of profit on $11.8 billion (£9 billion) of revenue in its annual results to March 2023.

Stanlow operator, Essar Oil UK, changed its trading name to EET Fuels in January 2024 and announced that $1.2 billion would be allocated to support the refinery’s industrial decarbonisation. The refinery announced its plan to reduce carbon emissions by 95 per cent by 2030 through industrial carbon capture and switching from natural gas and other refinery fuel sources to hydrogen as a fuel.

In July 2024, EET Fuels announced its plan to build Europe’s first hydrogen-ready combined heat and power plant at Stanlow, which is currently scheduled for completion in 2027 and operational by 2028 or 2029. In the same month, it was reported that the refinery plans to invest in infrastructure and extra capacity to increase its national footprint.

== Stanlow Island ==
Stanlow Island is a small island found on the Manchester Ship Canal outside the Stanlow oil refinery. The island was occupied until the 1990s when the locals left due to isolation and the hazards of living nearby the refinery. Notable structures are the remains of Stanlow Abbey founded in 1178 that remain at Stanlow Point. Access to the island using a 24-hour request ferry that links the Essar refinery to Stanlow Island with special permission.

== Environmental compliance and pollution incidents ==
Investigations by the BBC and SourceMaterial revealed that Stanlow's operator, EET Fuels, breached its environmental permit conditions 58 times across 2023 and 2024—more than any other refinery in England. The Environment Agency (EA) consistently graded Stanlow in its lowest compliance brackets (E or F) every year from 2018 onwards, receiving an 'F' rating in 2023 before improving to an 'E' in 2024. Reports detailed severe exceedances of regulated discharge caps, including airborne sulphur dioxide emissions up to seven times legal limits, as well as spills of oil, cyanide, and benzene into the River Gowy, Manchester Ship Canal, and Thornton Brook.

On 12 September 2024, heavy rainfall combined with out-of-service treatment equipment caused over one tonne of oily wastewater to discharge into Thornton Brook, spreading more than a mile into the Mersey Estuary, a designated Site of Special Scientific Interest (SSSI). The spill led to a seven-week precautionary closure of local commercial cockle beds and prompted a criminal investigation by the EA. Natural England initially investigated the ecological damage but closed its case after determining that seven of the refinery's 16 discharge points contained "no limit set" for daily oil discharge volumes under its existing permit—a policy criticized by environmental groups as a regulatory loophole. In response to the disclosures, EET Fuels stated that historic exceedances did not reflect its current operational standards and highlighted over £24 million in capital investments aimed at upgrading wastewater infrastructure.

== Protests ==
- Stanlow's position as one of the largest and well-known refineries in the country, has led to numerous protests over a number of decades. In the UK fuel crisis of 2000, protests over government taxation on fuel began at Stanlow. A large fuel price protest was staged in May 2011 with the objective of "shutting down" the refinery.
- During the 2022 Russian invasion of Ukraine, dockworkers of the Unite union began to refuse to unload Russian oil from any ship. Despite sanctions on Russian shipping, Russian oil continued to arrive at port on ships owned and flagged in other countries. Dockworkers have called this a loophole in sanctions.

== Statistics ==
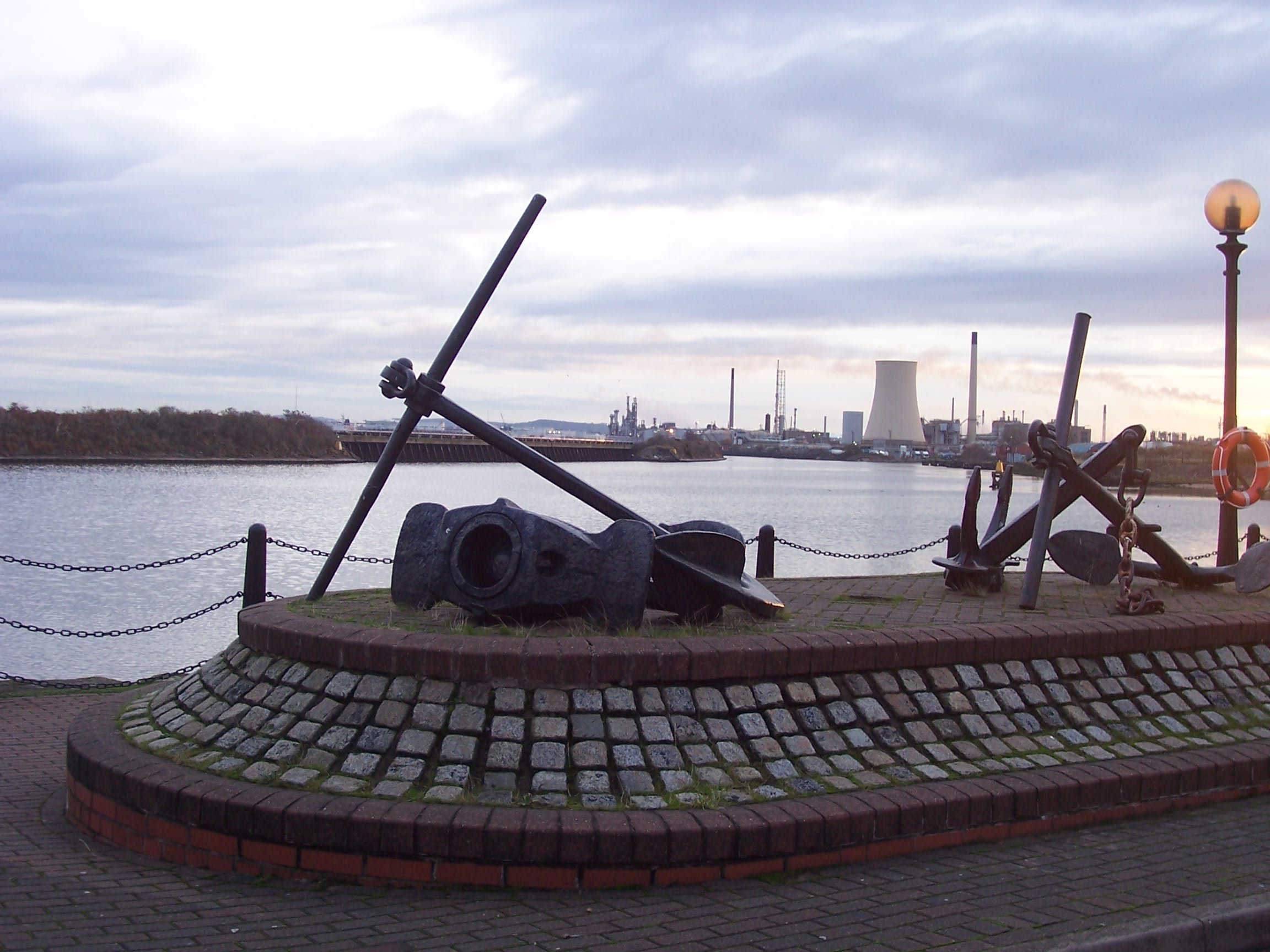
Manchester Ship Canal from Ellesmere Port Dock towards Stanlow Refinery

- Storage capacity: 2 million tonnes of crude oil and products
- Refining capacity: 12 million tonnes per year. The manufacturing complex employs 800 people.
- Barrel per day output: 272,000 bbl/d (43,200 m^{3}/d)
- Product output
  - petrol 3 million tonnes
  - diesel 3.5 million tonnes
  - kerosene/jet fuel 2 million tonnes
  - LPG & petrochemical feedstocks 1.5 million tonnes
  - Fuel oil 1 million tonnes

== Haydock terminal ==
Haydock terminal
- Interactive map of Haydock terminal
- Location: Haydock, Lancashire, England; 53.47764°N 2.65983°W

Refinery details
- Operator: BP and Shell-Mex
- Owners: BP and Shell-Mex
- Opened: 1969
- Closed: 1988
- Area: 90 acres (36 ha)
- Capacity: 22 million gallons (100,000 m3) of white oil and 42 million gallons (191,000 m3) of black oil per year.
- No. of employees: 260
- No. of oil tanks: 30
- Refining center: No, tank farm and road tanker filling

In 1969 Shell-Mex & BP opened a £3 million joint venture bulk hydrocarbon liquid distribution centre at Haydock, Lancashire (53.47764 N, 2.65983 W). This was built on a 90-acre (36.4 ha), site although only 20.2 ha were developed in the first stage. The terminal reflected the growing use of oil as an energy source in the development of North West England. The oil supply companies wished to make oil available at appropriate locations and when needed; and to modernise the distribution of oil to improve efficiency. The terminal was designed to store up to 1 million tonnes of oil, making it the largest inland oil depot in Europe. It handled 5,000 tonnes of oil products daily, comprising 22 million gallons (100,000 m^{3}) of white oils and 42 million gallons (191,000 m^{3}) of black oils a year.

The terminal was near the St Helens branch railway from which a branch led to loading and off-loading sidings in the terminal. Heavy oils were delivered by two trains per day from Stanlow, and one daily train from Heysham refinery. The terminal was supplied with light oils via a 41.6 km (150 mm diameter) pipeline from Stanlow refinery. Oil products were loaded into a fleet of 100 road tankers for distribution. Upon arrival at the terminal road tankers were directed automatically to an empty stand where filling took place from an overhead gantry.

The terminal employed 260 staff including 170 drivers working a two shift, six days per week system.

In 1987 Shell undertook a review of the distribution of oil across the UK. It intended to make the most of improved road networks in the country. As a result the company spent £17 million in developing a new distribution network. This included development and rebuilding of the distribution centre adjacent to the Stanlow refinery and at the oil terminal at Shell Haven in Essex. However, the review identified that the Haydock terminal should close. Thirty-two of the tanker drivers based at Haydock were transferred to Stanlow, together with some clerical jobs at Haydock. The Haydock terminal closed in 1988. The site was eventually redeveloped as a commercial estate.

== Cultural references ==
The refinery inspired the Orchestral Manoeuvres in the Dark (OMD) song "Stanlow", which featured on the album Organisation (1980). OMD frontman Andy McCluskey's father worked at the site, enabling the band to record samples of the refinery's machinery for use on the track. The band Jesu named a song on Conqueror (2007) after the refinery.

== See also ==
- Petroleum refining in the United Kingdom
- Tranmere Oil Terminal
- UK oil pipeline network
- Oil terminals in the United Kingdom
