= Sutton Tunnel railway accident =

1851 railway incident in Cheshire, England

Coordinates: 53.3202°N 2.6779°W

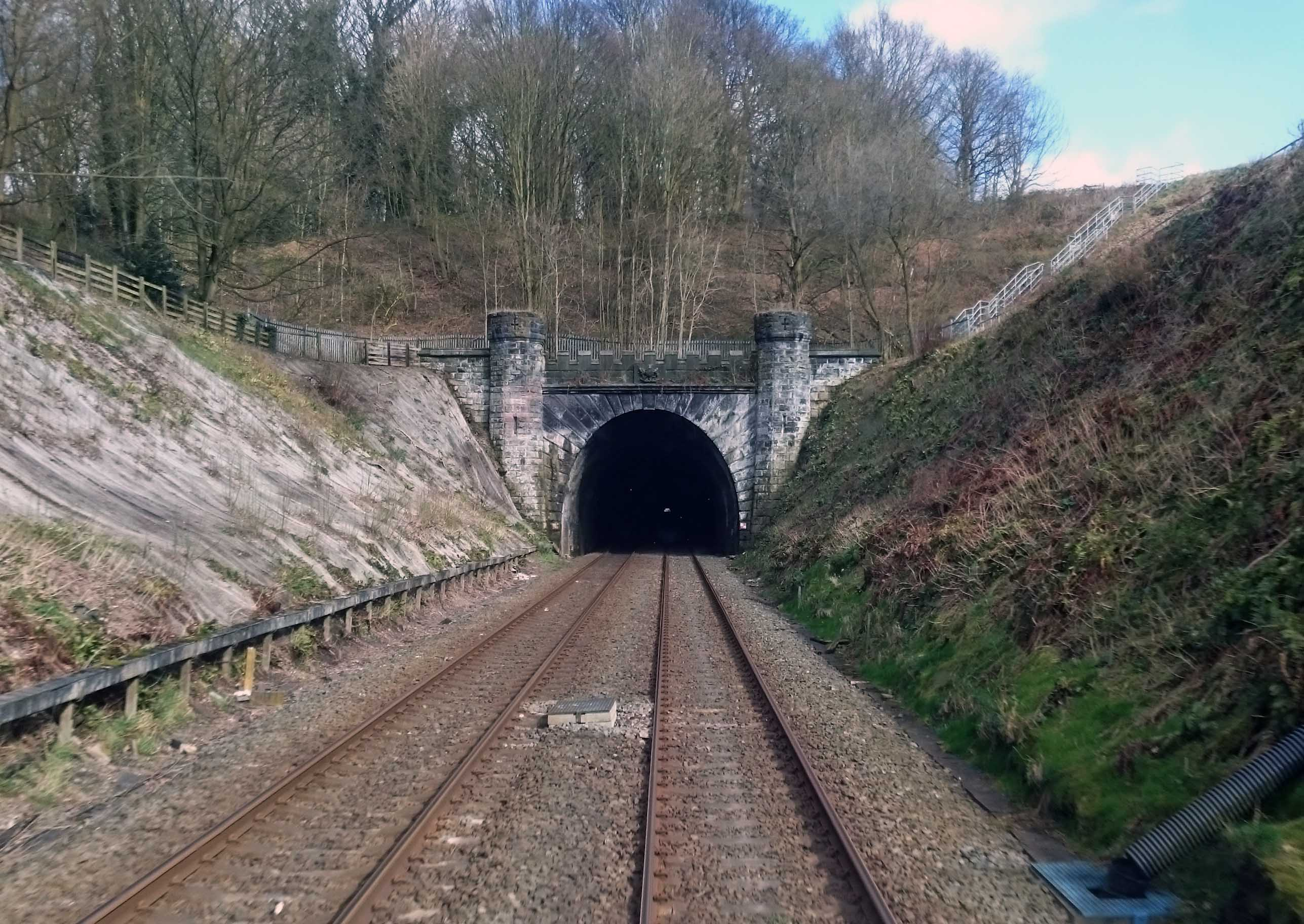
- Southern portal of Sutton Tunnel

Details
- Date: 30 April 1851; 20:03
- Location: Frodsham, Cheshire
- Country: England
- Line: Chester to Manchester Line
- Cause: Unprotected train (no signals)

Statistics
- Trains: 3
- Passengers: ~1600
- Deaths: 9
- Injured: 30–40

The Sutton Tunnel railway accident occurred in the Sutton tunnel between Frodsham and Moore in Cheshire, England on 30 April 1851. As a result of it nine people died and between 30 and 40 were injured.

== Accident ==
On 18 December 1850 a new railway was opened between Chester and Warrington by the Birkenhead, Lancashire and Cheshire Junction Railway. This halved the distance by rail between Manchester and Chester as trains could travel via Warrington rather than via Crewe. An early attraction to be served by the new line was Chester Races, in particular the Chester Cup on 30 April 1851. The line was advertised as The Direct Route to Chester Races and it is estimated that 4,000 people gathered at Manchester Victoria station during the morning of that day. The trains struggled to get the passengers to Chester, with one train arriving 2½ hours late and passengers from another train of 50 carriages having to walk part of the way.

After the races, by 6 pm one train had already left Chester General station and soon after another train carrying about 430 passengers departed. A further train was standing in sidings with a notice "Manchester via Warrington" on its side. People crossed the line and completely filled the train. It was estimated that 900 passengers were crowded into 18 small carriages. The train left the siding at about 6.50 pm hauled by the locomotive Druid. It was assisted up the incline from Chester station by another locomotive, No. 16, pushing at the back. No. 16 returned to Chester to collect its own train and the train pulled by Druid made "good speed" to Frodsham where some passengers left it. By then it had begun to rain, this had turned to sleet, and the driving wheels had started to slip. From Frodsham station to the Sutton Weaver Viaduct there is an adverse gradient of 1:240 and the fireman and a local platelayer sanded the rails. Despite this the train made only slow progress, even on the level viaduct. Beyond the viaduct the tunnel also had an adverse gradient of 1:264 and it was a struggle to keep the train moving. By this time the train hauled by No. 16 had left Chester with only 430 passengers and was catching up with Druid's train. By the time it arrived near Sutton tunnel it was only 60–70 yards (55–65 m) behind it. Druid's guard signalled to the following train to come behind and push his train. This it did but then No. 16's wheels also began to slip. In the middle of the 1-mile-154-yard (1.750 km) tunnel the two trains came to a virtual or complete halt.

By now the next train, pulled by Albert, had arrived in Frodsham station and it was allowed to leave two minutes later. This was 14 minutes after No. 16's train had left and 24 minutes after Druid's train; the company's rules allowed trains to pass intermediate stations at intervals of five minutes. Albert's train entered the tunnel at 15–20 miles per hour (25–30 km/h). The driver noticed a lot of steam in the tunnel and stated that he slowed, but his train collided with the rear of No. 16's train. The guard from No. 16's train walked back with a red light and stopped the next train on the viaduct. Two doctors were called from Frodsham and one from Halton village. In the accident five people had been killed outright and four died later. Between 30 and 40 people were injured. About 1,600 people were crowded inside the tunnel in complete darkness.

== Inquest and report ==
An inquest was held in Preston Brook and the jury returned a verdict of accidental death. The jury also added their unanimous opinion that the company should accept "great blame" and that "there was a want of prudence and discretion" on the part of the "officers and servants" of the company. A report was prepared by Captain R. M. Laffan who was appointed by the Commissioners of Railways. Captain Laffan was critical of the secretary of the company, the locomotive superintendent, the three drivers, two of the guards and the Frodsham station master, but in particular he blamed the executive committee of the railway company. He made six recommendations: a station should be built at each end of the tunnel and that the stations should be connected by an electric telegraph; two guards should be provided on each train rather than one; the locomotive stock and number of carriages should be increased; a more efficient staff should be engaged; all passenger carriages passing through the tunnel should be provided with lights; the interval of five minutes between trains should be increased. The stations were built. At the Frodsham end the station went first by the name of Runcorn, then Runcorn Road, and finally Halton; it is now closed. At the other end was Norton station, which has been replaced by Runcorn East station.
