= Runcorn East railway station =

Railway station in Cheshire, England

Coordinates: 53.327°N 2.665°W

Runcorn East
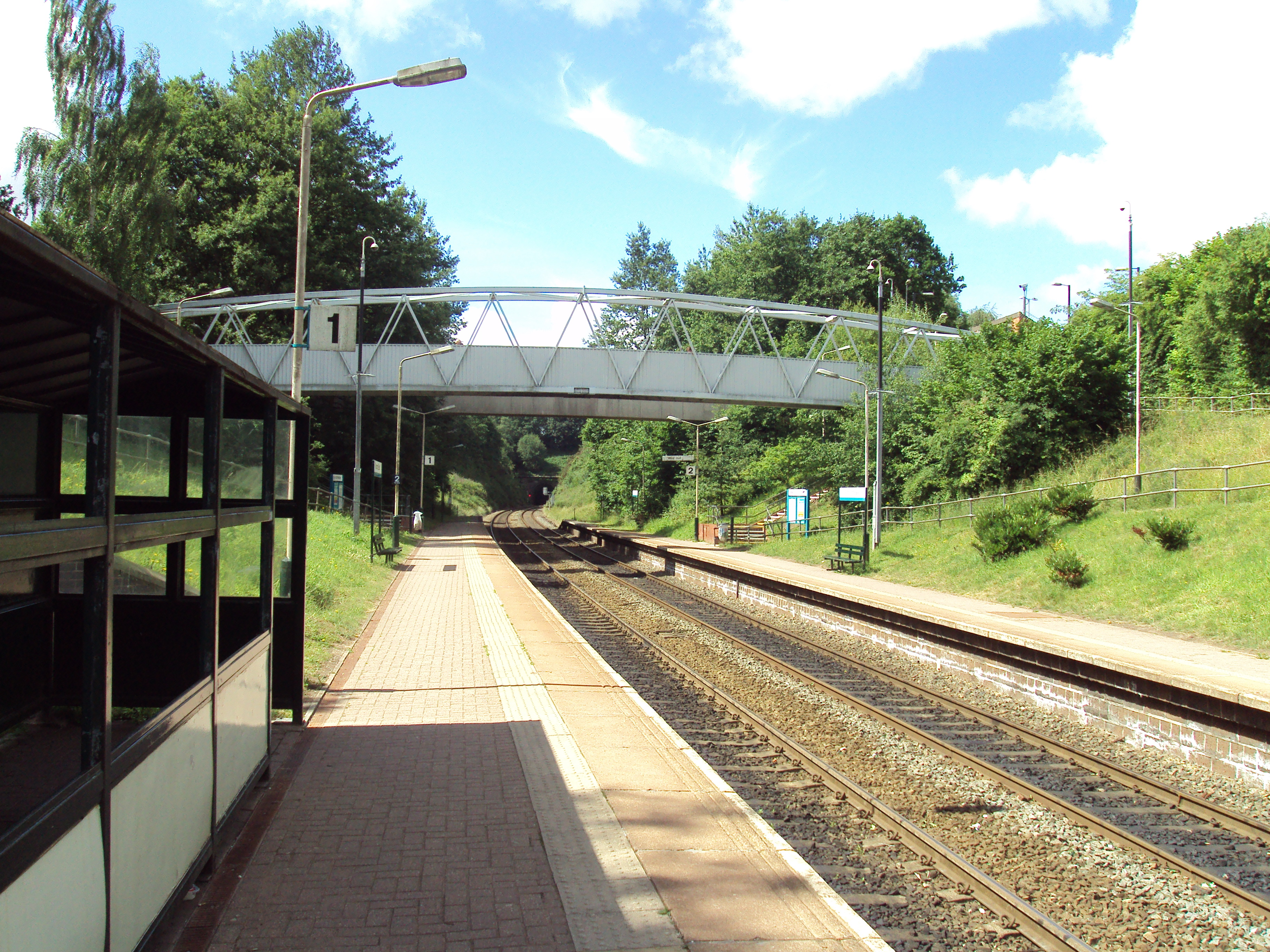

General information
- Location: Runcorn, Halton; England
- Grid reference: SJ557814
- Managed by: Transport for Wales
- Platforms: 2

Other information
- Station code: RUE
- Classification: DfT category E

History
- Original company: British Rail

Key dates
- 3 October 1983: Station opened

Passengers
- 2020/21: ▼32,350
- 2021/22: ▲0.120 million
- 2022/23: ▲0.165 million
- 2023/24: ▲0.175 million
- 2024/25: ▲0.196 million
Location
Notes
- Passenger statistics from the Office of Rail and Road

Runcorn East railway station serves the eastern suburbs of Runcorn in Cheshire, England, offering train services to Warrington and Manchester and to Chester and North Wales.

== History ==
The station opened by British Rail on 3 October 1983 to serve the new suburbs of Runcorn New Town. It is situated a short distance from the site of the former Norton station (closed by the British Transport Commission in 1952) and the nearby signal box still bears this name.

The station was formally adopted by the North Cheshire Rail Users group on 16 May 2008, under the Arriva Trains Wales Adopt a Station Initiative.

== Facilities ==
Arriva began looking into the possibility of installing scrolling information screens on the platforms, with train running information in 2008. An initial site survey was carried out on 30 May 2008 with a follow-up on 20 September 2008. A third site survey was carried out in January 2010; this also included a PA system being installed, looking at improving CCTV coverage over the station and improvements for disabled access to the station. On 17 January 2011 site work started on the installation of information screens on both platforms - these are now completed and operational (as of May 2011).

The station has a staffed ticket office - this is staffed six days per week (not Sundays) from the start of the morning peak until early afternoon. At other times tickets can be purchased from self-service ticket machines (card payments only) available on both platforms. Waiting shelters and bench seating is provided at platform level. Step-free access to both platforms is via ramps from the footbridge that links the ticket office and car park.

== Services ==
Runcorn East is served by an hourly Transport for Wales service to Manchester Piccadilly via Warrington Bank Quay. Many of these are extended through to Manchester Airport outside of weekday peak periods.

In the other direction, services run to Chester, with most trains continuing along the North Wales Coast Line to Holyhead (services terminate at Chester in the late evening & on Sundays). The 1-mile-125-yard (1,724 m) Sutton tunnel is just west of the station.

The new Northern Trains Northern Connect service, between Leeds and Chester via Manchester Victoria and Halifax, calls at weekday peak periods only since its inauguration in May 2019.

Preceding station	National Rail	Following station
Helsby	Northern Trains; Ellesmere Port to Warrington Line; Mondays–Saturdays only	Warrington Bank Quay
Frodsham	Northern Trains; Chester to Leeds; Peak hours only	Warrington Bank Quay
Frodsham	Transport for Wales; Chester to Manchester Line	Warrington Bank Quay
	Historical railways	
Halton	Birkenhead Joint Railway	Norton

=== Public transport interchange ===
The Runcorn Busway connects the station to Runcorn Shopping City, and to Widnes via Runcorn Old Town. The station is also connected by an Arriva North West bus service to the main Runcorn station (operated by Avanti West Coast), which has services to London Euston, Birmingham New Street, Crewe and Liverpool via the West Coast Main Line.

== Bibliography ==
- Mitchell, Vic; Smith, Keith (2013). Chester to Warrington. West Sussex: Middleton Press. figs. 77-78. ISBN 9781908174406. OCLC 910526793.
