= Halton Curve =

Short section of railway line in Cheshire, England

Coordinates: 53.31°N 2.70°W

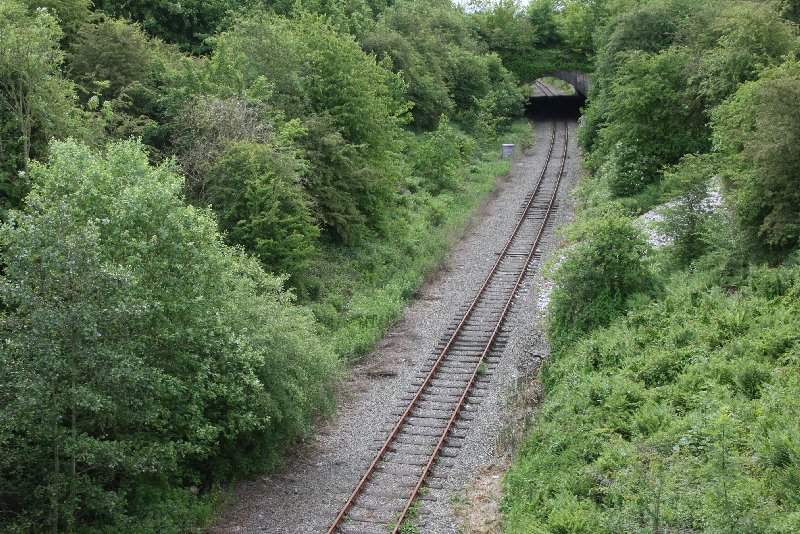
- Halton Curve in 2012 prior to commencement of upgrade work

Overview
- Status: Operational
- Owner: Network Rail
- Locale: Cheshire, Halton, (North West England)
- Termini: Frodsham Junction; Halton Junction

Service
- Type: Regional rail, Heavy rail
- System: National Rail
- Operator: Transport for Wales
- Rolling stock: Class 197 "Civity"

History
- Opened: 1 May 1873

Technical
- Line length: 1.7 mi (2.7 km)
- Number of tracks: Single (1)
- Track gauge: 4 ft 8 1/2 in (1,435 mm)
- Loading gauge: W8
- Electrification: Not electrified
- Operating speed: 40 mph (64 km/h) maximum

Halton Curve (now formally known as the Frodsham Single Line) is a short bi-directional railway line which links the Chester–Warrington line to the Weaver Junction–Liverpool line within the borough of Halton, Cheshire. The route, which is 1 mile 54 chains (2.7 km) long, is between Frodsham Junction (north of Frodsham) and Halton Junction (south of Runcorn). After having no regular services for more than four decades, the line was upgraded and reopened in 2019 by Network Rail, enabling hourly passenger trains between Chester and Liverpool.

The route, which was opened by the London and North Western Railway on 1 May 1873, created a direct link between the industries in North Wales and the factories of south Lancashire and the Port of Liverpool. Passenger services also used the route. However, the Great Depression in the 1930s began the steady decline in heavy industry and manufacturing in southern Lancashire. Although the route escaped the Beeching cuts in the 1960s, all passenger services were withdrawn by the mid-1970s. The double-tracked line was reduced to a single track in the early 1990s. A concerted campaign was launched to improve services on the line after it was nearly closed by Network Rail in the early 2000s.

In 2014 work began to upgrade the line so that it could be reopened for daily rail services. In May 2019, the first regular passenger trains restarted between Liverpool Lime Street and Chester via Liverpool South Parkway, Runcorn, Frodsham and Helsby.

== History ==
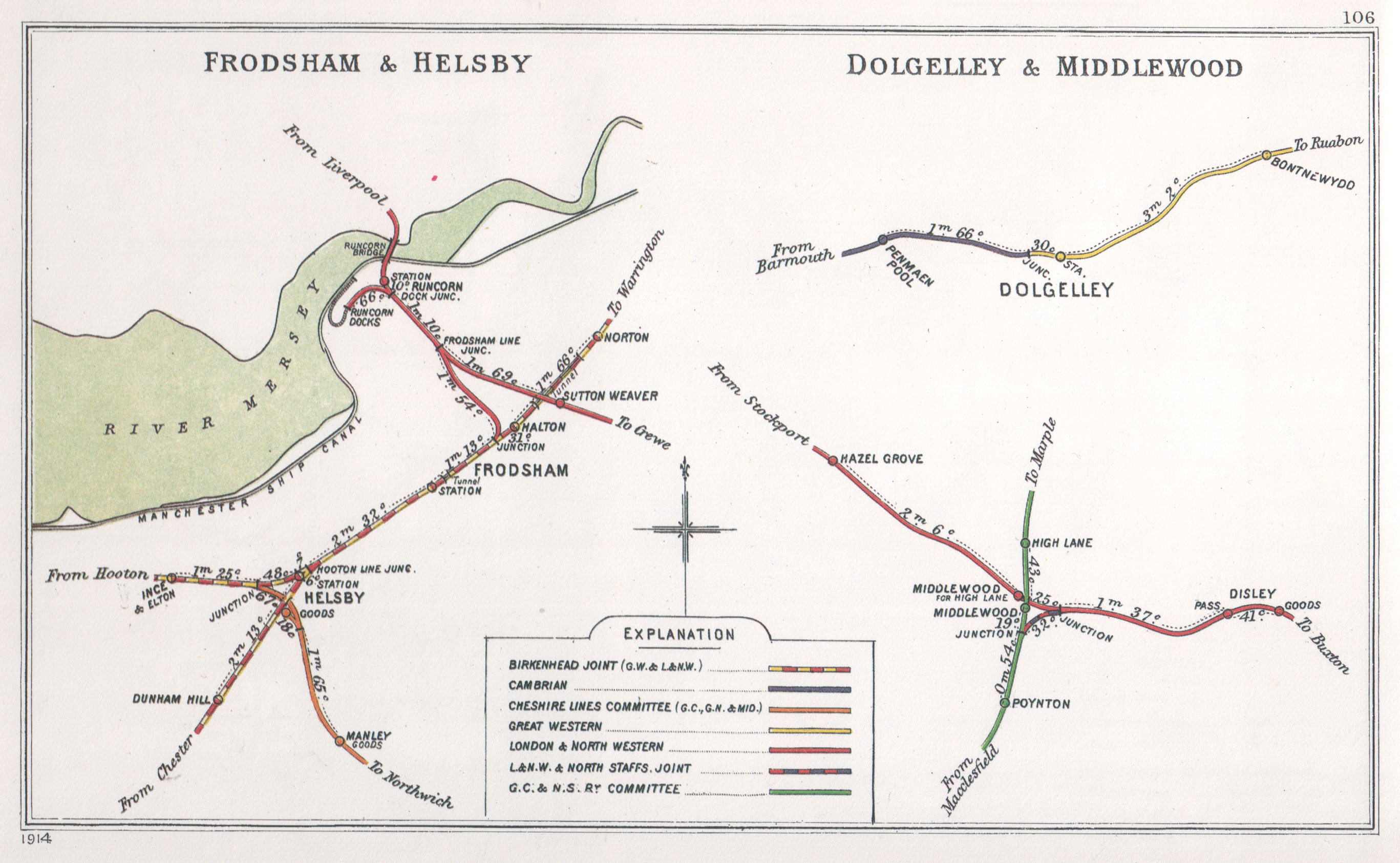
A 1914 Railway Clearing House Junction Diagram showing (left) the Halton curve between Frodsham and Runcorn

The LNWR built the Halton Curve to create a connection with the line from Chester to Frodsham that was built by the Birkenhead Joint Railway partnership. The double-tracked branch was built to link the mineral industries of North East Wales with the commercial and industrial areas of south Lancashire. Passenger services would also operate between Chester, Runcorn and Liverpool Lime Street. By the 1960s services using the curve had greatly reduced. In the late 1960s, the track was nearly abandoned when the M56 motorway was built as the route cut through the curve. However, a concrete and steel Bowstring arch truss bridge was built to keep the curve open. (Note: In July 1970, fire crews from Runcorn and Frodsham cooled down the bridge with their hoses because summer heat had caused its superstructure to expand, preventing it from being lowered into place.) At about the same time, the short (89yd) Beechwood Tunnel and an overbridge was added towards the north end of the line to carry the A5126 expressway over the line.

On 5 May 1975 the local passenger service was withdrawn from the line. During the 1980s and early 1990s, the line was used by a scheduled summer Saturdays-only return service between Liverpool Lime Street and Llandudno. But this ended when the double track was reduced to a single track in 1994 following the privatisation of British Rail. At the same time, the associated double points and diamond crossings for southbound trains were removed from both junctions. Only northbound trains (Frodsham → Runcorn) were able to use the line; it was re-classed as a single-line working. Railtrack's decision was based on reducing maintenance costs and, by removing the crossings and points on the Weaver Junction–Liverpool line, increase through-train speeds between Liverpool Lime Street and Crewe.

To avoid the expense and inconvenience of a statutory closure process of the Halton Curve, an early morning parliamentary train operated in the summer months every Saturday. Other services would include occasional freight, engineers trains and charter specials that did not require going via Crewe. Occasionally traffic between Liverpool and Crewe would also be diverted via the Halton Curve when the main line via Winsford was closed for engineering work. The Royal Train has used the branch line when Queen Elizabeth II has visited Liverpool.

Network Rail took over the ownership and management of the curve in 2002. The maximum speed on the line was 40 mph (64 km/h). Traffic using the Frodsham Junction was limited to 20 mph (32 km/h). This same speed limit applied to trains rejoining the 90 mph (140 km/h) West Coast Main Line near Runcorn. Signalboxes at Frodsham and Manchester continue to control the junctions at their respective ends of the curve.

=== Parliamentary train ===
The only timetabled service on the line was a summer-only parliamentary train: 07:53 Chester to Runcorn (2F80) operated by Northern. The service, which was non-stop between Chester and Runcorn, was only on certain Saturdays during the summer until September. A Class 150 or Class 156 two-carriage diesel multiple unit was used.

Due to the rarity of rail traffic using the Halton Curve, the parliamentary train became a popular service among local people and railway enthusiasts.

== Reinstatement ==
=== Campaign ===
In 2004, the Strategic Rail Authority announced that it intended to close the line because of proposals to upgrade signalling on the West Coast Main Line in the Runcorn area. The SRA thought that incorporating the curve into the scheme added a significant extra cost that was not justified given the line's scant service. Closure of the line was then proposed but these plans were later withdrawn in response local authorities and other organisations campaigning to upgrade the line. This resulted in a concerted effort by the North Cheshire Rail Users Group for the reintroduction of regular services.

Merseytravel proposed upgrading the Halton Curve to operate bidirectionally (which would need a new crossover at Halton Junction), providing a second fast rail route between Liverpool and Chester. Other new services could include direct trains from Liverpool Lime Street to Wrexham or Llandudno via Liverpool South Parkway (Liverpool John Lennon Airport) and Runcorn, which would provide direct access to Liverpool Airport for passengers from Chester, Wrexham and various towns along the northern coast of Wales.

In conjunction with the above proposal, Halton Borough Council began investigating the possibility of opening a station at Beechwood to provide a convenient interchange with Runcorn busway.

=== Consultation ===
On 8 March 2005, the then Transport Minister Tony McNulty announced in Parliament that resignalling work that was currently scheduled for 2010 would resolve the Halton Curve issue.

But in July 2012, the Conservative-Liberal coalition-led government said it was not including the Halton Curve in a £9.4 billion rail improvement scheme despite the scheme having "recognisable benefits". Chemical manufacture Ineos ChlorVinyls said it was evaluating the possibility of using the Halton Curve for delivery of refuse-derived fuel to its Runcorn site; the proposal was part of a wider assessment being undertaken in support of its plan to redevelop the site.

Network Rail's draft Route Utilisation Strategy for Wales discussed the future of the line. It proposed an hourly service between Liverpool and Chester via Runcorn and Helsby calling at all stations except Edge Hill. However, the scheme would only be feasible if the curve was restored to bidirectional operation. The RUS document recommended that further development work take place.

=== Upgrade ===
In January 2014, Merseytravel announced that it would fund research into the re-development of the Halton Curve, stating that there were benefits for Liverpool commuters and those using Liverpool John Lennon airport. The research project was to be done in conjunction with Merseytravel, Halton Borough Council, the Welsh Government and six county authorities in the north of Wales. Merseytravel recommended that the line should be referred to as the Mersey Dee Link to counter the perception that "the project benefits fall to Halton and Halton alone".

In July 2014, The Chancellor of the Exchequer, George Osborne, announced £10.4m of funding to redevelop the line had been secured. The reopened route should improve connectivity between the Weaver Vale area and Liverpool John Lennon Airport as well as permitting through services between Liverpool and northern Wales via Liverpool South Parkway. In August 2014 Merseytravel presented the Liverpool City Region Long Term Rail Strategy to regional city leaders. The 30-year plan for the network included possible uses for the curve such as connections to the south of Wales.

The Liverpool City Region Combined Authority approved the work in April 2016, using Government's Local Growth Fund (LGF) funding £10.4 million, adding an additional £5.67 million from the city's LGF. Engineering and signalling work started in July 2017 and was completed in May 2018.

In 2017, while the upgrade work was being completed, locomotive maker Alstom proposed using the line to test its zero-emission hydrogen fuel cell trains after it opened a new technology facility at Halebank.

=== Reopening ===
In May 2019 services were reintroduced between Liverpool Lime Street and Chester via Runcorn with one train per hour every day. Three trains a day (two to Liverpool and one from Liverpool) are extended to Wrexham General. The service calls at all stations between Chester and Liverpool South Parkway, then runs express to Lime Street. Transport for Wales Rail plans to extend the service along the North Wales Coast line to Llandudno in 2026, subject to agreement from Network Rail.

== Bibliography ==
- Yonge, John; Padgett, David; Szwenk, John (August 2013) [1990]. Bridge, Mike (ed.). Railway Track Diagrams 4: Midlands & North West (3rd ed.). Bradford on Avon: Trackmaps. ISBN 978-0-9549866-7-4.
