= Stanlow and Thornton railway station =

Railway station in Cheshire, England

Coordinates: 53.278°N 2.841°W

Stanlow and Thornton
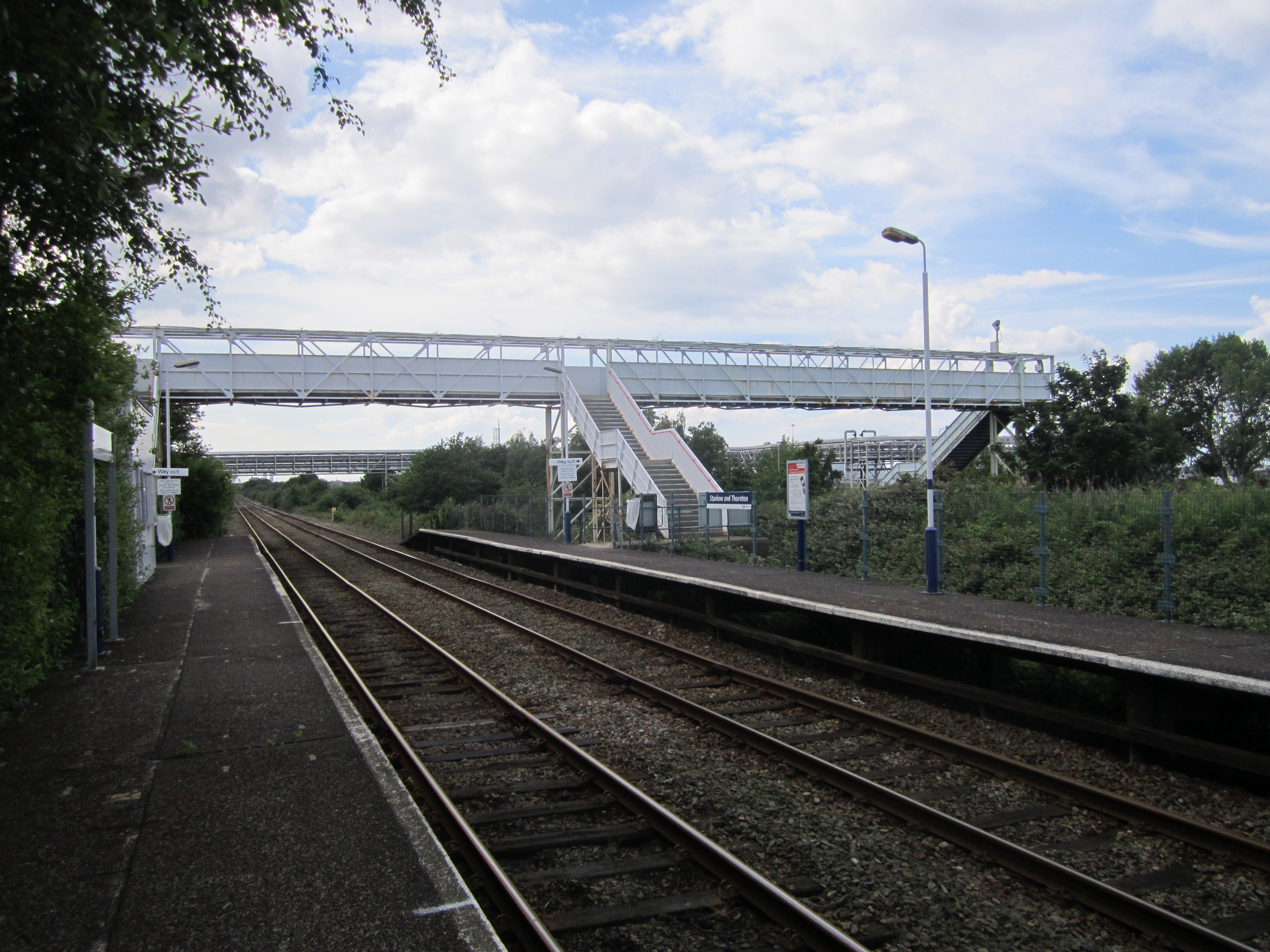
- On the platform

General information
- Location: Stanlow, Cheshire West and Chester; England
- Grid reference: SJ440760
- System: National Rail
- Owner: Network Rail
- Manager: Northern Trains
- Line: Hooton–Helsby
- Platforms: 2

Other information
- Station code: SNT
- Classification: DfT category F2

Key dates
- 23 December 1940: Opened
- 3 February 2022: Services suspended

Passengers
- 2018/19: ▼46
- 2019/20: ▲82
- 2020/21: ▼0
- 2021/22: ▲44
- 2022/23: ▼0
Location
Notes
- Passenger statistics from the Office of Rail and Road

Stanlow and Thornton railway station is located within the Stanlow Refinery in Cheshire, England. It lies on the Hooton–Helsby line between Ellesmere Port and Ince & Elton, 5 miles 67 chains (9.4 km) from Hooton, with services operated by Northern Trains. The station is surrounded by the refinery site, so as a result most station users are refinery employees.

In 2018–19 it was the joint least-used railway station in Britain, and in 2020–2021, the station was also one of the least used stations in Britain, with 0 entries or exits. Services at the station have been suspended due to safety concerns, although the station remains legally open.

== History ==
Stanlow & Thornton track layout in 1975

The station was opened on 23 December 1940, 16 years after the oil refinery opened, jointly by the Great Western Railway and the London, Midland and Scottish Railway.

The signal box was dismantled and donated to the Embsay & Bolton Abbey Steam Railway.

The station was originally earmarked for closure under what is known today as the Beeching Axe, a report created by Dr. Beeching entitled "The Reshaping of British Railways". However, the station remains open today.

Services were suspended indefinitely from 3 February 2022, due to safety concerns of the footbridge which is the only entry point to the station.

== Location ==
The station is located on Oil Sites Road, a private road owned by Essar Oil. This is now closed to motor vehicles, except for access to the site. The original owner, Shell, had cited increased commercial traffic to its refinery and the number of public vehicles using the road, recklessly in some cases, as reasons for closure. Although it is theoretically accessible by foot, it involves a long walk from either Ellesmere Port, Ince or Elton, all of which have their own railway stations. There are no bus or taxi services at this station due to the access restrictions.

== Facilities ==
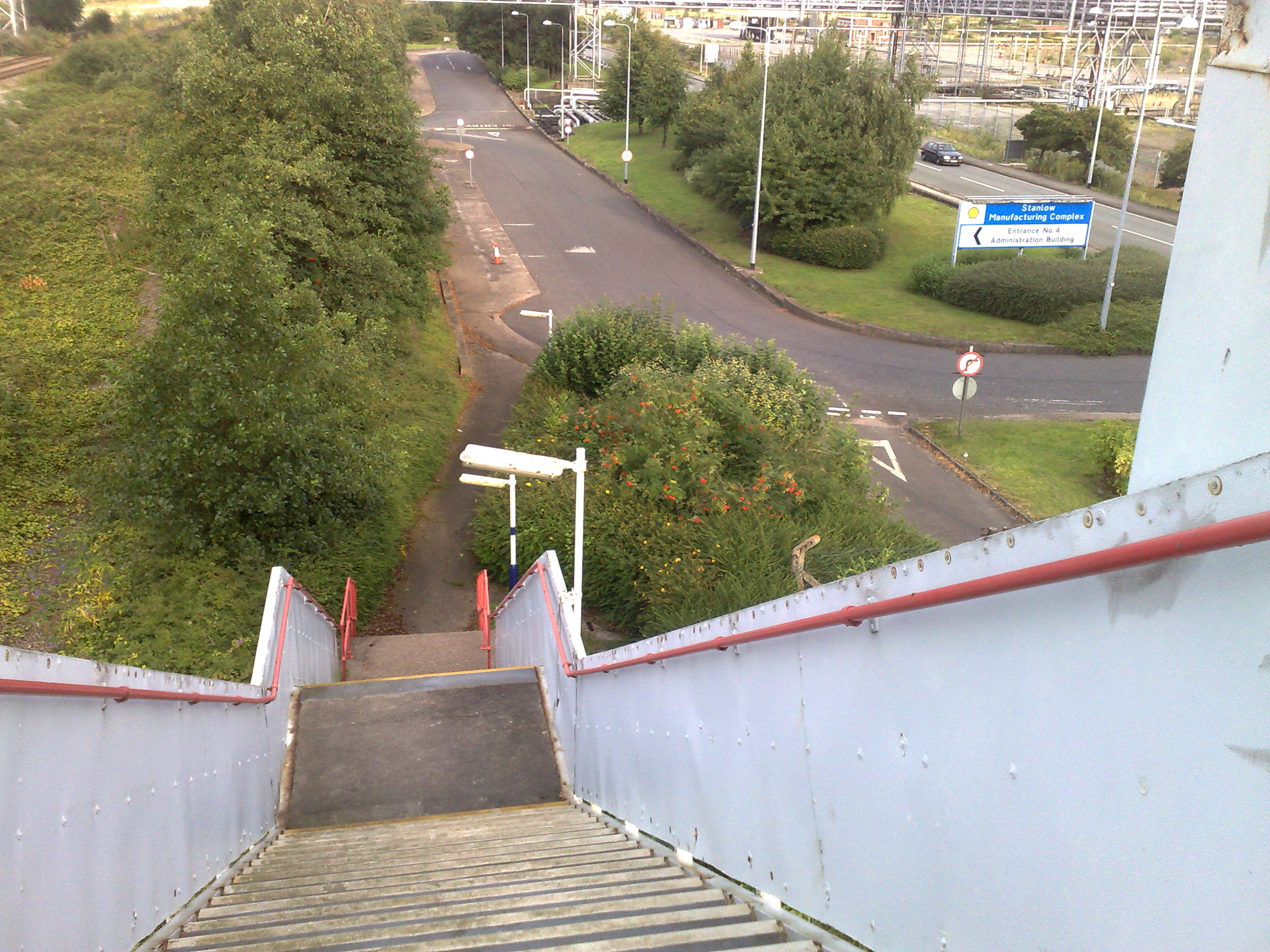
The steps lead down to the refinery site

At this station there are covered shelters, with three metal seats on either platform. There is a payphone located on the Helsby platform.

A footpath leads from the road to a flight of 48 steps with 2 rest landings and a handrail onto a footbridge. From the footbridge to the left, the first flight of 30 steps with rest landing and handrail leads to the Helsby platform, and the second flight of 30 steps with rest landing and handrail leads to the Ellesmere Port platform. The station is therefore not accessible for people with mobility problems. There is limited car parking at the entrance of the station.

The booking office is still extant at the Ellesmere Port platform, but has been closed for some time. Although not controlled by Northern Trains, the station does have CCTV monitored by the Essar oil refinery site security.

The station is now unstaffed with no ticket office so passengers buy tickets from a conductor on board the train.

== Passenger volume ==
Station usage statistics for 2004–05 showed 40 passengers using the station, less than one per week. Passenger numbers began to increase at the station in 2005–06, with 130 people using it in 2005–06. This rose sharply to 326 in 2006–07, despite the same rail services being operated.

In January 2020 the station was named as the joint least used station in Great Britain, alongside Denton Station in Greater Manchester, with just 46 entries and exits in the period 1 April 2018 to 31 March 2019. Passengers increased to 82 the following year, but Stanlow and Thornton remained one of only six British stations to serve fewer than 100 annual passengers.

Passenger volume at Stanlow & Thornton
	2004–05	2005–06	2006–07	2007–08	2008–09	2009–10	2010–11	2011–12	2012–13	2013–14	2014–15	2015–16	2016–17	2017–18	2018–19	2019–20	2020–21	2021–22
Entries and exits	40	130	326	278	480	490	342	468	260	314	158	88	128	92	46	82	0	44

The statistics cover twelve month periods that start in April.

== Services ==
No trains currently call at this station due to it being closed because of safety concerns. It used to receive 4 trains a day on weekdays and Saturdays; two return journeys between Helsby and Ellesmere Port. There is no estimate as to when services may resume.

Preceding station	National Rail	Following station
Ellesmere Port	Northern Trains Ellesmere Port to Helsby Line (service suspended)	Ince & Elton

== Community rail ==
The North Cheshire Community Rail partnership and the North Cheshire Rail Users Group support and actively campaign for an improved service at this station and for this railway line.

== Bibliography ==
- Butt, R. V. J. (October 1995). The Directory of Railway Stations: details every public and private passenger station, halt, platform and stopping place, past and present (1st ed.). Sparkford: Patrick Stephens Ltd. ISBN 978-1-85260-508-7. OCLC 60251199. OL 11956311M.
- Mitchell, Vic; Smith, Keith (2012). Chester to Birkenhead. Middleton Press. figs. 104-108. ISBN 9781908174215. OCLC 811323335.
- Quick, Michael (2023). Railway Passenger Stations in Great Britain: A Chronology (PDF) (5th ed.). London: Railway and Canal Historical Society.
