= Runcorn railway station =

Railway station in Cheshire, England

Coordinates: 53.339°N 2.739°W

Runcorn
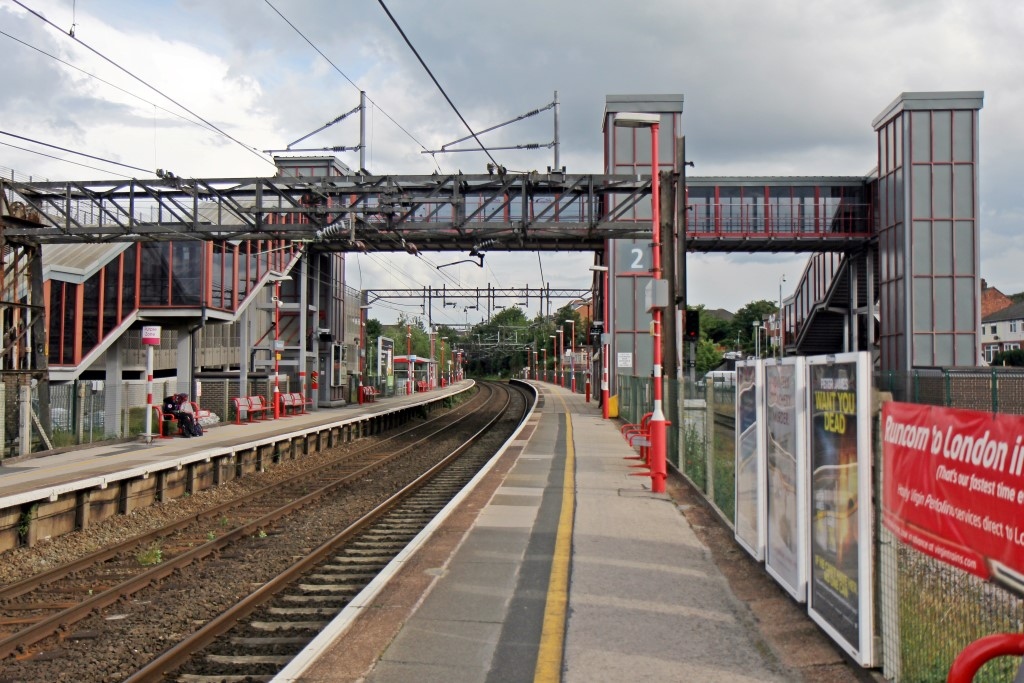

General information
- Location: Runcorn, Borough of Halton; England
- Grid reference: SJ508826
- Managed by: Avanti West Coast
- Platforms: 2

Other information
- Station code: RUN
- Classification: DfT category C1

History
- Original company: London and North Western Railway
- Pre-grouping: London and North Western Railway
- Post-grouping: London, Midland and Scottish Railway

Key dates
- 1 April 1869: Station opened

Passengers
- 2020/21: ▼0.143 million
- Interchange: 5,289
- 2021/22: ▲0.486 million
- Interchange: ▲17,894
- 2022/23: ▲0.521 million
- Interchange: ▲35,155
- 2023/24: ▲0.625 million
- Interchange: ▲40,081
- 2024/25: ▲0.732 million
- Interchange: ▲53,679
Location
Notes
- Passenger statistics from the Office of Rail and Road

Runcorn railway station is in the industrial town of Runcorn in Cheshire, north-west England. The station lies on the Liverpool branch of the West Coast Main Line/Crewe-Liverpool Lime Street line via Runcorn and Liverpool South Parkway between Acton Bridge/Crewe and Liverpool South Parkway and is managed by Avanti West Coast. There are regular services to Liverpool Lime Street, Crewe, London Euston, Birmingham New Street and Chester.

== History ==
The station is located a short distance south of the Runcorn Railway Bridge over the River Mersey on a section of line opened by the London and North Western Railway to create a more direct route between Liverpool and Crewe. The station opened on 1 April 1869.

== Facilities ==
The station has a shop and snack bar in the ticket hall. Lifts are available (integrated into the footbridge) to allow passengers to cross between the platforms. A car park (charges apply) and taxi rank are also available, and bus stops for services to other parts of Runcorn and also to Widnes.

There are customer help points, digital information screens and automated train announcements available to give train running information.

The station normally has a staffed ticket office and self-service ticket vending machines are available, allowing passengers to purchase tickets or collect pre-booked tickets (e.g. through a train operator's website or telesales centre).

== Services ==
Avanti West Coast - (2 per hour)

There is a half hourly service between Liverpool Lime Street and London Euston operated by Avanti West Coast.

West Midlands Trains - (2 per hour)

There is a half hourly service between Liverpool, Crewe and Birmingham New Street operated by West Midlands Trains under the London Northwestern brand.

Transport for Wales - (1 train per hour)

Transport for Wales also runs an hourly service between Liverpool Lime Street and Chester using the Halton Curve.

Services are less frequent in the evenings and on Sundays.

Preceding station	National Rail	Following station
Liverpool South Parkway towards Liverpool Lime Street	London Northwestern Railway Birmingham–Liverpool	Acton Bridge towards Birmingham New Street
Liverpool Lime Street or Liverpool South Parkway	Avanti West Coast; WCML Liverpool Branch	Hartford or Crewe or Stafford or Lichfield Trent Valley or London Euston
Liverpool South Parkway	Transport for Wales; Halton Curve	Frodsham

== See also ==
- Runcorn signal box
- Runcorn East railway station
