= Hooton–Helsby line =

Railway line in England

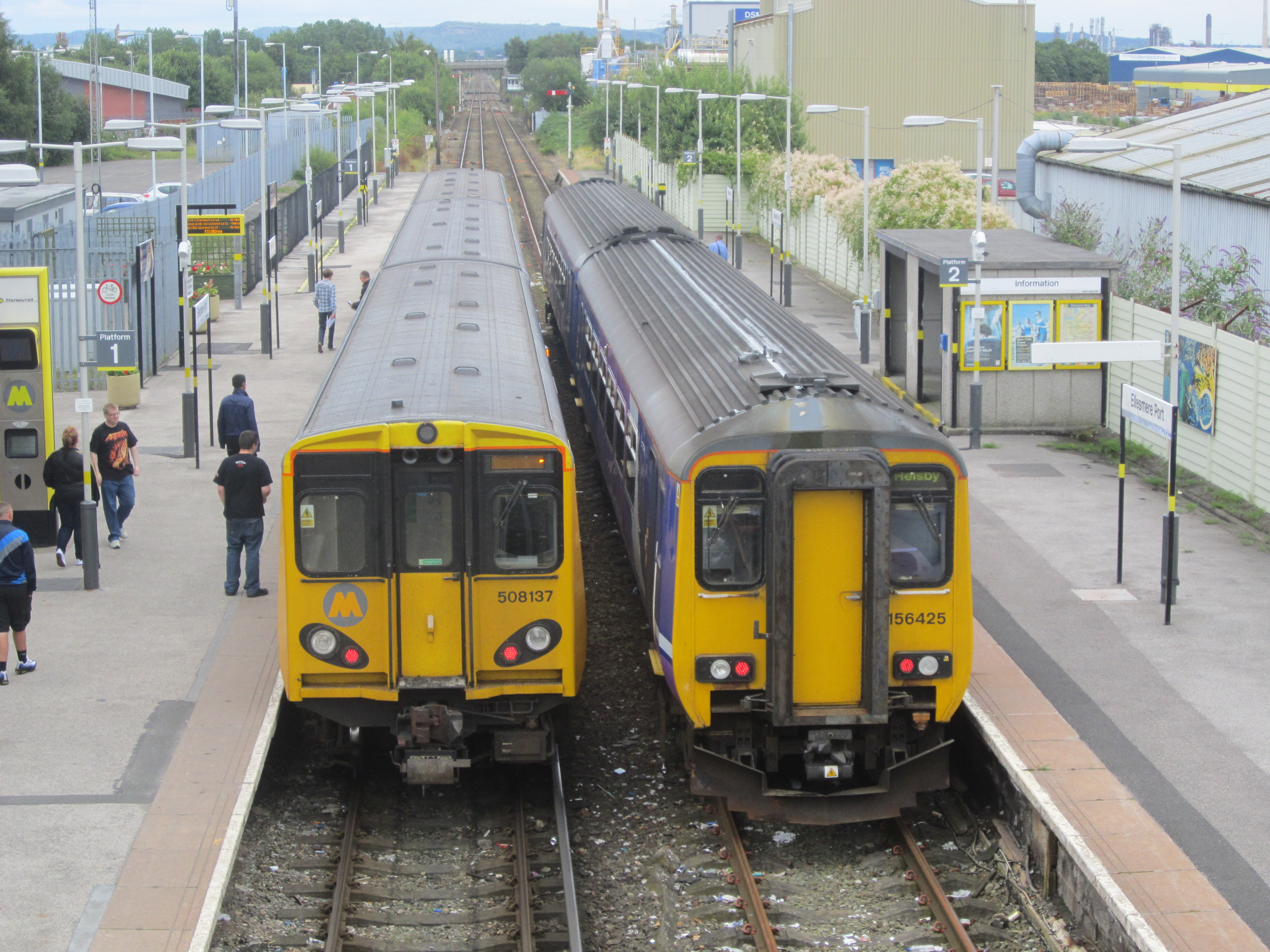
- Wirral Line train (left) and train to Helsby (right) at Ellesmere Port.

Overview
- Status: Operational
- Owner: Network Rail
- ELR: HHJ
- Locale: Cheshire; North West England
- Termini: Hooton; Helsby
- Stations: 5

Service
- System: National Rail
- Services: Wirral Line; Ellesmere Port–Helsby(–Warrington)
- Operator(s): Merseyrail; Northern Trains
- Depot(s): Allerton TMD; Birkenhead North TMD
- Rolling stock: Class 777; Class 150

History
- Opened: 1863

Technical
- Track gauge: 1,435 mm (4 ft 8 1/2 in) standard gauge
- Operating speed: 60 mph (95 km/h) (except Hooton and Helsby)
Route map
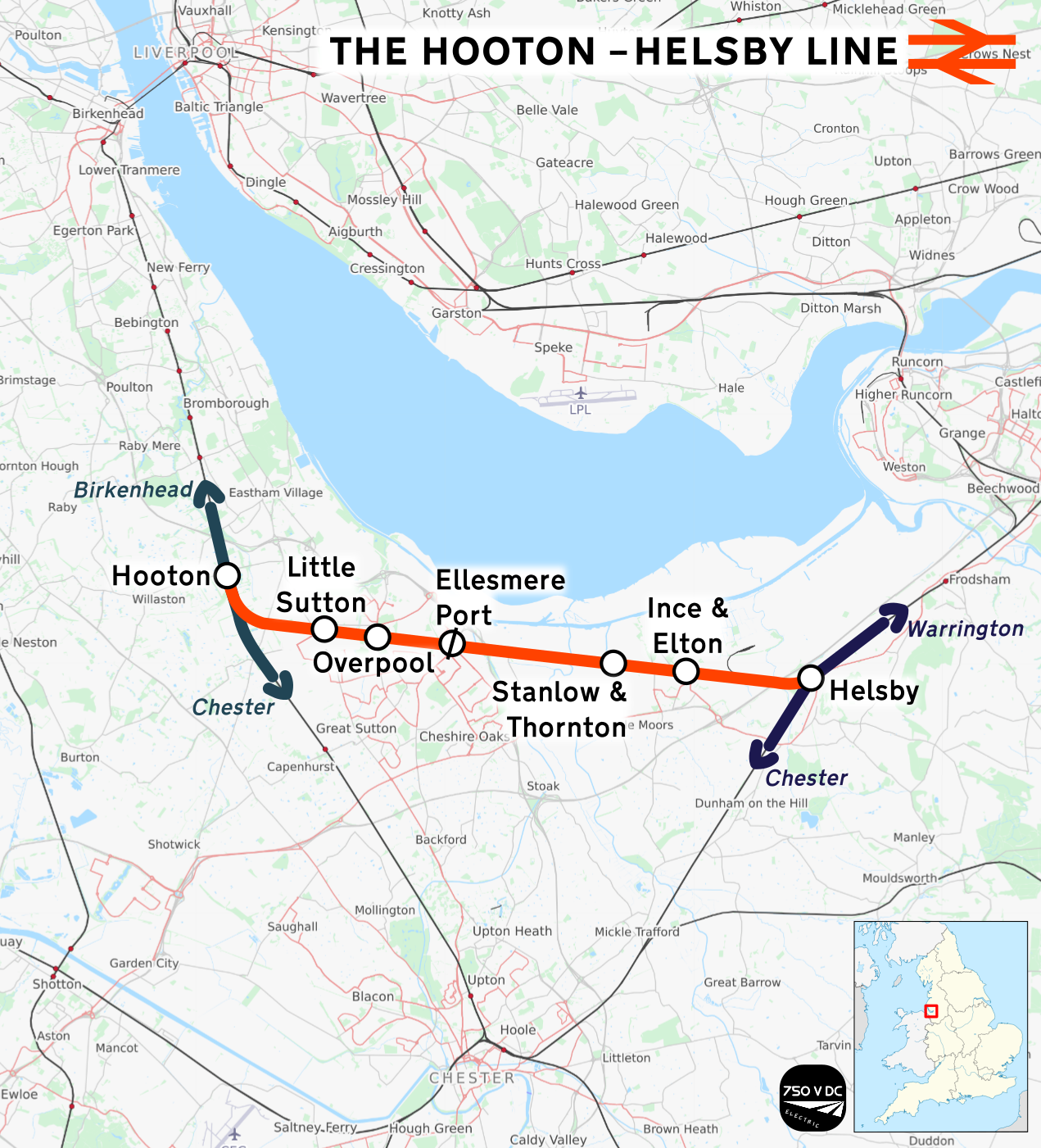
(Click to expand)

The Hooton–Helsby line is a railway line in the north-west of England that runs from Hooton on the Chester–Birkenhead line to the village and junction station at Helsby where it joins the Chester–Warrington line.

== History ==
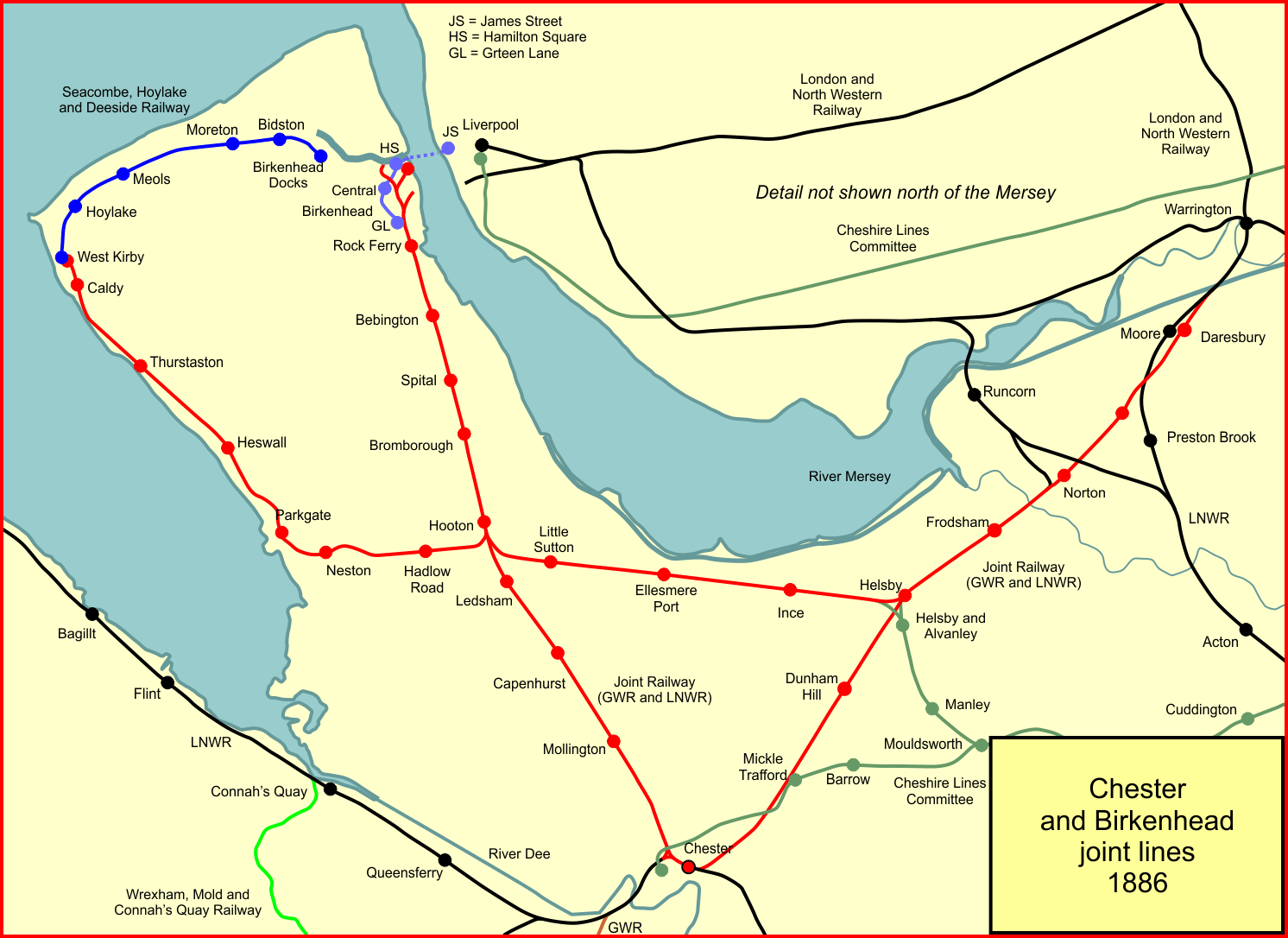
Hooton–Helsby line and surrounding lines in 1886

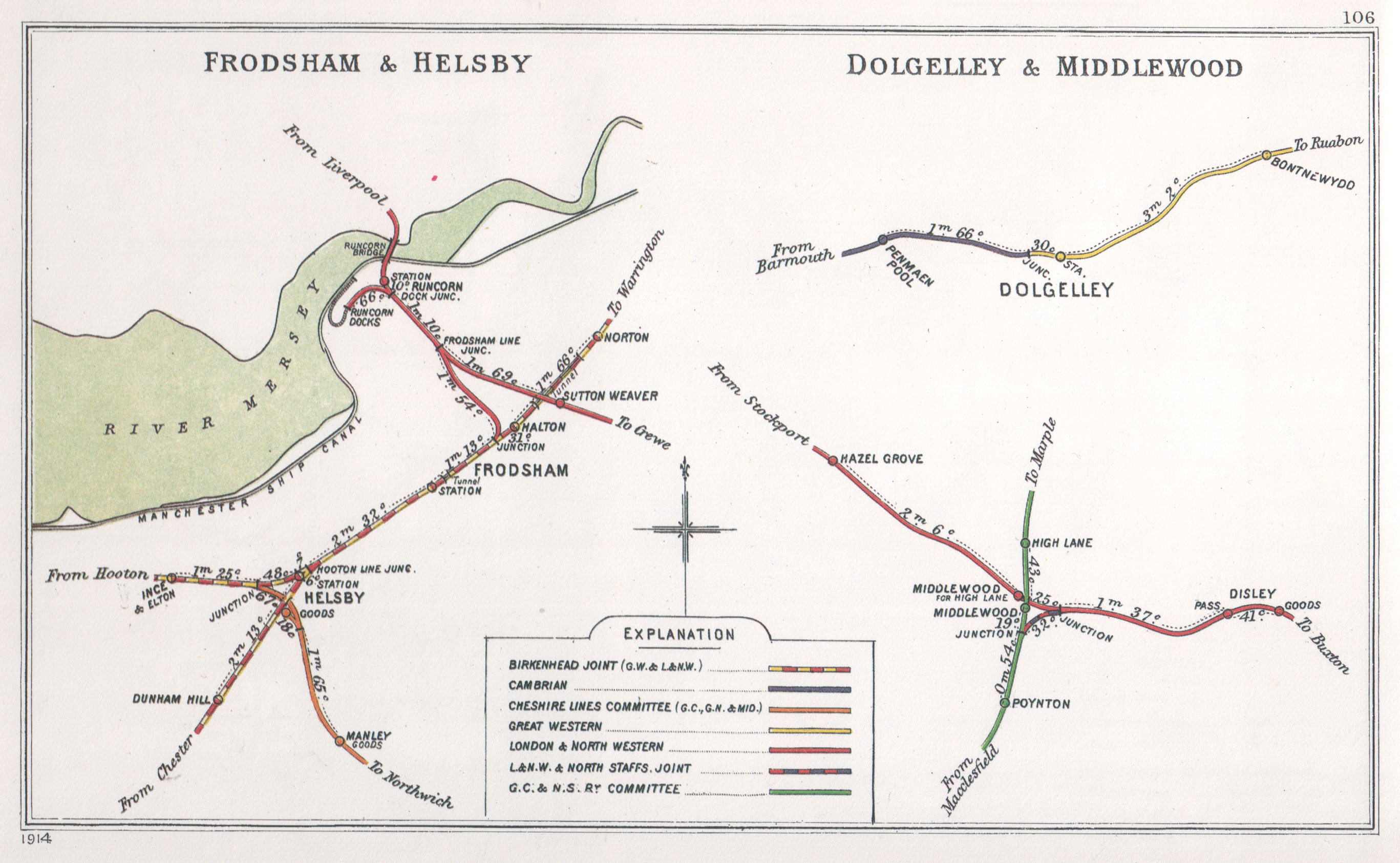
Helsby station on a 1914 Railway Clearing House map

The line from Hooton to Helsby was opened in 1863. The line was built by the Birkenhead Railway which had been taken over by the LNWR and the Great Western Railway (GWR) jointly in 1860.

The section west of Ellesmere Port has been part of the Merseyrail network since 1994. This part of the line is electrified. There are no longer through train services to Liverpool's city centre via Birkenhead.

A branch at Helsby connected the line to the former West Cheshire Railway to Northwich via Mouldsworth Junction. The line closed in 1991 and tracks were lifted in 1995.

== Passenger services ==
=== Former services ===
Services previously used to operate from Hooton to Helsby. This service was relatively frequent (every half-hour until 1993), operating via Ellesmere Port. It was withdrawn after the line was electrified west of Ellesmere Port. Station signs at Ince and Elton railway station still display signage relating to services to/from Hooton.

=== Hooton–Ellesmere Port ===
Services are operated by Merseyrail as part of the Wirral Line network with trains running every 30 minutes. From Hooton services continue to Liverpool via the Chester–Birkenhead line.

=== Ellesmere Port–Helsby ===
Northern did, until May 2019, operate a Department for Transport-set minimum service of three trains daily in each direction between Ellesmere Port and Helsby, Cheshire.

There were 6 passenger services each day (except Sunday):

05:10 Liverpool Lime Street to Ellesmere Port
06:33 Helsby to Ellesmere Port
18:50 Helsby to Ellesmere Port

06:19 Ellesmere Port to Helsby
06:53 Ellesmere Port to Warrington Bank Quay
19:10 Ellesmere Port to Manchester Victoria

In previous years, services have operated towards Hooton via Ellesmere Port and Liverpool Lime Street via Warrington Bank Quay.

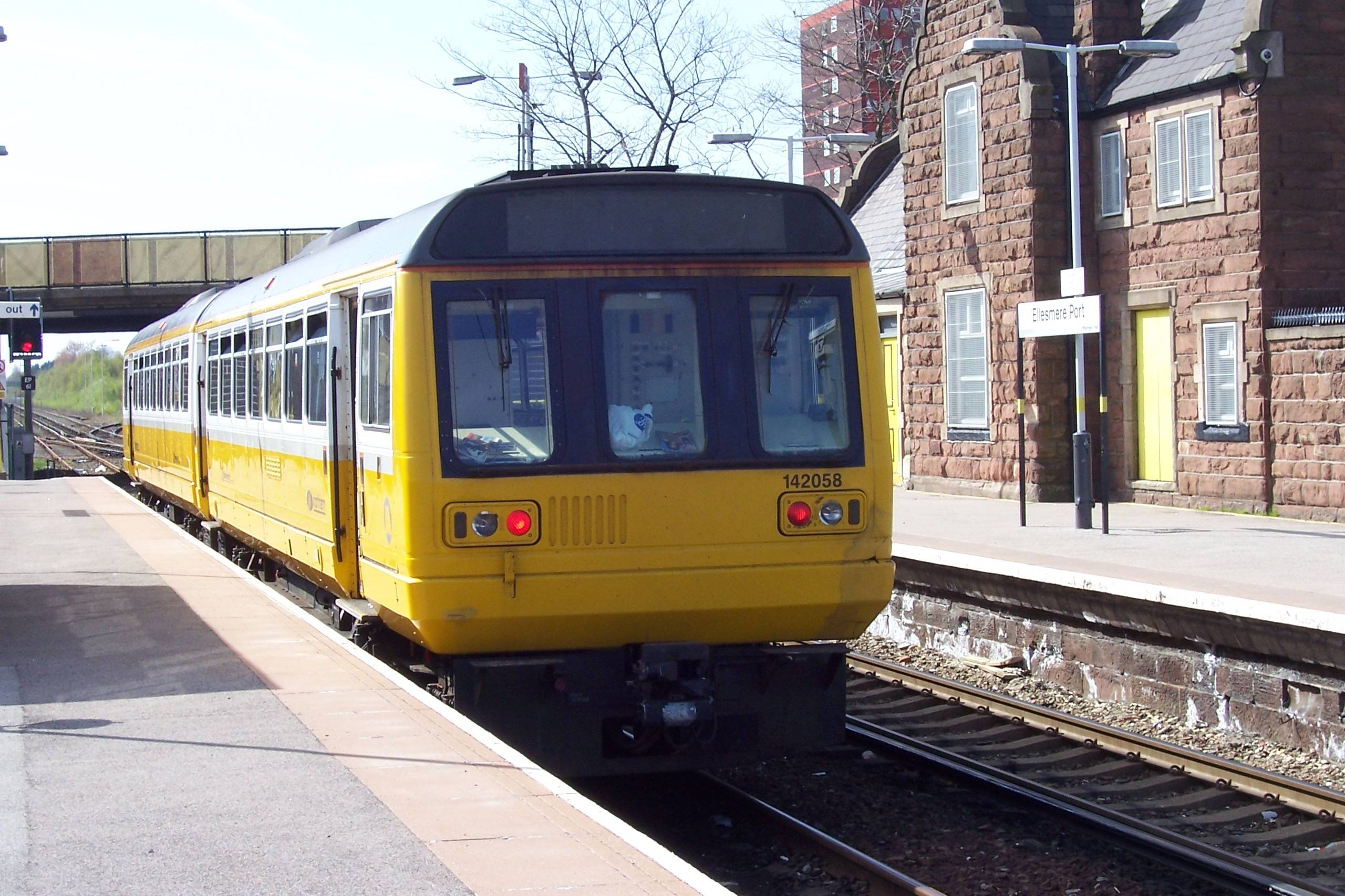
A Class 142 Pacer train terminates at Ellesmere Port from Helsby.

As of June 2026, two trains per day operate:

06:00 Helsby - Ellesmere Port 18:50 Helsby - Ellesmere Port

06:30 Ellesmere Port - Helsby 19:06 Ellesmere Port - Liverpool Lime Street

== Freight services ==
Ellesmere Port saw frequent freight traffic until 1996 with branches to several wharves as well as Eastham Oil Terminal. In 2005 a single track line to Manisty Wharf in Ellesmere Port was reopened for a regular coal flow to Fiddlers Ferry power station. This freight route enters Ellesmere Port from Helsby. Freightliner Heavy Haul currently operates the service, with two trains per day.

In 2008 Quinn Glass was planning expansion and wanted to serve their 205 acres (0.83 km^{2}; 0.320 sq mi) site at Elton which outputs 1.2 billion glass containers per year for the food and beverage industry near the Ince & Elton railway station by rail. Network Rail Route Strategy states that Quinn Glass is interested in additional passenger and freight services on this line. It is also thought that planning permission requires Quinn Glass to maximise upon existing public transport links. A trial service ran on 7 April 2011 and a twice-weekly service every Wednesday and Friday commenced on 13 April 2011. Those services were operated by Freightliner Heavy Haul and transported sand from Sibelco's Middleton Towers Quarry in Middleton, Norfolk.

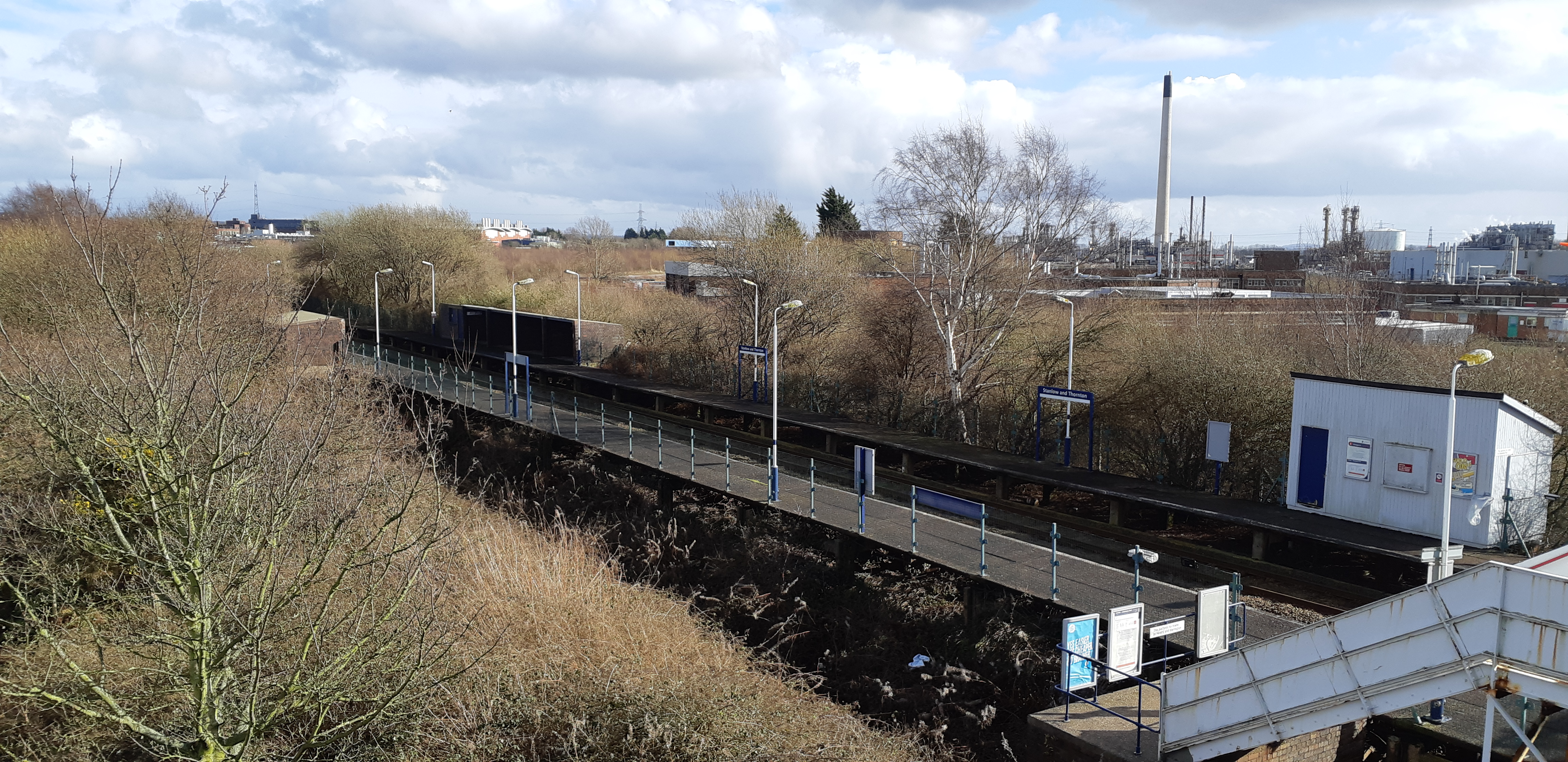
Stanlow and Thornton, one of the intermediate stops on the line

At present the sand is transported by road the final five miles to the Quinn Glass plant from a former Cawoods siding in Ellesmere Port beside the Manchester Ship Canal, south of Manisty Wharf, but from November 2011 trains were due to begin using a dedicated terminal at the plant itself. It was announced during this month that construction work had been delayed due to the discovery of a badger sett on the proposed site. Completion of the new line was set back to the end of June 2012 with a reported total cost of more than £2 million. In November 2012 it emerged that Quinn Glass had broken a planning condition requiring the rail terminal to be operational by November 2011. The company cited additional demands by Network Rail and the Environment Agency's decision to switch off the Frodsham Marshes pumping stations as causes of delay. Quinn Glass have since been granted an extended period by Cheshire West and Chester council during which to complete the project.

== Stations ==
- Hooton; opened October or November 1840; still open;
- Sutton; opened 1 July 1863; renamed Little Sutton 1886; still open;
- Overpool; opened 15 August 1988; still open;
- Whitby Locks; opened 1 July 1863; renamed Ellesmere Port 1870; still open;
- Stanlow & Thornton; opened 23 December 1940 for refinery workers; opened to public 24 February 1941; (service suspended since 3 February 2022)
- Ince; opened 1 July 1863; renamed Ince and Elton 1884; still open;
- West Cheshire Junction; divergence of line to Mouldsworth;
- Helsby; opened September 1852; still open;

Three of the four stations between Helsby and Ellesmere Port are unstaffed. Two of them, Ellesmere Port and Ince and Elton, are accessible for those in wheelchairs. Stanlow and Thornton and Helsby both have footbridges as their only means of exit. Facilities at Ince and Elton and Stanlow and Thornton are basic, comprising little more than covered waiting areas and timetable information. Ellesmere Port has full ticket-selling capabilities, including a Ticket Vending Machine and a staffed ticket office, along with real-time information displays and help points. Helsby has real-time information displays and a Ticket Vending Machine.
