= Norton railway station (Cheshire) =

Former railway station in England

Norton (Cheshire)
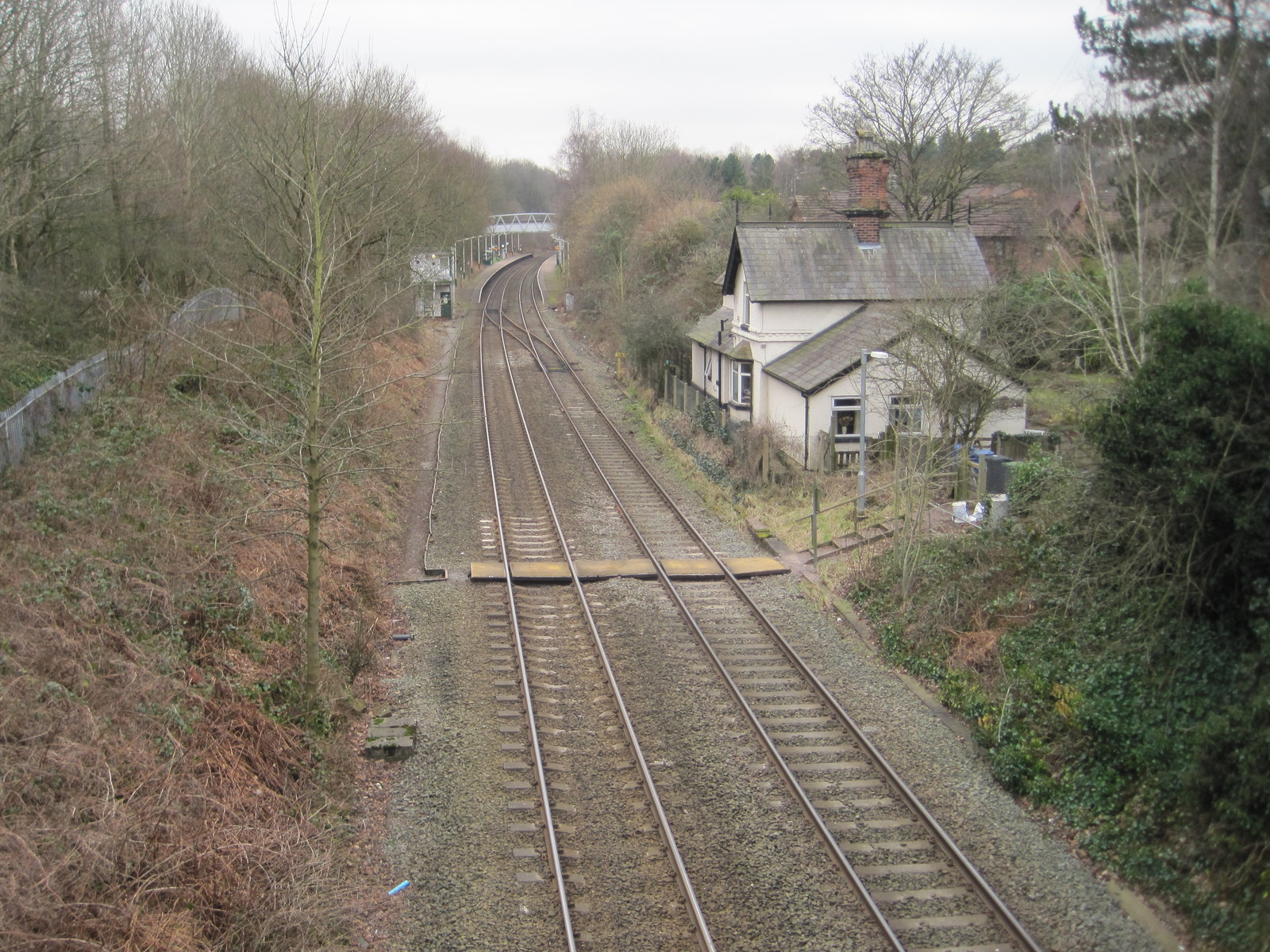
- Site of the former station (2015)

General information
- Location: Halton; England
- Coordinates: 53.3295°N 2.6638°W
- Grid reference: SJ559815
- Platforms: 2

Other information
- Status: Disused

History
- Original company: Birkenhead, Lancashire and Cheshire Junction Railway
- Pre-grouping: Birkenhead Joint Railway
- Post-grouping: Birkenhead Joint Railway

Key dates
- 18 December 1850: Opened as Norton
- 1926: Renamed Norton (Cheshire)
- 1 September 1952: Closed
Location

Norton railway station was located near Norton, a village to the east of Runcorn, Cheshire, England. It was located just north of the 1.25 mile (2 km) Sutton Tunnel and was built as a result of the recommendations of a Board of Trade enquiry into a fatal accident in the tunnel the previous year.

It was opened by the Birkenhead, Lancashire & Cheshire Joint Railway company on 18 December 1850; originally named Norton, it was renamed Norton (Cheshire) in 1926; and it was closed to passenger traffic by the British Transport Commission on 1 September 1952. Most of the station has since been demolished, but the old station house remains in use as a private dwelling and there is a signal box nearby that still bears this name. A new station, known as Runcorn East was opened a few metres south of the original site in October 1983 to serve the southern end of Runcorn new town.

Preceding station	Historical railways	Following station
Halton	Birkenhead Joint Railway	Daresbury
