= Helsby railway station =

Railway station in Cheshire, England

Coordinates: 53.275°N 2.771°W

Helsby
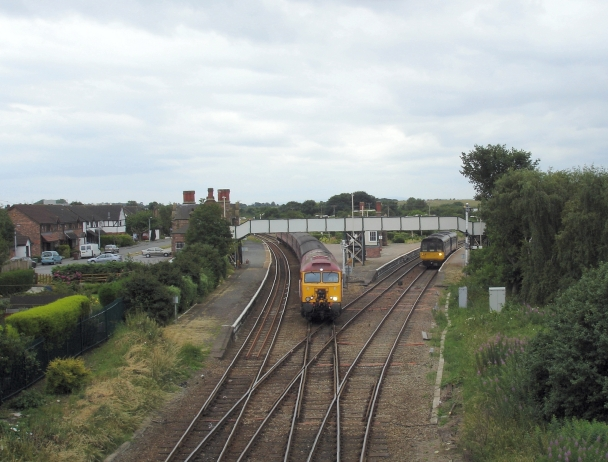

General information
- Location: Helsby, Cheshire West and Chester; England
- Grid reference: SJ486756
- Manager: Transport for Wales
- Lines: Chester–Warrington line; Hooton–Helsby line
- Platforms: 4

Other information
- Station code: HSB
- Classification: DfT category F1

History
- Original company: Birkenhead, Lancashire and Cheshire Junction Railway
- Pre-grouping: Birkenhead Railway
- Post-grouping: Birkenhead Railway

Key dates
- 1852: Station opened

Passengers
- 2020/21: ▼25,184
- Interchange: 3,276
- 2021/22: ▲73,106
- Interchange: ▲12,679
- 2022/23: ▲89,258
- Interchange: ▲55,321
- 2023/24: ▲98,362
- Interchange: ▲61,861
- 2024/25: ▲123,710
- Interchange: ▲85,005
Location
Notes
- Passenger statistics from the Office of Rail and Road

Helsby railway station serves the village of Helsby in Cheshire, England. It is recorded in the National Heritage List for England as a Grade II listed building.

The station is on the Chester–Warrington line between Chester and Warrington Bank Quay and on the Hooton–Helsby line to Hooton.

== Facilities ==
There is a BT Payphone on Platform 1. Limited seating exists on Platform 1 and 2.

The station has won numerous Best Kept Station awards. A Customer Information System has been installed and is operational.

There is no disabled access to trains calling at this station due to the low platforms. Platforms for the Manchester and Ellesmere Port services can also only be reached by using the footbridge.

The station is operated by Transport for Wales and is unstaffed requiring passengers to purchase tickets from the ticket vending machine located on Platform 1. The nearest station with additional ticketing facilities is Chester. Penalty fares do not operate here.

From 2005 until the franchise was handed over in 2018 the Helsby station was operated by Arriva Trains Wales.

== Services ==
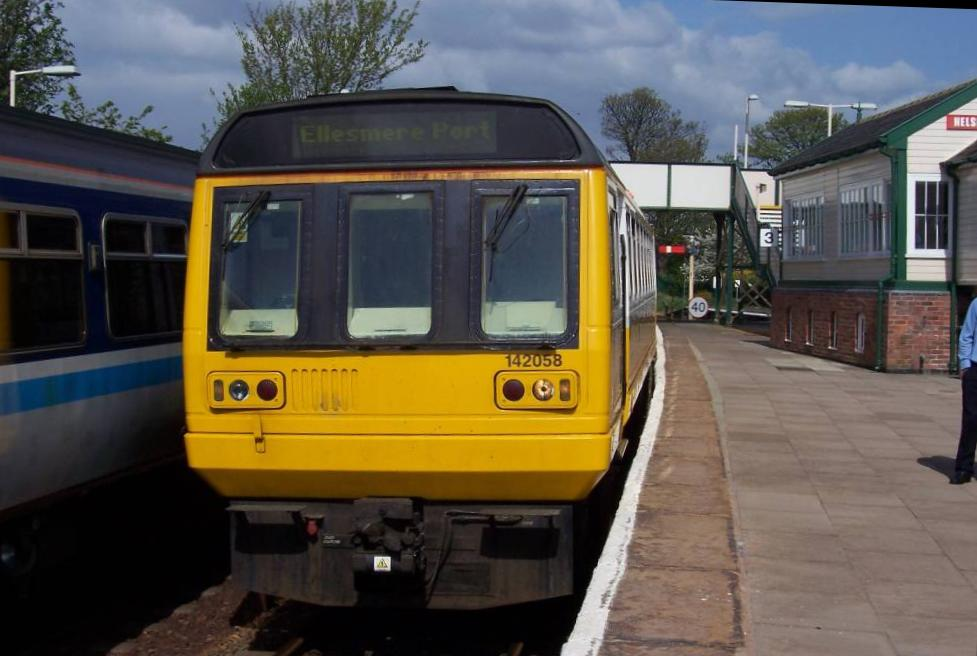
Ellesmere Port branch trains stand at platform 3 and 4

Most services at Helsby are operated by Transport for Wales, with a limited service operated by Northern Trains.

Transport for Wales generally operate an hourly service between Manchester Airport and Chester, with most services continuing to and from Llandudno via Shotton, as well as an hourly service between Liverpool Lime Street and Chester. These services combine to give an off-peak service of two trains per hour in each direction.

The station is also served by a limited peak hour Northern Trains service between Chester and Leeds with four trains per day to Chester and three trains per day to Leeds via Manchester Victoria. Northern Trains also operate two trains per day on weekdays and Saturdays only to and from Ellesmere Port that start and terminate at Helsby, with the exception of one afternoon service that continues to Liverpool Lime Street.

Preceding station	National Rail	Following station
Chester	Transport for Wales Chester–Warrington line	Frodsham
Chester	Transport for Wales Halton Curve	Frodsham
Chester	Northern Trains Chester to Leeds Peak Hours only	Frodsham
Ince & Elton	Northern Trains Ellesmere Port to Helsby Line Monday-Saturday only	Runcorn East
	Historical railways	
Dunham Hill	Birkenhead Joint Railway	Frodsham

== Adopt-a-station ==
The North Cheshire Rail Users' Group has adopted this station and regularly ensure the station is clean and tidy. The station has won the "Best Kept Station" six times, and the plaques commending this are fixed to the signal box located on the island platforms, (2 + 3).

== Connections ==
Helsby has several bus links operated primarily by Arriva North West and Stagecoach Merseyside.

- Route X30 operates between Chester and Warrington hourly. (Arriva NW) (Monday - Saturday)
- Route X2 operates between Runcorn and Chester via Ince & Elton, and Ellesmere Port, hourly. (Stagecoach Merseyside) (Monday - Saturday)

== See also ==
- Listed buildings in Helsby
