= Ince & Elton railway station =

Railway station in Cheshire, England

Coordinates: 53.277°N 2.816°W

Ince & Elton
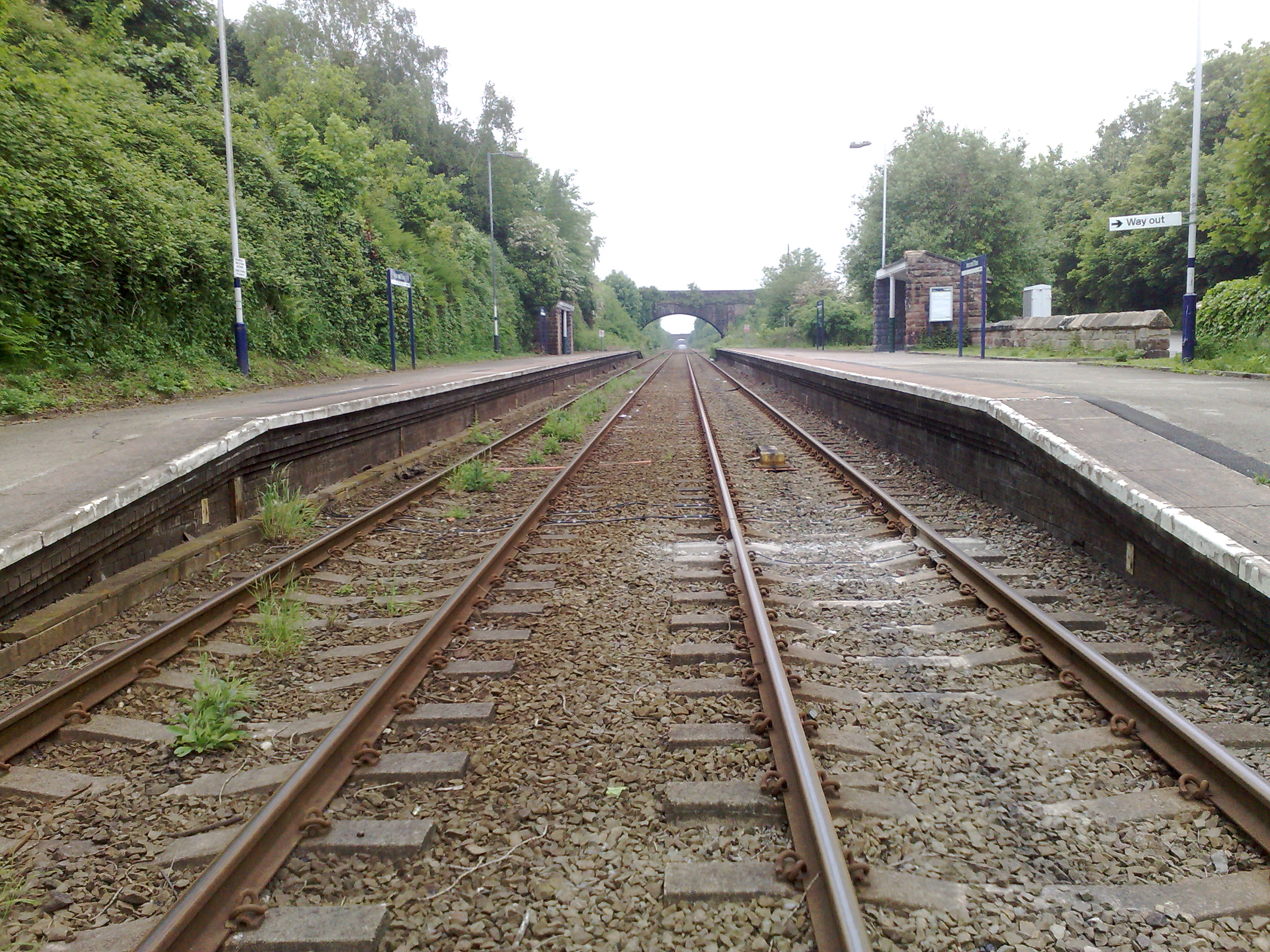

General information
- Location: Elton, Cheshire West and Chester; England
- Grid reference: SJ456758
- Manager: Northern Trains
- Line: Hooton–Helsby
- Platforms: 2

Other information
- Station code: INE
- Classification: DfT category F2

Key dates
- 1 July 1863: opened as Ince
- 17 April 1884: Renamed Ince & Elton

Passengers
- 2021/22: ▲202
- 2022/23: ▼130
- 2023/24: ▼86
- 2024/25: ▲98
- 2025/26: ▲216
Location
Notes
- Passenger statistics from the Office of Rail and Road

Ince & Elton railway station, on the Hooton–Helsby line, serves both Ince and Elton in Cheshire, England. The station is unstaffed.

== History ==
Ince station was opened on 1 July 1863 by the Birkenhead Joint Railway. It was renamed Ince & Elton on 17 April 1884. Services were operated jointly by the London and North Western Railway and Great Western Railway up until the 1923 Grouping, then by the GWR and the London, Midland and Scottish Railway. After nationalisation in 1948, the station became part of the London Midland region of British Railways. The route through the station carried significant amounts of freight from the outset, from the docks at Birkenhead and later from the oil refineries and dock complex at Ellesmere Port as well as a local passenger service between Birkenhead Monks Ferry (from opening until March 1878)/Birkenhead Woodside (from April 1878) or Hooton and Helsby, where passenger could access the other section of the joint line between Warrington Bank Quay and Chester.

This station was earmarked for closure, along with Stanlow and Thornton, Helsby and Ellesmere Port, under the proposals made by Dr. Beeching. This was never implemented, although services gradually began to reduce and the remaining through trains to/from Birkenhead Woodside ended in 1967 when the station there was closed.

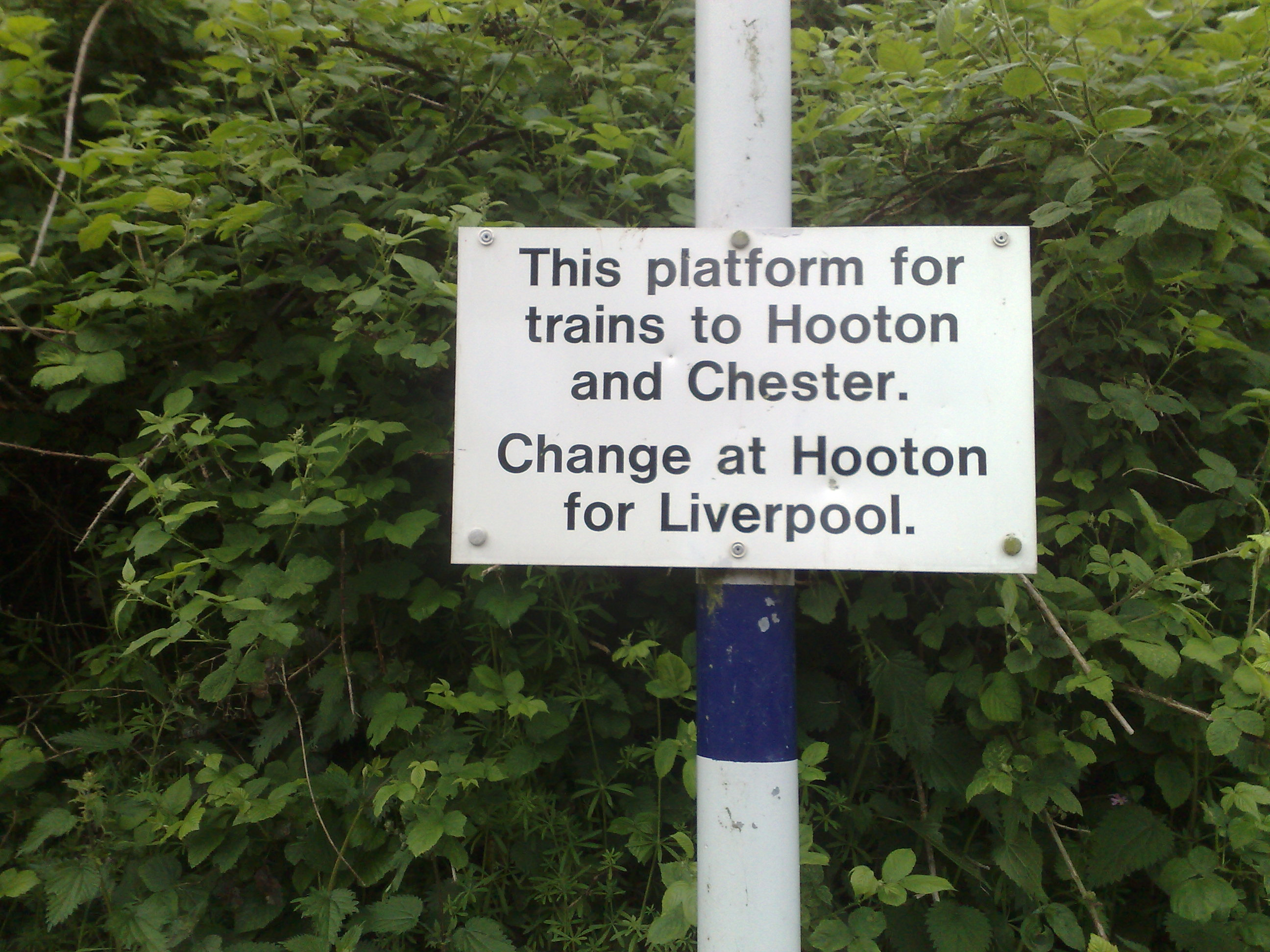
Ince & Elton station Sign, Platform 2

Services originally operated regularly between Helsby and Hooton via Ellesmere Port, with some services running through to Rock Ferry prior to the electrification of the line between there and Hooton in 1985. Once electric trains began running to Hooton, the service was revamped to run between Chester and Helsby via Hooton (with a reversal there) every 30 minutes on weekdays & Saturdays. Convenient connections were available at Helsby for Warrington & Manchester and at Hooton for Liverpool. However, following the extension of the third rail southwards to Chester in 1993, the service east of Ellesmere Port was cut back substantially – most trains ran as a shuttle to Ellesmere Port only, with only a two-hourly service beyond there. The pattern was then altered again when electrification of the Hooton to Ellesmere Port section was completed in 1994 – from that point onwards, all services from Helsby terminated at Ellesmere Port but ran beyond Helsby to Warrington Bank Quay and Liverpool Lime Street (every two hours Mon–Sat), calling at all stations en route. The new service was poorly patronised though, and by 1996 it had been cut back to the current pattern of two pairs of services each way in the early morning and mid afternoon. It was the worst performing English station for cancellations in the four weeks to 1 February 2025, according to data from the Office of Rail and Road (ORR), with 22.8% of trains cancelled.

Some station signs are outdated, displaying information about those former services to Chester and Hooton (see image of sign on Platform 2).

== Facilities ==
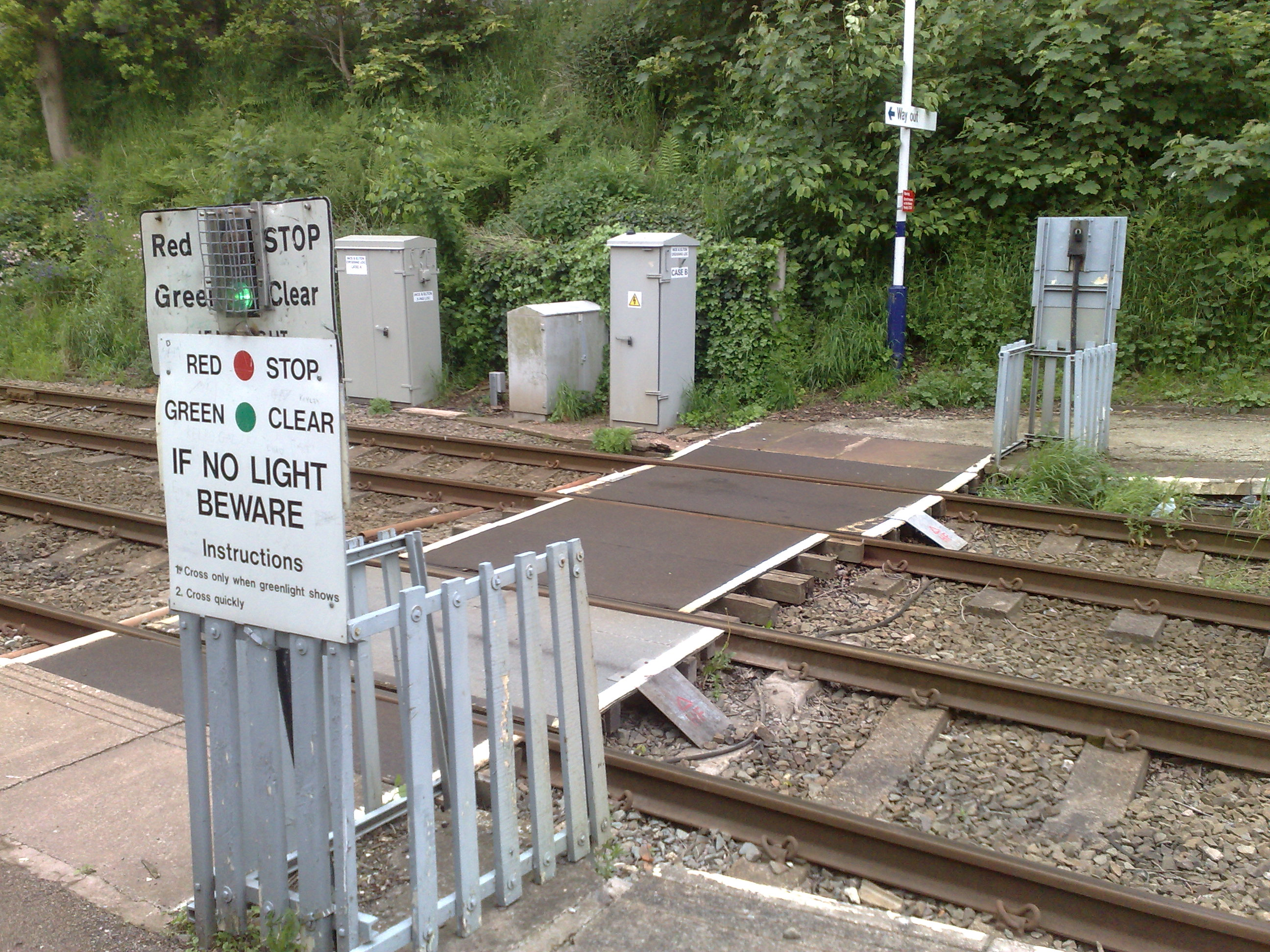
The level crossing at Ince & Elton Station

There is level access from the small car park at the front of station onto the Helsby platform. From this platform, to reach the Ellesmere Port platform, turn left, go down the platform end ramp, and providing the level crossing warning lights indicate that it is safe, cross the lines using the foot crossing and then up the platform end ramp. There is no waiting room, but there are shelters and seating on the platforms.

The road leading down from the main road at Ince to the station is step-free, although there is no pavement. The alternative exit, via the narrow path involves walking up steep steps, which is not accessible for passengers with pushchairs and/or mobility problems.

Northern Trains's Adopt-a-Station scheme is in operation at this station. Members of the local community support the station by carrying out regular duties such as picking up litter and ensuring the station remains in a good overall condition.

== Services ==
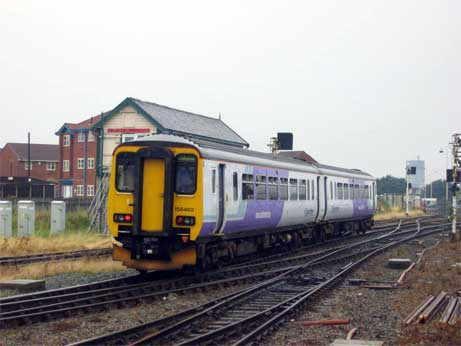
Northern Rail Class 156.

All services at Ince & Elton are operated by Northern Trains.

The station is served by a limited parliamentary service of two trains per day in each direction on weekdays and Saturdays only between Ellesmere Port and Helsby. One eastbound train per day continues beyond Helsby to Liverpool Lime Street. There is no service on Sundays although a normal service operates on most Bank Holidays.

A rail user group, the North Cheshire Rail User Group, supports and campaigns for improved services at the station and on the line.

Preceding station	National Rail	Following station
Stanlow and Thornton (service suspended)	Northern Trains Ellesmere Port to Helsby Line Monday-Saturday only	Helsby
Ellesmere Port	Northern Trains Ellesmere Port to Helsby Line Monday-Saturday only	Helsby
