= Halton railway station (Cheshire) =

Former railway station in England

Halton
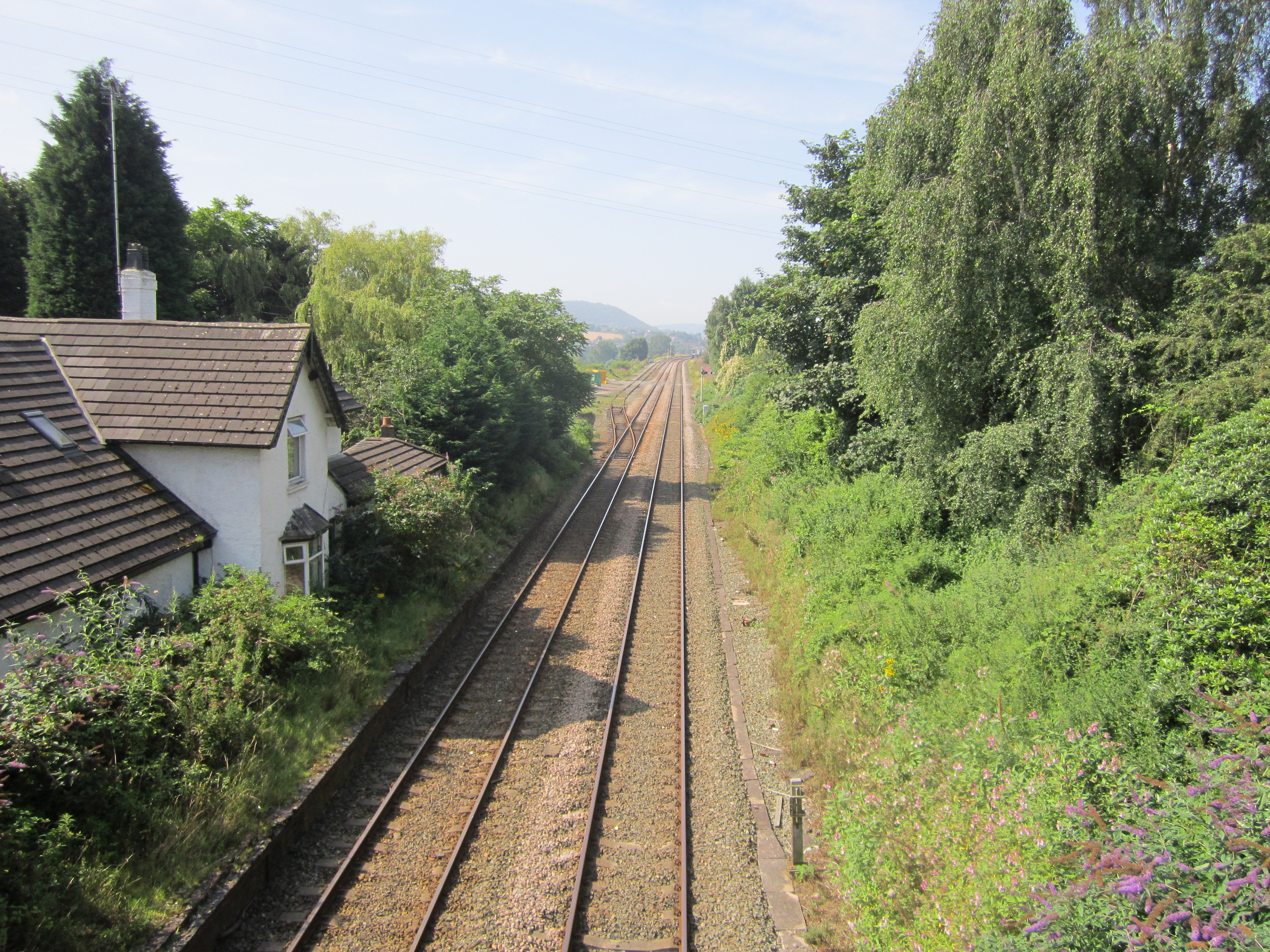
- The site of the station in 2012

General information
- Location: Sutton Weaver, Halton; England
- Coordinates: 53.3102°N 2.6940°W
- Grid reference: SJ538794
- Platforms: 2

Other information
- Status: Disused

History
- Original company: Birkenhead, Lancashire and Cheshire Junction Railway
- Pre-grouping: Birkenhead Joint Railway
- Post-grouping: Birkenhead Joint Railway

Key dates
- August 1851: Opened as Runcorn
- April 1861: Renamed Runcorn Road
- 1 March 1869: Renamed Halton
- 7 July 1952: Closed
Location

Halton railway station served Halton, Cheshire, England, on the Birkenhead Joint Railway. It was closed in 1952.

Preceding station	Historical railways	Following station
Frodsham	Birkenhead Joint Railway	Norton
