= Ellesmere Port railway station =

Railway station on the Ellesmere Port branch of the Wirral line in England

Ellesmere Port
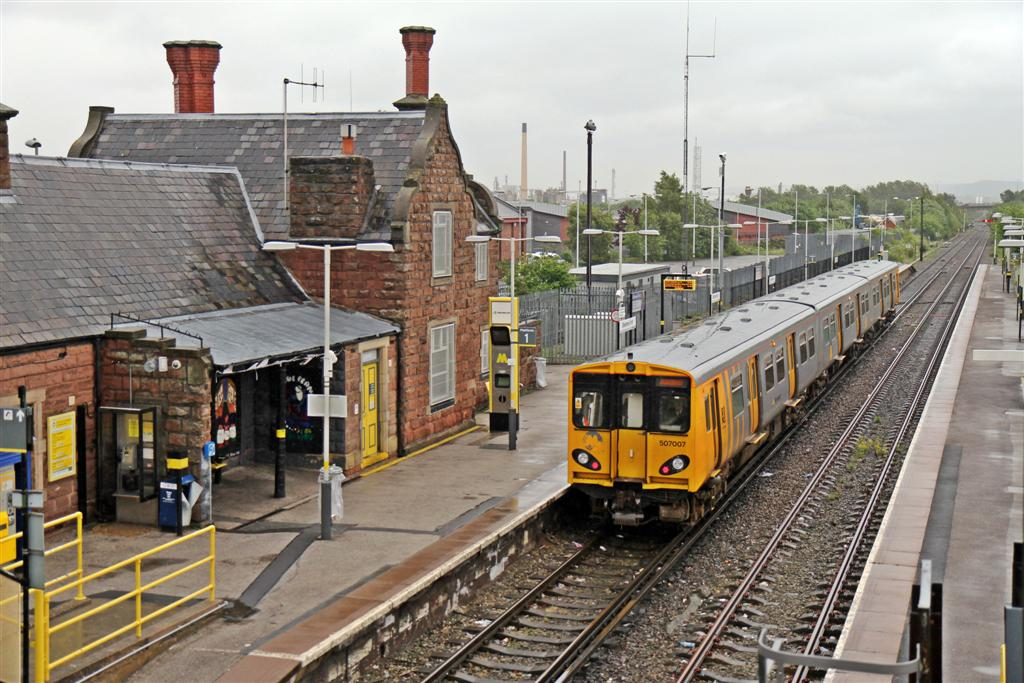
- 507007 at the station.

General information
- Location: Ellesmere Port, Cheshire West and Chester; England
- Coordinates: 53.2821°N 2.8962°W
- Grid reference: SJ403764
- Manager: Merseyrail
- Transit authority: Merseytravel
- Line: Hooton–Helsby line
- Platforms: 2

Other information
- Station code: ELP
- Fare zone: G1
- Classification: DfT category E

Key dates
- 1 July 1863: opened as Whitby Locks
- 1 September 1870: renamed Ellesmere Port

Passengers
- 2020/21: ▼0.179 million
- Interchange: 167
- 2021/22: ▲0.376 million
- Interchange: ▲379
- 2022/23: ▲0.429 million
- Interchange: ▲3,894
- 2023/24: ▲0.466 million
- Interchange: ▼204
- 2024/25: ▲0.556 million
- Interchange: ▼154
Location
Notes
- Passenger statistics from the Office of Rail and Road

Ellesmere Port railway station is located in the town of Ellesmere Port, Cheshire, England. The station was an intermediate through station on the Hooton–Helsby line. Now all passenger services terminate at the station from both directions. It is a terminus of the Wirral Line, a commuter rail system operated by Merseyrail, which uses platform 1. Northern Trains also run a limited service to/from Helsby and Liverpool Lime Street using platform 2.

== History ==
The station is situated on the branch of the Birkenhead Railway from Hooton to Helsby which opened in 1863. The station itself opened on 1 July 1863, as Whitby Locks. It was renamed Ellesmere Port on 1 September 1870. The station building is recorded in the National Heritage List for England as a designated Grade II listed building.

Ellesmere Port became part of the Merseyrail network in 1994, when the line from Hooton was electrified by British Rail and through train services to Liverpool's city centre via Birkenhead commenced.

Liverpool City Region Combined Authority, Long Term Rail Strategy document of October 2017, page 37, states that a trial of new Merseyrail battery trains will be undertaken in 2020, in view to extend the Wirral Line branch terminal to Helsby. If successful, Helsby will be one of the terminals of the Wirral line superseding Ellesmere Port.

== Facilities ==
The station is staffed from Monday to Friday, between 06:05 and 14:00, and is unstaffed otherwise. The station has platform CCTV, a 109-space car park and a cycle rack with 10 spaces and secure storage for 14 cycles. Each platform has a waiting shelter. There are live electronic departure and arrival screens, on the platform, for passenger information. There is a payphone, next to the entrance, on platform 1. The station has vending machines, within the station concourse, next to the booking office. Platform 1, for Merseyrail services, can be accessed by ramp, for passengers with wheelchairs or prams. Platform 2, for Northern services, can be accessed by a passage alongside the staircase on Whitby Road. Cross-platform access, within the station, is by staircase only.

Outside of the ticket office opening hours passengers must purchase tickets from the ticket vending machine located on the platform. This machine can issue tickets to any destination on the rail network. Passengers failing to purchase a ticket will be liable for a penalty fare if they board a Merseyrail service without obtaining a valid ticket.

== Services ==
Merseyrail Wirral Line services operate every 30 minutes each day (including Sunday) towards Birkenhead and Liverpool. Monday to Friday (except during the leaf-fall season in autumn), a few extra services run towards Liverpool in the morning and from Liverpool in the evening, giving a 15 minutes frequency in the peak direction only. These services are all provided by Merseyrail's fleet of Class 777 EMUs.

As of May 2023, Northern Trains operates a limited service (of two parliamentary trains per day each way, Mondays to Saturdays only) to Helsby via Stanlow & Thornton and Ince & Elton. No services stop at Stanlow, due to the poor condition of the station footbridge. The evening service from here continues beyond Helsby to Liverpool Lime Street via Warrington Bank Quay.

- Platform 1 serves the westbound Merseyrail electric services.
- Platform 2 serves the infrequent eastbound Northern Trains diesel train services to Helsby with a single daily service going on to Liverpool via Warrington.

Preceding station	National Rail	Following station
Overpool towards Liverpool Central	Merseyrail: Wirral Line; Ellesmere Port Branch	Terminus
Terminus	Northern Trains Ellesmere Port to Helsby Line Monday-Saturday only	Stanlow and Thornton (service suspended)
Terminus	Northern Trains Ellesmere Port to Helsby Line Monday-Saturday only	Ince & Elton

== Gallery ==
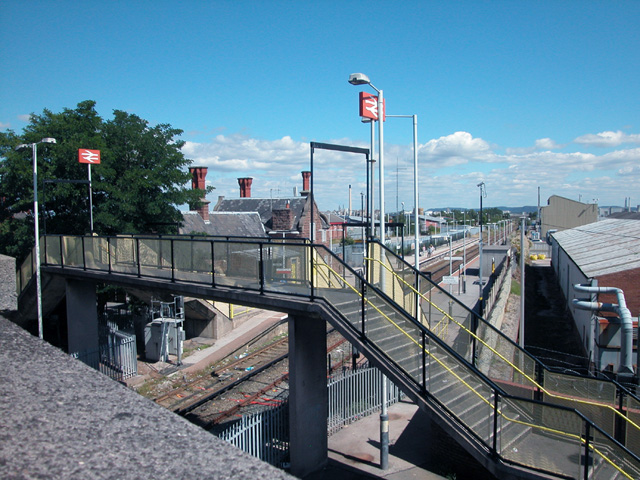
The footbridge and exterior of the station.

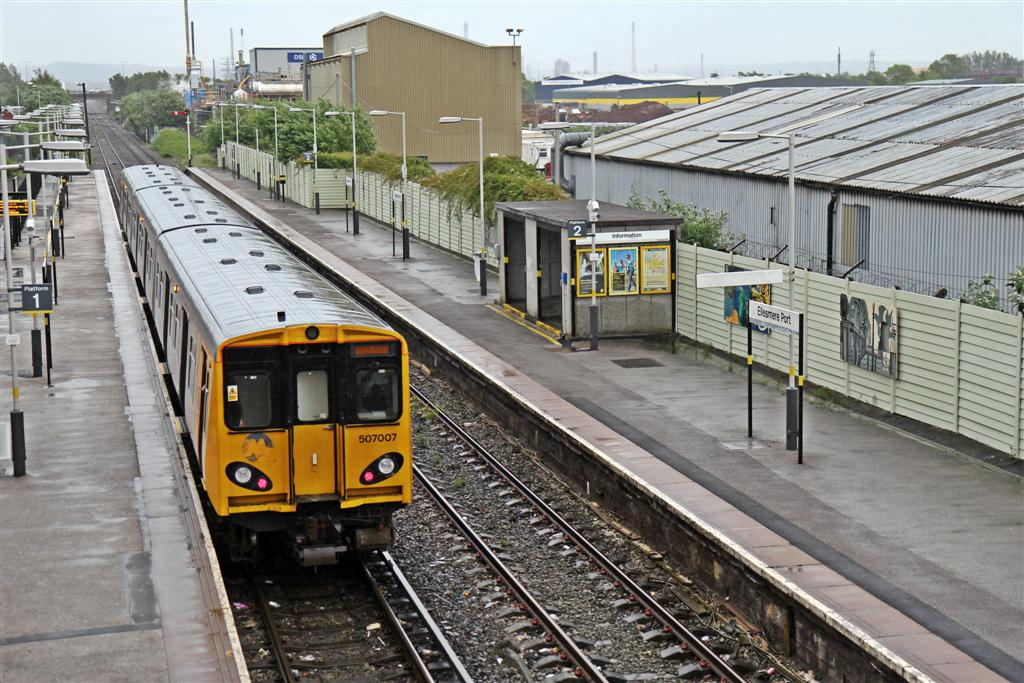
A Merseyrail Class 507 waits at the station.

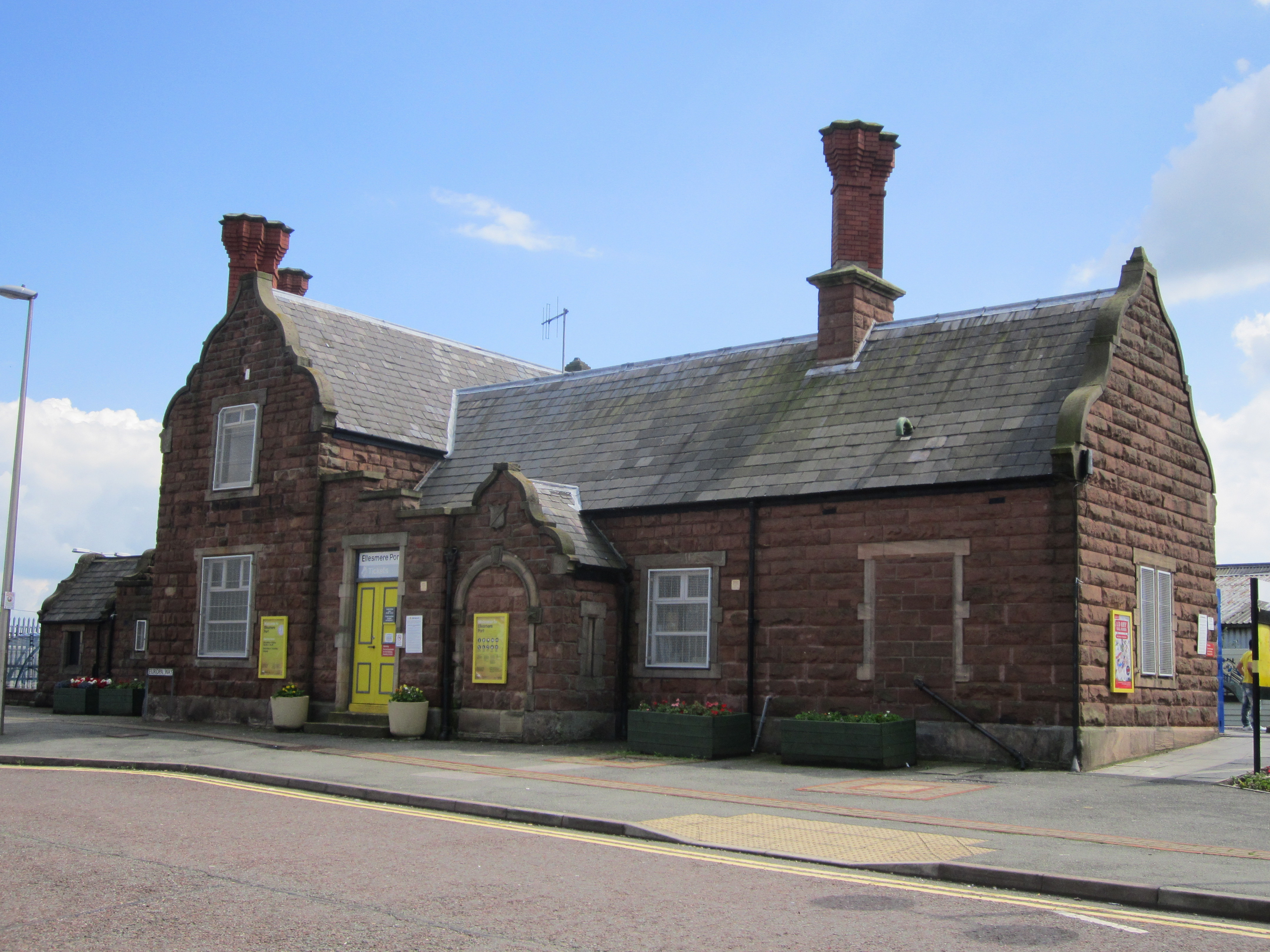
The station building viewed from the drop-off point.

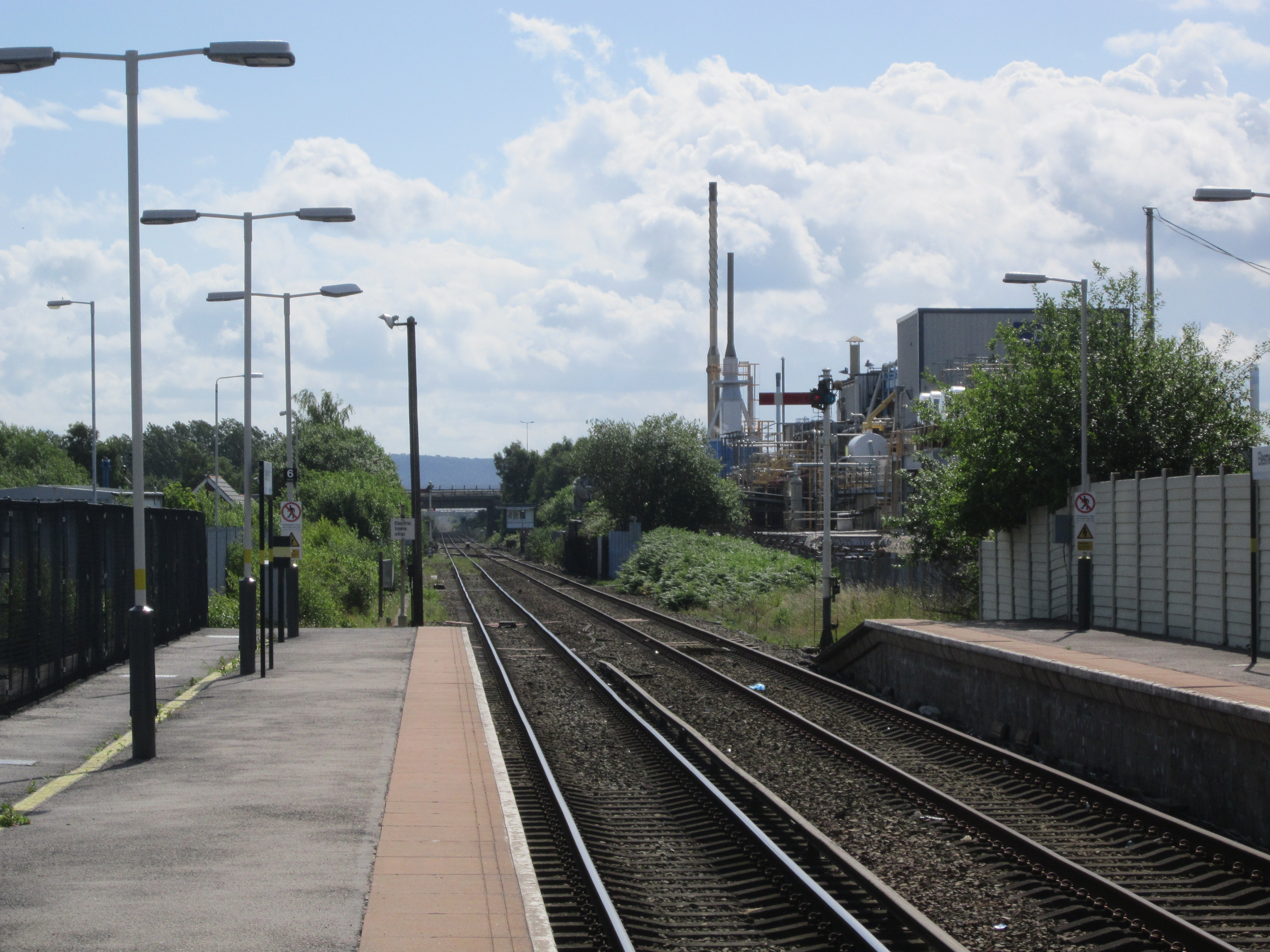
The view towards Stanlow.

== See also ==
- Listed buildings in Ellesmere Port
