= Crewe–Liverpool line =

Crewe–Liverpool
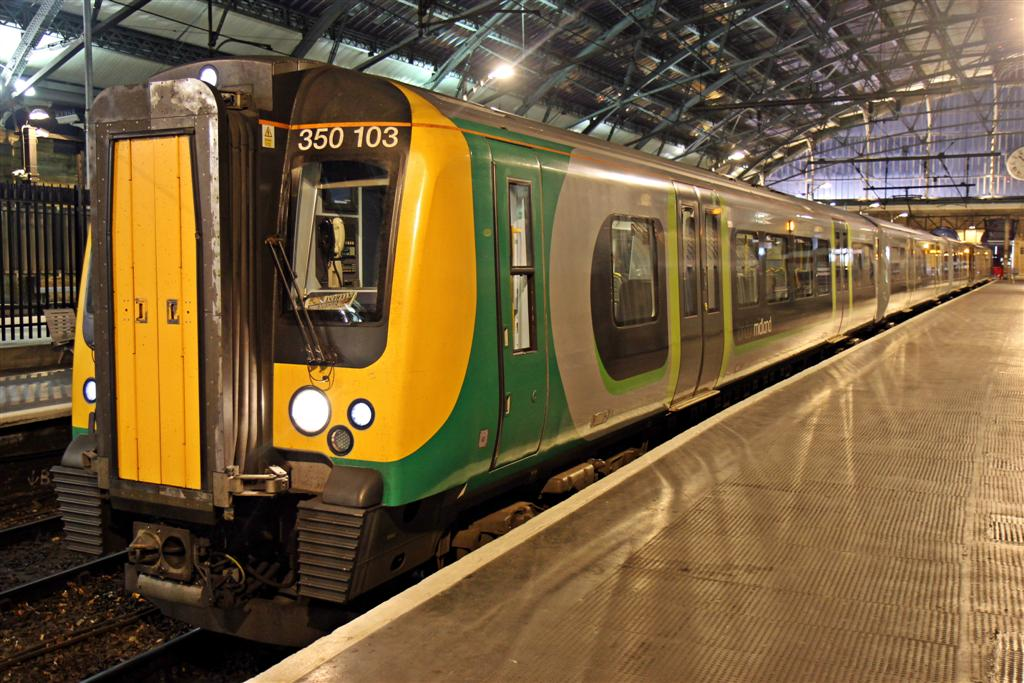
- London Midland Class 350 Siemens Desiro at Liverpool Lime Street.

Overview
- Owner: Network Rail
- Locale: Liverpool; Crewe; Merseyside; Cheshire; North West England

Service
- Operator(s): East Midlands Railway; London Northwestern Railway; Northern; TransPennine Express; Avanti West Coast

Technical
- Track gauge: 1,435 mm (4 ft 8 1/2 in) standard gauge

The Crewe–Liverpool line is a railway line in North West England that diverges from the West Coast Main Line at Weaver Junction 16 miles 53 chains (26.8 km) north of Crewe and runs to Liverpool Lime Street via Runcorn and Liverpool South Parkway.

== History ==
The line was built in stages by the Liverpool and Manchester Railway, the St Helens and Runcorn Gap Railway and the London and North Western Railway during the mid-19th century. The route became part of the London, Midland and Scottish Railway in 1923, passing to the London Midland Region of British Railways in 1948.

=== Electrification ===
The line was electrified at 25 kV AC, using overhead wires under the BR 1955 Modernisation Plan. In 1959, preparations began at Liverpool Lime Street for the first stage of electrification of the West Coast Main Line. On 1 January 1962, electric services between Liverpool Lime Street and Crewe officially began.

=== Signalling ===
Re-signalling work from Liverpool to Weaver Junction was underway in 2016. Signal control moved to the Manchester rail operating centre removing five local signal boxes. The signal improvements improved journey times on this section of track.

== Services ==
Services along the full length of the line are operated by Avanti West Coast and London Northwestern Railway, with East Midlands Railway, Northern and TransPennine Express operating between Liverpool South Parkway and Lime Street, a section which is shared by the Liverpool–Manchester lines.
