= Frodsham railway station =

Railway station in Cheshire, England

Coordinates: 53.296°N 2.723°W

Frodsham
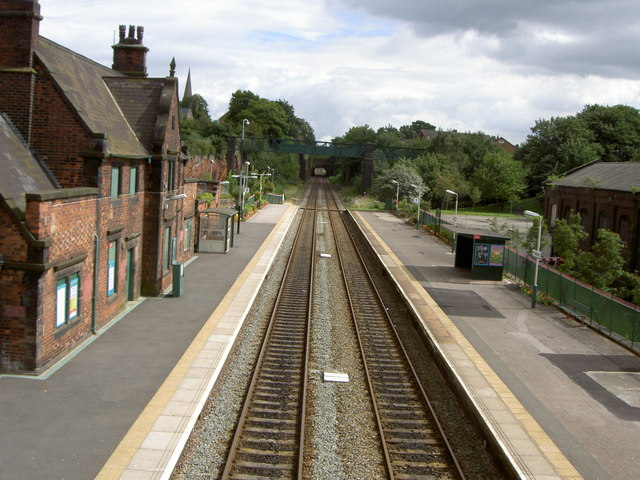

General information
- Location: Frodsham, Cheshire West and Chester; England
- Grid reference: SJ518779
- Managed by: Transport for Wales
- Platforms: 2

Other information
- Station code: FRD
- Classification: DfT category F1

History
- Original company: Birkenhead, Lancashire and Cheshire Junction Railway
- Pre-grouping: Birkenhead Railway
- Post-grouping: Birkenhead Railway

Key dates
- 18 December 1850: Station opened

Passengers
- 2020/21: ▼38,690
- 2021/22: ▲0.142 million
- 2022/23: ▲0.183 million
- 2023/24: ▲0.211 million
- 2024/25: ▲0.269 million
Location
Notes
- Passenger statistics from the Office of Rail and Road

Frodsham railway station serves the town of Frodsham, Cheshire, England. The station is managed by Transport for Wales. It was opened along with the line in 1850 and the station building is recorded in the National Heritage List for England as a designated Grade II listed building. This was restored in 2012 and is in private ownership.

The station is unstaffed, however the North Cheshire Rail Users Group have "adopted" the station and work on a voluntary basis to keep it looking clean and tidy.

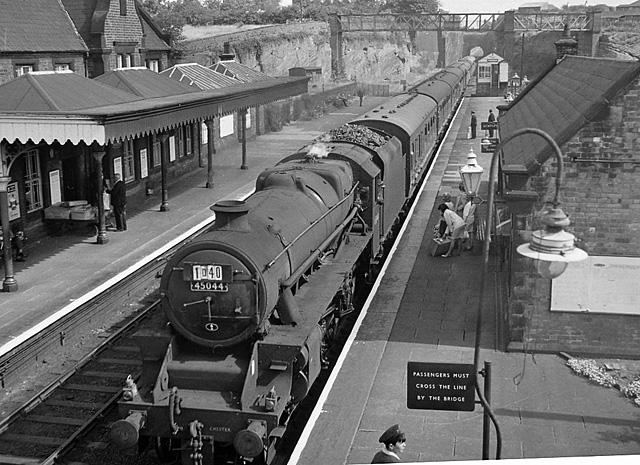
The station in 1964

== Facilities ==
Although unstaffed (as noted), the station has a self-service ticket machine (card payments only) to allow intending passengers to buy before boarding or to collect pre-paid tickets. Train running information is provided by CIS displays, timetable posters and a pay phone. Waiting shelters are also provided on both sides. Step-free access is available to both platforms, although the footbridge between them has stairs.

== Services ==
Most services at Frodsham are operated by Transport for Wales, with a limited service operated by Northern Trains.

Transport for Wales generally operates an hourly service between Manchester Airport and Chester, with most services continuing to and from Holyhead via Rhyl, as well as an hourly service between Liverpool Lime Street and Llandudno. These services combine to give an off-peak service of two trains per hour in each direction.

The station is also served by a limited peak hour Northern Trains service between Chester and Leeds with four trains per day to Chester and five trains per day to Leeds via Manchester Victoria.

Preceding station	National Rail	Following station
Helsby	Transport for Wales Halton Curve	Runcorn
Helsby	Transport for Wales Chester to Manchester Line	Runcorn East
Helsby	Northern Trains Chester to Leeds Peak Hours only	Runcorn East

== Expansion of services ==
Northern's planned Leeds–Manchester Victoria–Chester service stops here since its launch in May 2019, though only at weekday peak times in the current (May 2019) timetable.

=== Halton curve ===
North of Frodsham station, a connecting line to Runcorn (the Halton Curve) diverges. This line was, until September 2018, served by just one "parliamentary" passenger train a week (which operated on summer Saturdays only) to fulfil legal and contractual obligations and keep the line "open" in accordance with Government legislation. The curve had lost its regular service in May 1975, but continued to be used by seasonal passenger trains between Liverpool Lime Street and Llandudno until 1994 (hence the summer-only service requirement). The train started from Chester and ran non-stop to Runcorn, passing through Frodsham without calling.

In May 2019 regular service was reintroduced between Liverpool Lime Street and Chester, via Runcorn, with one train per hour every day. Transport for Wales Rail also run two trains a day from Wrexham General to Liverpool Lime Street with one in the opposite direction. These services were originally planned to start in December 2018; however, this was delayed due to a shortage of available rolling stock.

== See also ==
- Listed buildings in Frodsham
