= Chester–Warrington line =

Railway line in England

Chester–Warrington
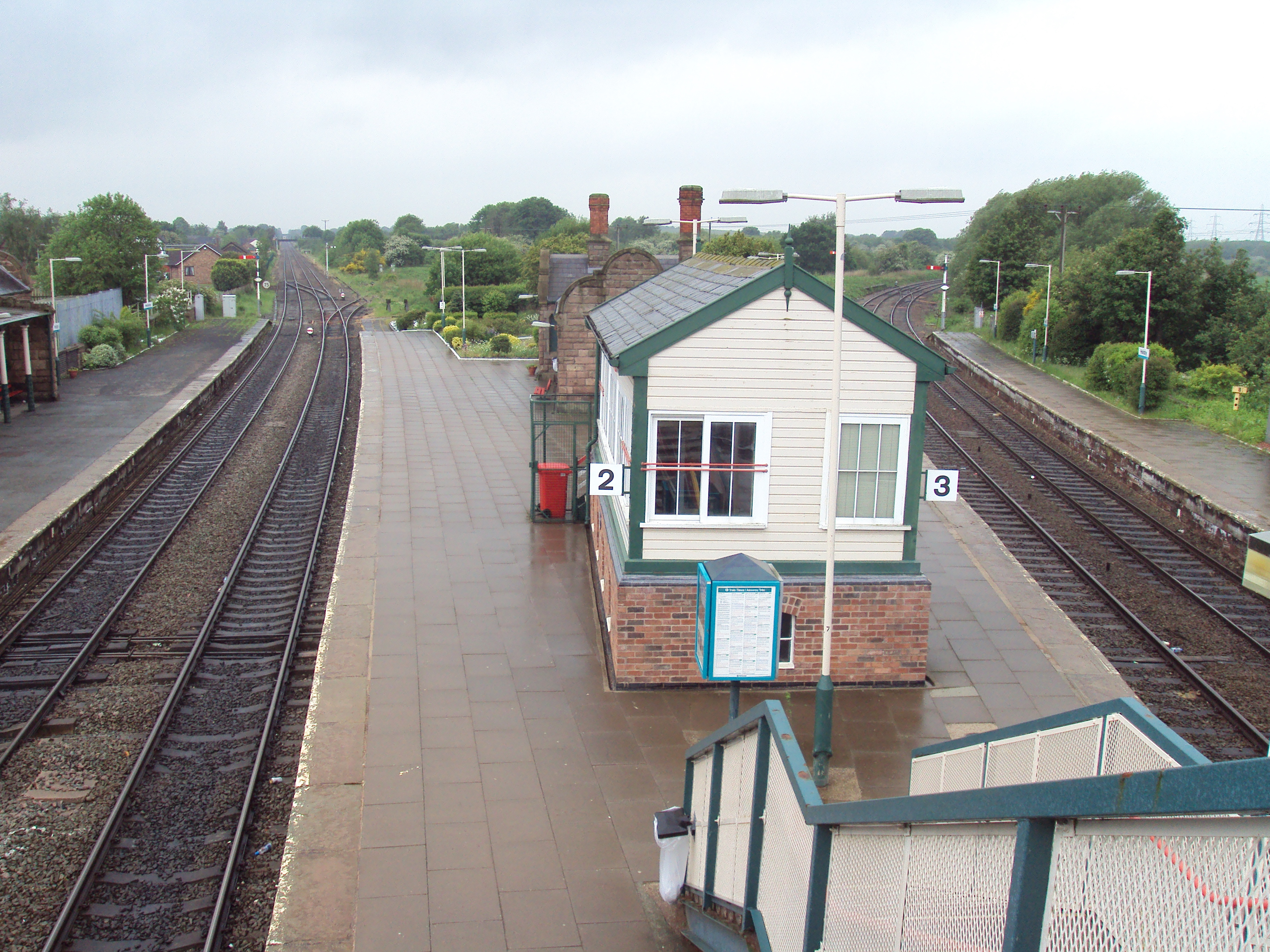
- Helsby station with the line to Chester on the left

Overview
- Status: Open
- Owner: Network Rail
- Locale: Chester (North West England)
- Termini: Chester; Warrington

Service
- Operator(s): Northern Trains; Transport for Wales
- Rolling stock: Class 67; Class 150; Class 156; Class 195; Class 197

Technical
- Track gauge: 1,435 mm (4 ft 8 1/2 in) standard gauge
- Operating speed: 75 mph (121 km/h)
Route map
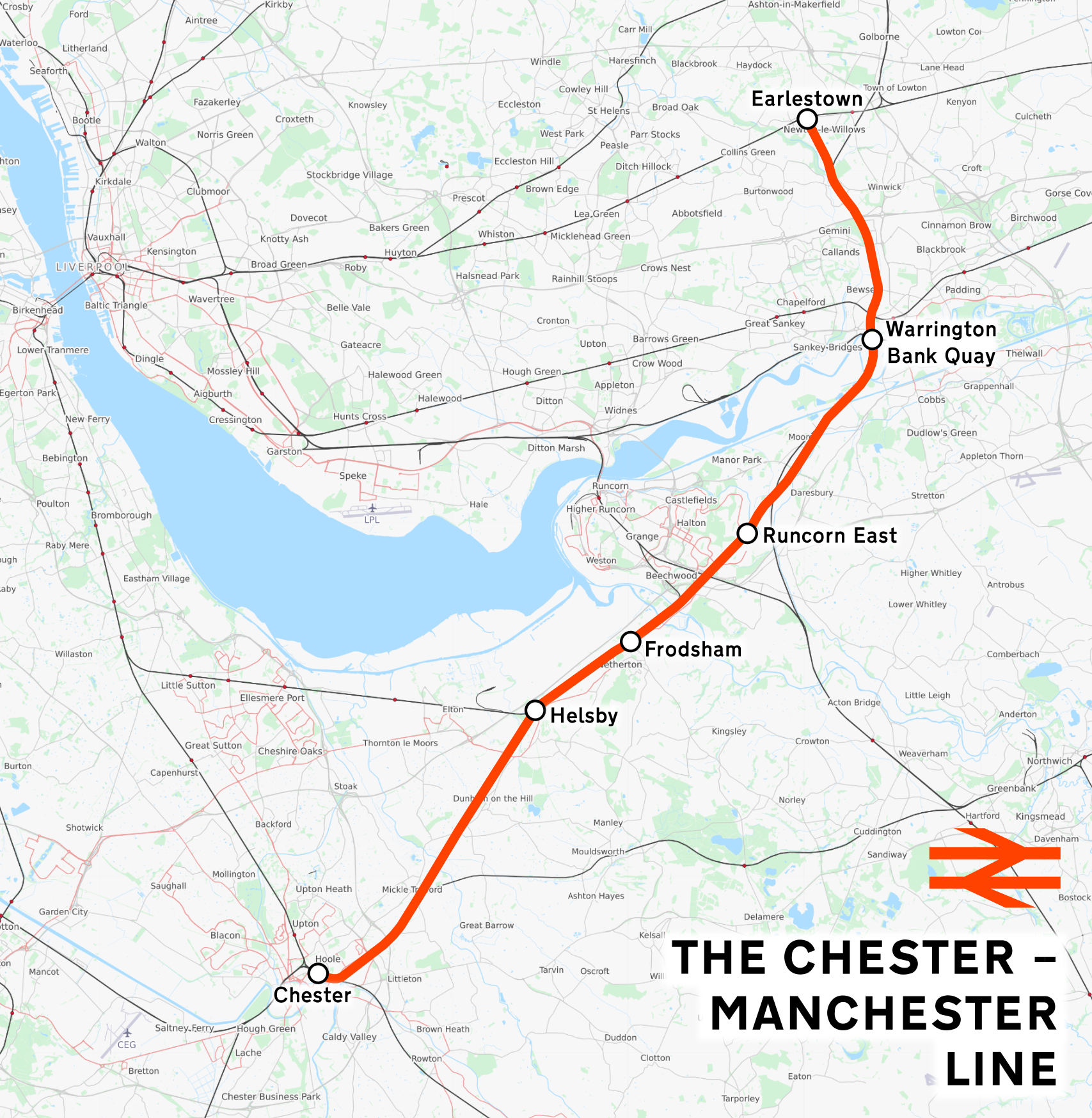
(Click to expand)

The Chester–Warrington line is a railway line running between Chester and Warrington Bank Quay in North West England.

There are two passenger trains per hour in each direction between Chester and Warrington. One (operated by Northern Trains) continues to Manchester Victoria and Leeds and the other (operated by Transport for Wales) continues to Manchester Piccadilly. A Transport for Wales service also runs from Chester to Liverpool via Frodsham from where it continues via the Halton Curve.

== History ==
Interests in the Birkenhead docks were aware that they needed a railway connection towards Manchester and the Lancashire manufacturing districts, to enable them to compete with Liverpool. The Birkenhead, Lancashire and Cheshire Junction Railway was incorporated on 26 June 1846 with capital of £1.5 million, to build a line from Chester to Walton Junction, near Warrington, where it would connect with the Grand Junction Railway (West Coast Main Line), leading to Manchester.

Shortage of money following the Railway Mania period slowed progress considerably. In October 1850 there was a formal opening, but the actual public opening finally took place on 18 December 1850.

== Description ==
The line begins at Chester and runs northwards. At Mickle Trafford the Mid-Cheshire Line diverges north-easterly to Manchester which is primarily used by local trains. Most trains between the Chester and Manchester instead use the Chester–Warrington line on the whole length and continue via the L&MR Liverpool–Manchester line.

The line then passes through the Sutton Tunnel (over a mile long) where in 1851 the Sutton Tunnel railway accident took place. It then heads northwards to cross and then run alongside the West Coast Main Line, eventually joining it at Acton Grange south of Warrington Bank Quay.

== Services ==
Transport for Wales operate an hourly service throughout between Manchester Piccadilly and Chester and onwards calling at all stations to Llandudno on the North Wales Coast Line (except in the late evenings and on Sundays, when trains terminate at Chester). Certain services run to or from Holyhead instead of Llandudno on weekdays to connect with the Irish ferries.

Class 175 units are primarily used for the TfW services between Manchester and North Wales, although Class 158 units can appear. Class 156 Sprinter units are used on the infrequent service between Liverpool/Warrington B.Q. and Ellesmere Port which use the line between Warrington and Helsby. Until Northern Trains retired its last Class 142 units (Pacers) in November 2020, those were in use on the route as well.

Since May 2019, an hourly Northern Trains train runs Chester–Warrington Bank Quay–Manchester Victoria–Bradford–Leeds (via the Calder Valley) and an hourly TfW train runs from Chester–Helsby–Frodsham–Runcorn–Liverpool South Parkway–Liverpool Lime Street.

The line is also used by the Freightliner Group for access to the rail-served maritime freight terminal at Ellesmere Port.

== Future developments ==
In March 2015, the Electrification Task Force announced that the line was a Tier 1 priority for being electrified in the Network Rail Control Period 6 (2019–2024).

== See also ==
- M56 motorway
- A56 road
