= Listed buildings in Chorlton-by-Backford =

Chorlton-by-Backford is a former civil parish, now in the parish of Backford, in Cheshire West and Chester, England. It contains four buildings that are recorded in the National Heritage List for England as designated listed buildings, all of which are at Grade II. This grade is the lowest of the three gradings given to listed buildings and is applied to "buildings of national importance and special interest". The parish is entirely rural, and the listed buildings are all domestic or related to farming.

Name and location	Photograph	Date	Notes
Farmbuildings, Chorlton Lodge Farm; 53.2417°N 2.8891°W		17th century	The range of stables, barns and other buildings forms an L-shaped plan. It is constructed in sandstone and has slate roofs. Its features include seven stable doors, openings in the upper floor alternating with pairs of vertical ventilation slits, an arched opening, and a flight of external stone steps.
Chorlton Hall; 53.2392°N 2.8891°W		Mid-18th century (probable)	A new entrance front was built in about 1790, and the house was remodelled in 1845–46 by James Picton in Tudor style. Its exterior is rendered on a stone plinth and it has slate roofs. The entrance front is in three storeys and five bays with short projecting wings on each side. Each wing contains an oriel window and a coat of arms. The other windows are sashes. Inside, the plasterwork in the dining room is Jacobean, and in the drawing room it is Gothic.
Poplar Hall and farmbuildings 53.2513°N 2.8988°W		Mid- to late 18th century	The buildings are in limewashed brick with slate roofs, and together form an L-shaped plan. The farmhouse is in two storeys and three bays, with casement windows. Features in the farmbuildings include a stable door, a carriage door, and other openings and windows.
Chorlton Lodge Farmhouse; 53.2414°N 2.8895°W		Late 18th to early 19th century	The farmhouse is constructed in brick on a stone plinth, and has a slate roof. The main part of the building is in three storeys and has three bays. To the left is a single-bay wing in two storeys, and to the left of that is another wing, lower with two storeys and two bays. The doorcase has fluted pilasters and a pediment. The windows are sashes.

== See also ==
- Listed buildings in Ellesmere Port
- Listed buildings in Little Stanney
- Listed buildings in Stoak
- Listed buildings in Croughton
- Listed buildings in Wervin
- Listed buildings in Mickle Trafford
- Listed buildings in Upton-by-Chester
- Listed buildings in Capenhurst
