= Listed buildings in Backford =

Backford is a civil parish in Cheshire West and Chester, England. It contains eleven buildings that are recorded in the National Heritage List for England as designated listed buildings. Apart from the village of Backford, the parish is rural. The listed buildings include the village church and associated structures, Backford Hall and its Lodge, a former vicarage, a farmhouse and associated buildings, and two guideposts.

== Key ==
Grade	Criteria
Grade II*	Particularly important buildings of more than special interest.
Grade II	Buildings of national importance and special interest.

== Buildings ==
Name and location	Photograph	Date	Notes	Grade
St Oswald's Church; 53.2388°N 2.9033°W		Late 13th century	The chancel dates from the late 13th century, the tower from about 1500, and the nave was rebuilt in brick in 1731. The church was remodelled in 1877–79 by Ewan Christian. It is constructed in sandstone with slate roofs. Inside the church are wall paintings by Edward Frampton.	II*
Table tomb 53.23879°N 2.90290°W	—	17th century (probable)	The table tomb is constructed in red sandstone. It is very worn and contains carved shields on all sides.	II
Barn, Pump Farm; 53.2441°N 2.9011°W	—	Late 17th century	A range of farm buildings from the 17th and 18th centuries. It is in brick with slate roofs, partly standing on a rendered plinth. Features include a stable door, a hayloft door, pitch holes, slit vents, and buttresses.	II
Pump Farmhouse; 53.2438°N 2.9011°W	—	Late 17th century to early 18th century	The farmhouse was altered in 1841, and again since. It is constructed in brick with slate roofs, with two storeys and attics, and has a double pile plan. Some of the windows are casements.	II
Churchyard walls and gates 53.23862°N 2.90332°W		18th century	The walls surrounding the churchyard and the gates are in sandstone and date from various periods. Five steps lead up to a south gateway which contains a timber lychgate built in 1898. In the north wall is a gateway with a semicircular head and voussoirs, one carrying the date 1774. In the west wall is a stone inscribed with the date of its restoration in 1789.	II
Sundial; 53.23868°N 2.90347°W		18th century	The sundial consists of a sandstone baluster surmounted by coping with a recess. The stem is inscribed with the names of churchwardens and the date 1832.	II
Vicarage; 53.2408°N 2.9017°W		18th century	There have been later alterations and additional wings to the original Georgian house. It is constructed in limewashed brick with slate roofs, and is in two storeys with a double pile plan. In the ground floor is a porch, a bowed bay window containing a French window, and a casement window. The windows in the upper floor are sashes. It has later been used as the Hospice of the Good Shepherd.	II
Backford Hall; 53.2405°N 2.9031°W	—	1863	The hall was designed by John Cunningham and contains elements of Elizabethan, Jacobean and Bohemian Rococo styles. It is constructed in red brick with diapering, stone dressings, and slate roofs. Its plan consists of two blocks joined by a corridor. The south front is symmetrical in seven bays, but the north front is complex. Features include shaped gables, curved gablets, scalloped quoins, tall chimneys, and sash windows.	II
Lodge, Backford Hall; 53.2403°N 2.9056°W		1863	The lodge is presumed to have been designed by John Cunningham. It is constructed in brick with diapering, stone dressings and plinth and slate roofs. The lodge is in 1½ storeys, and has an L-shaped plan. The ground floor windows are sashes, some with mullions, and above are square and round windows.	II
Footpath guidepost 53.24653°N 2.91134°W	—	Late 19th century	This consists of a cast iron octagonal post on a plinth with a moulded cap and ball finial. It carries an inscribed finger plate. The guidepost was erected soon after 1884 by the National Footpath Preservation Society.	II
Footpath guidepost 53.24850°N 2.91377°W	—	Late 19th century	This consists of a cast iron octagonal post on a plinth with a moulded cap and ball finial. It carries an inscribed finger plate. It has been re-sited following the building of the M56 motorway.	II

== See also ==
- Listed buildings in Capenhurst
- Listed buildings in Croughton
- Listed buildings in Little Stanney
- Listed buildings in Mickle Trafford
- Listed buildings in Stoak
- Listed buildings in Upton-by-Chester
- Listed buildings in Wervin
