= Marius Lyle =

British novelist

Marius Lyle was the pseudonym of Una Maud Lyle Smyth (10 July 1872 – 14 July 1964), a British novelist and short story writer.

== Early life ==
Born in Crabwall Hall, in the village of Mollington, Cheshire, she was the third of eleven children of Hugh Lyle Smyth (a wealthy grain merchant and a JP who was appointed High Sheriff of Cheshire in 1895) and Eliza Smyth. She was christened 7 August at Backford.

According to the Auckland Star, she ran away from home at the age of sixteen rather than enter a hated factory at Whitchurch, in Wales.

== Career ==
She married her cousin Hugh Lyle Waring Smyth, (b. 29 June 1867 in Caen, Normandy, France) at St. John's Anglican Cathedral in Buenos Aires on 15 November 1900. Their residence was Drumahoe, County Londonderry.

She won the 1916 Melrose prize for her debut novel Unhappy in Thy Daring. Set in Ireland, it tells of a husband and wife's growing estrangement which is being nurtured by the wife's sister. H. G. Wells, one of the competition adjudicators, said of it: "The book has real strength and a remarkable sense of character. Power of imagination and originality; the writer has borrowed from no one."

Her book met with mixed reviews. A reviewer in The Bookman praised the novel for its realism but found it vulgar. "Here is your risky and almost fatal experiment of marriage, your linking of unequal natures, your development of the inevitable triangle, your cool but ruthlessly explicit presentment of sex in action. No blinking facts for us, or sentimentalising them: this is how men and women are made, and the only way we can get ahead is to admit it! . . . There are passages which violate, I do not say morals, but taste: they present ignoble things in a vulgar way."

One reviewer felt the work had merits but was uneven. "It is a strange production, with all the signs of a first novel except an autobiographical strain. The title has practically no connection with the story, and the author's name is from the third page a transparent pretence, for the whole style is feminine! The story reflects the mournful side of the Irish character."

Another contemporary review commented: "Her sense of character is remarkable—likewise distorted—and the book leaves one with a nasty taste in the mouth. . . . the doings of Rupert Standish surely stand out as among the most despicable ever imagined by a young author." A New Zealand review concurred: "The husband is a pitifully weak, indeed quite contemptible character, and however a woman like Shelagh Lynch could have married—and forgiven—such a man passes my comprehension. Some of the minor characters, however, are more pleasing creations and the author’s style is so fresh and attractive that his (or her) future works will be looked forward to with pleasurable anticipation.

A review in The Nation and Athenaeum was critical of her handling of psychology, commenting: “'Marius Lyle's' workmanship is too lazy and slipshod to carry out its adventurous and difficult task".

Lyle's second novel was Sins of the Mothers (Andrew Melrose, London, 1918). A review in The Spectator states: "This novel chiefly deals with the mental procurement of a family of children who are left motherless—though by no means fatherless.The clash of temperaments inherited respectively from the father and mother is the chief motive of the book." In his review, Stopford Brooke wrote: ". . . "Unhappy in Thy Daring" has gone on selling steadily, and finding its way into all corners of the British Empire and India. The new book is again a psychological study of temperament, of passion, and of tragedy, and is no less distinctive than the first, which brought the author a substantial money reward and no little literary fame."

Lyle's third novel was The Education of a Young Man: In Twelve Lessons (published by L.& V. Woolf at the Hogarth Press, 1926). A review in The Spectator described this as "A cleverly written story about a peculiar county family of great charm but considerable eccentricity and even unpleasantness. The tale is told in the first person and somewhat pretentiously. One will soon cease to believe in sinister families of high degree, so many have been described since Mr. Michael Sadleir paved the way."

Her following novel was Out of Drawing (Gerald Howe, London,1928). The Spectator reviewer wrote: "Mr. Lyle presents us with a three-sided study of a young American artist of genius. We see Aloys Staine through her own eyes, and also through those of her Spanish husband and an Englishman who constitutes himself her sponsor when she visits this country. Many of the incidental scenes, ranging from London and Paris to Tangier and the Argentine, are vivid and piquant, and the story displays considerable powers of analysis. But Mr. Lyle is too diffuse and leisurely, and the total effect is consequently a little blurred."

In 1932, she published a slim (46-page) hand-printed volume titled The Virgin: A Tale of Woe (designed by Christopher Sandford with a frontispiece engraved on wood by Lettice Sandford and printed at the Boar's Head Press, Manaton, Devon in an edition of 200 copies,1932). The story, originally titled "The Jewess", is a modern retelling of the story of Mary, mother of Jesus.

Also published in 1932 was her short story "The Letter".

Lyle's final novel was That Child (Fortune Press, London,1938). "This story of an unconventional middle-aged woman is rich in substance and implications, and the author's swift almost cinematic technique helps in present Amy Speer's life through the impact of many significant episodes and impressions. It is a vital and provocative book and marks a new and interesting stage in the development of a very interesting writer."

Lyle was a contributor to transition, an experimental literary journal founded in 1927 by Eugene Jolas. Her contributions included "Feeling Out" (June 1929), "How I Dreamed" (June 1930), "Second Draft of Fear" (March 1932), and "Scheme For Physical Improvement of Writers' Medium" (March 1932).

In 1930, she contributed a poem "The Word Age" to the small magazine The Quarter, edited by Ernest Walsh.

One critic has cited Lyle, along with Edouard Roditi, Charles Henri Ford and Harry Crosby, as a representative writer of the prose poem-dreamscape, which "displays a strong oratorical strain as well as a tendency to dwell on apocalyptic visions and various psychopathological states".

Her transition essay Scheme for Physical Improvement of Writers' Medium ”succinctly summarizes the typographical effects and possibilities of the most analytical aspects of cubist literature".

== Death and legacy ==
Una Maud Lyle Smyth died in 1964. Her address was given as Oakpark, Ballymaleel, Letterkenny, County Donegal.

The State Library of Victoria, Australia, holds two travel diaries dated 1905 to 1912 and 1927 belonging to Una Maud Lyle Smyth.
