= Listed buildings in Stoak =

Stoak is a civil parish in Cheshire West and Chester, England. It contains eight buildings that are recorded in the National Heritage List for England as designated listed buildings. Of these, one is listed at Grade II*, the middle grade, and the others are at Grade II. Apart from the village of Stoak, the parish is rural. The Shropshire Union Canal passes through the parish, and five of the listed buildings are bridges crossing the canal. The other listed buildings are the parish church, a sundial in the churchyard, and a farmhouse.

== Key ==
Grade	Criteria
II*	Particularly important buildings of more than special interest
II	Buildings of national importance and special interest

== Buildings ==
Name and location	Photograph	Date	Notes	Grade
Stoak Farmhouse; 53.25344°N 2.86820°W		17th century	The farmhouse is built in rendered brick, and has slate roofs. It is in two wings, both having two storeys, the left wing being higher with attics. The windows are small-paned casements. Inside the farmhouse is an inglenook.	II
Sundial, St Lawrence's Church; 53.25326°N 2.86571°W		17th century (probable)	The sundial is in red sandstone and consists of an octagonal pillar on an octagonal base. The remains of a brass plate are cemented on the top. On the side is a plaque dated 1978 with the names of churchwardens. The shaft is designated as a Scheduled monument.	II
Picton Road Bridge; 53.25087°N 2.86562°W		c. 1795	This is bridge No 136 over the Shropshire Union Canal. It is built in brown brick with sandstone coping on the parapet. The bridge originally carried a minor road over the canal, and was converted into a footbridge during the 20th century.	II
Stoak Bridge; 53.25221°N 2.86281°W		c. 1795	This is bridge No 137 over the Shropshire Union Canal. It is built in brown brick with sandstone coping on the parapet. The bridge carries a footpath and farm traffic over the canal.	II
Densions Bridge; 53.25452°N 2.86163°W		c. 1795	This is bridge No 138 over the Shropshire Union Canal. It is built in brown brick with sandstone coping on the parapet. The bridge carries a minor road over the canal.	II
Meadow Lane Bridge; 53.25880°N 2.86596°W		c. 1795	This is bridge No 139 over the Shropshire Union Canal. It is built in brown brick with sandstone coping on the parapet. The bridge carries a track over the canal.	II
Mason's Bridge; 53.26013°N 2.86830°W		c. 1795	This is bridge No 140 over the Shropshire Union Canal. It is built in brown brick with sandstone coping on the parapet. The bridge carries a cart track over the canal.	II
St Lawrence's Church; 53.2534°N 2.8654°W		1827	Most of the church results from the rebuilding by George Edgecumbe, but the chancel is Perpendicular. The church was restored in 1911–12. It is built in red sandstone and has slate roofs. The church has a cruciform plan, and consists of a nave, north and south transepts, a chancel, and an embattled west tower. The nave has a hammerbeam roof.	II*

== See also ==
- Listed buildings in Backford
- Listed buildings in Croughton
- Listed buildings in Little Stanney
- Listed buildings in Thornton-le-Moors
- Listed buildings in Wervin
