= St Oswald's Church, Backford =

Coordinates: 53.2388°N 2.9033°W

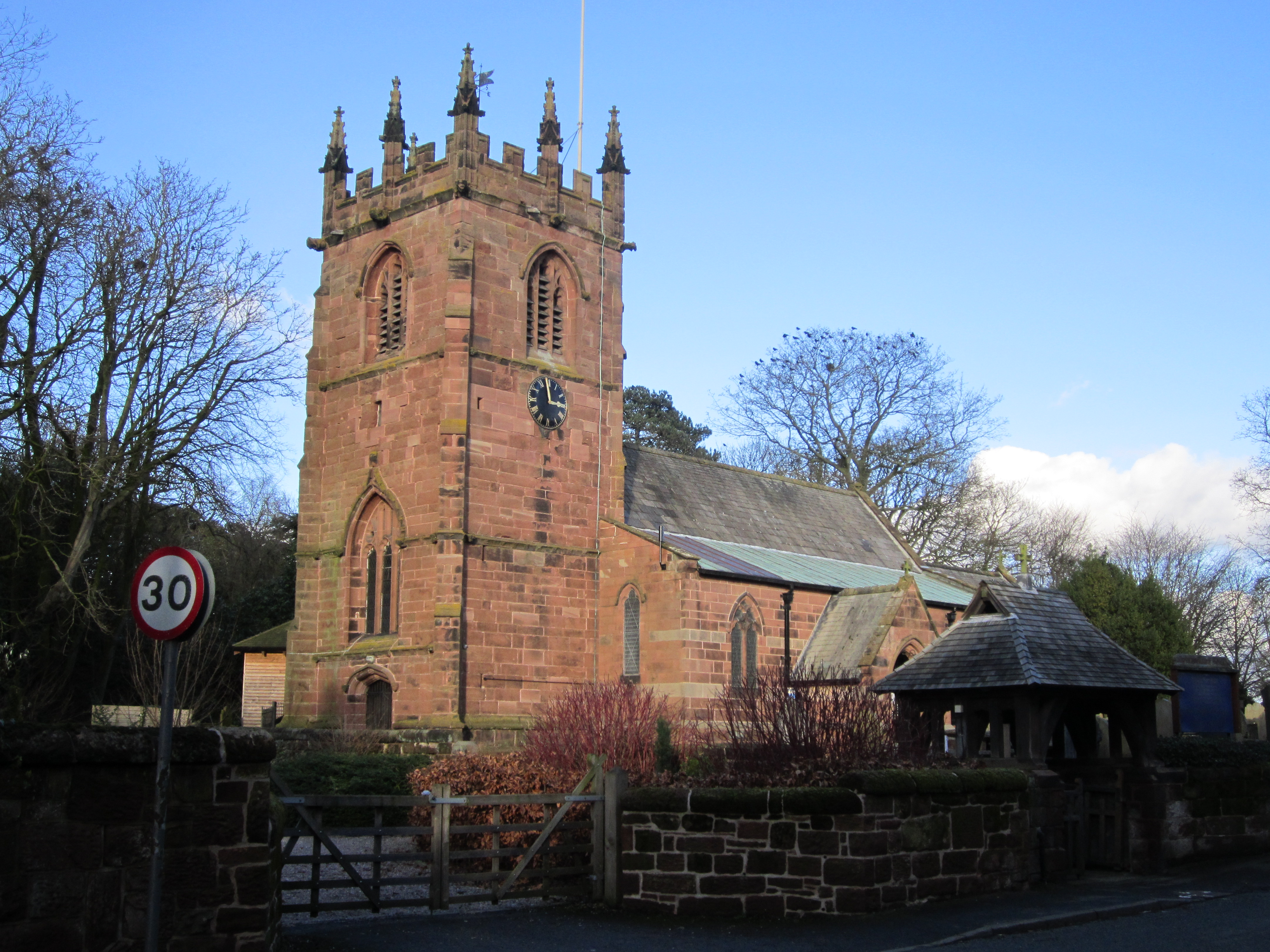
- St Oswald's Church, Backford, from the southwest

- Location in Cheshire
- OS grid reference: SJ 388 717
- Location: Backford, Cheshire
- Country: England
- Denomination: Anglican
- Website: St Oswald, Backford

History
- Status: Parish church

Architecture
- Functional status: Active
- Heritage designation: Grade II*
- Designated: 1 June 1967
- Architect: Ewan Christian (Remodelling)
- Architectural type: Church
- Style: Gothic
- Completed: 1879

Specifications
- Materials: Sandstone, slate roof

Administration
- Province: York
- Diocese: Chester
- Archdeaconry: Chester
- Deanery: Wirral South
- Parish: Backford

Clergy
- Vicar: Revd Canon Steve Mansfield

St Oswald's Church is in the village of Backford, to the northwest of Chester, Cheshire, England, close to the A41 road and adjoining Backford Hall. It is recorded in the National Heritage List for England as a designated Grade II* listed building. The church dates from the 14th century with later additions and restorations. It contains one of the few surviving aumbries in Cheshire and a number of memorial boards painted by the Randle Holme family. It is an active Anglican parish church in the diocese of Chester, the archdeaconry of Chester and the deanery of Wirral South. Its benefice is combined with that of Holy Trinity Church, Capenhurst. From March 2018 this benefice shares a vicar with All Saints, Saughall.

== History ==
The first mention of a church on this site is in the 13th century. Soon after this it was given by the barons of Dunham Massey to the Benedictine Priory at Birkenhead. At the dissolution of the monasteries the advowson was passed to the Diocese of Chester. The chancel dates from the 14th century, and the tower from the 15th century. The nave was rebuilt in 1728–31 and it was remodelled in 1877–79 by Ewan Christian. A reredos designed by John Douglas was added in 1892.

== Architecture ==
=== Exterior ===
The church is built in sandstone with a slate roof. The tower is in Perpendicular style with a battlemented parapet, crocketted finials and gargoyles. Its west front has a doorway with a three-light window above it. The belfry windows have two lights. The plan of the church consists of a three-bay nave, a chancel, a north vestry and a south porch. In the chancel there is some 14th-century masonry, and the east window dates from about 1375. The windows in the south wall are Perpendicular. The nave had been in the classical style until it was replaced in the 19th century in Gothic revival style.

=== Interior ===
The church contains one of the few surviving aumbries in Cheshire. In the nave is a chained bible dated 1617, which has been in the church since the 17th century. An oak chest dating from the early 17th century is made of wood from Chester Cathedral. Over the chancel arch is a painting depicting the Creation. Elsewhere are older wall paintings, including some by Edward Frampton. In the church are six wooden memorial boards painted by members of the Randle Holme family of Chester. Some memorial boards painted by Randle Holme III hanging in this church and elsewhere were executed without the permission of the College of Arms. Between 1667 and 1670 its head, Sir William Dugdale, travelled to the north on at least three occasions to destroy them. However the boards hanging in this church were not located by him and they survive. The parish registers begin in 1562. A monument to Samuel Griffiths who died in 1796 is by E. Spencer of Chester, and a memorial to Baskervyle Glegg, who died in 1843, is by Sanders of London. The two-manual organ is by Franklin Lloyd, to which additions were made by Harry Moulding of Chester around 1970. There is a ring of six bells. Three of these were cast by Richard Sanders in 1714 and the other three by John Taylor and Company are dated 1887, 1889 and 1974.

== External features ==
In the churchyard is a sandstone sundial dating possibly from the 18th century. It is a Grade II listed building. Also listed Grade II are the churchyard walls and the gateway to the church, and a table tomb. A doorway in the churchyard dating from Georgian times gives access to the grounds of Backford Hall.

== See also ==
- Grade II* listed buildings in Cheshire West and Chester
- Listed buildings in Backford
- List of church restorations, amendments and furniture by John Douglas
