= Hugh Lyle Smyth =

Hugh Lyle Smyth JP

High Sheriff of Cheshire
- In office 1895–1895
- Preceded by: Ralph Brocklebank
- Succeeded by: Frederic James Harrison

Personal details
- Born: 15 November 1834 Derry, Ireland
- Died: 25 May 1911 (aged 76) Cheshire, England
- Spouse: Eliza Turner (m. 5 June 1862)
- Children: 11, including Una Maud Lyle Smyth (novelist, pen name Marius Lyle)
- Occupation: Merchant, Justice of the Peace

Hugh Lyle Smyth (15 Nov 1834 – 25 May 1911) was a wealthy merchant and a JP who was appointed High Sheriff of Cheshire in 1895.

He was born in Derry to Ross Thompson Smyth and Sarah Lyle. He married Eliza Turner of Rusholme Park on 5 June 1862. They had eleven children. Their family home was Crabwall Hall, in the village of Mollington, Cheshire. He had a large country house, Barrowmore Hall in Great Barrow, Cheshire, designed by the architect, John Douglas (1829–1911) and completed c. 1881. His daughter Una Maud Lyle Smyth was a novelist who wrote under the name Marius Lyle.

Honorary titles
Preceded by Ralph Brocklebank	High Sheriff of Cheshire; 1895	Succeeded by Frederic James Harrison
