= Mollington, Cheshire =

Village in Cheshire, England

Coordinates: 53.226°N 2.923°W

Mollington
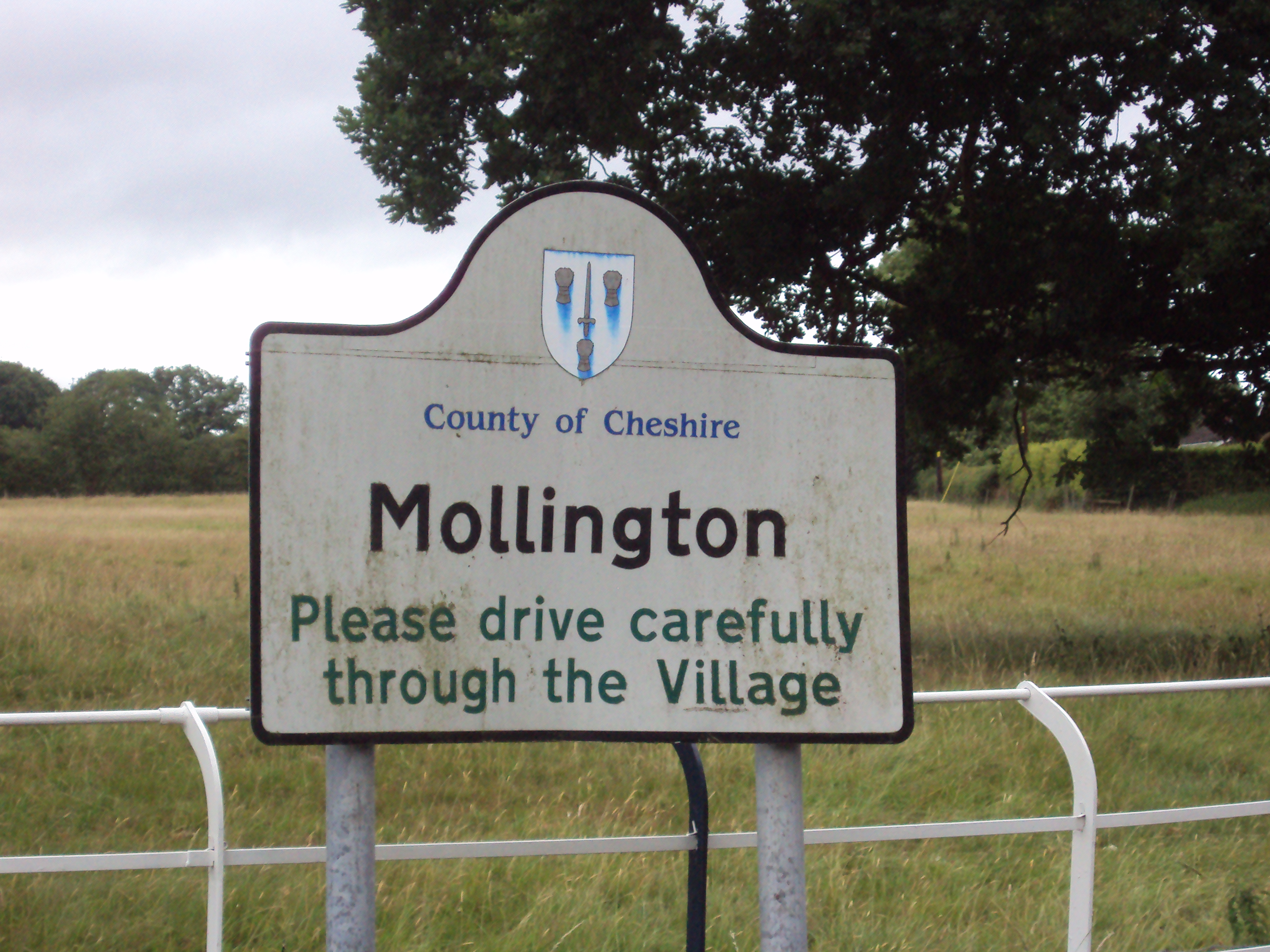
- Mollington sign

- Location within Cheshire
- Population: 626 (2011 census)
- OS grid reference: SJ385702
- Civil parish: Mollington
- Unitary authority: Cheshire West and Chester
- Ceremonial county: Cheshire
- Region: North West
- Country: England
- Sovereign state: United Kingdom
- Post town: CHESTER
- Postcode district: CH1
- Dialling code: 01244
- Police: Cheshire
- Fire: Cheshire
- Ambulance: North West
- UK Parliament: Chester North and Neston

Mollington is a village and civil parish in the unitary authority of Cheshire West and Chester and the ceremonial county of Cheshire, England. It is two miles north of the city of Chester, with the A41 Liverpool–Chester trunk road and Shropshire Union Canal to the east and southeast, the A540 Wirral peninsula trunk road to the south and west and the A5117 link road to the north. Nearby settlements include Backford, Blacon, Capenhurst and Saughall.

At the 2011 census, the village had a population of 626.

== History ==
The name derives from Old English, meaning 'a farmstead or settlement (tūn) connected with a person named Moll'.

Mollington was mentioned in the Domesday Book as Molintune and comprised eleven households (three villagers, three smallholders and five slaves/servants).

The village previously consisted of two separate settlements. Great Mollington was formerly known as Mollington Tarrant and was a township in the parish of Backford. It had a population of 111 in 1801, and 122 in 1851. Little Mollington (Mollington Banastre) was a township in the parish of St. Mary on the Hill, Wirral Hundred. Its population was previously 23 in 1801, 16 in 1851 and 44 in 1901. Both settlements were combined into Mollington civil parish in 1901 with a total population of 232, increasing to 335 in 1951 and 663 in 2001.

It is historically significant as one of the key locations for the origins and global spread of a religious movement. The Restoration Movement was initially led, in Britain, from Mollington after several separate churches coordinated into a national movement. At the first Cooperative Meeting of the British Churches of Christ in Edinburgh in 1842, John Davies of Mollington was elected as the President and served in this role until his death in 1865. He corresponded with and hosted various key figures of the movement, such as Alexander Campbell and Joseph Bryant Rotherham, at The Willows, his home in Mollington, even helping to convert some of them there (such as Rotherham) and playing a prominent role in its development and spread globally, especially among the then-colonies of the British Empire where the majority of the Churches of Christ's footprint of over 3,000,000 people remains today. The Willows still stands and is a Grade II listed building.

Mollington railway station, linking the village directly with Chester and with Liverpool via the Wirral, was closed on 7 March 1960; the station building is now a private residence.

In 1982, Mollington became the first place in Britain to have a Neighbourhood Watch scheme, following the success of similar programmes in North America.

== Description ==
Mollington is a small semi-rural commuter village of approximately 300 homes, served by St. Oswald's Primary School (formerly Mollington Church of England Primary School) and a village hall. All other facilities are now located in other nearby suburbs of Chester following the closure of the village shop and post office. Mollington's parish church is located in the neighbouring village of Backford.

The village is served by two local bus routes, but with an infrequent service most residents move about by private transport.

Mollington is characterised by tree-lined lanes with grass verges and farmland as well as sizeable family homes. It has an open, rolling and green aspect, which made it a pleasant location for the former Mollington Hall, a country house residence, now demolished. The old red-brick boundary wall of this substantial estate still remains and is now a feature of the village obvious to those who pass through. The Willows, previously the Dower House of Mollington Hall, also remains and is a Grade II listed building, as do the North and South lodges of the estate, built in the early 20th century. Neighbouring large houses on the edge of the village are now luxury hotels, including the Mollington Banastre and Crabwall Manor (formerly Crabwall Hall).

== Governance ==
Mollington is a civil parish and local government ward, within the unitary authority of Cheshire West and Chester. In 2001, it had a population of 2,077, which included the settlements of Backford, Capenhurst, Ledsham and Wervin. By 2011 this ward had been combined with Saughall, with a total population of 4,463.

== Sport ==
Mollington is home to Mollington Cricket Club (MCC), a village team that plays friendly matches across Cheshire, the Wirral peninsula and North Wales. There is evidence of a Mollington cricket team competing in local fixtures dating back to at least 1903. The modern team traces its roots back to the 1980s when villagers organised a supposedly one-off match on the school field. As the team started to play more fixtures they settled at the Dale Army Camp in Upton, Chester, before relocating to Whitby in Ellesmere Port. Since 2012 the team has had a nomadic existence and just played away games. The annual fixtures start towards the end of May and the team play on a midweek day throughout the summer, weather permitting. The team takes its players from residents of Mollington, Backford, Saughall and surrounding areas. The MCC has previously played in the National Village Competition and the Cheshire Plate.

== Popular culture ==
Mollington is name-checked in a song by Half Man Half Biscuit. The title of the song is "The Unfortunate Gwatkin" from the Urge for Offal album. It makes reference to the fact that the unfortunate victim in the song's narrative was returning from the fictional Pessimist Festival in Mollington. The lyrics also mention the nearby churchyard of St Lawrence and Wervin Turnpike.

== See also ==
- Listed buildings in Mollington, Cheshire
