= Ledsham =

Ledsham may refer to either of two places in England:

- Ledsham, Cheshire
- Ledsham, West Yorkshire
