= Listed buildings in Mollington, Cheshire =

Mollington is a civil parish in Cheshire West and Chester, England. It contains ten buildings that are recorded in the National Heritage List for England as designated listed buildings, all of which are at Grade II. This grade is the lowest of the three gradings given to listed buildings and is applied to "buildings of national importance and special interest". Apart from the village of Mollington, the parish is rural. The listed buildings include houses, farmhouses, a farm building, a sundial, an icehouse, a guidepost, a canal bridge, and a railway viaduct.

Name and location	Photograph	Date	Notes
The Willows; 53.2293°N 2.9197°W	—	1684	This originated as a dower house, then became a farmhouse, and later a house. It is built in brick with a Welsh slate roof. The house has 2½ storeys, and a four-bay south front. The windows are sashes, the upper ones in half-dormers. There is an extension to the rear containing a dairy.
Mollington Grange; 53.2175°N 2.9179°W	—	Late 17th to early 18th century	A farmhouse with earlier origins, and later alterations. It is built in brick on a sandstone plinth and has a Welsh slate roof. The house is in 2½ storeys, and has a south front of four bays. There is a single-storey two-bay extension to the right. At the top of the building is a coped parapet. The windows are sashes.
Home Farmhouse; 53.2247°N 2.9213°W	—	c. 1700	There have been later alterations to the farmhouse, which is built in brick, partly on a sandstone plinth, and has a Welsh slate roof. It is in an L-shaped plan with 2½ storeys, and has a symmetrical five-bay front. In the first floor are casement windows, with mullioned and transomed windows above. The garden walls, in brick and sandstone, are included in the designation.
Barn, Willow Farm; 53.2295°N 2.9194°W	—	Early 18th century	There have been later alterations and additions. It is a long rectangular brick building with a corrugated asbestos roof. The building is in two storeys, and has an eleven- It contains various openings, pitch holes, and ventilation slots. A flight of external steps leads up to a door in a gabled dormer.
Crabwall Hall; 53.2185°N 2.9240°W	—	18th century	This originated as a country house. It was refaced in the early 19th century, and the interior was remodelled in about 1900. The building has since been converted into a hotel. It is constructed in brick with sandstone dressings, and has a Welsh slate roof. There are two storeys, and a symmetrical three-bay front. At the corners are octagonal tower, and in the centre is a two-storey porch. The porch and towers are castellated.
Sundial; 53.22932°N 2.91950°W	—	Late 18th century	The sundial is in the garden of The Willows. It is in sandstone, and consists of a baluster on a plinth with an octagonal capstone with a fluted frieze and an acanthus cornice. This carried an octagonal plate with a pierced gnomon.
Knoll's Bridge; 53.21689°N 2.90821°W	—	1793	An accommodation bridge (Canal bridge No. 131) crossing the Shropshire Union Canal. It was designed by Thomas Telford for the Ellesmere Canal Company. It is built in brick and consists of an elliptical arch with curving wing wall termination in plain pilasters. It has a plain parapet.
Icehouse; 53.2277°N 2.9150°W	—	Late 18th to early 19th century	The icehouse is constructed in brick and is set into an earth mound. A barrel vaulted passage leads to a circular chamber with a domed roof.
Railway viaduct 53.22841°N 2.90911°W		1839	The railway viaduct crosses the Shropshire Union Canal. It was designed by George Stephenson and John Dixon for the Chester and Birkenhead Railway Company. It is built in sandstone with brick vaulting. The main arch over the canal is built on the skew, and has rusticated voussoirs and keystones. On each side are arcades of five brick arches on stone piers.
Footpath guidepost 53.21553°N 2.91416°W	—	Late 19th century	The footpath guidepost consists of an octagonal cast iron post on a plinth, with a moulded cap and a ball finial. The finger plate has a raised inscription.

== See also ==
- Listed buildings in Capenhurst
- Listed buildings in Chester
- Listed buildings in Puddington
- Listed buildings in Saughall
- Listed buildings in Shotwick Park
- Listed buildings in Upton-by-Chester
