= Chorlton Hall, Backford =

Grade II listed country house in Cheshire, England

Coordinates: 53.23921°N 2.88914°W

Chorlton Hall is a country house to the east of the village of Backford, Cheshire, England.

It was formerly in the parish of Chorlton-by-Backford. The house was built probably in the middle of the 18th century. The original owners were the Stanley family of Hooton. In 1811 it was bought by the historian, George Ormerod, who wrote his History of Cheshire while living in the house. Ormerod sold the house in 1823 to the Wicksted family of Nantwich.

It was extended in 1845–46 by the architect Sir James Picton for James Wickstead Swan. The plan of the house is U-shaped. It is rendered with slate roofs and rendered chimney stacks. The house stands on a stone plinth and is in 2½ storeys. Its front is in three bays; the central bay has three windows, the lateral bays project forward, are gabled, and each has one window. Internally, the dining room is plastered in Jacobean style, and the drawing room in Gothic style. The house is recorded in the National Heritage List for England as a designated Grade II listed building.

== See also ==
- Listed buildings in Chorlton-by-Backford
