= Listed buildings in Capenhurst =

Capenhurst is a civil parish in Cheshire West and Chester, England. It contains three buildings that are recorded in the National Heritage List for England as designated listed buildings, all of which are at Grade II. This grade is the lowest of the three gradings given to listed buildings and is applied to "buildings of national importance and special interest". The listed buildings consist of a church, a pinfold, and a guidepost.

Name and location	Photograph	Date	Notes
Pinfold; 53.25722°N 2.95159°W		18th century (probable)	The pinfold is constructed in sandstone, and consists of a square enclosure with a gateway on the east side between simple gate piers.
Holy Trinity Church; 53.2574°N 2.9489°W		1856–59	The church was designed by James Harrison, and in 1889–90 the tower was added by John Douglas. The church is constructed in sandstone, and has a tiled roof. It consists of a nave with a south porch, a chancel, a vestry, and a west tower. On the top of the tower is a timber-framed stage and a broach spire covered in Lakeland slates.
Guidepost; 53.25471°N 2.96589°W	—	Late 19th century	The guidepost was erected for the Wirral Footpaths Preservation Society. It consists of an octagonal cast iron shaft with a moulded top and a ball finial. On the shaft is an inscription, and the fingerpost indicates the direction to Ledsham.

== See also ==
- Listed buildings in Backford
- Listed buildings in Ellesmere Port
- Listed buildings in Ledsham
- Listed buildings in Mollington
- Listed buildings in Puddington
