= Chorlton Hall, Malpas =

Country house in Cheshire, England

Chorlton Hall
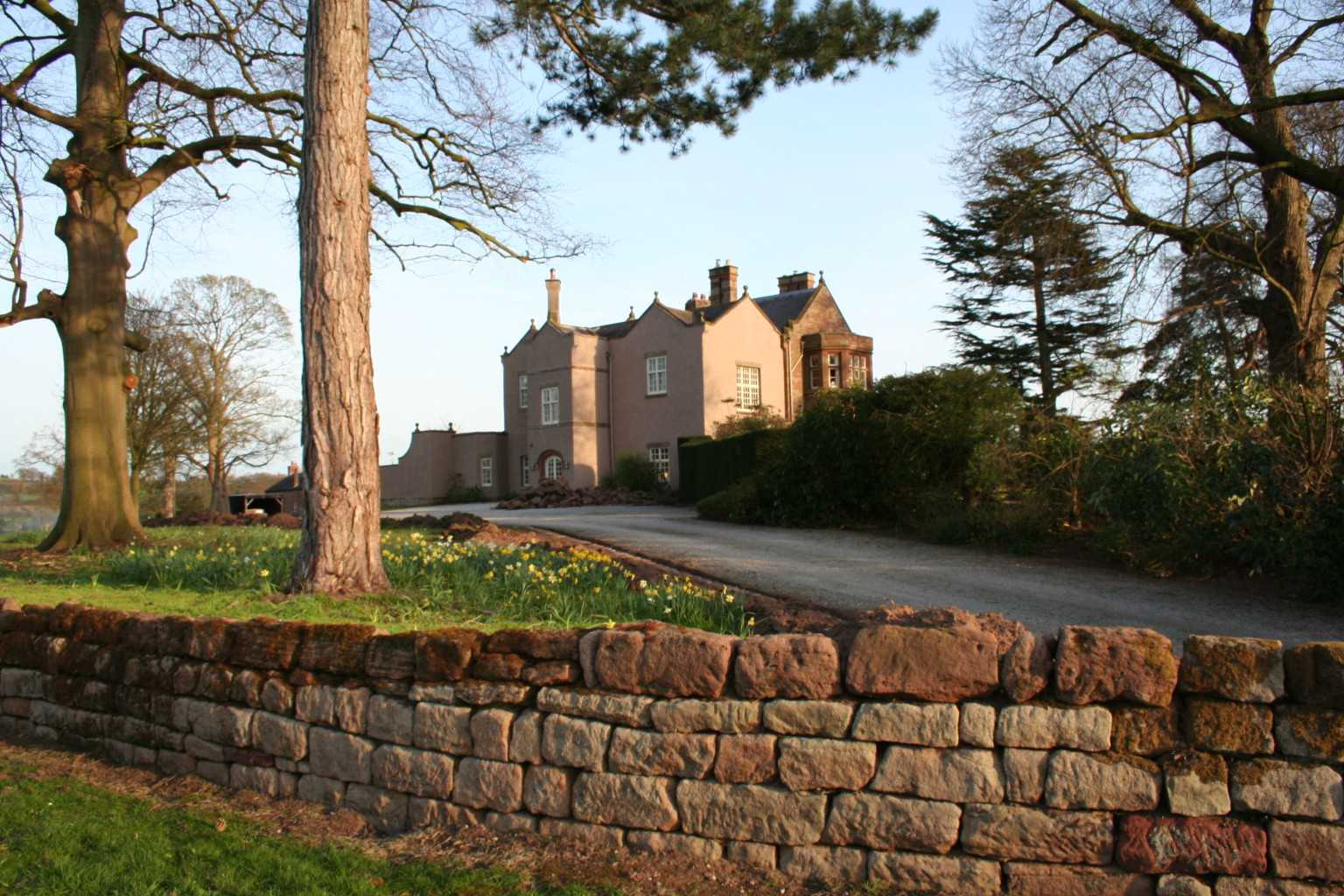
- Chorlton Hall in 2009

- Location within Cheshire
- 53.02887°N 2.79773°W
- Location: Chorlton, Cheshire West and Chester
- OS grid reference: SJ466483

History
- Built: 1664

Listed Building – Grade II
- Designated: 22 October 1952
- Reference no.: 1330593

Chorlton Hall is a country house in the parish of Chorlton, Cheshire, England, some 1.5 miles (2.4 km) northwest of Malpas. The house dates from the 17th century, with additions made in the second quarter of the 19th century. Its entrance front is pebbledashed and it stands on a stone plinth. The roof is slated. The house is in 2½ storeys plus cellars. Across the front are three bays, each with a gable, and with the central bay protruding. On the gables are ball finials. The porch has an ogee-arched entrance. The house is recorded in the National Heritage List for England as a designated Grade II listed building. A stable block and two cottages to the southeast of the house have also been designated at Grade II.

== Owners and residents ==
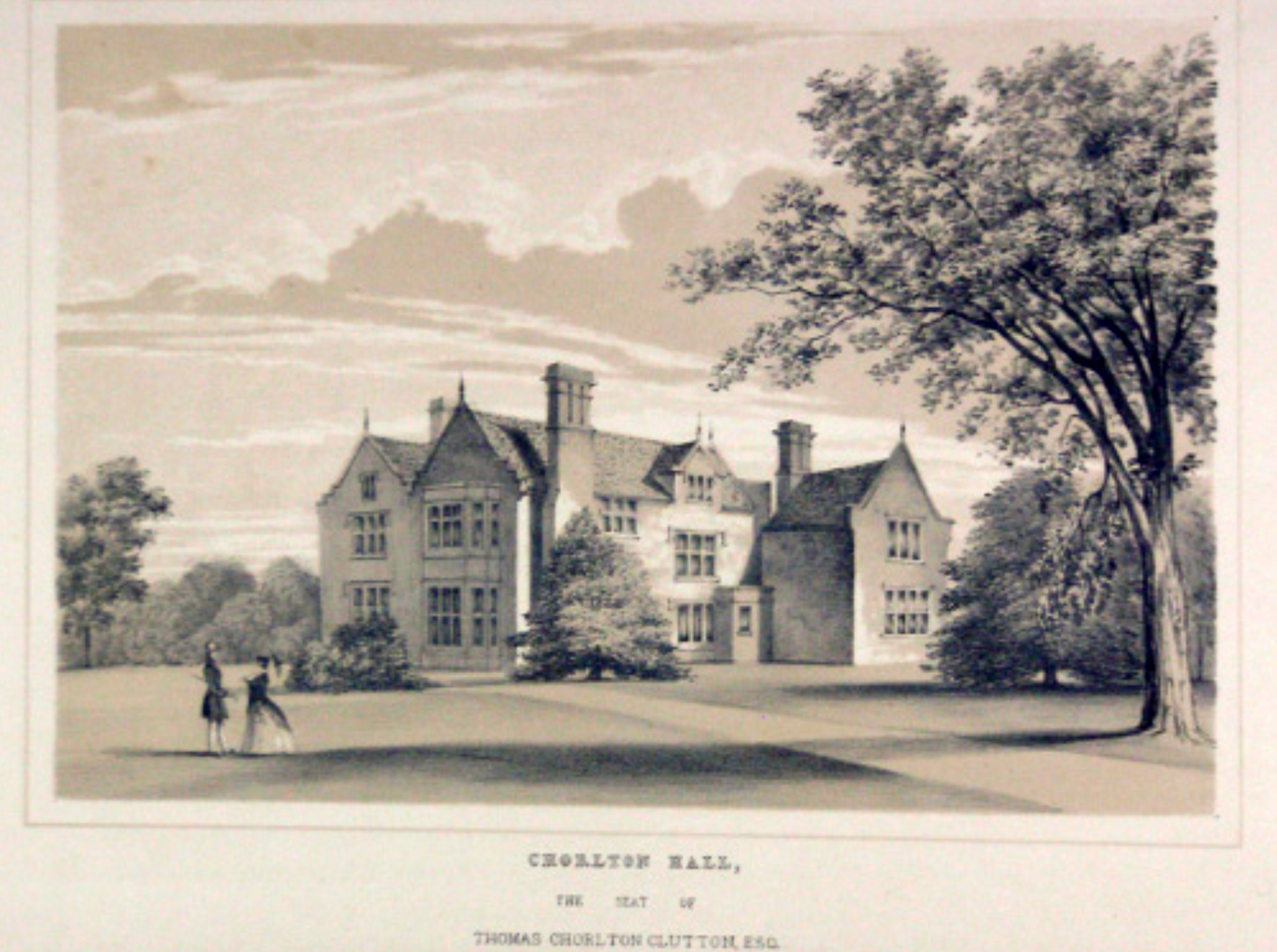
Engraving of Chorlton Hall in 1850

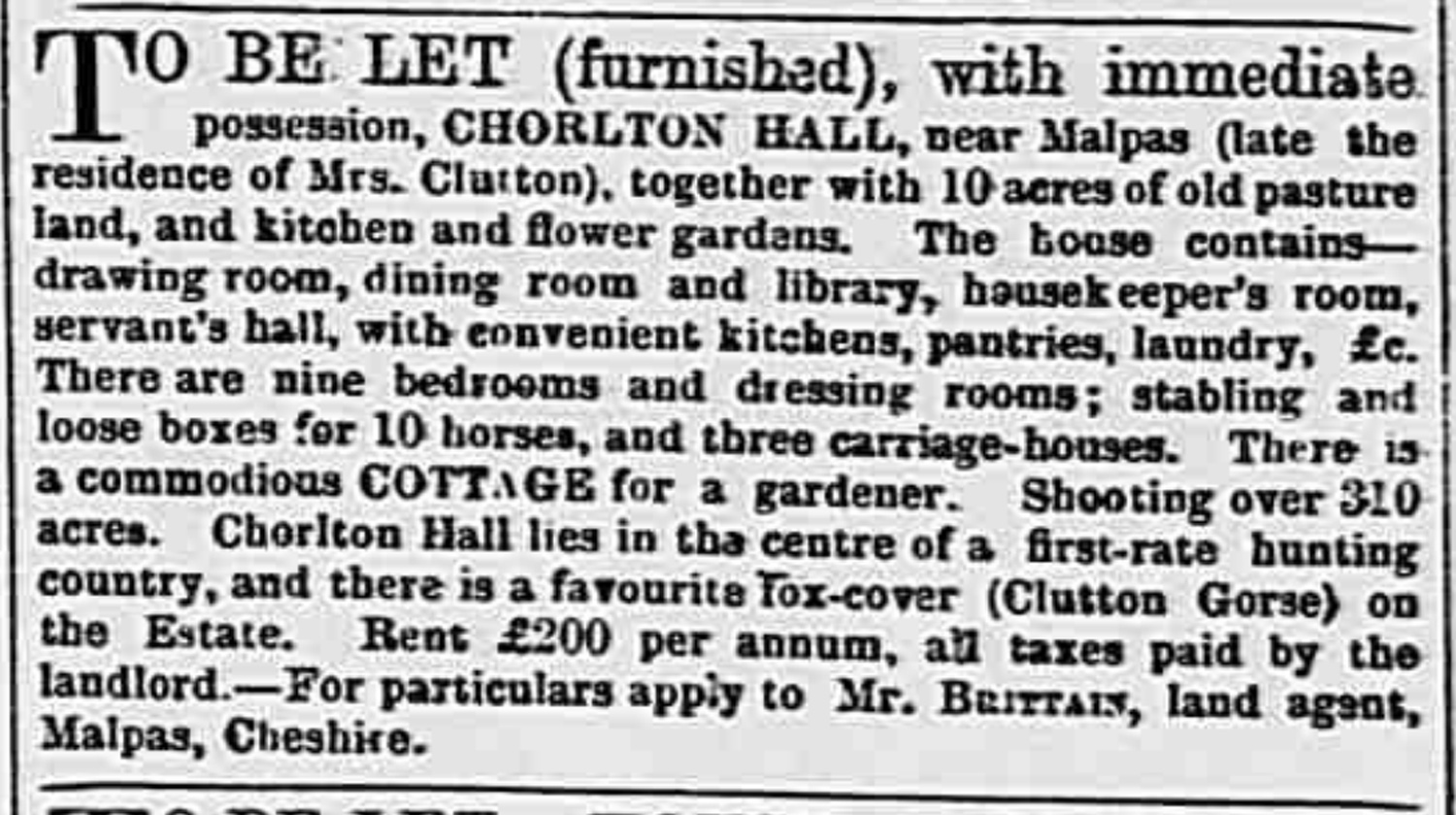
Rental notice for Chorlton Hall in 1868

The Hall was built in 1664 by the Clutton family, wealthy landowners who settled in Chorlton in the early 16th century. It was passed through successive generations until it was inherited by Richard Clutton (1715–1790). He married Mary Benyon, but the couple had no children, so when he died in 1790 Chorlton Hall was inherited by his nephew Thomas Chorlton Clutton.

Thomas Chorlton Clutton (1785–1863) was a magistrate and deputy lieutenant of Cheshire and Shropshire. In 1833 he married Frances Lewis, whose father was Edward Lewis of Malpas. However the couple had no children. In 1850 the historian Edward Twycross published a book called "The Mansions of England and Wales" in which an engraving of Chorlton Hall and information about its history was included. The engraving is shown.

When Thomas died in 1863 his wife Frances lived at the Hall until 1868. As the couple had no children, the property was inherited by her distant relative George Hamerton Crump (1802–1876). He married twice. His first wife was Martha Green, who died in 1843. His second wife was Harriet Fanny Maddock daughter and coheiress of Lieutenant Colonel Thomas Maddock of Edge, Cheshire. In 1868 the Hall was advertised to rent and the notice is shown. When George died in 1876 his eldest son by his first marriage, George Cresswell Crump (1836–1913), inherited the property. He was a pastoral pioneer in Australia and did not live at the Hall. When he died in 1913 his step-brother by his father's second marriage, Ernest Radclyffe Crump (1860–1923), inherited the property. When he died in 1923 the house was sold to Denis Haughton Bates.

Denis Haughton Bates (1886–1959) was the Chairman of the Cunard Line, which operated ocean liners, mainly across the north Atlantic. He was the son of Sir Edward Percy Bates, 2nd Baronet. In 1922, the year before he bought Chorlton Hall, he married Aline Mary Crook (1893–1974). The couple had two children, Philip and Denise, who were painted by the artist Frederick Samuel Beaumont when they were at Chorlton Hall. When Denis died in 1959 his wife Aline continued to live at the Hall until about 1970, when it was sold.

== See also ==
- Listed buildings in Chorlton, Cheshire West and Chester
