= Chorlton-by-Backford =

Area in Cheshire, England

Coordinates: 53.245°N 2.892°W

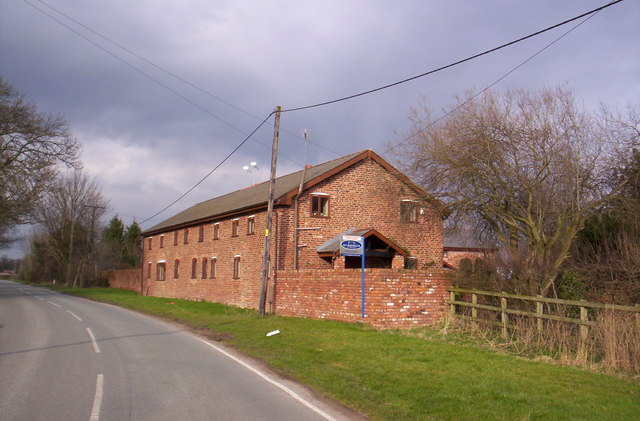
- Barn conversion at The Grove

- Location within Cheshire
- Population: 128 (2021 census)
- OS grid reference: SJ4072
- Civil parish: Backford
- Unitary authority: Cheshire West and Chester
- Ceremonial county: Cheshire
- Region: North West
- Country: England
- Sovereign state: United Kingdom
- Post town: CHESTER
- Postcode district: CH2
- Dialling code: 01244
- Police: Cheshire
- Fire: Cheshire
- Ambulance: North West
- UK Parliament: Chester North and Neston

Chorlton-by-Backford is a former civil parish, now in the parish of Backford, in the borough of Cheshire West and Chester and ceremonial county of Cheshire, England, approximately 3 mi (4.8 km) to the north of Chester. Chorlton Hall is a Grade II listed building within the area.

In 1848, it had a population of 85. In the 2001 census it had a population of 80, increasing to 124 at the 2011 census and 128 in 2021.

The name is likely derived from the Old English words ceorl (meaning a free peasant) and tūn (a farmstead or settlement).

Chorlton-by-Backford was formerly a township in the parish of Backford; in 1866 Chorlton by Backford became a separate civil parish; on 1 April 2015 the parish was abolished and merged with Backford.

== See also ==
- Listed buildings in Chorlton-by-Backford
- Chorlton, Cheshire West and Chester
