= Holy Trinity Church, Capenhurst =

Coordinates: 53.2573°N 2.9489°W

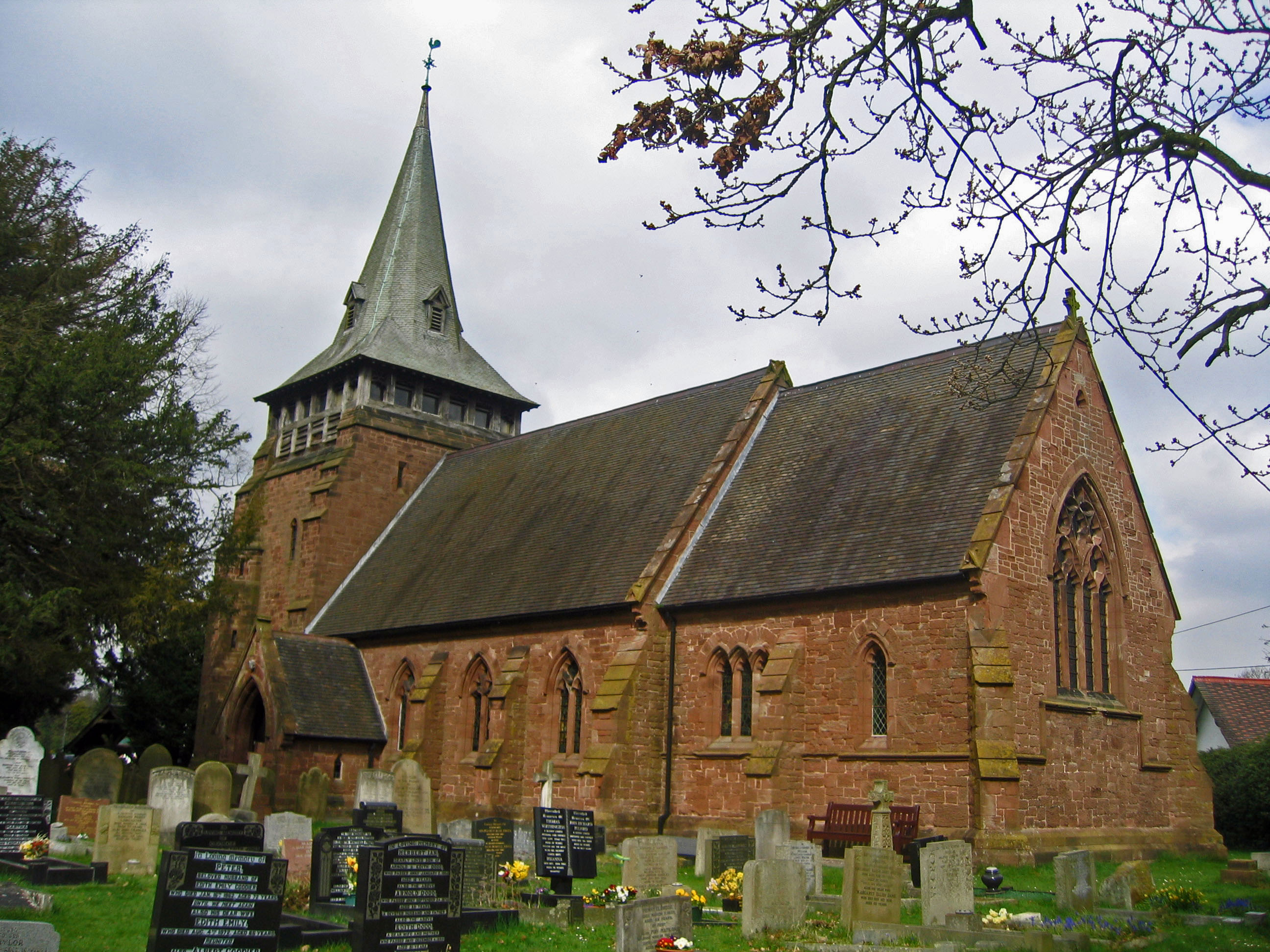
- Holy Trinity Church, Capenhurst, from the southeast

- Location in Cheshire
- OS grid reference: SJ 368,738
- Location: Capenhurst, Cheshire
- Country: England
- Denomination: Anglican
- Website: Holy Trinity, Capenhurst

History
- Status: Parish church
- Dedication: Trinity

Architecture
- Functional status: Active
- Heritage designation: Grade II
- Designated: 1 June 1967
- Architect(s): James Harrison, John Douglas
- Architectural type: Church
- Style: Gothic Revival
- Groundbreaking: 1856
- Completed: 1890

Specifications
- Materials: Sandstone, roof of purple tiles

Administration
- Province: York
- Diocese: Chester
- Archdeaconry: Chester
- Deanery: Wirral South
- Parish: Holy Trinity, Capenhurst

Clergy
- Bishop: Mark Tanner
- Vicar: Canon Revd Steven Mansfield

Holy Trinity Church, Capenhurst is in the village of Capenhurst, Cheshire, England. The church is recorded in the National Heritage List for England as a designated Grade II listed building. It is an active Anglican parish church in the diocese of Chester, the archdeaconry of Chester and the deanery of Wirral South. Its benefice is combined with that of St Oswald, Backford.

== History ==
The church was built between 1856 and 1859 to a design by James Harrison. In 1889–90 the tower was built and details were added to the interior by John Douglas.

== Architecture ==
=== Exterior ===
The church is built in red sandstone blocks with ashlar dressings. The roof is of purple tiles. Its plan consists of a four-bay nave, a south porch, a two-bay chancel, a vestry, and a west tower with spire. The tower is in three stages with buttresses and it has an octagonal stair turret at the southwest corner. On the west of the tower is a three-light window a clock above it. Around the top of the tower is a timber-framed stage which carries a broach spire with small Lakeland slates and a louvred lucarne.

=== Interior ===
Internally the reredos is of stone with panels on each side carved in the manner of medieval tiles with the Ten Commandments inscribed in Arts and Crafts style script. The stained glass in the church is all by Herbert Bryans, a pupil of Kempe, and is dated from 1876 to a date after 1900. There is a ring of six bells which were cast by John Taylor and Company in 1919.

== External features ==
The churchyard contains the war graves of two soldiers of World War I, and an airman of World War II.

== See also ==
- Listed buildings in Capenhurst
- List of works by James Harrison
- List of church restorations, amendments and furniture by John Douglas
