= Listed buildings in Ledsham, Cheshire =

Ledsham is a civil parish in Cheshire West and Chester, England. It contains seven buildings that are recorded in the National Heritage List for England as designated listed buildings, all of which are at Grade II. This grade is the lowest of the three gradings given to listed buildings and is applied to "buildings of national importance and special interest". Apart from the village of Ledsham, the parish is rural. The listed buildings consist of a country house and associated structures, a farmhouse, and two farm buildings.

Name and location	Photograph	Date	Notes
Barn, Court Farm; 53.2638°N 2.9656°W	—	Late 16th to early 17th century	The barn was re-walled in the early 19th century. It is built in brick on a red sandstone plinth, and has a corrugated iron roof. It has a rectangular plan, originally in three bays, later reduced to two. Inside are two full crucks.
Barn, Holly Bank Farm; 53.2631°N 2.9655°W	—	17th century or earlier	The barn is a linear building, basically timber-framed and later encased in brick. It has a corrugated iron roof. The structure includes four crucks.
Court Farmhouse; 53.2634°N 2.9658°W	—	Late 17th century	Alterations were made in the following two centuries. The farmhouse is built in brick with a Welsh slate roof. It has an L-shaped plan, is in two storeys with an attic, and has an east front of two bays. The windows are a mix of sashes and casements, with sliding sashes in the attic. Inside the house is an inglenook with a bressumer, and a domed bread oven.
Inglewood; 53.2745°N 2.9811°W		1909	A large country house, later converted into a training centre, then a hotel. It is in Vernacular Revival style, built mainly in timber framing, with some sandstone and brick, and with a Westmorland slate roof and seven tall chimneys. It has a rectangular plan with three fronts, and is in one and two storeys. Features include a gables porch with a ball finial, mullioned and mullioned and transomed windows, semicircular oriel windows, and some jettying.
Rose garden walls and gates, Inglewood; 53.27436°N 2.98178°W	—	c. 1915	The walls surround the rose garden to the west of the house, and were possibly designed by T. H. Mawson. The walls and gate piers are in brick with sandstone dressings. The piers have capstones and ball finials. The gateways on the west and south sides have wrought iron gates and an overthrow.
Terrace walls, Inglewood; 53.27430°N 2.98099°W	—	c. 1915	The walls run along the south and west sides of the terrace, and were possibly designed by T. H. Mawson. They are in red sandstone and consist of plain walls surmounted by a balustrade and plain piers with capstones. On each side of the terrace is a double flight of steps, which is also flanked by balustrades.
Terrace walls and pergola, Inglewood; 53.27461°N 2.98062°W	—	c. 1915	The walls run along the north, south and east sides of the east terrace, and were possibly designed by T. H. Mawson. They have openings with piers topped by ball finials. On the east side the opening is approached by four curving steps. Behind the junction of the south wall with the house is a York stone pergola with its own terrace and circular steps.

== See also ==
- Listed buildings in Capenhurst
- Listed buildings in Ellesmere Port
- Listed buildings in Puddington
