= Rake Hall =

Pub in Cheshire, England

Coordinates: 53.2581°N 2.8849°W

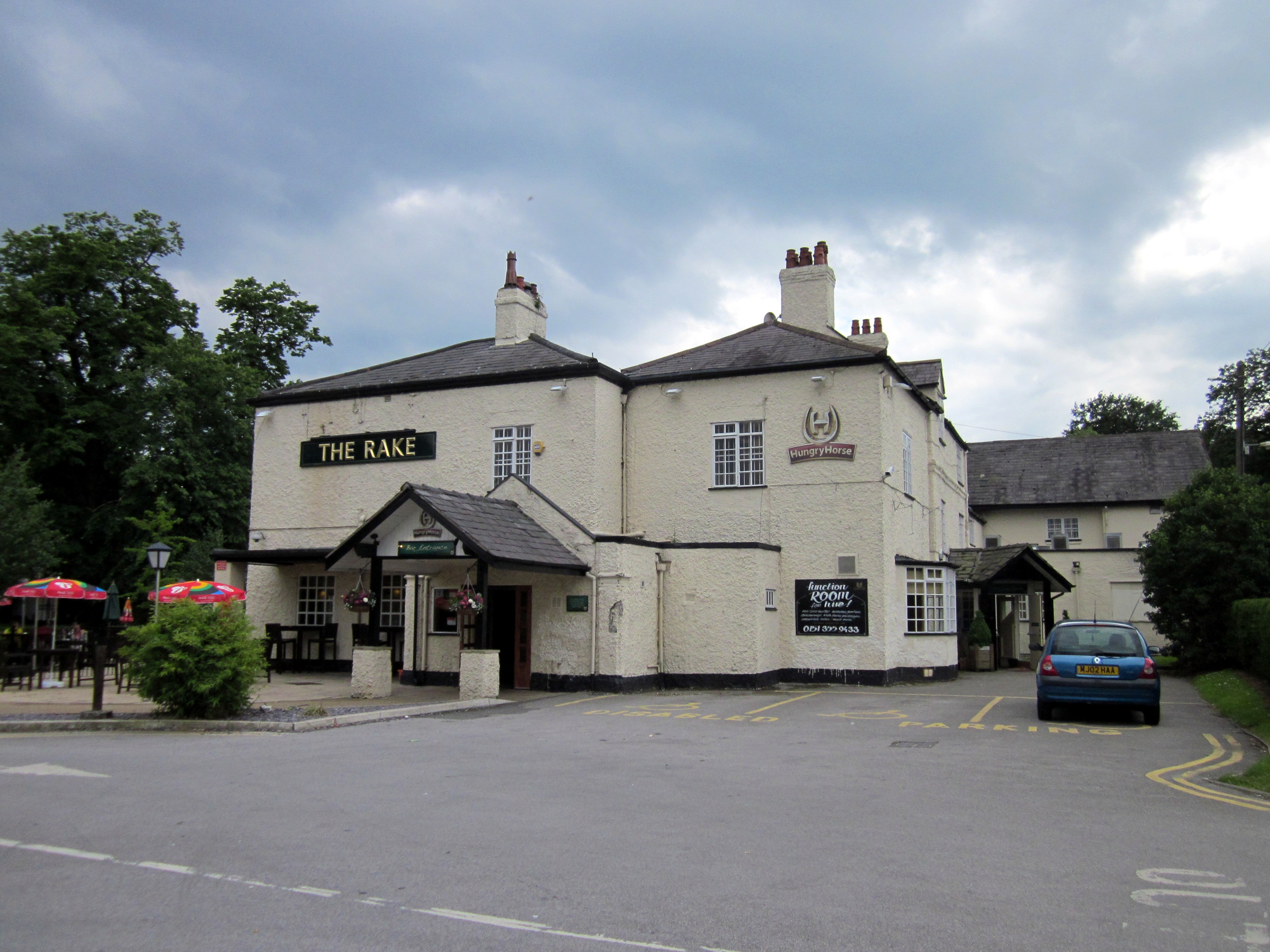
The Rake public house, originally Rake Hall

Rake Hall is in Rake Lane, Little Stanney, Cheshire, England. It originated as a country house, the home of the Bunbury family (may have been spelled Bunburries), and was later converted into a public house and restaurant. The house was built in the 17th century, and later altered and expanded. The building is constructed in pebbledashed brick with stone dressings on a rendered plinth and slate roofs. It is mainly in two storeys. Most of the windows are casements, with a dormer at the front, and an oriel window in a canted bay at the rear. Rake Hall is recorded in the National Heritage List for England as a designated Grade II listed building.
