= Ledsham railway station =

Former railway station in England

Coordinates: 53°16′48.24″N 2°57′59.19″W

Ledsham

General information
- Location: Ledsham, Cheshire; England
- Platforms: 4

Other information
- Status: Disused

History
- Original company: Chester and Birkenhead Railway
- Pre-grouping: Birkenhead Joint Railway
- Post-grouping: Birkenhead Joint Railway

Key dates
- 23 September 1840: Station opened
- 20 July 1959: Station closed
Location

Ledsham railway station was on the Chester and Birkenhead Railway near Little Sutton and about a mile from the hamlet of Ledsham on the Wirral Peninsula in Cheshire, England. The station was originally named 'Sutton' but renamed Ledsham on the opening of the Hooton to Helsby branch to avoid confusion with the newly built station named Little Sutton. The station opened on 23 September 1840 at the same time as the railway line, and was closed on 20 July 1959 due to a decline in passenger numbers.

In October 1839, Sutton was the scene of a serious riot. On completion of the works a gang of Irish navvies working from the Birkenhead end met with a gang of English & Welsh navvies working from the Chester end when the contractors' wages clerk for the Irish gang made off with the pay for his men. Violent fighting between the two gangs ensued over two days involving some 2,000 men; military were sent from Liverpool and Chester, including a piece of ordnance from Chester, and 28 rioters were jailed.

In 1891, the track from Ledsham Junction (half a mile south of the station) to Rock Ferry was quadrupled and Ledsham Station acquired four platforms. After the station closed the quadruple track was reduced to double in the 1970s. Two remaining platforms were in existence until the 1990s when they were demolished to accommodate a new road bridge which was built on the realignment of the A550. The double track through the station site now forms part of the Wirral Line to Chester, operated by Merseyrail.

== Services ==
Preceding station	Historical railways	Following station
Capenhurst; Line and station open	GWR & LNWR; Chester and Birkenhead Railway	Hooton; Line and station open
