= Arnold Wilkins =

British co-developer of radar (1907–1985)

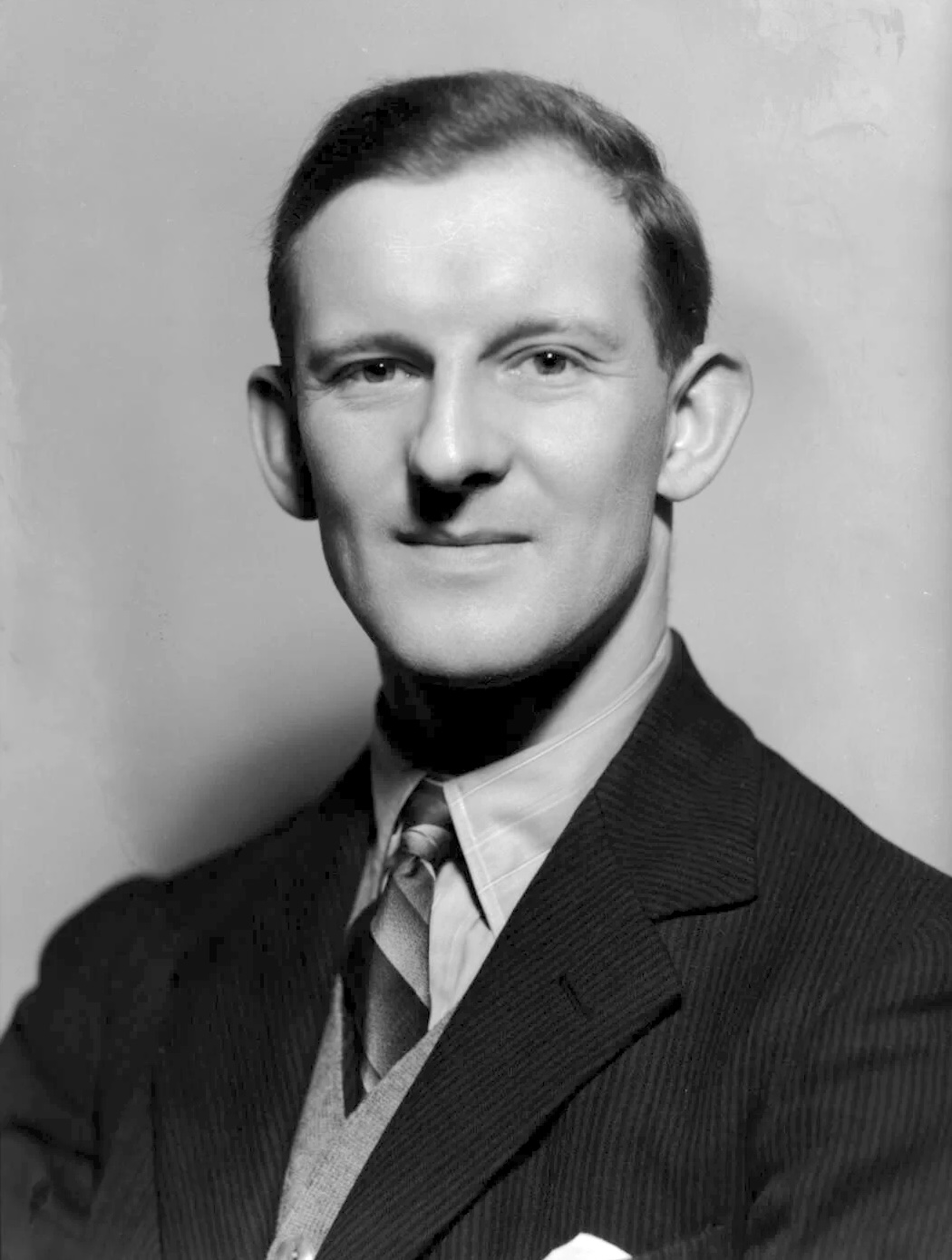
Arnold Wilkins carried out most of the theoretical and practical work that proved radar could work.

Arnold Frederic Wilkins OBE (20 February 1907 – 5 August 1985) was an English pioneer in developing the use of radar. It was Arnold Wilkins who suggested to his boss, Robert Watson-Watt, that reflected radio waves might be used to detect aircraft, and his idea led to the initial steps in developing ground-to-air radar in the UK. Wilkins also provided all the theoretical calculations to back-up his idea of aircraft detection, and it was his lashed-up system that he used in the Daventry Experiment to demonstrate that his idea would work. With the Daventry experiment, Wilkins successfully detected an aircraft (up to eight miles away) by reflection of radio waves for the first time in history.

== Early life ==
Born in Chorlton, Cheshire, Wilkins was the son of John Knowles Wilkins of Chester and was educated at Chester City & County School, Manchester University and St John's College, Cambridge.

== Career ==
=== Radar ===
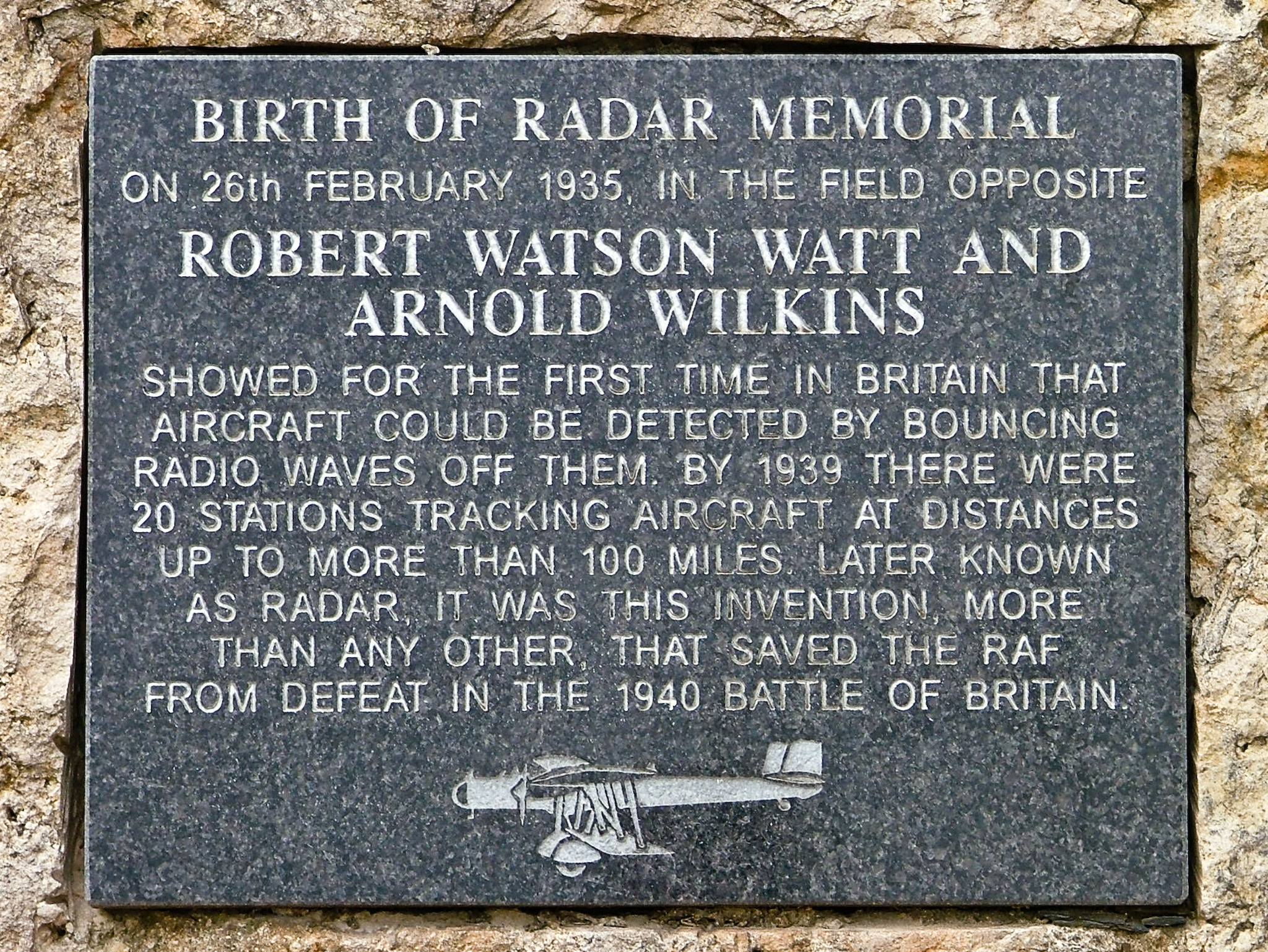
Closeup of memorial plaque

He was usually known as 'Skip' Wilkins and worked at the Radio Research Station (RRS) with Robert Watson-Watt. In an experiment on 26 February 1935 in a field in Northamptonshire at Stowe Nine Churches, Watson-Watt and Wilkins became the first to prove the possibility of radar. Known as the Daventry Experiment, this demonstration detected a Royal Air Force Heyford bomber aircraft at a distance of eight miles. In mid-May 1935, Wilkins left the Radio Research Station with a small party, including Edward George Bowen, to start further research at Orford Ness, an isolated peninsula on the coast of the North Sea. By June they were detecting aircraft at 27 km, which was enough for scientists and engineers to stop all work on competing sound-based detection systems. The successful results of the initial test led to the setting up of a research station that was to become the Telecommunications Research Establishment (TRE).

By the end of the year the range was up to 100 km, at which point plans were made in December to set up five stations covering the approaches to London by Watson-Watt and Sir Henry Tizard. Those stations opened in 1938 with the help of Wilkins and were further extended to the Chain Home system. In 1938, he helped to develop the British version of the Identification friend or foe (IFF) system.

After the war, he worked at the Radio Research Station in Buckinghamshire. He appeared in the 1977 TV Series The Secret War explaining his role in the discovery of radar, and is seen to reconduct the original Daventry Experiment alongside TV presenter William Woollard. Also in 1977, Wilkins wrote a personal account on the origins of radar, 'The Early Days of Radar in Great Britain', at the request of John Ashworth Ratcliffe, which is now held at Churchill Archives Centre, Cambridge.

== Personal life ==
He died in Saxtead, near Framlingham, Suffolk. His widow, Nancy, died in Framlingham in 2011. They are survived by three daughters.

== See also ==
- Alan Blumlein
- History of radar
- Aeronautical Research Committee (Tizard Committee)
