= Chorlton, Cheshire West and Chester =

Civil parish in Cheshire, England

Coordinates: 53.022°N 2.814°W

Chorlton
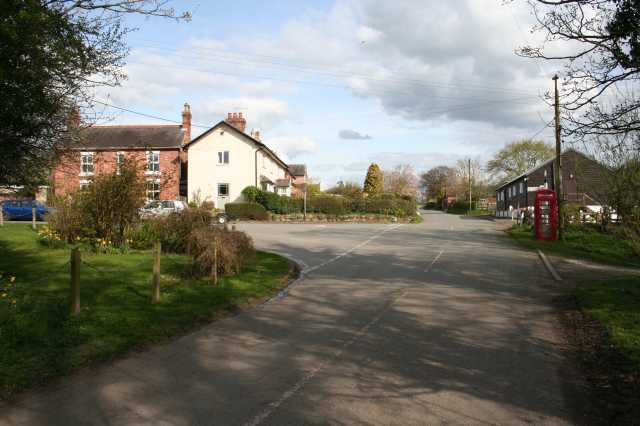
- Chorlton Lane

- Location within Cheshire
- Population: 124 (2011 census)
- OS grid reference: SJ4547
- Civil parish: Chorlton
- Unitary authority: Cheshire West and Chester
- Ceremonial county: Cheshire
- Region: North West
- Country: England
- Sovereign state: United Kingdom
- Post town: MALPAS
- Postcode district: SY14
- Dialling code: 01948
- Police: Cheshire
- Fire: Cheshire
- Ambulance: North West
- UK Parliament: Chester South and Eddisbury

Chorlton is a civil parish in the Borough of Cheshire West and Chester and ceremonial county of Cheshire, England. Situated to the west of the market town of Malpas, the main settlement in the parish is Chorlton Lane. Local landmarks Chorlton Hall (Grade II) and Chorlton Old Hall (Grade II*) are both listed buildings.

In 1848, it had a population of 150. In the 2001 census the civil parish had a population of 68, increasing to 124 at the 2011 census.

== Notable people ==
- George Daniels (1898 in Chorlton – 1995), football winger, played 47 games
- Arnold Wilkins (1907 in Chorlton – 1985), a pioneer in developing the use of radar

== See also ==
- Listed buildings in Chorlton, Cheshire West and Chester
- Chorlton-by-Backford
