= Listed buildings in Chorlton, Cheshire West and Chester =

Chorlton is a civil parish in Cheshire West and Chester, England. It contains four buildings that are recorded in the National Heritage List for England as designated listed buildings. The parish is rural, and all the listed buildings are domestic or related to farming.

== Key ==
| Grade | Criteria |
|---|---|
| Grade II* | Particularly important buildings of more than special interest. |
| Grade II | Buildings of national importance and special interest. |

== Buildings ==
| Name and location | Photograph | Date | Notes | Grade |
|---|---|---|---|---|
| Chorlton Hall; 53.0289°N 2.7977°W | | 1664 (?) | The house was modernised in about 1810 and enlarged in about 1840. It has a double pile plan, the front pile being the older part. The house is in 2 1/2 storeys with cellars, and has slate roofs. The front is pebbledashed on a stone plinth. It has three gabled bays, the central bay projecting and containing a porch. The gables are coped with ball finials. The rear pile is in sandstone, and has gables that are partly crowstepped with ball finials. The windows are casements. | II |
| Chorlton Old Hall; 53.0283°N 2.8076°W | | 1666 | Additions and alterations have been made to the country house since it was first built. It is constructed in brick and has a slate roof. The house is in 2 1/2 storeys, and has a T-shaped plan. The front has four bays, of which the right hand bay and the entrance bay project forward, and have shaped gables. The other two bays contain dormers. The rest of the windows are casements. | II* |
| Stables and cottages Chorlton Hall; 53.0286°N 2.7969°W | | c. 1810 | These form an L-shaped plan, and are in brick with slate roofs. In the stable are five stable doors, an archway and six pitch holes. Adjoining the stables are two cottages. These are each in a single bay, and have two storeys. The windows are casements. | II |
| Chorlton Lodge; 53.0247°N 2.8122°W | — | 1825 | The house is constructed in brick on a rendered plinth. It has a slated roof with ridge tiles. The central part of the house is in two storeys and three bays. On each side is a single-storey wing, and at the rear is a two-storey wing. The central doorcase has fluted pilasters and an open pediment. The windows are sashes. | II |
