= Inglewood, Cheshire =

Country house in Ledsham, Cheshire, England

Coordinates: 53.27456°N 2.98108°W

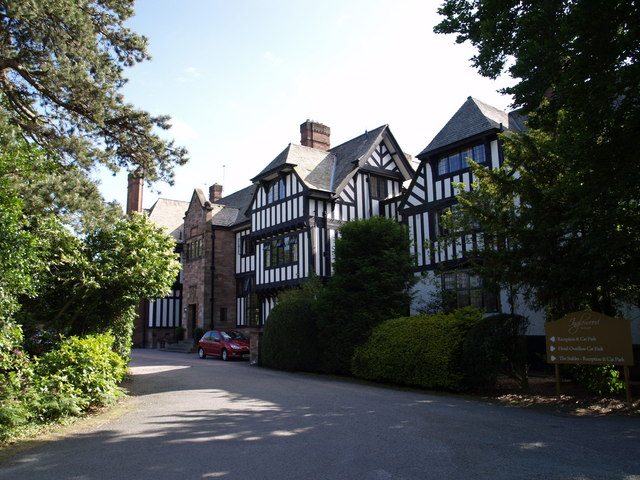
Inglewood

Inglewood is a house to the north-west of the village of Ledsham, Cheshire, England. It was built in 1909, but is dated 1915. The house was built for Frederick H. Fox, a Liverpool millionaire who made his fortune in marine insurance. It was later one of the seats of the Gordon family. As of 2011 it is a hotel called Inglewood Manor Hotel. The house is mainly half-timbered, with stone dressings, and brick chimneys decorated with diapering. It is roofed with Lakeland slate. Its architectural style is late Arts and Crafts. The house has a rectangular plan, with three fronts in two and three storeys. The entrance is on the east front, which has eight bays; the south and west fronts each have five bays. On the south side is a balcony overlooking the gardens. The house is recorded in the National Heritage List for England as a designated Grade II listed building. Also listed Grade II are the south and west terrace walls of the garden, and the east terrace walls and a pergola.

== See also ==
- Listed buildings in Ledsham, Cheshire
