= Chorlton Old Hall =

Country house in Cheshire, England

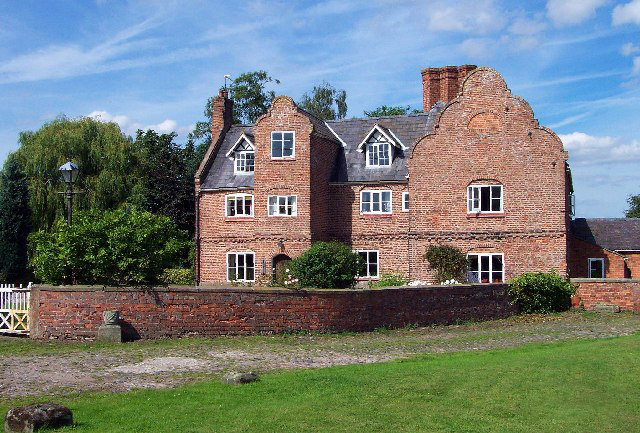
- Chorlton Old Hall

- Location of Chorlton Old Hall in Cheshire
- 53.02833°N 2.80757°W
- Location: Chorlton, Cheshire West and Chester

History
- Built: 1666

Listed Building – Grade II*
- Designated: 1 March 1967
- Reference no.: 1330594

Chorlton Old Hall is a country house in the parish of Chorlton, Cheshire, England. The house was built in 1666, with later additions and alterations. It is constructed in red-brown brick, and has slate roofs. The house has a T-shaped plan. It formerly had an E-plan, but one wing has been demolished. The house is in 2½ storeys and its entrance front has four bays. The right-hand bay projects and has a shaped gable. The second bay is the entrance bay; this also projects and has a shaped gable, but is smaller. Dormer windows have been inserted in the roof in the first and third bays. The house is recorded in the National Heritage List for England as a designated Grade II* listed building.

== See also ==
- Grade II* listed buildings in Cheshire West and Chester
- Listed buildings in Chorlton, Cheshire West and Chester
