= Stoak =

Village in Cheshire, England

Coordinates: 53.253°N 2.867°W

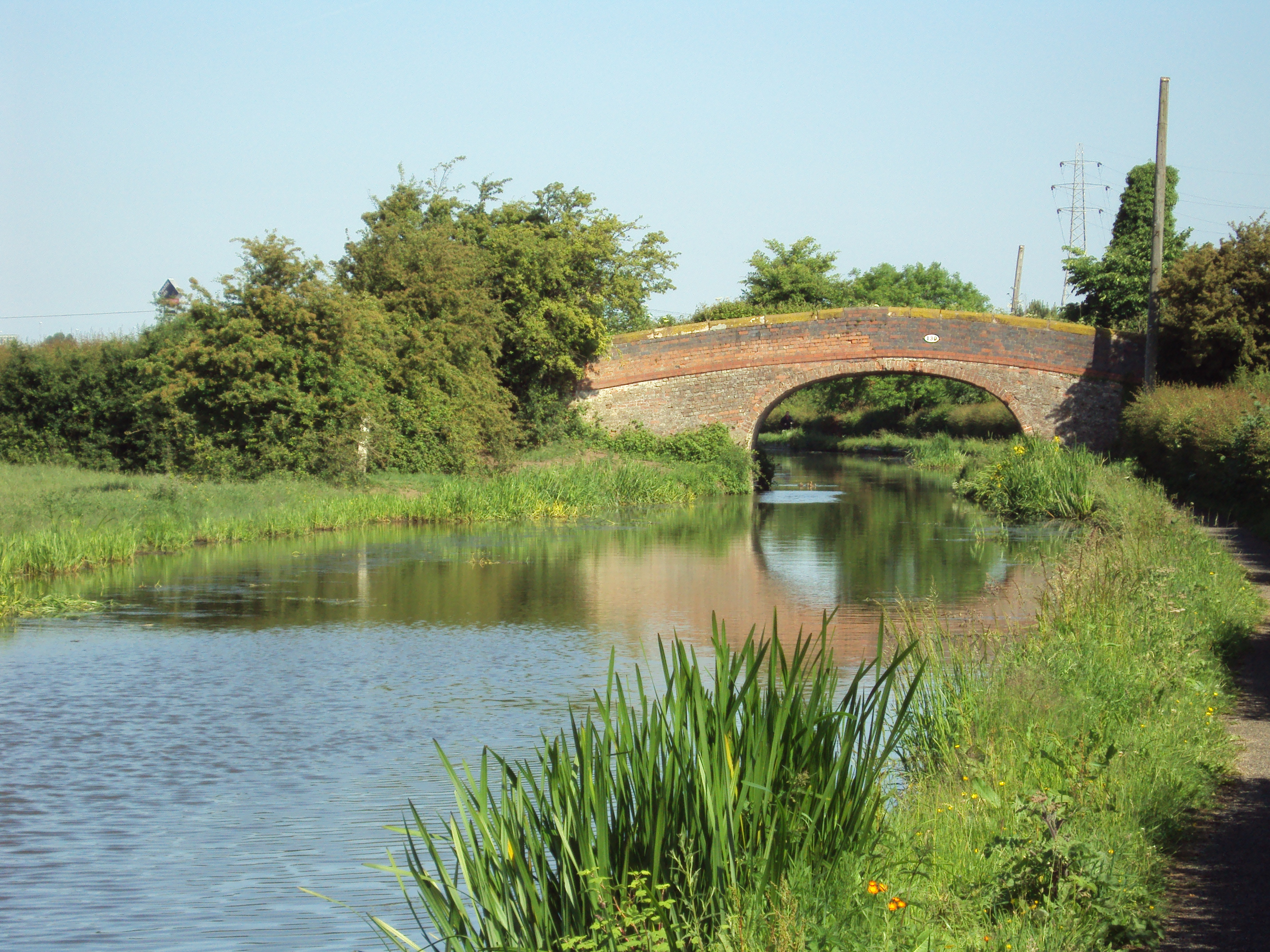
- Bridge 139 (Meadow Lane Bridge), Shropshire Union Canal, near Stoak

- Location within Cheshire
- Population: 171 (2011)
- OS grid reference: SJ421731
- Civil parish: Stoak
- Unitary authority: Cheshire West and Chester
- Ceremonial county: Cheshire
- Region: North West
- Country: England
- Sovereign state: United Kingdom
- Post town: CHESTER
- Postcode district: CH2
- Dialling code: 01244
- Police: Cheshire
- Fire: Cheshire
- Ambulance: North West
- UK Parliament: Runcorn and Helsby

Stoak is a small village and civil parish in the unitary authority of Cheshire West and Chester; and the ceremonial county of Cheshire, England.

Within the parish, to the west of the village is the intersection of the M53 and M56 Motorways, and to its east the Shropshire Union Canal.

The population of the parish as taken at the 2011 census was 171. The name of the parish was changed from the previous Stoke on 1 April 2015 after a review of town and parish councils in the Cheshire West and Chester unitary authority. The parish should not be confused with a different Cheshire parish called Stoke, in Cheshire East.

The parish church in the village, St Lawrence's Church, is a Grade II* listed building.

== See also ==
- Listed buildings in Stoak
