= Backford Hall =

Grade II listed English country house in the United Kingdom

Coordinates: 53.24054°N 2.90311°W

Backford Hall is a country house in the village of Backford, Cheshire, England. It was built in the mid 19th Century on the site of earlier halls, and was designed by John Cunningham. Its style is described as "exuberant Elizabethan, Jacobean and Bohemian Rococo".

Since 1946 it has been used as offices by Cheshire County Council, and in 2012 its sale was agreed for residential development if planning approval was granted. Planning permission was granted in 2014 and the first residents moved into one of the new houses in 2016. The house is recorded in the National Heritage List for England as a designated Grade II listed building.

== History ==
Backford Hall was built by Lieutenant Colonel Edward Holt Glegg (1809-1877) of the Rifle Brigade. The foundation stone for was laid in 1848. In June 1849 when the building was in progress a dinner for the workmen was held in a farmhouse on the estate. This was described in the local newspaper at that time. They said that the foundation stone had been laid in June of the previous year and that John Cunningham was the architect. They also made the following comment about the Hall.

"It is a beautiful specimen of the ornamental Elizabethan style and admirably built and is expected to be ready for the reception of the family in May or June next year."

Lieutenant Colonel Edward Holt Glegg was a member of a wealthy land owning family. Besides Backford estate the Gleggs owned large areas in Irbie. A full account of the family is given in the book called “The Mansions of England and Wales” In 1845 he married Margaret Maxwell Logan who was the daughter of John Maxwell Logan of Fingalton.

Edward inherited the Backford Estate when his elder brother died in 1843. He built the new Hall on the site of an 18th Century old hall which he demolished. When he died in 1877 his eldest son Birkenhead Glegg (1848-1914) inherited the house. He did not marry. The 1881 Census records him living at the Hall with his mother, Margaret and his brother, Edward as well seven servants including a butler and footman.

When Birkenhead Glegg died in 1914 his brother Edward Maxwell Glegg (1849-1927) inherited the Hall. He married in 1904 at the age of 55 but the couple had no children. When he died in 1927 the house was inherited by a distant relative Lettice Valentine Lee Townshend She did not live at the Hall but instead rented it to various tenants one of which was a country club. In 1945 it was sold to Cheshire County Council.

== See also ==
- Listed buildings in Backford
