= Backford =

Coordinates: 53.2419°N 2.9031°W

- Village
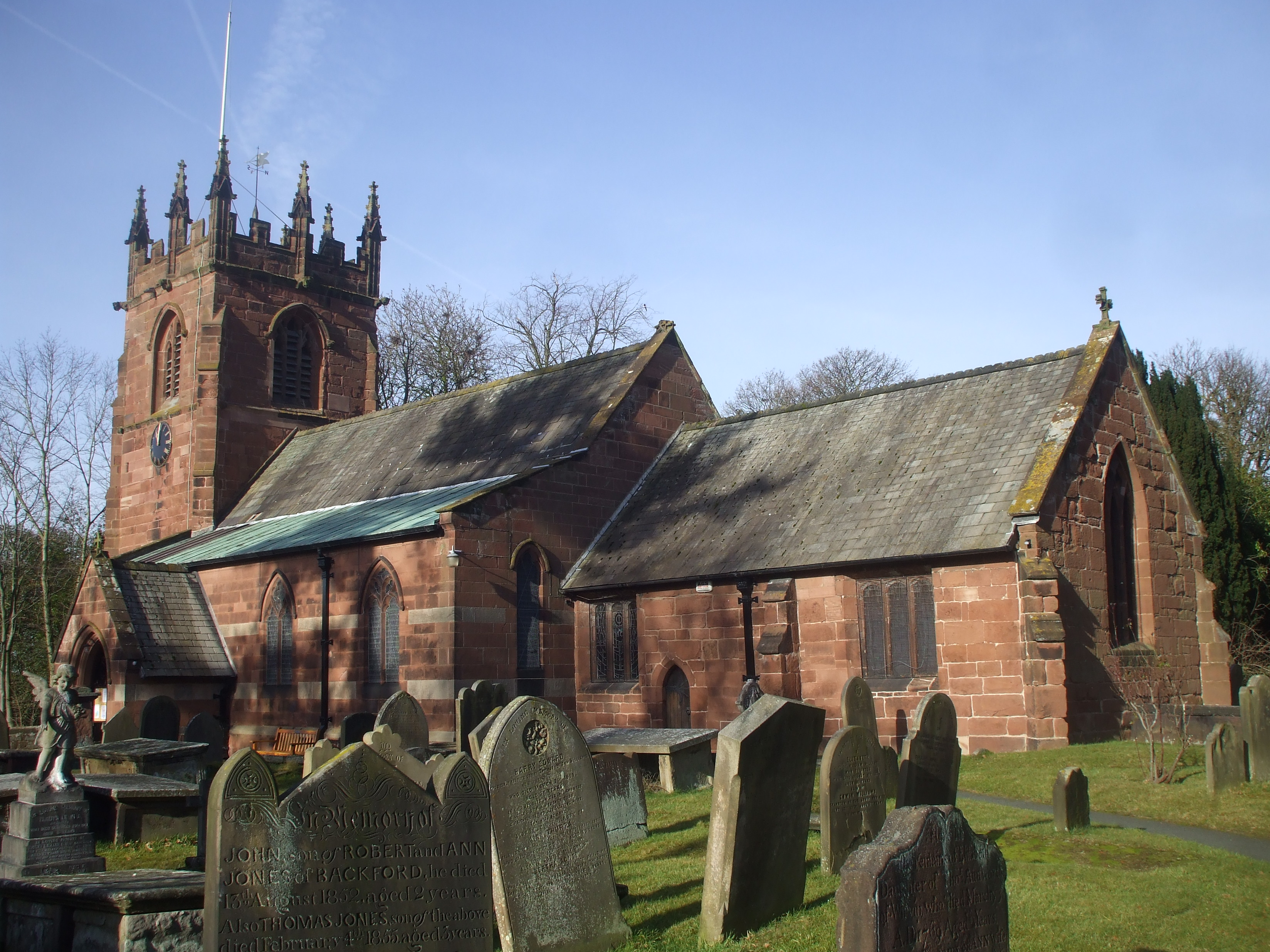
- St. Oswald's Church, Backford

- Location within Cheshire
- Population: 117 (2011 census)
- OS grid reference: SJ398720
- Civil parish: Backford
- Unitary authority: Cheshire West and Chester
- Ceremonial county: Cheshire
- Region: North West
- Country: England
- Sovereign state: United Kingdom
- Post town: CHESTER
- Postcode district: CH2
- Dialling code: 01244
- Police: Cheshire
- Fire: Cheshire
- Ambulance: North West
- UK Parliament: Chester North and Neston

Backford is a village and civil parish in the unitary authority of Cheshire West and Chester and ceremonial county of Cheshire, England. It lies between Chester and Ellesmere Port on the A41 trunk road, north of the Shropshire Union Canal. Backford Cross is about 1 1/4 miles (2.0 km) to the north west, the village of Mollington is approximately 1 mile (1.6 km) to the west and the hamlet of Croughton is about 1 mile (1.6 km) to the east.

According to the 2011 census, the parish had a population of 117. Formerly a township in the Wirral Hundred, its population was 138 in 1801, 155 in 1851, 141 in 1901, 119 in 1951 and 109 at the 2001 census. In 2024, the population was 479. The neighbouring civil parish of Chorlton-by-Backford was added to Backford in 2015.

St Oswald's Church is in the centre of the village, as is Backford Hall, which is a Grade II listed building. Until its sale for residential redevelopment in 2012, Backford Hall had operated as offices for Cheshire West and Chester Council. Its grounds were used as a golf course by the now-defunct Backford Hall Golf Club from the late 1930s until 1950.

== See also ==
- Listed buildings in Backford
- Chorlton Hall, Backford
