= Edward Reginald Frampton =

English painter

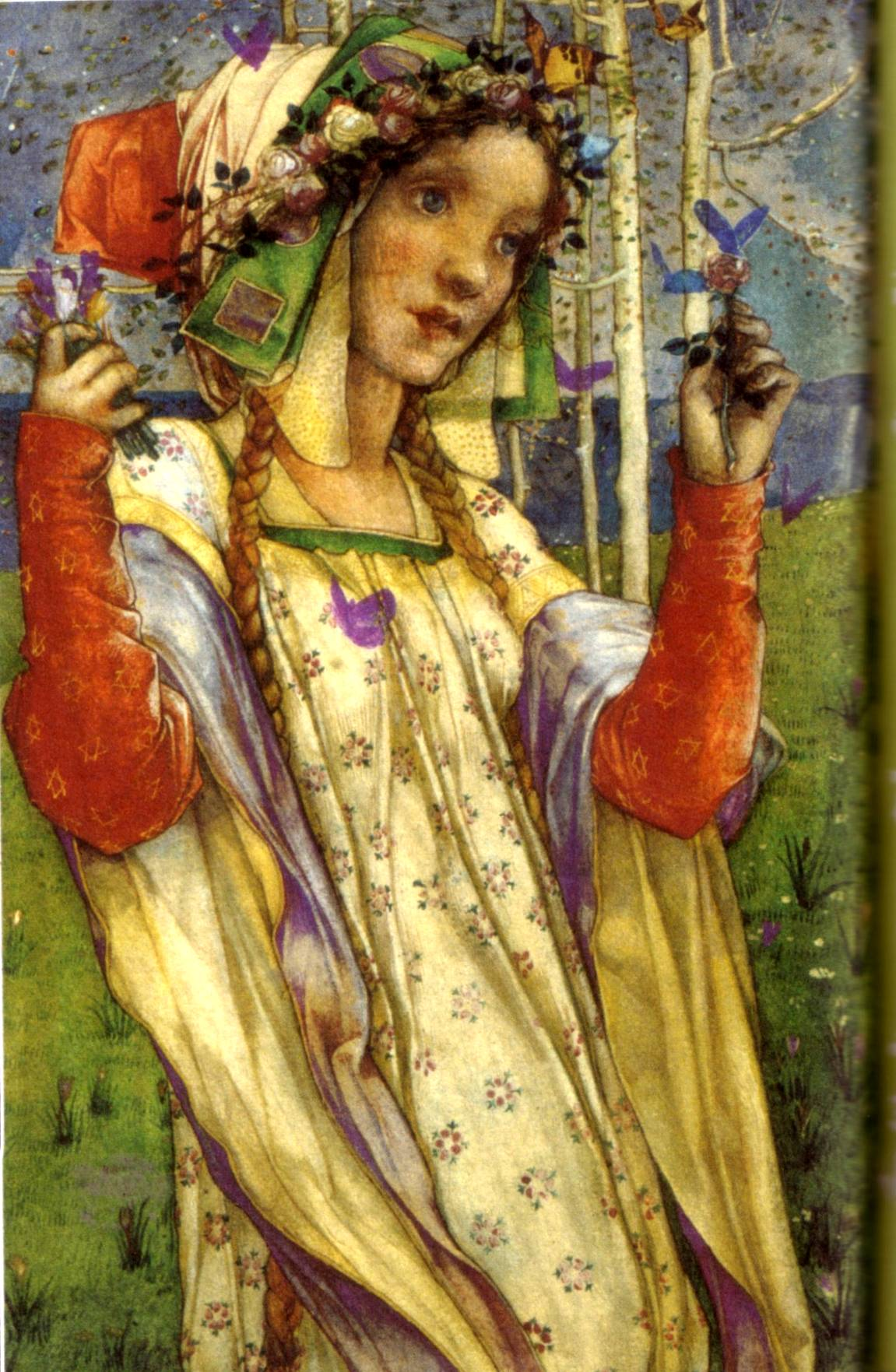
Fairy Land, by Edward Reginald Frampton

Edward Reginald Frampton (1870 – 4 November 1923) was a British painter who specialized in murals, specifically war memorials at churches. He painted in a flat, stately style, and was influenced by French Symbolism. He also worked in stained glass, most probably learning from his father, Edward Frampton, who was a stained-glass artist. His work usually depicted symbolic subjects and landscapes; early in his career he made sculpture.

== About ==
Early in his career he devoted himself to landscape painting; after a lengthy stay in France and Italy, and after seeing an exhibition of the collected works of Sir Edward Burne-Jones he chose to concentrate on illustrating the human form. All his larger and more important compositions have been figure subjects. Frampton considered himself to have been influenced both by primitive Italian painting and the English Pre-Raphaelite design, and also by the compositions of Pierre Puvis de Chavannes.

Frampton died in Paris on 4 November 1923.

A notable feature of much of the artist's painting is the almost total absence of high lights and cast shadows. Such a mode of treatment, in the hands of a less capable draughtsman, might well produce a painful impression of feebleness or lack of definition. Not so, however, in the case of Mr. Frampton. With him, indeed, this diffused illumination is a matter of deliberate purpose. He adopts a subdued tone from a sense of decorative fitness, his aim being to ensure the flat effect and the subordination proper to mural backgrounds, as distinct from the meretricious illusion of prominent relief and receding distances, which disqualifies the average easel- picture from a place in any broad architectonic scheme. Mr. Frampton's compositions, on the contrary, are instinct with a restful and dignified serenity, no less satisfying than transcendental.

As typical of this phase of his work may be mentioned a large panel depicting a scene from the legend of St. Brendan. The incident is one with which all readers of Matthew Arnold's poems must be familiar—to wit, St. Brendan encountering Judas Iscariot on the iceberg. The quality of this picture recalls a forgotten chef- d'œuvre of Spencer Stanhope's, viz. The Waters of Lethe. The twilight atmosphere is the same in both cases, but there is this difference, that Mr. Frampton surpasses the deceased artist in technical mastery of "echo".
