= Capenhurst =

Coordinates: 53.258°N 2.950°W

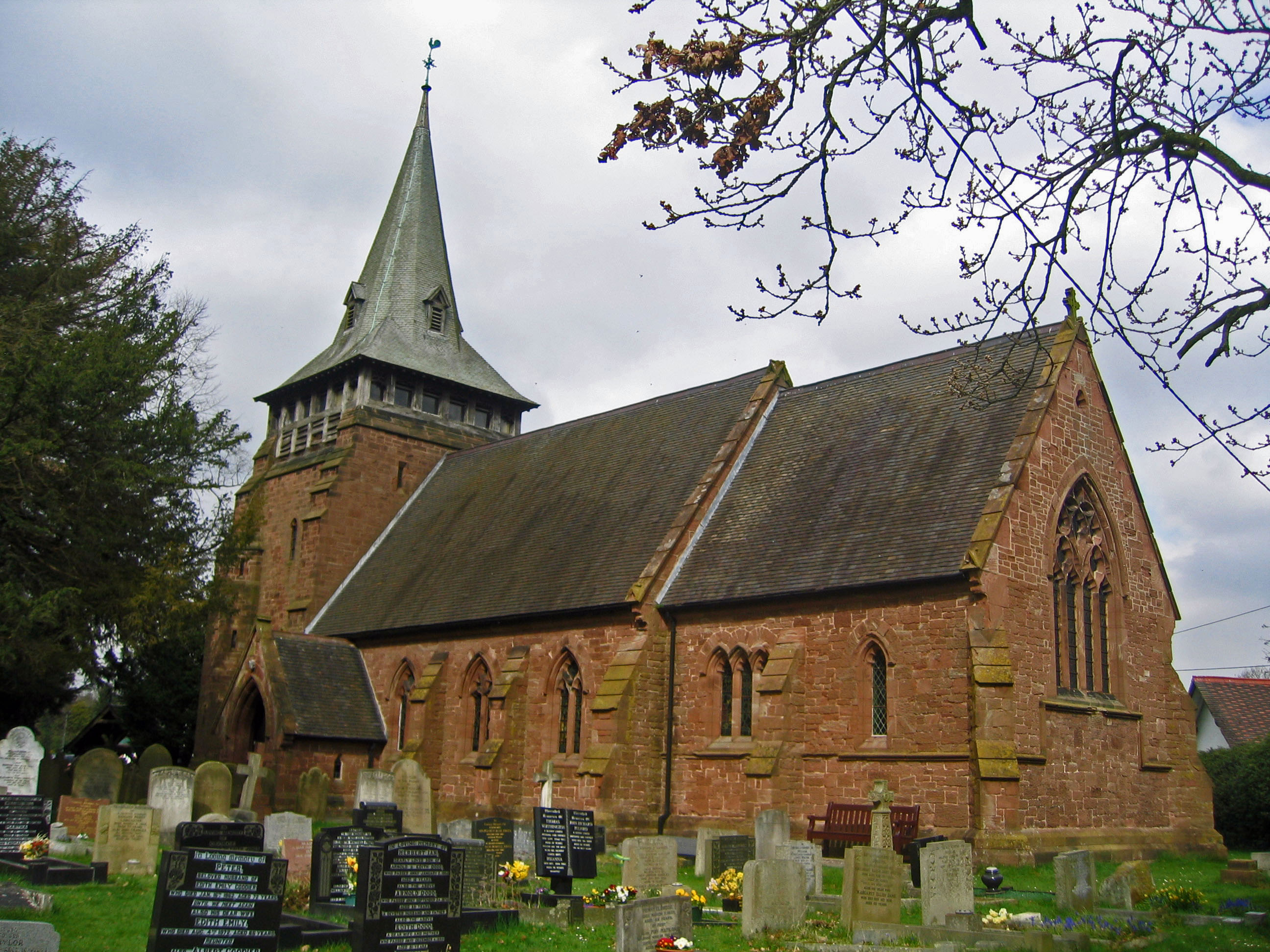
- Holy Trinity Church, Capenhurst

- Location within Cheshire
- Population: 380 (2011 Census)
- OS grid reference: SJ366739
- Civil parish: Capenhurst
- Unitary authority: Cheshire West and Chester
- Ceremonial county: Cheshire
- Region: North West
- Country: England
- Sovereign state: United Kingdom
- Post town: CHESTER
- Postcode district: CH1
- Dialling code: 0151
- Police: Cheshire
- Fire: Cheshire
- Ambulance: North West
- UK Parliament: Chester North and Neston

Capenhurst is a village and civil parish in the unitary authority of Cheshire West and Chester and the ceremonial county of Cheshire, England. It is two miles south west of Ellesmere Port, at the southern end of the Wirral Peninsula.

According to the 2011 Census, Capenhurst had a population of 380.

== History ==
Capenhurst was known as ‘Capeles’ at the time of the Domesday Book of 1086.

Capenhurst was a township in Shotwick Parish of the Wirral Hundred and included parts of the hamlets of Dunkirk and Two Mills. The population was 147 in 1801, 148 in 1851, 159 in 1901, 253 in 1951 and 237 in 2001.

== Detail ==
Capenhurst is home to a uranium enrichment plant owned by Urenco Group. A new Tails Management Facility was commissioned in 2018. In 2025, infrastructure company Costain Group was contracted to upgrade the plant's infrastructure, which will enable establishing Europe's first high-assay low-enriched uranium (HALEU) enrichment facility.

Adjacent, but separate from this is the Capenhurst Technology Park. This contains EA Technology, (previously the Electricity Council Research Centre prior to privatisation of the UK electricity supply industry), and other spin-off companies.

Capenhurst village has its own railway station, on the Wirral Line of the Merseyrail network.

The local amateur football team, Capenhurst Villa, play in the Carlsberg West Cheshire League. The local Rugby Union team play in the HALBRO Division 3 West league and now has a thriving junior section. The village also has a cricket club consisting of two Saturday sides that currently play in Div 3 (1st XI) & 5W (2nd XI) of the Cheshire Cricket Alliance. All three sports teams share the Capenhurst Sports Fields and Pavilion.

== Capenhurst tower ==
In 1999 the journalist Duncan Campbell published claims that a 50-metre-high (160 ft) tower on the premises of the uranium enrichment plant had been used to intercept telephone calls transmitted by microwave between the British Telecom towers at Gwaenysgor, Clwyd, and Pale Heights, near Chester. Campbell claimed that the interception was conducted by the Government Communications Headquarters (GCHQ), initially from a temporary installation on the roof of the plant until commissioning of the tower in 1990.

The main route for phone calls between Ireland and the United Kingdom was via the submarine fibre optic cable UK-Ireland 1, landed at Holyhead, Anglesey, then transmitted by a microwave link. Campbell claimed that calls were monitored by GCHQ until 1998 when the Irish telecommunication system was changed.

The tower was demolished in 2004.

== See also ==
- Listed buildings in Capenhurst
- Holy Trinity Church, Capenhurst
