= Crabwall Manor =

Country house in Mollington, Cheshire, England

Coordinates: 53.21841°N 2.92400°W

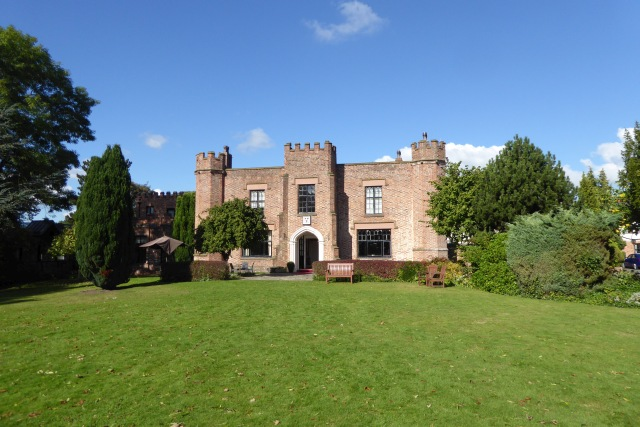
Crabwell Manor hotel (2016)

Crabwall Manor (original name Crabwall Hall) is a former country house, later a hotel, in the village of Mollington, Cheshire, England. The present building dates from the 18th century. It replaced an early 17th-century house built for the Gamul family. The house was originally a "modest brick cottage" and it was refaced in the early 19th century. Figueirdo and Treuherz comment that this give it "the appearance of a toy fort". The interior was remodelled in about 1900. It has since been converted into a hotel, with extensions added in 1987. It is constructed in orange and yellow brick with red sandstone dressings. The roof is in Welsh slate and there are three brick chimneys. The building is in two storeys, with an entrance front of three bays. At the corners are octagonal towers. The central bay protrudes and forms a two-storey porch; it is supported by diagonal buttresses. The tops of the porch and towers are crenellated. The building is recorded in the National Heritage List for England as a designated Grade II listed building.

== See also ==
- Listed buildings in Mollington, Cheshire
