= Wervin =

Village in Cheshire, England

Coordinates: 53.241°N 2.866°W

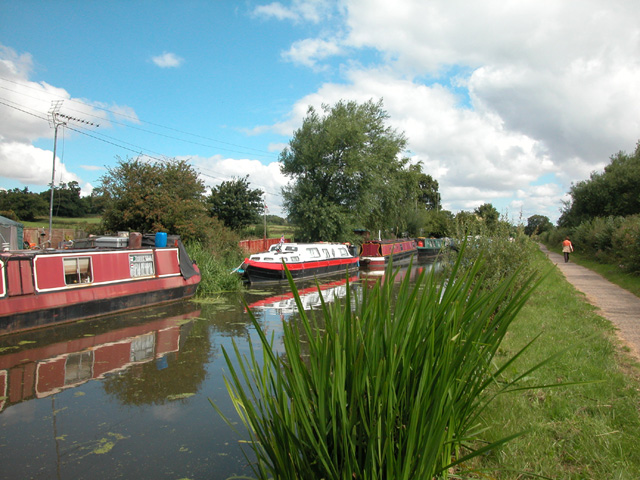
- Shropshire Union Canal Moorings near Wervin

- Location within Cheshire
- Population: 146 (2011 census)
- OS grid reference: SJ422719
- Civil parish: Wervin
- Unitary authority: Cheshire West and Chester
- Ceremonial county: Cheshire
- Region: North West
- Country: England
- Sovereign state: United Kingdom
- Post town: CHESTER
- Postcode district: CH2
- Dialling code: 01244
- Police: Cheshire
- Fire: Cheshire
- Ambulance: North West
- UK Parliament: City of Chester

Wervin is a small village and civil parish in the unitary authority of Cheshire West and Chester and the ceremonial county of Cheshire, England. It is situated between Chester and Ellesmere Port, near the Shropshire Union Canal and the M53 motorway.

== History ==
The origin of the name is uncertain. One possible meaning being "cattle fen", derived from the Old English weorf (cattle) and fenn (a fen or marsh).

Wervin was mentioned in the Domesday Book as Wivevrene and comprised eight households. Ownership of the land was divided between St. Werburgh's Abbey and William Malbank.

The village was a township in St. Oswald's Parish, becoming a civil parish in 1866. Historically, Wervin was within Broxton Hundred and Wirral Hundred at different points in time.

== Demography ==
The population was recorded as 56 in 1801, then 60 in 1851, 94 in 1901 and 89 in 1951. According to the 2001 census, Wervin had a population of 118, increasing to 146 by the 2011 census.

== See also ==
- Listed buildings in Wervin
