= Ledsham, Cheshire =

Coordinates: 53.264°N 2.963°W

Ledsham
- Village
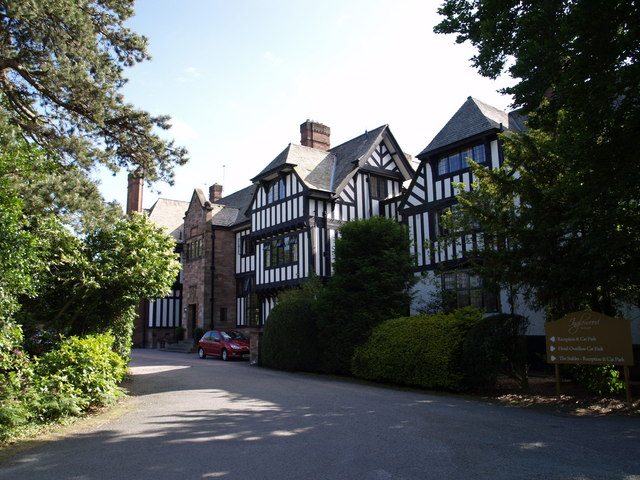
- Inglewood Manor Hotel, Ledsham

- Location within Cheshire
- Population: 181 (2011 Census)
- OS grid reference: SJ358745
- Civil parish: Ledsham
- Unitary authority: Cheshire West and Chester
- Ceremonial county: Cheshire
- Region: North West
- Country: England
- Sovereign state: United Kingdom
- Post town: ELLESMERE PORT
- Postcode district: CH66
- Dialling code: 0151
- Police: Cheshire
- Fire: Cheshire
- Ambulance: North West
- UK Parliament: Chester North and Neston

Ledsham is a village and civil parish in the unitary authority of Cheshire West and Chester and the ceremonial county of Cheshire, England. The civil parish includes parts of the hamlets of Badger's Rake and Two Mills. It is on the Wirral Peninsula, approximately 6 miles (9.7 km) north of Chester and 4 miles (6.4 km) west of Ellesmere Port.

At the 2011 Census, the village had a population of 181.

== History ==
In 1085, Ledsham was recorded in the Domesday Book as Levetesham. The landowner was Walter de Vernon. The land passed by will from the Massey family to Sir Thomas Stanley of Hooton in 1715.

Formerly a township in Neston parish of the Wirral Hundred, it became a civil parish in 1866. The population was recorded at 56 in 1801, 94 in 1851, 82 in 1901, 116 in 1951 and 88 in 2001.

The village was served by Ledsham railway station on the former Chester and Birkenhead Railway. A local cottage had been used as the station building, until the provision of more substantial facilities. At its height, Ledsham station had four platforms and was at the southern end of the railway's quadrupled section. The station never achieved the commercial potential expected by its owners, primarily because of its remote rural location. Ledsham station closed completely on 20 July 1959. However, two tracks of the line are still part of the Merseyrail network.

== Governance ==
Ledsham is within the Chester North and Neston parliamentary constituency. At a local government level, the area is divided between Ledsham & Manor and Saughall & Mollington wards as of 2026.

== Geography ==
The village centre is located approximately 1/2 mile (0.80 km) to the north west of Capenhurst, with the area around the former railway station 1 mile (1.6 km) to the north, in the vicinity of Little Sutton.

== Transport ==
To the north and west of Ledsham, the A550 Welsh Road connects the A41 and A540.

The nearest station is Capenhurst railway station on Merseyrail's Wirral line, with services between Liverpool and Chester.

== Landmarks ==
Inglewood is a Grade II listed building in Ledsham, built as a private house in 1909. As of 2026 the building is the Inglewood Manor Hotel.

== See also ==
- Listed buildings in Ledsham, Cheshire
