= Croughton, Cheshire =

Hamlet in Cheshire, England

Coordinates: 53.244°N 2.878°W

Croughton
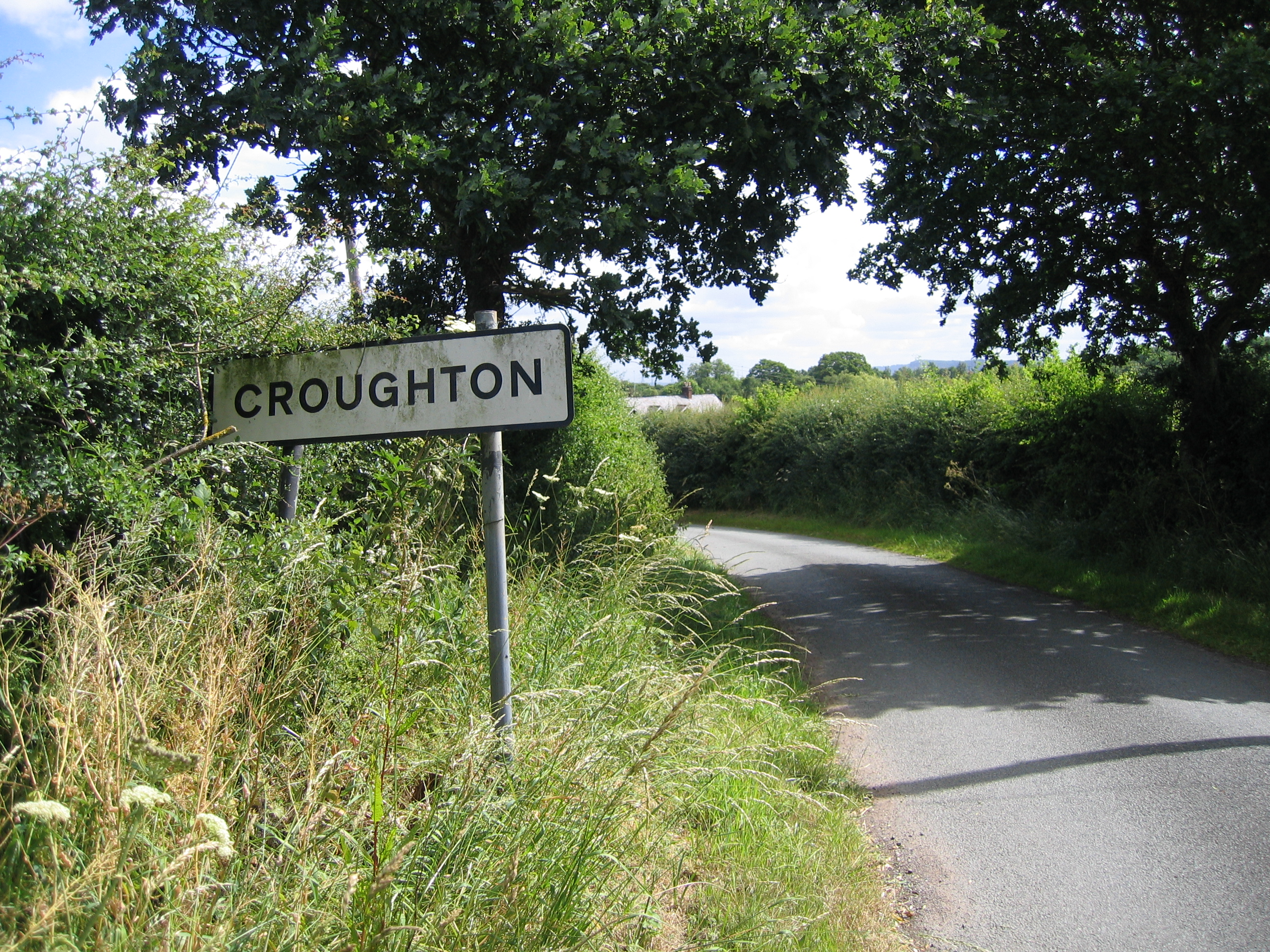
- Entrance sign to Croughton

- Location within Cheshire
- OS grid reference: SJ 419 724
- District: Cheshire
- Unitary authority: Cheshire West and Chester
- Ceremonial county: Cheshire
- Region: North West
- Country: England
- Sovereign state: United Kingdom
- Post town: Chester
- Postcode district: CH2
- Dialling code: 01244
- Police: Cheshire
- Fire: Cheshire
- Ambulance: North West

Croughton is a hamlet and civil parish on the outskirts and 3.5 miles (5.7 km) north of the city of Chester, and part of the unitary authority of Cheshire West and Chester and the ceremonial county of Cheshire. The Shropshire Union Canal runs through Croughton.

== History ==
Croughton is a settlement in St. Oswald's ancient parish, which became a civil parish in 1866. The population was 33 in 1801 and 22 in 1851, these dates being the earliest in the census for the United Kingdom. There is currently no parish council, the civil parish being represented by one councillor on Little Stanney and District Parish Council. The old parishes were formed at a time when there was little difference between the Church and the State, and a parish such as Croughton usually formed around a village or other small settlement, centred on the parish church. The name "Croughton" means bend in the water. Croughton can be found in the Domesday Book. It has one recorded gazetteer descriptive entry, written by John Bartholomew and dated 1887: "Croughton.— township, St Oswald par., W. Cheshire, on Mersey Canal, 4½ miles NE. of Chester, 281 ac., pop. 29."

=== Occupational structure ===
Some data was given in 1881 as to what occupations were held by the people of Croughton. Overall, 19 people, male and female, were accounted for in the data. Compared to the census data of the same year, either the 10 remaining people were unaccounted for, were children or had died by the time the data was collected. The '1881 Data for the occupations of Croughton' chart below shows the data for the 1881 occupational census data for the township of Croughton. Because of Croughton's rural location, it is unsurprising that the majority of people worked in agriculture.

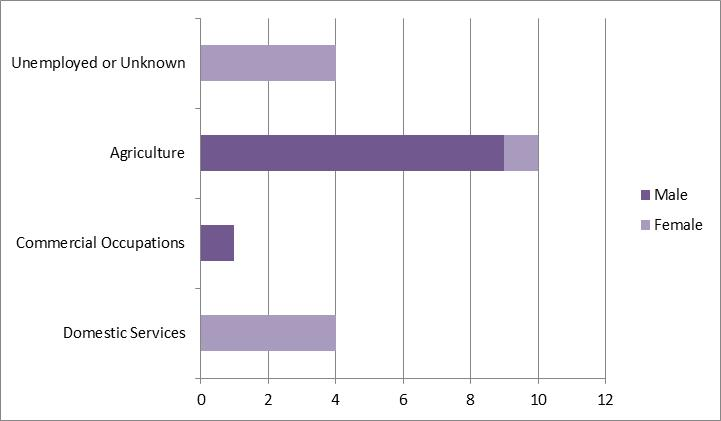
1881 Data for the occupations of Croughton

=== The hamlet today ===
The settlement is made up of houses and buildings along a stretch of road. The hamlet is a rural community, consisting of mainly residential housing with detached and semi-detached housing, as well as being made up mainly of fields behind the settlement and some farms. There are no shops in the settlement, and public transport is scarce, the only bus stops being in the neighbouring village. There are no pubs, bars or restaurants in Croughton, the nearest being Ellesmere Port and Chester.

== Demographic ==
=== Population ===
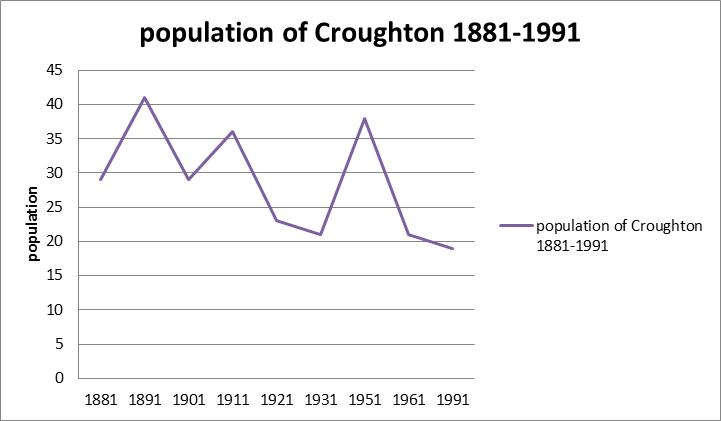

Although the population of Croughton has changed every year of the census, the population has always remained small, giving it a hamlet status. The first recorded census data for Croughton was recorded in 1881, and shows a total population of 29. The graph on the right shows the differences in data. There is no data for 1941 as there was no census recorded during World War II, and data from 1961 to 1991 is unclear. There is no steady pattern in population change.

== Transport ==
Croughton can be accessed via two roads. Caughall Road, which comes off of the A41, and Croughton Road or Wervin Road, coming from the north, join north and south of Croughton, forming a loop. The nearest motorways are the M53 and M56. There is no bus stop in Croughton; the nearest are two on Wervin Road in Wervin, a civil parish 1/4 of a mile away. The DB2 bus provides transport services to the nearest main settlements, including Chester and Ellesmere Port. There is no railway station in Croughton, but the nearest is at Ellesmere Port 4.3 miles away.

== Landmarks ==
The parish contains one listed building, the bridge carrying the road over the Shropshire Union Canal to the northwest of the village. It dates from about 1795, is constructed mainly in brick with stone dressings, and consists of a single segmental arch. It is designated at Grade II, this grade being the lowest of the three gradings given to listed buildings and is applied to buildings "of special interest".
