= Listed buildings in Wervin =

Wervin is a civil parish in Cheshire West and Chester, England. It contains two buildings that are recorded in the National Heritage List for England as designated listed buildings, both of which are listed at Grade II. This grade is the lowest of the three gradings given to listed buildings and is applied to "buildings of national importance and special interest". The parish is entirely rural. The listed buildings consists of a farmhouse and the ruins of a chapel.

Name and location	Photograph	Date	Notes
Chapel; 53.24052°N 2.87132°W	—	13th century (reputed)	Only two eastern angles of the chapel and some low walling remain. They are in red sandstone. The remains are also a scheduled monument.
Wervin Old Hall; 53.24090°N 2.86735°W	—	Late 17th to 18th century	A pebbledashed farmhouse on a rendered plinth with a slate roof. It consists of a main wing with two storeys, and a cross-wing of 2 1/2 storeys. The windows are a mix of sashes and casements. There is a projecting porch with a tiled roof. Inside the farmhouse is an inglenook with a bressumer.
