= Little Stanney =

Village in Cheshire, England

Coordinates: 53.261°N 2.886°W

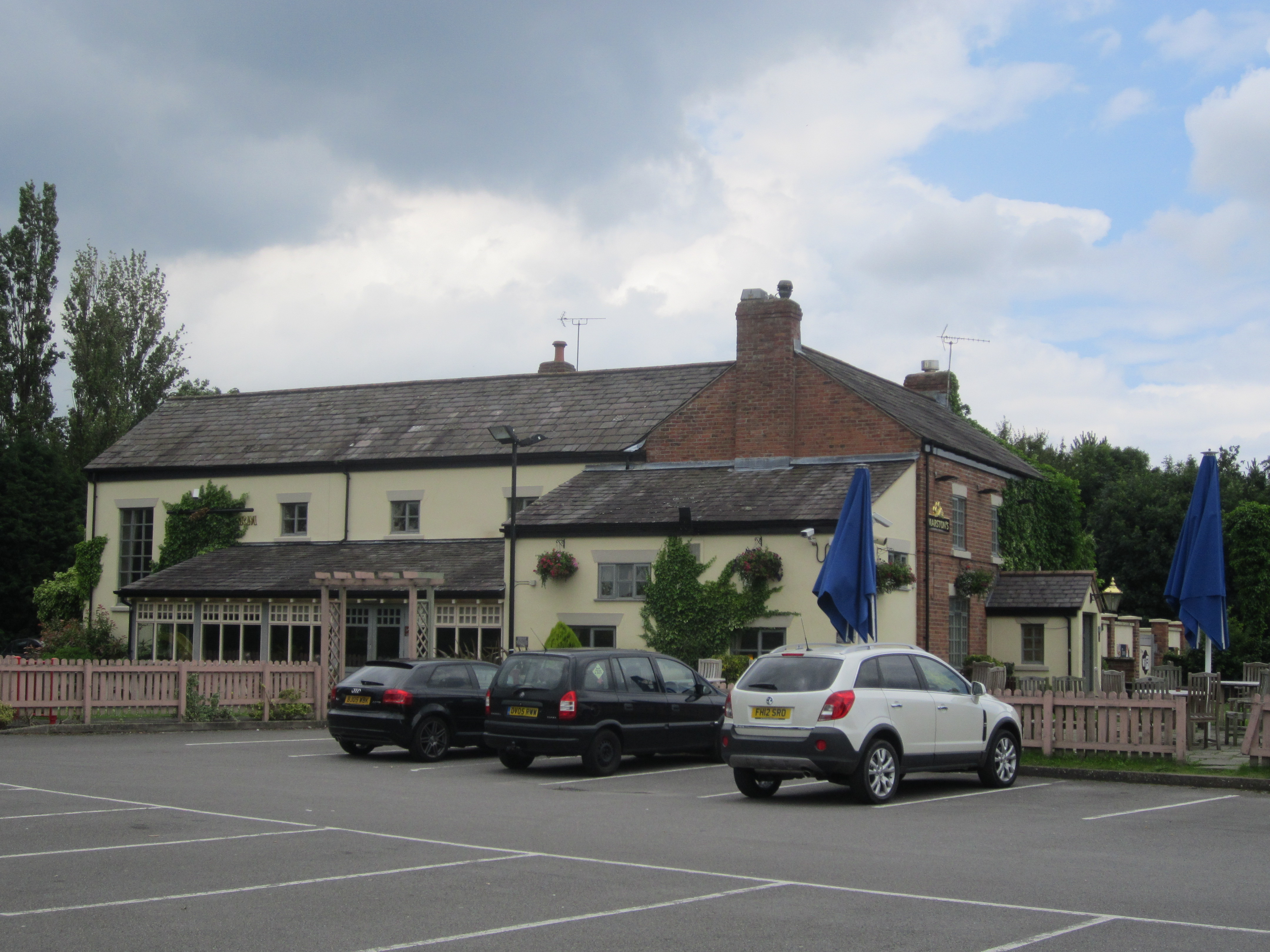
- Old Hall Farm pub

- Location within Cheshire
- Population: 198 (2011 census)
- OS grid reference: SJ409741
- Civil parish: Little Stanney
- Unitary authority: Cheshire West and Chester
- Ceremonial county: Cheshire
- Region: North West
- Country: England
- Sovereign state: United Kingdom
- Post town: ELLESMERE PORT
- Postcode district: CH65
- Dialling code: 0151
- Police: Cheshire
- Fire: Cheshire
- Ambulance: North West
- UK Parliament: Runcorn and Helsby

Little Stanney is a suburban village and civil parish in the unitary authority of Cheshire West and Chester and the ceremonial county of Cheshire, England. It is located on the Wirral Peninsula between Chester and Ellesmere Port.

At the 2011 census the population of the parish was 198.

== History ==
In 1086, Little Stanney was recorded in the Domesday Book as Stanei and was described as a fishery. The land was held by "Restald from Earl Hugh" (a Norman baron).

The village was originally part of the Stoak Parish in the Wirral Hundred. The population was 203 in 1801, 177 in 1851, 145 in 1901, 268 in 1951 and 281 in 2001. In 1894, Little Stanney became part of Chester Rural District. Part of the parish was transferred to the Municipal Borough of Ellesmere Port in 1967.

== Economy ==
The Cheshire Oaks Designer Outlet is situated to the north and east of the village. It opened in 1995 and consists of over 37,000 square metres (400,000 square feet) of retail space. The Blue Planet Aquarium, Cheshire Oaks Business Park, Coliseum Leisure Park, a leisure club and other businesses have located here.

== Landmarks ==
The parish contains one building that is recorded in the National Heritage List for England as a designated listed building. This is Rake Hall, listed at Grade II, which originated as a country house in the 17th century, and was later converted into a public house and restaurant.

== Transport ==
The A5117 road bisects the village of Little Stanney, leading to Backford Cross and the A41 road from junction 10 of the M53 motorway.

== Education ==
The nearby Stanney High School was renamed Cheshire Oaks High School, but has now closed and been amalgamated into the University of Chester Church of England Academy.
