= Aldford Lodge =

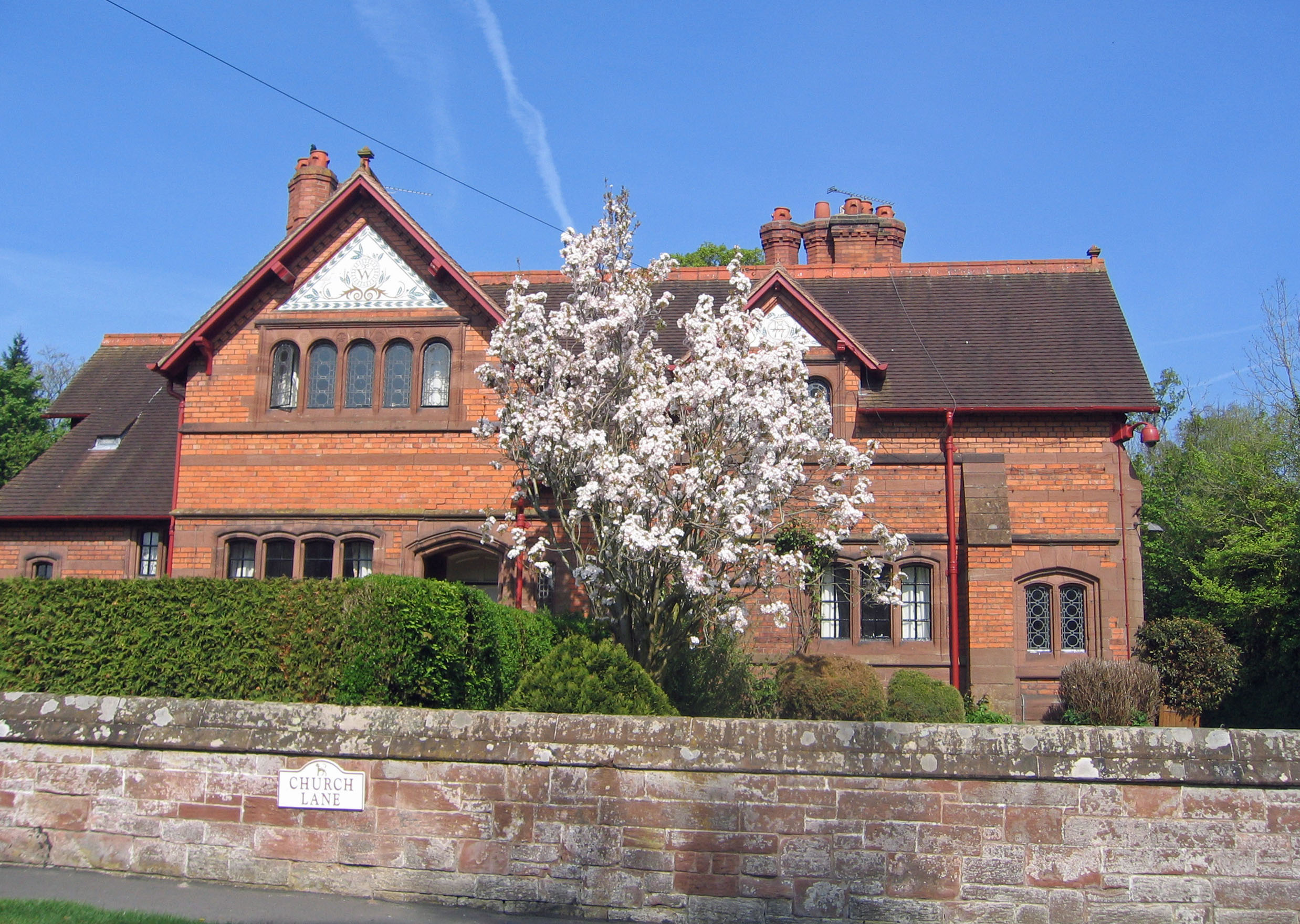
- Aldford Lodge

- Location in Cheshire
- 53.1289°N 2.8661°W
- Location: Aldford, Cheshire, England
- OS grid reference: SJ 421 594

History
- Built: 1877–79
- Built for: 1st Duke of Westminster

Site notes
- Architect: John Douglas

Listed Building – Grade II
- Official name: Aldford Lodge to Eaton Park and attached Avenue Cottage
- Designated: 2 November 1983
- Reference no.: 1330590

Aldford Lodge consists of a pair of cottages at the Aldford entrance to Eaton Hall, Cheshire, England. It is recorded in the National Heritage List for England as a designated Grade II listed building.

== History ==
The National Heritage List for England states that the design was probably by Alfred Waterhouse. However Edward Hubbard, in his biography of John Douglas, gives a firm attribution to Douglas as the architect. The authors of the Buildings of England series also attribute the design to Douglas. The lodge was built in 1877–79 for the 1st Duke of Westminster.

== Architecture ==
The lodge is built in brick with stone banding and dressings on a stone plinth in 1½ storeys. It is roofed with red tiles. It has two gables, each with pargeting decorated with foliated geometric patterns. The windows have moulded stone surrounds; those on the ground floor have camber arches and on the upper floor the window arches are semicircular. Over the doors are Tudor style arches. The whole building is irregularly shaped and this is emphasised by the addition of buttresses.

== See also ==
- Listed buildings in Aldford
- List of houses and associated buildings by John Douglas
