= Aldford Hall =

- Location in Cheshire
- 53.1172°N 2.8710°W
- Location: Aldford, Cheshire, England
- OS grid reference: SJ 417 581

History
- Built: 1876–81
- Built for: Hugh Grosvenor, 1st Duke of Westminster

Site notes
- Architect: John Douglas

Listed Building – Grade II
- Designated: 2 November 1983
- Reference no.: 1129947

Aldford Hall is a farmhouse to the south of the village of Aldford, Cheshire, England. It is recorded in the National Heritage List for England as a designated Grade II listed building.

The house was designed by John Douglas for Hugh Grosvenor, 1st Duke of Westminster as part of a model farm, and built between 1876 and 1881. In about 1912 it was converted into two cottages with no alteration to its exterior. The lower storey is built in red sandstone and the upper storey is built in brown brick with blue diapering and sandstone dressings.

== See also ==
- Listed buildings in Aldford
- List of houses and associated buildings by John Douglas
