= Listed buildings in Aldford =

Aldford is a former civil parish, now in the parish of Aldford and Saighton, in Cheshire West and Chester, England. It contains 26 buildings that are recorded in the National Heritage List for England as designated listed buildings. The parish lies within the estate of Eaton Hall. The major settlement is the village of Aldford, and many of the buildings in the village were built for the Grosvenor family of Eaton Hall. Most of the listed buildings are located in or near the village.

== Key ==
Grade	Criteria
I	Buildings of exceptional interest, sometimes considered to be internationally important.
II	Buildings of national importance and special interest.

== Buildings ==
Name and location	Photograph	Date	Notes	Grade
Churchyard cross and base 53.12879°N 2.86985°W		Medieval (probable)	The original part is the base, consisting of four steps. The cross is dated 1901, and is in sandstone. On the shaft are two brass plaques, both inscribed, one with the Apostles' Creed. On the head of the cross is a carving of the Crucifixion.	II
Thatched cottage 53.1273°N 2.8714°W		Early 17th century	A timber-framed cottage with brick nogging and a thatched roof. It is in two storeys and contains casement windows.	II
Stocks; 53.12790°N 2.86560°W		17th century (probable)	The stocks are in sandstone and oak. They contain four leg-holes, behind which is a sandstone seat, and a retaining wall.	II
Bank Farm Farmhouse; 53.1271°N 2.8660°W		Mid-18th century	The farmhouse is built in brick with a sandstone plinth, quoins and cornice. It is a symmetrical rectangular building in two storeys. The windows are casements dating from about 1830.	II
Sundial; 53.12896°N 2.87017°W		18th century (probable)	Standing in St John's churchyard, this consists of a sundial with a copper dial on a red sandstone pier. The pier is square, and stands on a square base with two steps.	II
Aldford Iron Bridge; 53.13480°N 2.87111°W		1824	A bridge designed by Thomas Telford and built by William Hazledine for the 1st Marquis of Westminster. It is built in cast iron and has yellow sandstone abutments forming a single arch. There are cast iron railings, and double gates at the crown of the bridge.	I
Farm building, Lea Manor Farm; 53.1152°N 2.8468°W		Early 19th century	A brick building in two storeys with a gabled slate roof. It contains cowsheds, a hayloft, and a pigeon loft with nesting boxes. Other features include loading doors, ventilation panels with honeycomb brickwork, and other ventilators in the form of triple-barred crosses.	II
Thatched cottage 53.1273°N 2.8714°W		Before 1837	A sandstone cottage with a thatched roof in 1½ storeys. The upper storey projects forwards. On the front of the cottage are a thatched dormer containing a casement window, and gable with a stone niche. At the rear are thatched eyebrow dormers.	II
Aldford Bridge; 53.12883°N 2.86512°W		Mid-19th century (probable)	A sandstone bridge carrying the B5130 Chester-Farndon road over Aldford Brook. It has three segmental arches with plain rectangular pilasters between the arches and at the ends of the abutments.	II
Rose Cottage and West View; 53.1255°N 2.8676°W		c. 1860	A pair of cottages built in brick with slate roofs standing on a sandstone plinth. They are in 1½ storeys. On the front are half-dormers, and on the sides are half-timbered gables.	II
Vine Cottage and Smithy Cottage; 53.1267°N 2.8661°W		c. 1863	A pair of cottages built for the 2nd Marquess of Westminster. They are constructed in brick with gabled slate roofs. The cottages are in two storeys, with dentillated eaves. The windows are casements.	II
St John the Baptist's Church; 53.1290°N 2.8698°W		1866	The church was designed by John Douglas for Richard Grosvenor, 2nd Marquess of Westminster. It is constructed in sandstone with a slate roof. It has a west tower with a shingled spire. Additions and alterations were made in 1902 by Douglas and Minshull.	II
Churchyard wall and gates, St John's Church; 53.12860°N 2.86988°W		c. 1866	The churchyard walls are in sandstone rubble with a moulded coping. The gateposts are monoliths, and the gates are in oak.	II
Church View and Post Office; 53.1285°N 2.8701°W		c. 1870 (probable)	A cottage and a post office with an attached dwelling, constructed in brown brick with blue brick diapering in the upper storey. The building is in simplified Jacobean style, and has tiled roofs. The windows are mullioned casements, and the large post office window is also transomed.	II
School and schoolhouse 53.1257°N 2.8668°W		1872	This was built as a school and a schoolmaster's house. The school closed in 1912, and the building has been converted into two cottages. It is constructed in brick on a sandstone plinth, and has half-timbered gables, and tiled roofs. The building is in 1½ storeys.	II
Rushmere View; 53.1262°N 2.8707°W		1874	A terrace of four houses designed by John Douglas for the 1st Duke of Westminster. Its upper storey is partly pargetted, and partly timber-framed. The roofs are tiled.	II
Clematis Cottage; 53.1266°N 2.8700°W		c. 1875	A terrace of four cottages designed by John Douglas for the 1st Duke of Westminster. The lower storey is in brick, the upper storey is rendered with pargetting and three gabled dormers. On the right is a single-storey wing containing the fourth cottage; its end gable is timber-framed.	II
Pair of cottages 53.1266°N 2.8712°W		c. 1875	A pair of cottages designed by John Douglas for the 1st Duke of Westminster. They are in 1½ storeys, the lower storey being in brick, the upper storey being rendered with floral-decorated pargetting. At the front are paired dormer gables.	II
Aldford Hall; 53.1173°N 2.8710°W	—	1876–81	The farmhouse of a model farm designed by John Douglas for the 1st Duke of Westminster, later converted into two cottages. It is in two storeys, the lower storey being in sandstone, the upper storey in brown brick with blue brick diapering. It has a complex tiled hipped roof with shaped gables. There is a massive central brick chimney.	II
Aldford Lodge; 53.1289°N 2.8662°W		1877	A pair of cottages for the 1st Duke of Westminster designed either by Alfred Waterhouse or John Douglas. They are in brick with stone dressings on a stone plinth with pargetted gables and tiled roofs. They are in 1½ storeys, each cottage having approximately two bays. The windows are casements.	II
Gates, Aldford Lodge; 53.12892°N 2.86579°W		c. 1877	Designed for the 1st Duke of Westminster, possibly by Alfred Waterhouse or by John Douglas. They consist of wrought iron gates between piers, flanked by stone wing walls. The gates are decorated, and incorporate the initial "W". On each pier is a tapered square lantern.	II
Farm buildings, Aldford Hall; 53.1176°N 2.8714°W	—	1883	Designed by John Douglas for the 1st Duke of Westminster, this is part of a model farm. The buildings are constructed in brick with stone dressings and tiled roofs. Features include a pedimented loading door, a flèche acting as a ventilator, haylofts, and ventilators in the walls in ornate patterns.	II
1 and 2 Church Lane; 53.1285°N 2.8664°W		1893	A pair of cottages for the 1st Duke of Westminster, probably designed by Douglas & Fordham. They are asymmetrical, in Jacobean style with 1½ storeys. The cottages are built in red brick with blue brick diapering, and slate roofs. Features include shaped gables, shaped chimneys, and casement windows.	II
Brook View and Nurses' Cottage; 53.1283°N 2.8659°W		1893	A pair of cottages with an attached dispensary designed by Douglas & Fordham for the 1st Duke of Westminster. The cottages are in 1½ storeys, and the dispensary in a single storey. They are constructed in brown brick with blue brick diapering. The roofs are tiled, and the windows are mullioned or casements. Other features include gabled dormers and a central chimney with diagonal flues.	II
Old Rectory; 53.1290°N 2.8680°W		1897	Designed by Thomas Lockwood and Sons for the 1st Duke of Westminster, the house is constructed in red brick with blue diapering on a sandstone plinth with sandstone dressings. It is roofed in Westmorland slate. The house is in 2½ storeys with a garden front of four bays. The windows are mullioned and transomed.	II
Telephone kiosk 53.12846°N 2.86884°W		1935	A type K6 telephone kiosk designed by Giles Gilbert Scott. It is constructed in cast iron, and has a square plan with a domed top. The top panels are embellished with unperforated crowns.	II

== See also ==
- Listed buildings in Buerton
- Listed buildings in Churton by Aldford
- Listed buildings in Coddington
- Listed buildings in Eaton
- Listed buildings in Eccleston
- Listed buildings in Golborne David
- Listed buildings in Handley
- Listed buildings in Huntington
- Listed buildings in Huxley
- Listed buildings in Poulton
- Listed buildings in Pulford
- Listed buildings in Rowton
- Listed buildings in Saighton
- Listed buildings in Waverton
