= Listed buildings in Great Altcar =

Great Altcar is a civil parish in the West Lancashire district of Lancashire, England. It contains eleven buildings that are recorded in the National Heritage List for England as designated listed buildings. Of these, one is at Grade II*, the middle grade, and the others are at Grade II, the lowest grade. The parish is almost completely rural. Apart from a church, its lychgate, and a war memorial in the churchyard, all the listed buildings are houses, farmhouses and farm buildings.

== Key ==
Grade	Criteria
II*	Particularly important buildings of more than special interest
II	Buildings of national importance and special interest

== Buildings ==
Name and location	Photograph	Date	Notes	Grade
Barn, Altcar Hall Farm; 53.55039°N 3.02751°W	—	Mid-17th century (probable)	The barn is timber-framed, encased partly in brick and partly in stone, and has a T-shaped plan. The west gable wall has an external stone staircase leading to a loft doorway. In the barn are doorways and windows. Inside, the barn has at least seven bays with substantial cruck frames.	II
Old Gore Farmhouse; 53.52333°N 2.96405°W	—	Mid-17th century (probable)	A brick house on a stone plinth with a slate roof, in two storeys. At the left is a protruding wing, and towards the right is a two-storey porch, both under a continuous swept-down roof. The porch contains a doorway with a round arch and a rendered surround, and above it is a decorated and inscribed plaque. The windows are mullioned with plastered surrounds. Inside the house is a bressumer.	II
Hill House Farmhouse; 53.54731°N 2.99371°W	—	1673	The house was extended in the 19th century. The early part is in sandstone, the later part is brick, and the house has a slate roof. The early part has mullioned windows, an inscribed plaque on the front, and a doorway with a slate canopy. The later part has three gables and sash windows.	II
Upper Gore Farmhouse; 53.52272°N 2.96366°W	—	Late 17th century	The farmhouse is partly in stone and partly in brick, all on a plinth and with a Welsh slate roof. The house has a T-shaped plan with a front range and a rear wing. The windows at the front ae casements, and elsewhere they are 17th-century mullioned windows. The porch is in the angle between the ranges, and re-uses a 17th-century doorway with a re-set inscribed lintel. Inside the house is one full cruck truss.	II
Longton's Farmhouse; 53.54948°N 3.02135°W	—	Mid-18th century (probable)	A brick house on a sandstone plinth with a thatched roof, in two storeys and two bays. The windows are casements, those on the ground floor with segmental heads. The doorway also has a segmental head.	II
Francis' Farmhouse; 53.54848°N 3.02017°W	—	1806	The house is in brick with a slate roof, and has two storeys and two bays. The windows are sashes with stone lintels and sills. The doorway is round-headed with moulded imposts and a keystone. Above the doorway is a plaque inscribed with the date.	II
New Hill House; 53.54793°N 2.99204°W	—	Mid-19th century	A brick house with stone dressings and a slate roof, in two storeys with an attic. In the front is a gabled projection, to the right of which is an open loggia with three Tudor arches. To the left are two bays, the right one containing a gabled porch that has an open Tudor-arched doorway with a coat of arms above. The windows are mullioned and have hood moulds, those in the ground floor also being transomed, and those in the upper floor with sashes.	II
Dutch barn, Francis' Farm; 53.54887°N 3.01918°W	—	Mid-19th century	The Dutch barn is in eight bays. It has steel L-beams, brick gable walls, and a slate roof.	II
St Michael's Church; 53.55093°N 3.02827°W		1878–79	The church, designed by John Douglas, is timber-framed on a brick plinth and has a red tile roof. It consists of a nave, a south porch, a north aisle, a chancel, a north organ chamber and vestry, and a bellcote on the west gable. The bellcote is also timber-framed, and has a pyramidal roof with a finial and a weathervane.	II*
Lychgate; 53.55075°N 3.02785°W		1879 (probable)	The lychgate is at the entrance to the churchyard of St Michael's Church. It is in oak and has a roof of stone-slate. The gateposts have curved braces going down to the ground and up to the roof, and are joined by an inscribed beam.	II
War memorial 53.55090°N 3.02809°W	—	1920	The war memorial stands in the churchyard of St Michael's Church. It is in sandstone, and consists of a wheel-head cross about 3.6 metres (12 ft) high. The cross has an oblong tapering shaft, an oblong tapered plinth with a projecting cornice, and a base of two steps. The head is decorated with a carved fleur-de-lis cross in relief intertwined with the "IHS" Christogram at the centre. On the plinth is an inscription and the names of those lost in both World Wars, and on two sides are carved wreathes.	II
