= 31 and 33 Dee Banks, Chester =

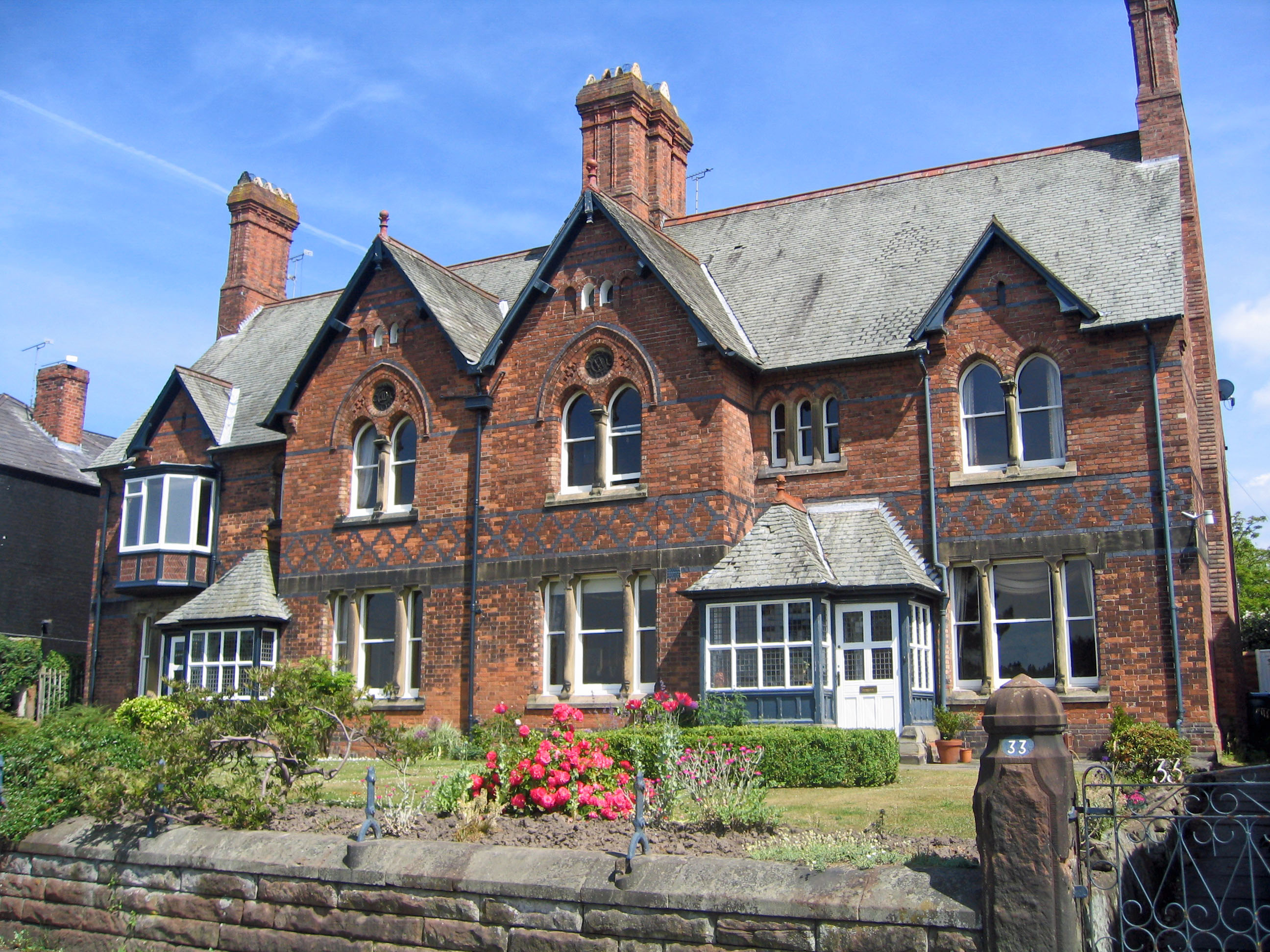
- 31 and 33 Dee Banks; Number 33 is on the right

- Location in Cheshire
- 53.1858°N 2.8687°W
- Location: Chester, Cheshire, England
- OS grid reference: SJ 420,657

History
- Built: 1869
- Built for: John Douglas

Site notes
- Architect: John Douglas
- Architectural style: Gothic Revival

Listed Building – Grade II
- Official name: Beauford Lodge (No.31) and front garden walls and gate piers
- Designated: 10 January 1972
- Reference no.: 1375759

31 and 33 Dee Banks is a pair of semi-detached houses in Chester, Cheshire, England. The houses are recorded in the National Heritage List for England as a designated Grade II listed building. The historical importance of the houses, in addition to their listing, is that they were designed by the Chester architect John Douglas, who lived in No. 33 for 20 years.

== Location ==
The houses stand on the east side of Dee Banks in Great Boughton, Chester, about 1 mile (1.6 km) from the city centre, in an elevated position overlooking the River Dee, with views over meadowland towards the city.

== History ==
The land on which the houses were constructed was owned by John Douglas; one of the houses (No. 33) was built for his own use and the other was probably an investment. From the time he moved to Chester in either 1855 or 1860, Douglas and his family lived in Abbey Square in the centre of the city, initially above his office at No. 6 and later next door at No. 4. Although the houses are dated 1869, the family did not move there until about 1876. Douglas' wife, Elizabeth, died in 1878, and Douglas continued to live with his family in 33 Dee Banks for a further 18 years until he built a large mansion, Walmoor Hill, for himself nearby in 1896. An oriel window was added to the upper storey of No. 31 in about 1945.

== Architecture ==
Other than the oriel window, the building is symmetrical and it has two storeys; each house is a mirror-image of the other. It is constructed in brown brick with diapering in blue brick and some stone dressings; the roof is of grey-green slate. The building has six bays, three to each house. The central two bays project forwards and each is gabled; there are smaller gables over the outer bays. In each angle outside the central bays is a timber-framed porch and a small conservatory with a hipped roof. The lower storey has sash windows in both central and outer bays. Between the storeys is diapered brickwork. In the upper storey, No. 31 has a five-faced oriel window in its outer bay, while the corresponding window of No. 33 has a double-arched window. Above each porch is a triple-sash window. In each central bay is a pair of arched sash windows and over each of these is an inscribed circular panel. The inscription in the panel on No. 31 reads "JD" (for John Douglas), and that on No. 33 "V&A" (for Victoria and Albert). Above the upper-storey windows in the outer bays is a small one-pane window and above the windows in the central bays is a pair of small arched windows. The roof is ridged. A pair of substantial brick chimneys rises from the centre of the building and another more slender chimney is at the lateral end of each ridge. The sandstone garden walls and gate piers are included in the listing.

Douglas' biographer, Edward Hubbard, commented on the "quality of massiveness" of the houses in their "prominent site" above the river but notes that internally they were "quite modest in their scale and their fittings". He stated that originally on the garden walls were railings that consisted of widely spaced uprights with forked bases. Hubbard considered that the most characteristic features of Douglas on the houses are the timber-framed porches, the polychromic brickwork, and the ribbed brick chimneystacks.

== See also ==
- Grade II listed buildings in Chester (east)
- List of houses and associated buildings by John Douglas
