= St John the Baptist's Church, Aldford =

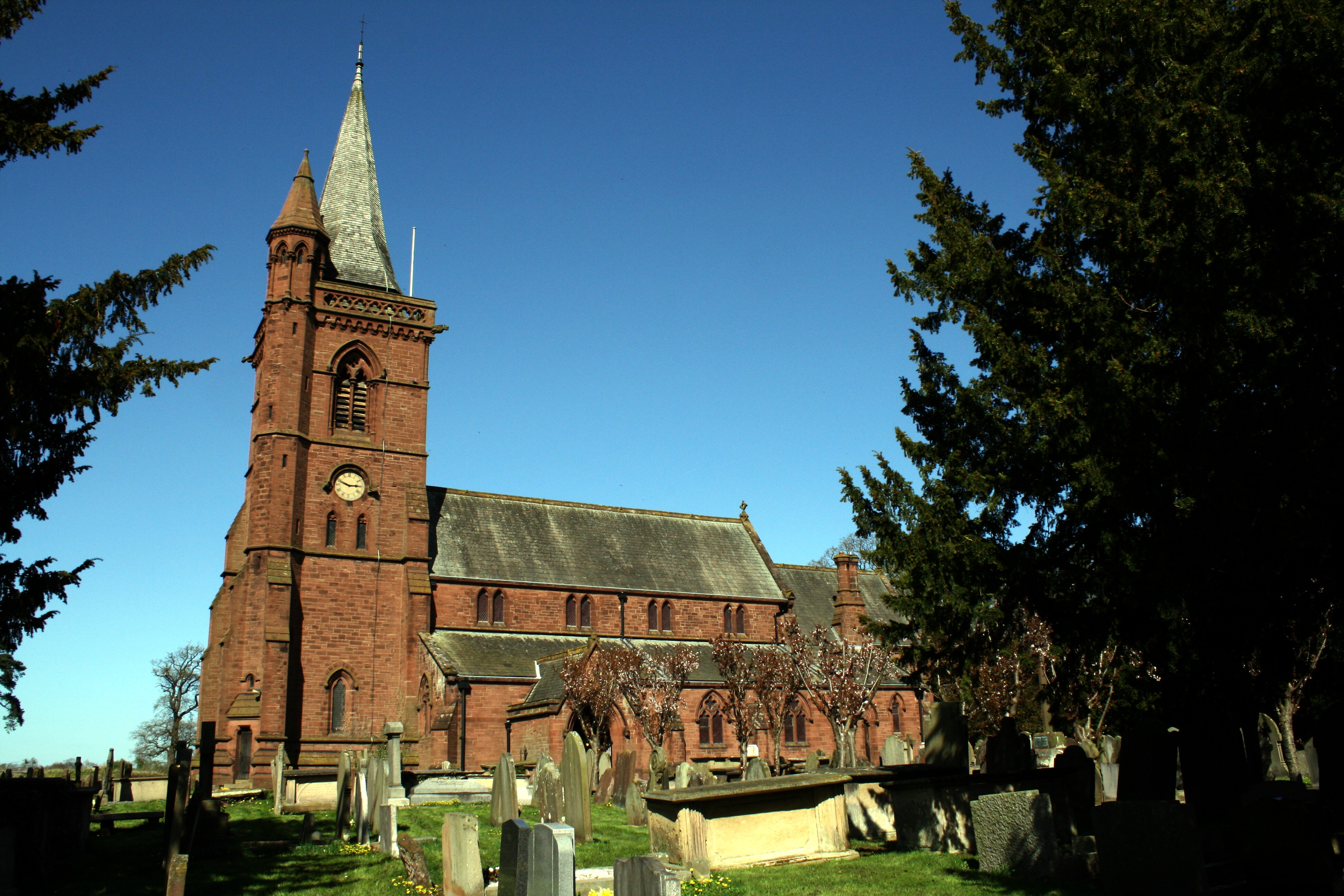
- St John the Baptist's Church, Aldford, from the southwest

- Location in Cheshire
- 53.1290°N 2.8698°W
- OS grid reference: SJ 419,595
- Denomination: Anglican
- Churchmanship: Traditional Anglican
- Website: https://aldfordandbruerachurches.wordpress.com

History
- Status: Parish church
- Dedication: St John the Baptist
- Consecrated: 1866

Architecture
- Functional status: Active
- Heritage designation: Grade II
- Designated: 1 June 1967
- Architect: John Douglas
- Architectural type: Church
- Style: Gothic Revival
- Groundbreaking: 1865
- Completed: 1866

Specifications
- Materials: Red sandstone with a slate roof and a shingled spire

Administration
- Province: York
- Diocese: Chester
- Archdeaconry: Chester
- Deanery: Malpas
- Parish: Aldford

Clergy
- Rector: Revd Jules Beauchamp

St John the Baptist's Church is in the village of Aldford, Cheshire, England. The church is recorded in the National Heritage List for England as a designated Grade II listed building. It is an active Anglican parish church in the diocese of Chester, the archdeaconry of Chester and the deanery of Malpas. Its benefice is combined with those of St Peter, Waverton and St Mary, Bruera. It is described by the authors of the Buildings of England series as "expensive" and "stiffly conventional".

== History ==
The church was built in 1866 on the site of a previous church to a design by John Douglas at the expense of Richard Grosvenor, 2nd Marquess of Westminster. The vestry was converted into a chapel, and a new vestry was added in 1902 by Douglas and Minshull.

== Architecture ==
=== Exterior ===
The church is constructed in red sandstone with a grey-green slate roof and a shingled spire. The architectural style is that of the late 13th century. Its plan consists of a west tower, a four-bay nave with a clerestory, north and south aisles, a chancel with a north chapel, and a south vestry, and a south porch. The tower is in three stages with a recessed octagonal spire, and at its southwest is an octagonal stair turret with a small stone spire. Lancet windows are in the first and second stages of the tower, above which are paired bell-openings. At the top is a corbelled open parapet. A rose window is in the north wall of the chapel. Over the south doorway is the damaged dedication stone from the former church. The porch is in striped stone, and has a pointed barrel vault.

=== Interior ===
The interior of the church is in ashlar stone, the walls of the tower and chancel being diapered. The arcades are carried on polished limestone monolithic columns. Both the pulpit and the font are in marble. The reredos contains five panels of mosaics by Salviati. The stained glass in the east window of the chapel dates from the 19th century and was made by Morris & Co. to a design by Burne-Jones. In the church are memorials, some of which have come from the previous church. These include a monument to the memory of Lieut. Job Watson Royle who was killed in 1812 at the Battle of Badajoz. Another memorial is a wooden tablet to Frances Jones who died in 1719. In the vestry is a benefaction board covering the period 1682–1723. At the base of the tower is a list of rectors going back to about 1300. The organ was made by William Hill and later modified by Robert Hope-Jones. A further modification was carried out in about 1997 by David Wells. There is a ring of six bells. Four of these were cast in 1865 by Mears & Stainbank at the Whitechapel Bell Foundry, and the other two are by John Taylor & Co. of Loughborough.

== External features ==
Associated with the church are three structures listed at Grade II. In the churchyard is a red sandstone cross on a base of four steps. The base is medieval and the shaft and head are dated 1901. On the head is a carving of the Crucifixion. An affixed plaque reads "To the honour and glory of God and in pious memory of Hugh Lupus, Duke of Westminster. This ancient cross is restored by some who loved him, 1901". Also in the churchyard is a sundial with a copper plate on a sandstone pier which probably dates from the 18th century. The churchyard walls and gates date from around 1866. The walls are made from squared rubble red sandstone and the gates are of oak. Also in the churchyard is the war grave of an Army Service Corps soldier of World War I. To the north of the church are the earthworks and some stone fragments remaining from Aldford Castle.

Adjoining listed buildings

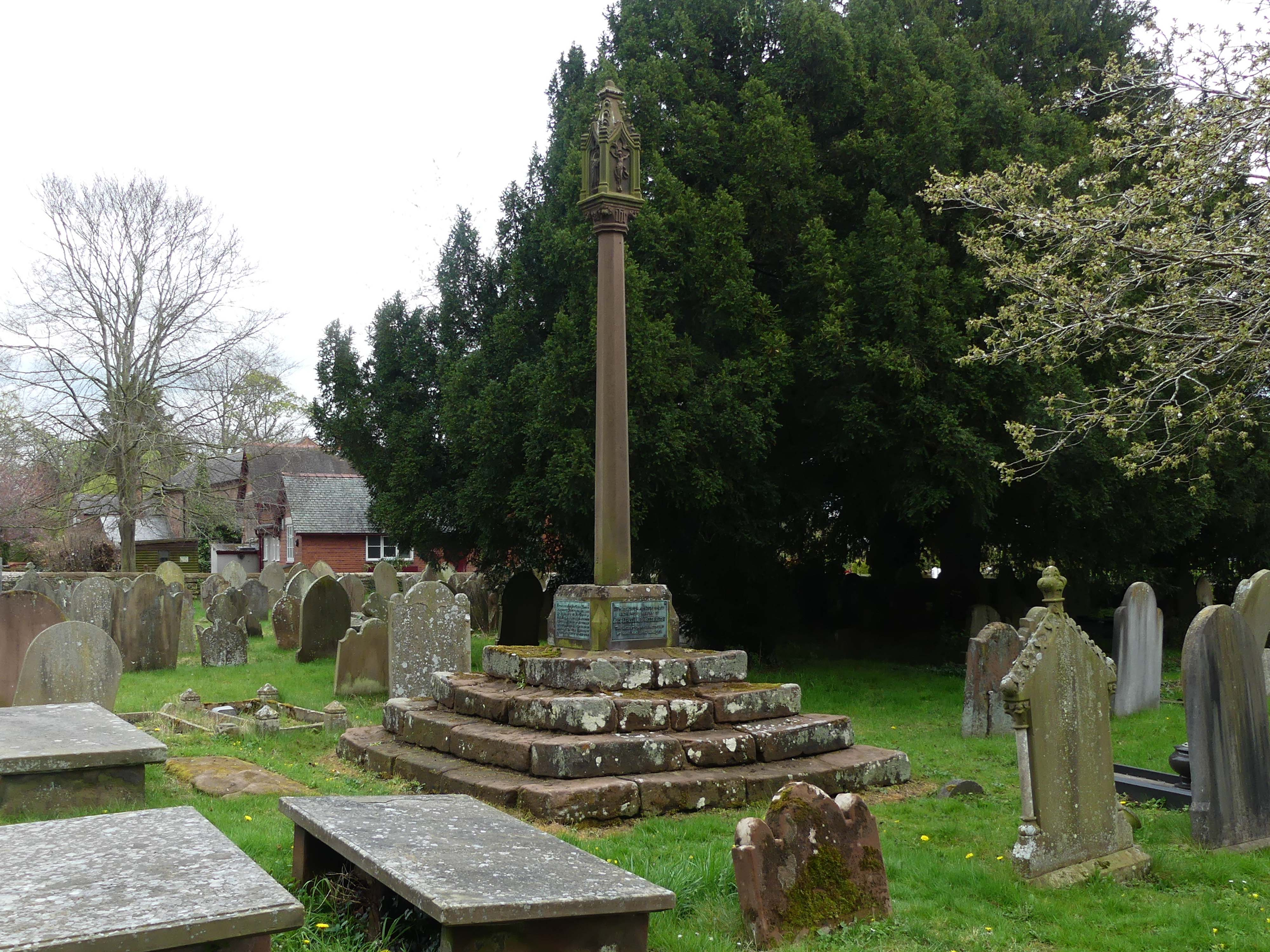
Churchyard cross

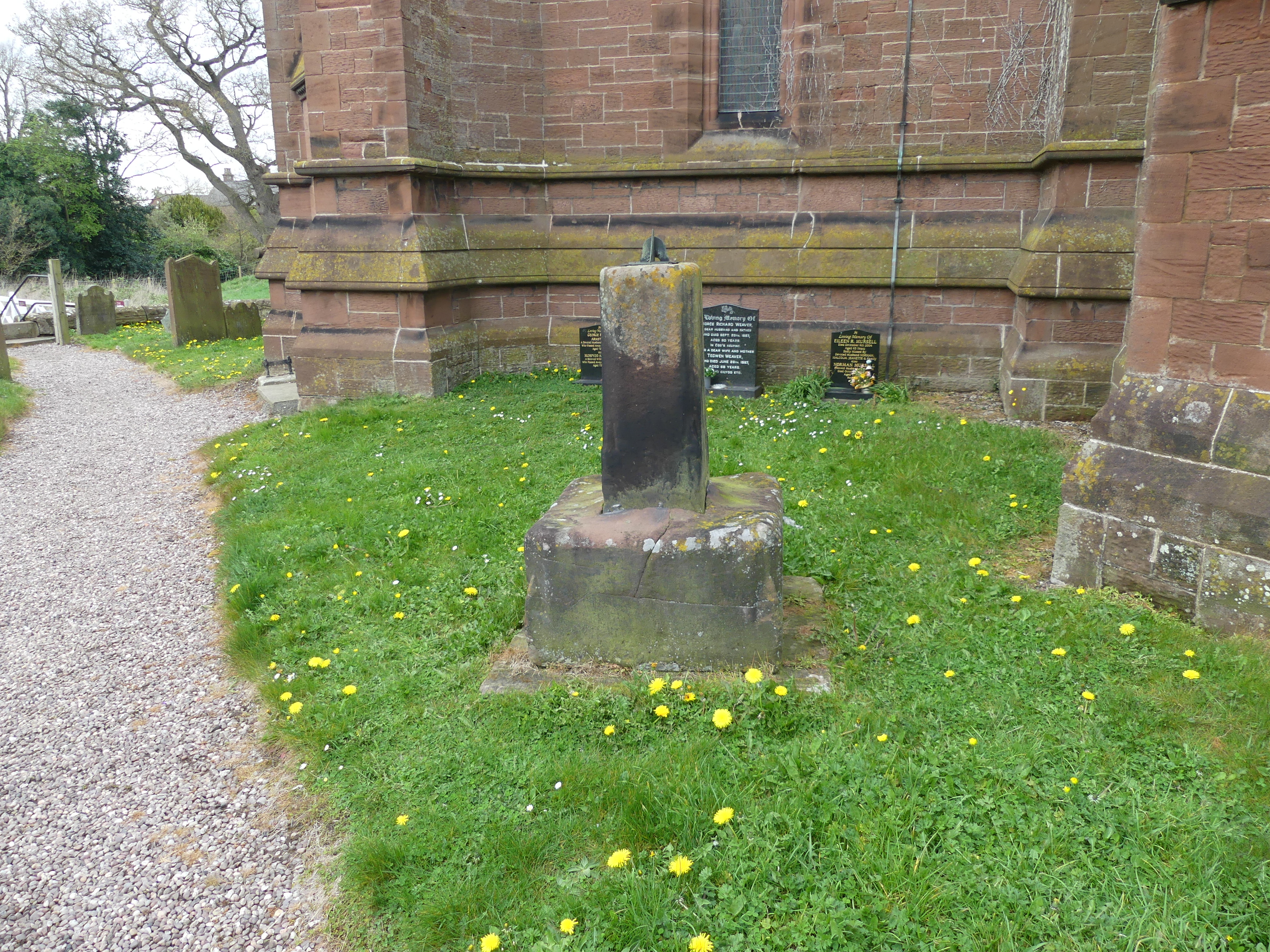
Sundial

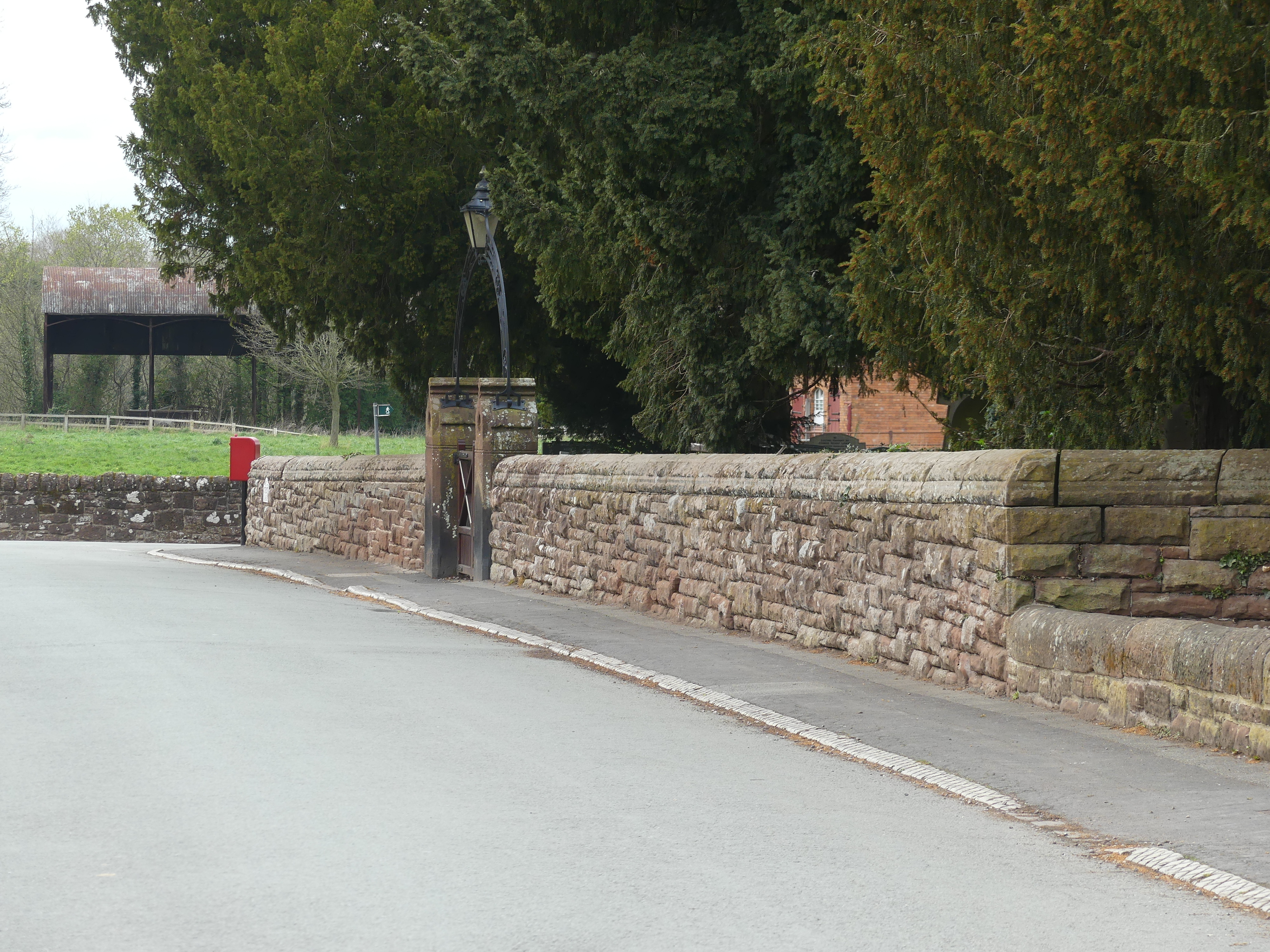
Churchyard wall and gate

== See also ==
- Listed buildings in Aldford
- List of new churches by John Douglas
