= St Michael and All Angels Church, Altcar =

Coordinates: 53.5509°N 3.0283°W

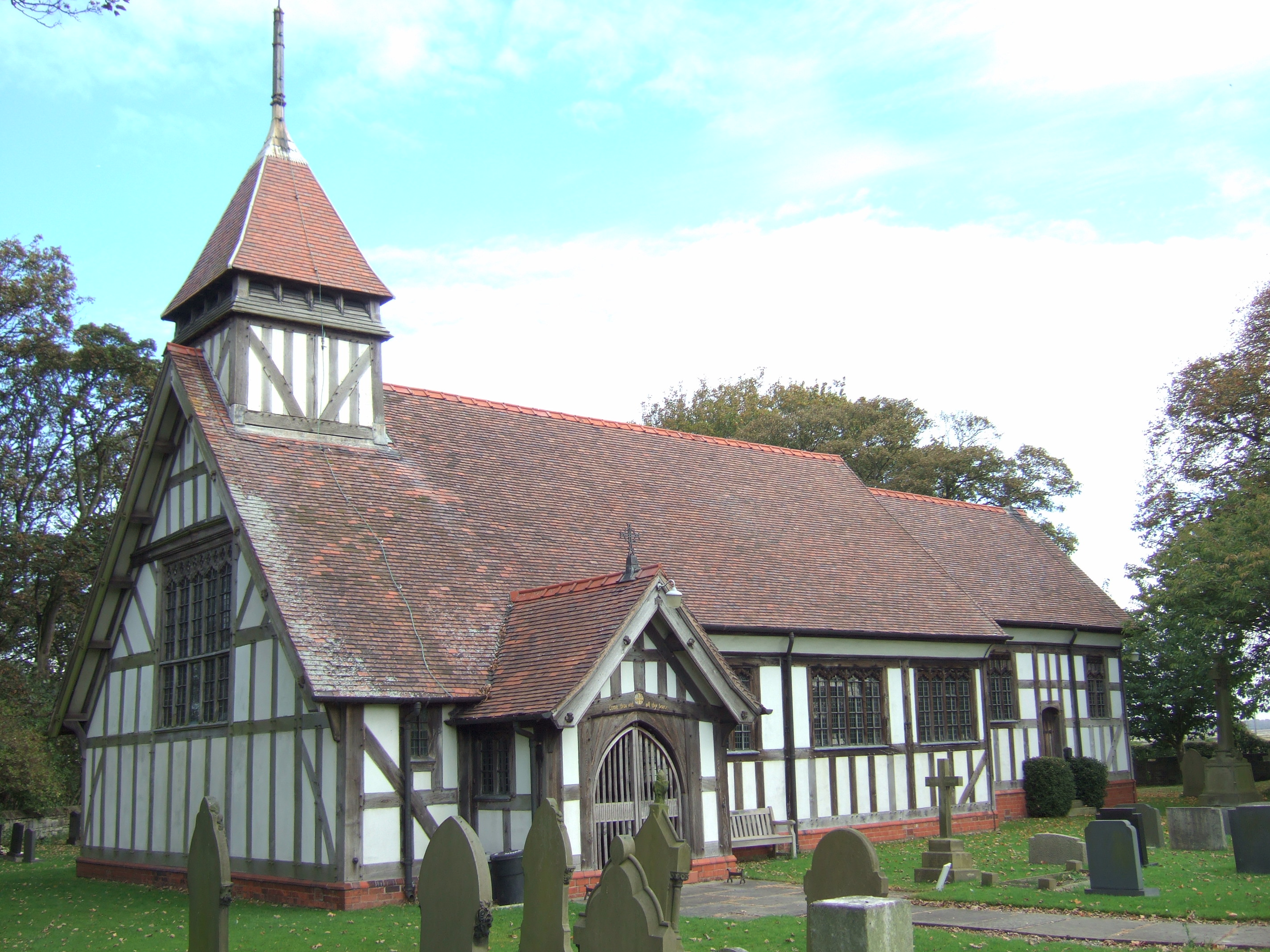
- Church from the southwest

- Location in West Lancashire
- OS grid reference: SD 320,065
- Location: Great Altcar, West Lancashire
- Country: England
- Denomination: Anglican
- Churchmanship: Central

History
- Status: Parish church
- Founder: William Molyneux, 4th Earl of Sefton
- Dedication: St Michael and All Angels

Architecture
- Functional status: Active
- Heritage designation: Grade II*
- Designated: 11 October 1968
- Architect: John Douglas
- Architectural type: Church
- Groundbreaking: 1878
- Completed: 1879

Specifications
- Materials: Timber framed, red tile roof

Administration
- Province: York
- Diocese: Liverpool
- Archdeaconry: Liverpool
- Deanery: Sefton North
- Parish: Altcar

St Michael and All Angels Church stands to the west of the village of Great Altcar, West Lancashire, England. The church is timber-framed and is recorded in the National Heritage List for England as a designated Grade II* listed building. It is an active Anglican parish church in the diocese of Liverpool, the archdeaconry of Liverpool and the deanery of Sefton. Its benefice is combined with that of Holy Trinity, Formby. In the Buildings of England series it is described as "an utterly charming church".

== History ==
The earliest record of a church or chapel on the site is in a lease dated 1429. In the 17th century the church is said to have been of timber and plaster. In the 1740s it was destroyed by fire and a new church was consecrated in 1747. This was said to have been a small brick building with a cupola containing one bell and a very plain interior. That church was demolished and the present church was built in 1878–79 to a design by John Douglas at the expense of the 4th Earl of Sefton. The church was restored in the 1990s, mainly to deal with rot which was affecting the timber.

== Architecture ==
=== Exterior ===
The church is half-timbered on a brick plinth with a red tile roof. The framing is mostly close studding with a middle rail. It has been suggested that timber framing was used, not only for aesthetic reasons, but also because the foundations on underlying peat were not sufficiently stable for a stone building. The plan of the church consists of a five-bay nave, a bell turret on the west gable end, a south porch, a narrow north aisle, a two-bay chancel at a lower level, a north organ chamber, and a vestry. The bell turret is close-studded and has a pyramidal roof with a finial and a weather vane. The church is unique in Douglas' output as being entirely half-timbered.

=== Interior ===
The communion rails, chancel rails, and pulpit were designed by Douglas and are of carved timber. The reredos consists of painted tiles, executed by Craven, Dunhill & Co. to designs by Heaton, Butler and Bayne. It depicts Christ breaking bread before Cleophas and Mary in the centre, St Michael on the left, and Euphrasia on the right. The only stained glass in the church is in the west window. This is dated 1885 and depicts the baptism of Jesus.

== External features ==
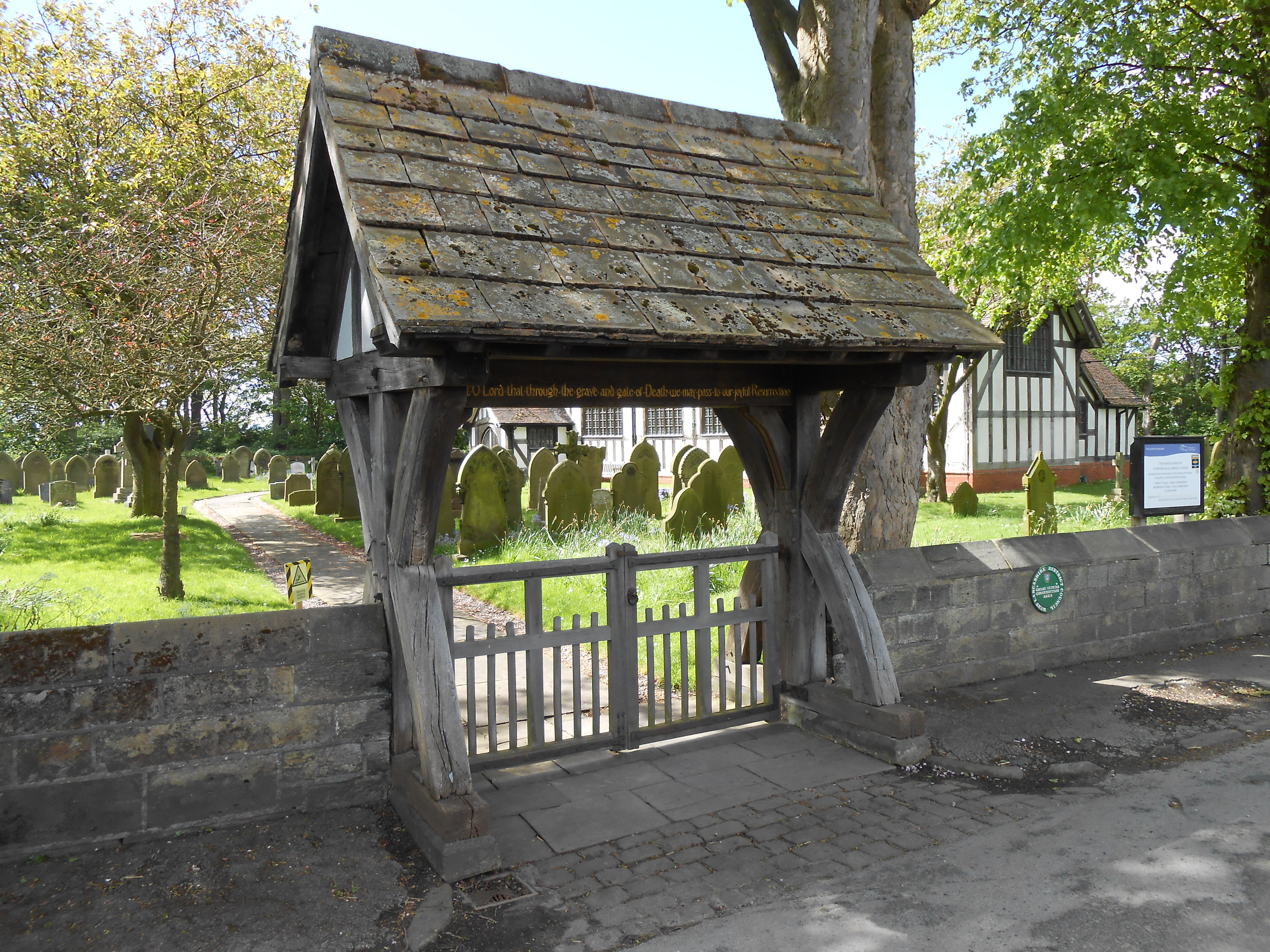
Lychgate

At the entrance to the churchyard is a lych gate dated 1879 which was also probably designed by Douglas. It is made of oak with a stone slate roof and is listed Grade II. The churchyard contains the war grave of a Royal Army Service Corps officer cadet of World War II, and of a Royal Air Force flight lieutenant killed in Afghanistan in 2006.

== See also ==
- Grade II* listed buildings in Lancashire
- Listed buildings in Great Altcar
- List of new churches by John Douglas
