= Aldford Iron Bridge =

Bridge in Aldford, Cheshire, England

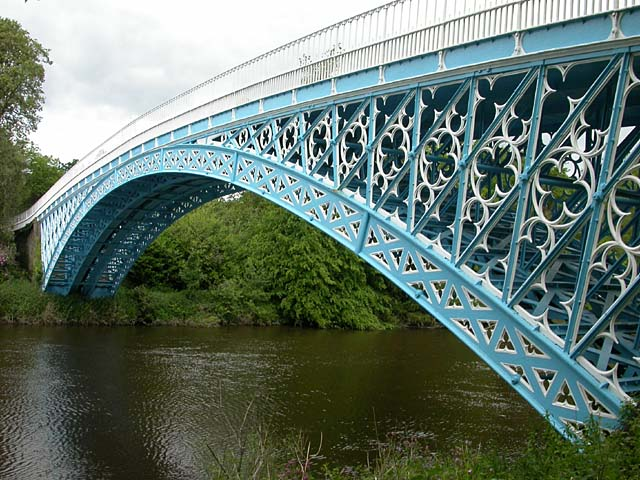
- Coordinates: 53°08′05″N 2°52′15″W
- Crosses: River Dee
- Locale: Aldford, Cheshire
- Heritage status: Grade I listed building

Characteristics
- Design: Arch bridge
- Material: Iron

History
- Architect: Thomas Telford
- Constructed by: William Hazledine
- Opened: 1824

Statistics
- Toll: None

Location
- Interactive map of Aldford Iron Bridge

Aldford Iron Bridge is a private bridge across the River Dee north of the village of Aldford, in Cheshire, north-west England. It links the village with Eaton Hall, the Duke of Westminster's country house. It forms part of the Buerton Approach to the hall (grid reference SJ418601). The bridge is a Grade I listed building, a status which provides legal protection from demolition or unsympathetic modification.

== Design ==
The bridge is a single arch of 150-foot (46-metre) span and 17 feet (5.2 metres) wide in cast iron. The arch is made from four ribs, each cast in seven segments. The spandrels are braced with ornate cruciform lattice work. The bridge has cast-iron railings on both sides and, at the crown, a pair of gates, also of cast iron and highly decorated. The bridge is supported by abutments in yellow sandstone which curve to terminate in octagonal piers.

In raised lettering on the bridge are the names of several of Telford's collaborators on the project: William Crosley (surveyor), William Shuttle (clerk of works), William Shuttle Junior (founder), and William Hazledine (contractor).

== History ==
Aldford Bridge crosses the River Dee just upstream from a ford from which the village of Aldford takes its name and which was formerly the point where the Roman Watling Street crossed the river.

The bridge was designed by Thomas Telford and built by William Hazledine for the 1st Marquis of Westminster and was completed in 1824. Telford and Hazeldine were frequent collaborators; they worked together on multiple iron bridges, including the Pontcysyllte Aqueduct (a World Heritage Site).

Edwin Jervoise, in his survey of historic bridges for the Society for the Protection of Ancient Buildings in the 1920s, called Aldford Bridge "probably the most elegant iron bridge in existence".

The bridge provides a crossing over the river for the long-distance footpath of the Marches Way.

== See also ==
- Grade I listed buildings in Cheshire West and Chester
- Listed buildings in Aldford
