= List of works by John Douglas =

John Douglas was an architect who practised from an office in Chester, Cheshire, England.

Lists of his works can be found at:

- List of new churches by John Douglas
- List of church restorations, amendments and furniture by John Douglas
- List of houses and associated buildings by John Douglas
- List of non-ecclesiastical and non-residential works by John Douglas
