= 2–18 St Werburgh Street, Chester =

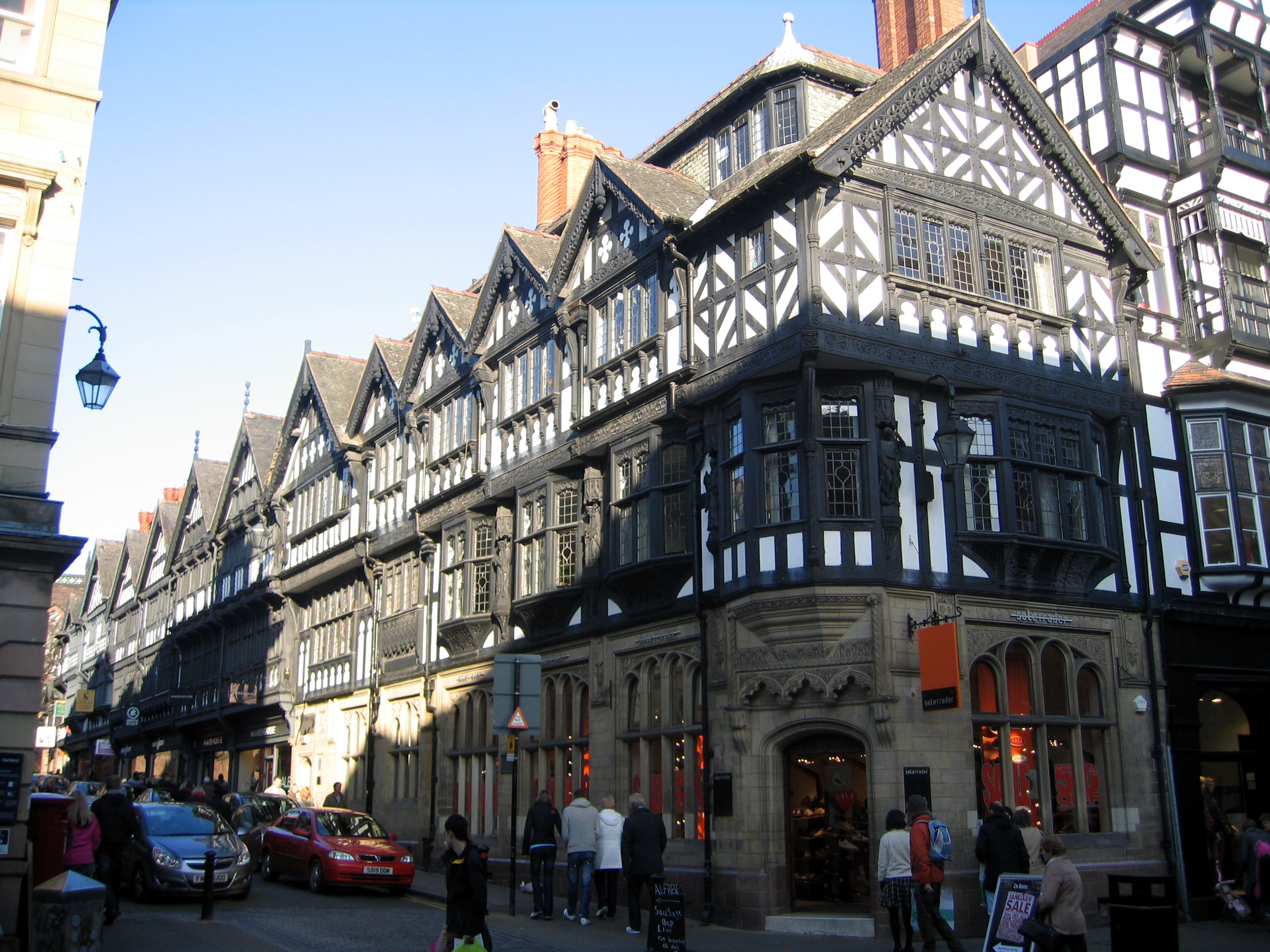
- East side of St Werburgh Street seen from Eastgate Street

- Location in Cheshire
- 53.1910°N 2.8898°W
- Location: Chester, Cheshire, England

History
- Built: c. 1895–97

Site notes
- Architect: John Douglas
- Architectural style: Black-and-white Revival

Listed Building – Grade II*
- Designated: 23 May 1967
- Reference no.: 1376389

2–18 St Werburgh Street is a terrace consisting of a bank, shops and offices on the east side of St Werburgh Street and the north side of Eastgate Street, Chester, Cheshire, England. The terrace is recorded in the National Heritage List for England as a designated Grade II* listed building.

== History ==
In the 1890s, the Chester City Council decided to widen St Werburgh Street, which leads from Eastgate Street to Chester Cathedral, and arranged for the demolition of a row of old shops on its east side. The council intended to sell the vacant land in separate lots, but Chester architect John Douglas bought the entire length of the east side of the street and planned to create a series of buildings in a unified architectural design. Douglas originally intended to construct the buildings in stone with brick diapering in Gothic style. However, he was persuaded by the Duke of Westminster to include black-and-white half-timbering in his design. The terrace was constructed around 1895–97 at a cost of over £17,000 (equivalent to £1,910,000 in 2025). The building at the south end, on the corner of Eastgate Street, was the first to be occupied. It was acquired by the Bank of Liverpool, and the other units were used as shops. Twelve years after Douglas' death, a commemorative plaque was placed on the St Werburgh Street side of the bank by some of his former pupils and assistants.

== Architecture ==
The terrace is constructed in three storeys, plus attics, with roofs of green Westmorland slate. There is one bay facing Eastgate Street and nine bays along St Werburgh Street. The ground floor of the bank is built in yellow sandstone on a granite plinth; the piers between the shops are in sandstone. The upper storeys are all half-timbered. The Eastgate Street face of the bank has a four-light mullioned and transomed window with a basket arch on the ground floor. On the first floor is a five-light oriel window, above this is a six-light window with casements and the whole is surmounted by a gable with a carved bargeboard. Set at an angle on the corner between the streets is the doorway with a moulded basket arch over which are three ogee arches. Curving round the corner on the first floor is a three-light window.

Along St Werburgh Street, the first five ground floor bays are in stone, and the rest have modern shop fronts. The first floor has a variety of windows, some of them oriels; the second floor also has windows; these are in plainer design. Between the first and second floors is a carved bressummer. The whole front is topped by eleven gables of varying sizes. At the north end of the terrace is a turret with an octagonal spire surmounted by a lead finial with a weathervane. Rising from the roof are brick decorated chimney stacks. The upper storeys display "an unbroken expanse of gorgeously ornamented half-timber", and include carvings of Norman earls, saints (including St Werburgh), and Queen Victoria.

== Critique ==
Douglas' biographer Edward Hubbard considered that in this piece of work, Chester's "half-timber revival reached its very apogee." In the Buildings of England series, Pevsner and Hubbard state "The composition is Douglas at his best (though also at his showiest)." It is "undoubtedly Douglas's greatest work in Chester and the high point of the Victorian black and white revival in the city."

== See also ==
- Grade II* listed buildings in Cheshire West and Chester
- List of non-ecclesiastical and non-residential works by John Douglas
