= St Paul's Church, Boughton =

Coordinates: 53.1919°N 2.8724°W

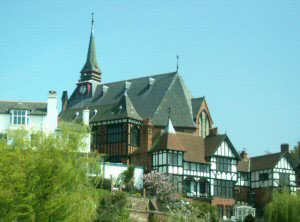
- St Paul's Church, Boughton, from the southeast

- Location in Cheshire
- OS grid reference: SJ 418 665
- Location: Chester, Cheshire
- Country: England
- Denomination: Anglican
- Churchmanship: Open Evangelical Charismatic

History
- Status: Parish church

Architecture
- Functional status: Defunct
- Heritage designation: Grade II*
- Designated: 10 January 1972
- Architect: John Douglas
- Architectural type: Church
- Style: Gothic Revival
- Completed: 1905
- Closed: 2016

Specifications
- Materials: Red brick with stone dressings; timber framing Slate roofs

Administration
- Province: York
- Diocese: Chester
- Parish: St Paul, Chester

St Paul's Church overlooks the River Dee in Boughton, Chester, Cheshire, England. The church is recorded in the National Heritage List for England as a designated Grade II* listed building, and, before its closure, was an Anglican parish church in the diocese of Chester, the archdeaconry of Chester and the deanery of that diocese. In the series Buildings of England, the architectural historian Nikolaus Pevsner stated that he regarded it as "the boldest of Douglas' church designs".

It ceased to be a church in 2016, when it was closed by the Diocese, as it was found to be in very bad repair. It was named by the Victorian Society as one of the Top Ten Heritage Buildings at Risk for 2016.

== History ==
The first church on the site was built in 1830 in stuccoed brick. Its style was Italianate with round-headed windows and a northwest campanile. The architect was William Cole the younger. It was virtually rebuilt in 1876 to a design by John Douglas, who added the south aisle in 1902, and the spire in 1905.

== Architecture ==
=== Exterior ===
The church is built in red brick with stone dressings and in timber framing with brick and plaster panels. The roof has grey and grey-green slates. Its plan consists of a through nave and chancel of four bays plus an apsidal bay, a south aisle, a west porch and a broach spire at the west end. Most of the windows are lancets.

=== Interior ===
Pevsner commented that the strength of the interior lies in its timber-work. The walls are decorated with stencilled patterns in the Arts and Crafts manner. The wrought iron screen is by Douglas. The stained glass dated 1887 in the north aisle is by Kempe and that in the baptistry is by Frampton. The rest of the stained glass was made by Morris & Co. Two of the windows were designed by Burne-Jones, others by Morris himself, and the latest windows dating from 1925 to 1927 are by Henry Dearle. The reredos is a war memorial dated 1920 by H. G. Hiller. Also in the church is a monument from the older church dated 1845. The three-manual organ was built by James J. Binns of Leeds.

== See also ==
- Grade II* listed buildings in Cheshire West and Chester
- List of church restorations, amendments and furniture by John Douglas
