= Aldford Brook =

Stream in Cheshire, England

Coordinates: 53.136093°N 2.869519°W

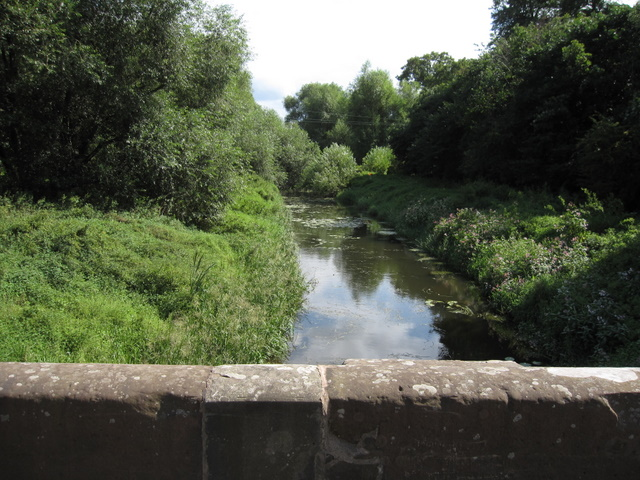
Aldford Brook south of Aldford Bridge

Aldford Brook is a short river in Cheshire, England. It is a tributary of the River Dee, and joins the Dee at the village of Aldford.

Rising at an altitude of around 78m, just to the south west of Malpas the stream flows generally north past Tilston and Coddington before turning north west towards Aldford. Along its way the stream is successively known as Carden Brook and Coddington Brook, and only known as Aldford Brook for its final 4 kilometres (2.5 mi) or so.

Tributaries include Golbourne Brook, Aldersey Brook, Mere Brook, and Hook's Brook.

An important water mill is still in operation at Stretton.
