= Aldford =

Village in Cheshire, England

Coordinates: 53.126°N 2.866°W

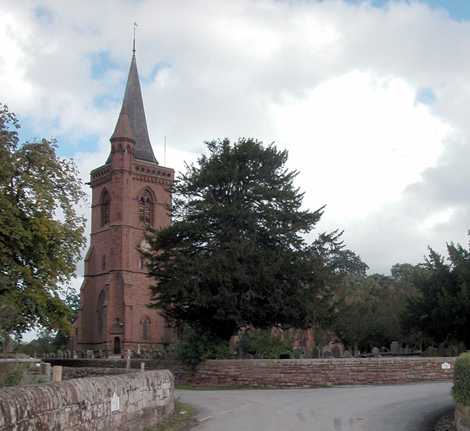
- St John's Church

- Location within Cheshire
- Population: 272 (2011 census)
- OS grid reference: SJ420592
- Civil parish: Aldford and Saighton
- Unitary authority: Cheshire West and Chester
- Ceremonial county: Cheshire
- Region: North West
- Country: England
- Sovereign state: United Kingdom
- Post town: CHESTER
- Postcode district: CH3
- Dialling code: 01244
- Police: Cheshire
- Fire: Cheshire
- Ambulance: North West
- UK Parliament: Chester South and Eddisbury

Aldford is a village and former civil parish, now in the parish of Aldford and Saighton, in the Cheshire West and Chester district, in the ceremonial county of Cheshire, England. (grid reference SJ420592). The village is approximately 6.5 miles (10.5 km) to the south of Chester, on the east bank of the River Dee. The Aldford Brook joins the Dee just north of the village.

In the 2001 census, the population of the parish was 213. The population of the civil parish was recorded as 272 in the 2011 census.

== History ==
The name Aldford means "Old Ford" and likely derives from Old English.

Aldford Castle dates back over 800 years.

The village was a township in Broxton Hundred. A civil parish from 1866, it was abolished on 1 April 2015 to form Aldford and Saighton civil parish. The population was 331 in 1801, rising to 521 in 1851, then 113 in 1901 and decreasing to 96 by 1951.

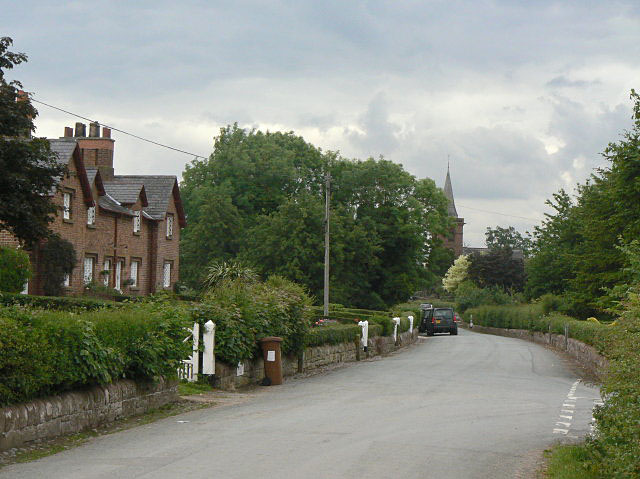
School Lane

Between 1960 and 1991, the village was the location of a Royal Observer Corps monitoring bunker, to be used in the event of a nuclear attack. No trace of the bunker remains today.

== Landmarks ==
Most of the building stock was constructed as a designed village in the middle of the 19th century by Sir Richard Grosvenor, 2nd Marquess of Westminster, in almost rectangular form. A number of buildings in the village were designed by the architect John Douglas. These include the Grade II listed St John's church and the Grosvenor Arms public house.

The River Dee outside the village is crossed by the Aldford Iron Bridge, which was built in 1824 by William Hazledine for the 1st Marquis. Iron Bridge Lodge, adjacent to this bridge, was designed by Douglas & Fordham in 1894 and is listed Grade II.

Aldford Hall and the Roman road Watling Street are outside the village.

== See also ==
- Listed buildings in Aldford
