= Walmoor Hill =

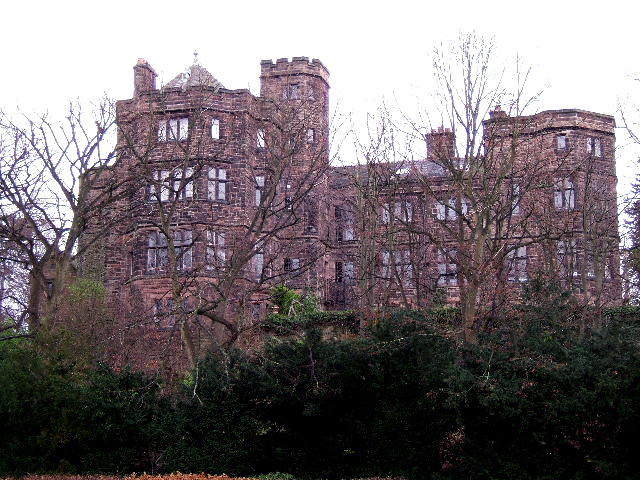
- West front of Walmoor Hill overlooking the river

- Location in Cheshire
- 53.1872°N 2.8687°W
- Location: Chester, Cheshire, England
- OS grid reference: SJ 420 657

History
- Built: 1896

Site notes
- Architect: John Douglas

Listed Building – Grade II*
- Designated: 10 January 1972
- Reference no.: 1375760

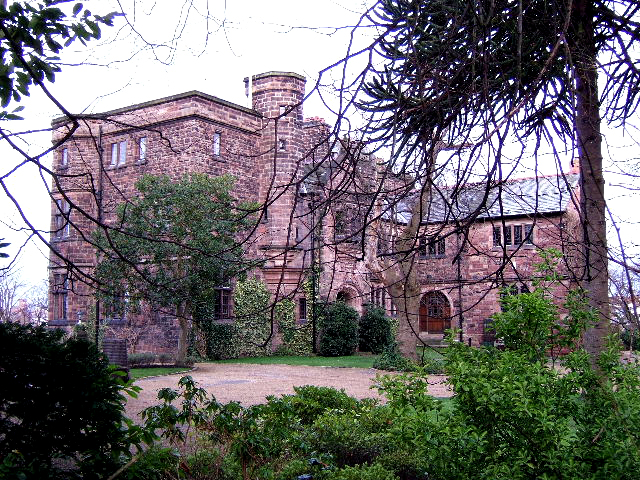
Walmoor Hill from the southeast showing the entrance porch

Walmoor Hill is a large house in an elevated position overlooking the River Dee on the west side of Dee Banks, Chester, Cheshire, England. It is recorded in the National Heritage List for England as a designated Grade II* listed building. The authors of the Buildings of England series describe it as a "house of considerable size and panache".

== History ==
The house was built by the Chester architect John Douglas for his own use. It was built in the 1890s and, although bearing the date 1896, its service wing was never completed. Because of its large size and prominent position it was popularly known as "Douglas' Castle" or "Douglas' Folly". Douglas lived in the house from about 1901 until his death in 1911. Following this, his son Sholto continued to live in there but had left it by 1918. It became a girls' school, Walmoor College. A 1935 publication shows it as Hampton House School, Walmoor Hill, a boarding and day school for boys under the headmastership of a D.P. Saunders-Griffiths, M.A. (Oxon.). It was later the headquarters of the Cheshire Fire Brigade. Its use by the fire service ended in 1997.

== Architecture ==
The house is built in red sandstone with a grey-green slate roof. It is Elizabethan in style and has a T-shaped plan. The main wing is elaborate and overlooks the river to the west; the unfinished servants' wing is simpler and looks to the north. The entrance faces the east. The entrance porch has two storeys with an arched entrance and an oriel window above it. The room above the porch was used by Douglas as an oratory or chapel. To the left is a squat three-storey tower and between the two is an octagonal corbelled stair-turret. To the right of the entrance porch the house continues for two bays leading to the servants' wing at right angles. These are in two storeys with mullioned windows.

The west front has a massive appearance with a three-storey bay to the north. This has mullioned and transomed canted windows, a crenellated parapet and a pyramidal roof. To its right is an octagonal four-storey crenellated tower. To the south of this the house continues for three bays in two storeys and at the south is a three-storey bay, again with mullioned and transomed canted windows, but with a plain parapet. The monograms "JD" and "STD" (for Sholto Theodore Douglas) appear on the building. On the staircase is a stained glass window commemorating Captain Richard Douglas who died in the Peninsular War.

== See also ==
- Grade II* listed buildings in Cheshire West and Chester
- List of houses and associated buildings by John Douglas
