= Great Altcar =

Village in Lancashire, England

Coordinates: 53.549°N 3.021°W

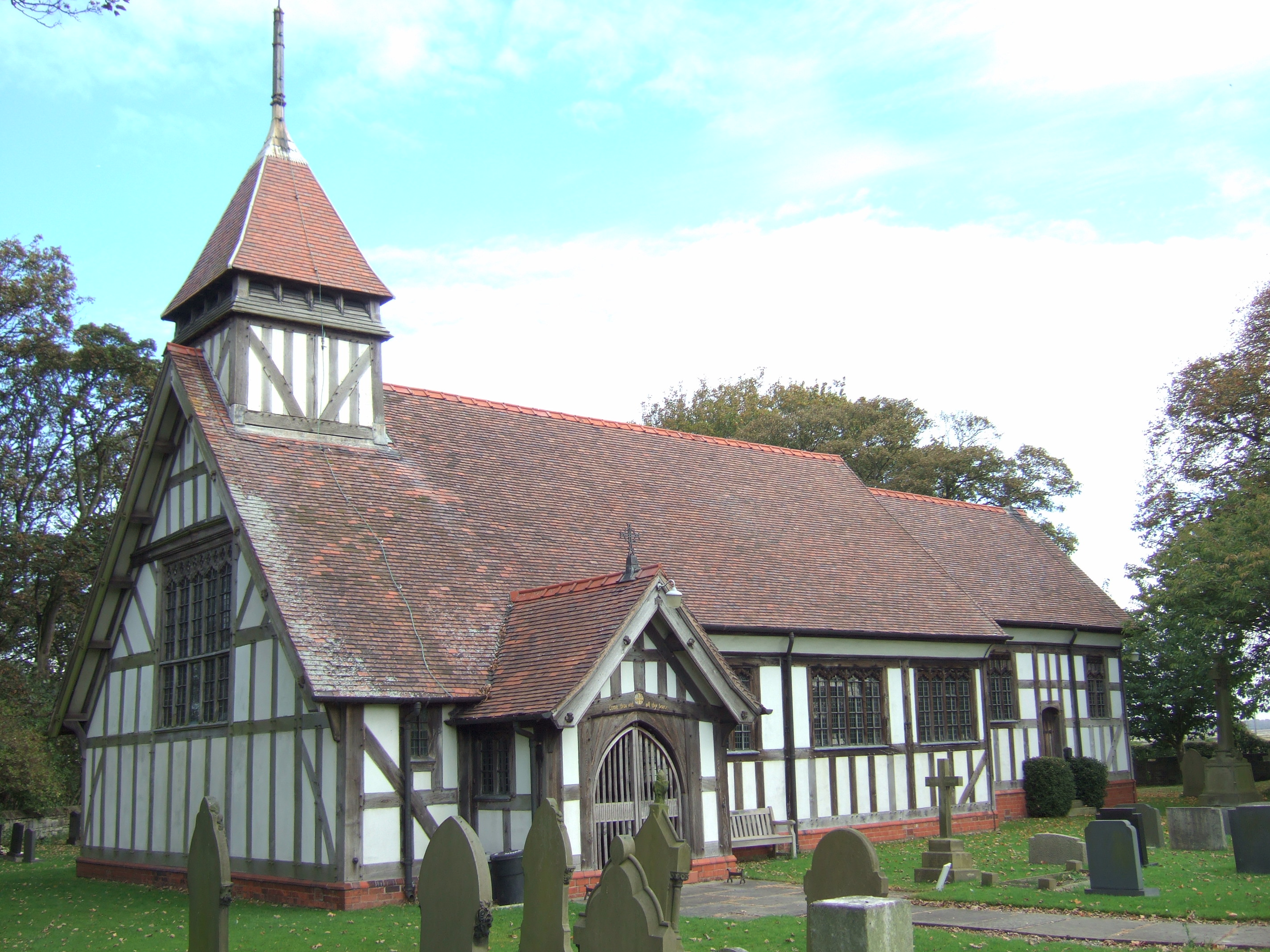
- Church of St Michael and All Angels, a local landmark

- Location in West Lancashire Location within Lancashire
- Population: 213 (2011)
- OS grid reference: SD323063
- Civil parish: Great Altcar
- District: West Lancashire
- Shire county: Lancashire
- Region: North West
- Country: England
- Sovereign state: United Kingdom
- Post town: LIVERPOOL
- Postcode district: L37
- Dialling code: 01704
- Police: Lancashire
- Fire: Lancashire
- Ambulance: North West
- UK Parliament: West Lancashire

Great Altcar is a village and civil parish in West Lancashire, England, close to Formby on the West Lancashire Coastal Plain. The population as taken at the 2011 census was 213. The name Altcar is Norse meaning "marsh by the Alt". The church of St Michael and All Angels is a timber framed structure dating from 1879.

The area is now intensively farmed. An area called The Moss is situated to the north, and is characterized by drainage dykes.

Altcar hosted hare coursing's Waterloo Cup from 1836 to 2005, originally with the patronage of William Philip Molyneux, 2nd Earl of Sefton. Altcar Training Camp, established in 1860, is actually in Hightown.

== Geography ==
Great Altcar is on the B5195 road. It was served by Altcar and Hillhouse railway station on the Cheshire Lines Committee Southport & Cheshire Lines Extension Railway Southport Extension until July 1952.

== See also ==
- Listed buildings in Great Altcar
- Little Altcar
