= John Douglas (English architect) =

English architect (1830–1911)

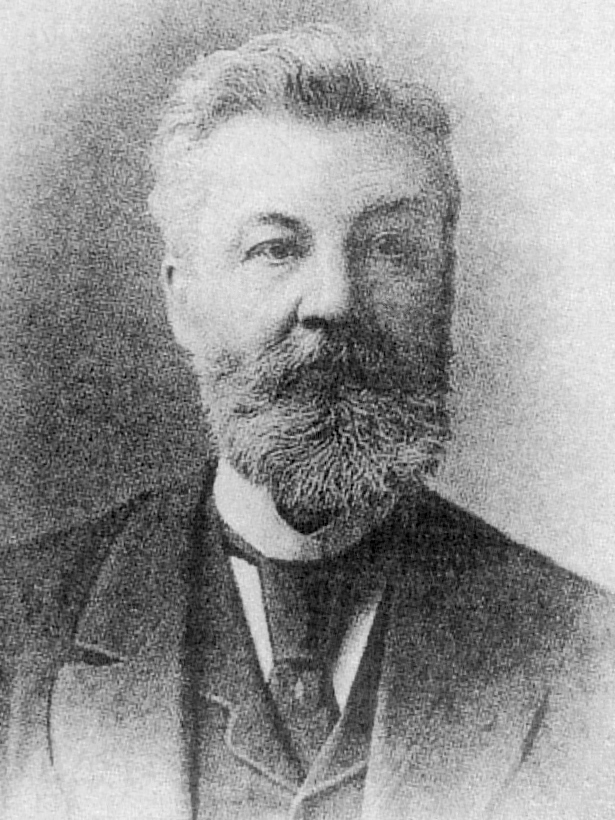
- John Douglas, photograph published in 1890
- Born: 11 April 1830; Sandiway, Cheshire, England
- Died: 23 May 1911 (aged 81); Walmoor Hill, Chester, Cheshire, England
- Resting place: Overleigh old cemetery, Chester
- Education: Articled to E. G. Paley
- Occupation: Architect
- Spouse: Elizabeth Edmunds
- Children: 5

John Douglas (11 April 1830 – 23 May 1911) was an English architect who designed over 500 buildings in Cheshire, North Wales, and northwest England, particularly on the Eaton Hall estate. He was trained in Lancaster and practised throughout his career from an office in Chester. Initially he ran the practice on his own, but from 1884 until two years before his death he worked in partnerships with two of his former assistants.

Douglas's output included new churches, restoration and renovation of existing churches, church furnishings, new houses and alterations to existing houses, and a variety of other buildings, including shops, banks, offices, schools, memorials and public buildings. His architectural styles were eclectic. Douglas worked during the period of the Gothic Revival, and many of his works incorporate elements of the English Gothic style. He was also influenced by architectural styles from the mainland of Europe and included elements of French, German and Dutch architecture. However, he is probably best remembered for his incorporation of vernacular elements in his buildings, in particular half-timbering, influenced by the black-and-white revival in Chester. Other vernacular elements he incorporated include tile-hanging, pargeting and the use of decorative brick in diapering and the design of tall chimney stacks. Of particular importance is Douglas's use of joinery and highly detailed wood carving.

Throughout his career he attracted commissions from wealthy landowners and industrialists, especially the Grosvenor family of Eaton Hall. Most of his works have survived, particularly his churches. The city of Chester contains a number of his structures, the most admired of which are his half-timbered black-and-white buildings and the Eastgate Clock. The highest concentration of his work is found in the Eaton Hall estate and the surrounding villages of Eccleston, Aldford and Pulford.

== Biography ==
=== Early life and training ===
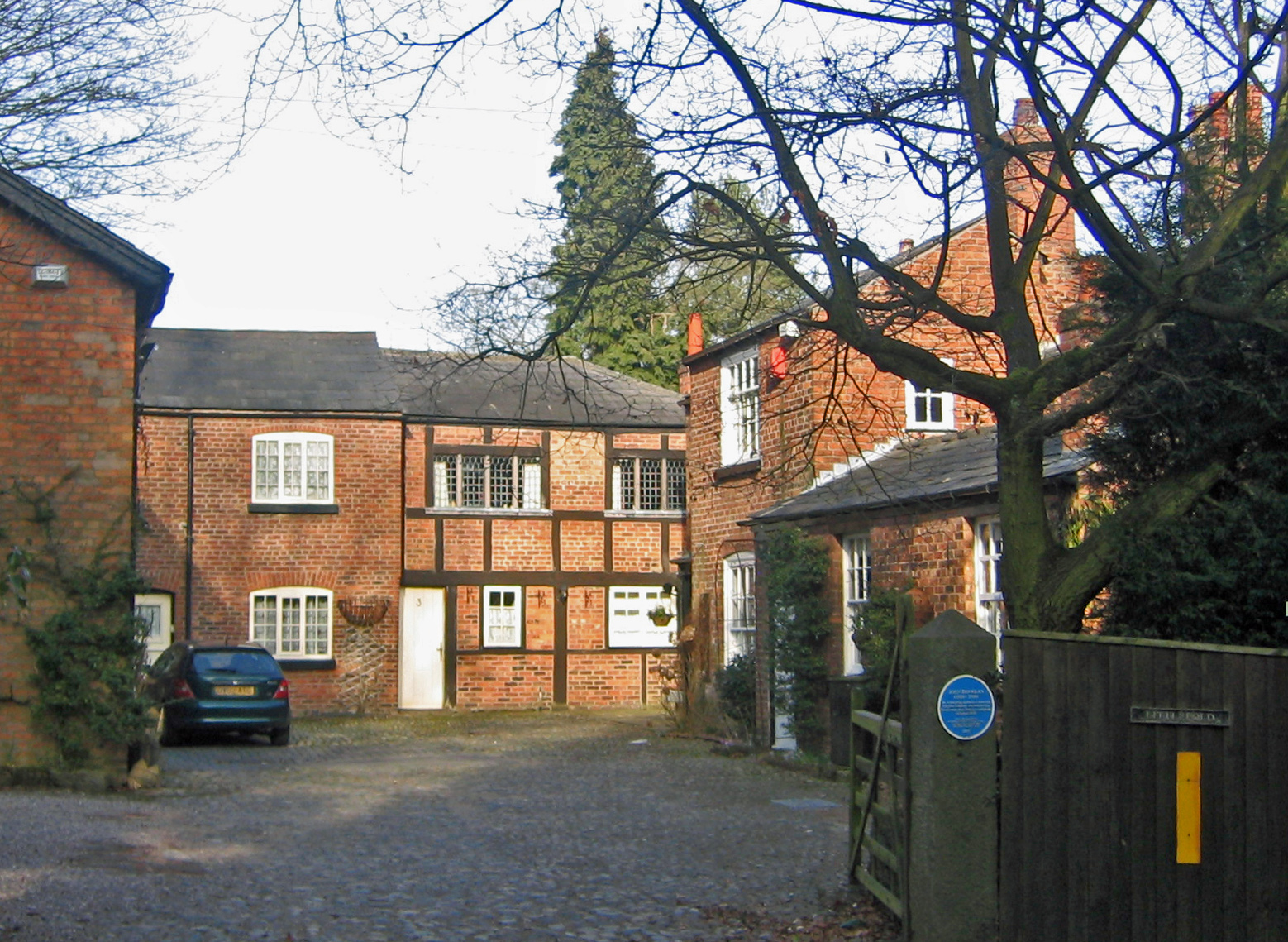
Park Cottage, Sandiway, the birthplace of John Douglas

John Douglas was born at Park Cottage, Sandiway, Cheshire, on 11 April 1830 and baptised on 16 May 1830 at St Mary's Church, Weaverham. He was the second of the four children, and the only son, of John Douglas and his wife Mary née Swindley. John Douglas senior was born in Northampton about 1798–1800 and his wife was born in Aldford, a village on the Eaton estate in Cheshire; her father was the village blacksmith at Eccleston, another village in the Eaton estate. John Douglas senior was by trade a builder and joiner, and also described himself as a surveyor and a timber merchant. In 1835 he acted as architect for a house at Hartford, a village between Sandiway and Northwich. At the time of the 1851 census he was employing 48 men. He owned land in Sandiway, and a house and land in the neighbouring village of Cuddington.

Nothing is known of John Douglas junior's school education. He gained knowledge and experience in his father's building yard and workshop which were attached to the family house. In the mid or late 1840s he was articled to E. G. Paley, of Sharpe and Paley, architects in Lancaster, Lancashire. When his articles were completed, Douglas became Paley's chief assistant. In either 1855 or 1860 he established his own office at No. 6 Abbey Square, Chester.

=== Family and personal life ===
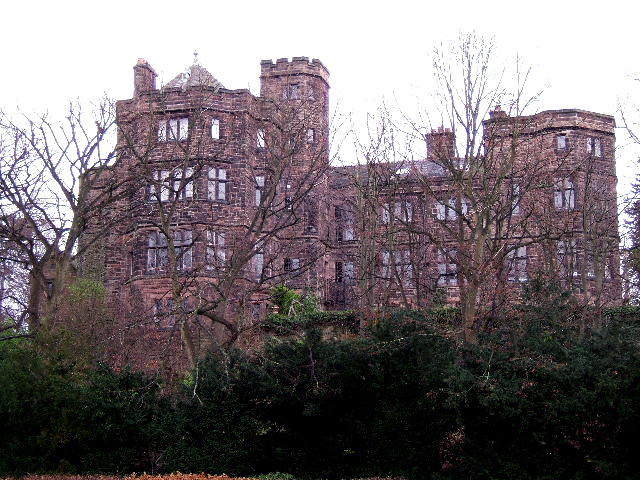
Walmoor Hill, the house Douglas built for himself

Douglas's elder sister, Elizabeth, was born in 1827. His younger sisters were Mary Hannah and Emma, who were born in 1832 and 1834 respectively. Mary Hannah died five months before Emma's birth, and Emma herself died in 1848. Douglas married Elizabeth Edmunds, a farmer's daughter from Bangor-is-y-Coed, Flintshire, on 25 January 1860 in St Dunawd's Church in the village, a church he was later to restore. Initially the couple lived over the office at 6 Abbey Square, and later they moved next door to No. 4. Their five children were born in these houses, John Percy in 1861, Colin Edmunds in 1864, Mary Elizabeth in 1866, Sholto Theodore the following year, and Jerome in 1869. Only two of the children survived to adulthood; Mary Elizabeth died from scarlet fever in 1868, Jerome lived for only a few days, and John Percy died aged 12 in 1873.

About 1876 the family moved to live at 31 and 33 Dee Banks, Chester, one of a pair of semi-detached houses overlooking the River Dee, which were built by Douglas. His wife died in 1878 from laryngitis after a year's illness. Douglas did not remarry. His son Colin trained as an architect and worked in Douglas's office but died in 1887 at the age of 23 from consumption. His other son Sholto is not known to have had any profession but he was a heavy drinker of alcohol. During the 1890s Douglas built a large house for himself, Walmoor Hill, also at Dee Banks overlooking the river. Here he lived until his death on 23 May 1911 at the age of 81. His funeral was held at Overleigh old cemetery, Chester, where he was buried. The following Sunday a memorial service was held at St John the Evangelist's Church, Sandiway. His estate amounted to a little over £32,000 (equivalent to £3,120,000 in 2023). Apart from his surviving buildings, only two memorials remain to his memory. One is a tablet in St Paul's Church, Boughton, the church in which he worshipped and which he had rebuilt. The other is a plaque placed on one of his buildings in St Werburgh Street, Chester, in 1923 by his pupils and assistants.

== Practice and personality ==
Douglas practised on his own until 1884, when his son, Colin, became ill. He then took Daniel Porter Fordham into partnership and practised as Douglas & Fordham. Fordham was born around 1846 and had been an assistant in Douglas's office since at least 1872. In 1898, having developed consumption, Fordham retired from the practice and went to live in Bournemouth where he died the following year. He was replaced as partner by Charles Howard Minshull, who had been born in Chester in 1858 and who became articled to Douglas in 1874; the practice became Douglas & Minshull. During the first decade of the 20th century, Douglas became less active but, for reasons which are unknown, the partnership was dissolved in 1909. The practice returned to the title of John Douglas, Architect. Minshull went into partnership with E. J. Muspratt in Foregate Street, Chester. When Douglas died, this partnership worked from the Abbey Square address as Douglas, Minshull & Muspratt.

Little is known about Douglas's private life and personality. Only two images of him are known to survive. One is a photograph taken in later middle age. The other is a caricature sketch made by an assistant in his office. This shows him in old age, bowed, bent and bespectacled, carrying a portfolio and an ear trumpet. According to architectural historian Edward Hubbard, Douglas's life "seems to have been one of thorough devotion to architecture ... which may well have been intensified by the death of his wife and other domestic worries". His obituary in the Chester Chronicle stated that he "lived heart and soul in his profession".

Douglas was a dedicated Christian who regularly attended his local church, St Paul's Church, Boughton, a church he rebuilt. His house, Walmoor Hill, included an oratory. He also had a "strong sense of national loyalty", incorporating statues of Queen Victoria in niches at Walmoor Hill and in his buildings in St Werburgh Street, Chester. Douglas was not good at handling the financial matters of his practice. The Duke of Westminster's secretary wrote of him in 1884, "A good architect but a poor hand at accounts!". Delay in presenting his accounts often led to difficulties and confusion; such delay sometimes amounted to as much as ten years. Otherwise very little is known about his personal life. No family papers have survived and none of the documents from the office at 6 Abbey Square has been found.

== Styles and practice ==
=== Output and patronage ===
Douglas designed some 500 buildings. He built at least 40 new churches or chapels, restored, altered or made additions to many other churches, and designed fittings and furniture for the interiors of churches. He designed new houses, altered or made additions to others, and built various structures associated with those houses. Douglas's works also included farms, shops, offices, hotels, a hospital, drinking fountains, clocks, schools, public baths, a library, a bridge, an obelisk, cheese factories, and public conveniences. As his office was in Chester, most of his works were in Cheshire and North Wales, although some were further afield, in Lancashire, Staffordshire, Warwickshire and Scotland.

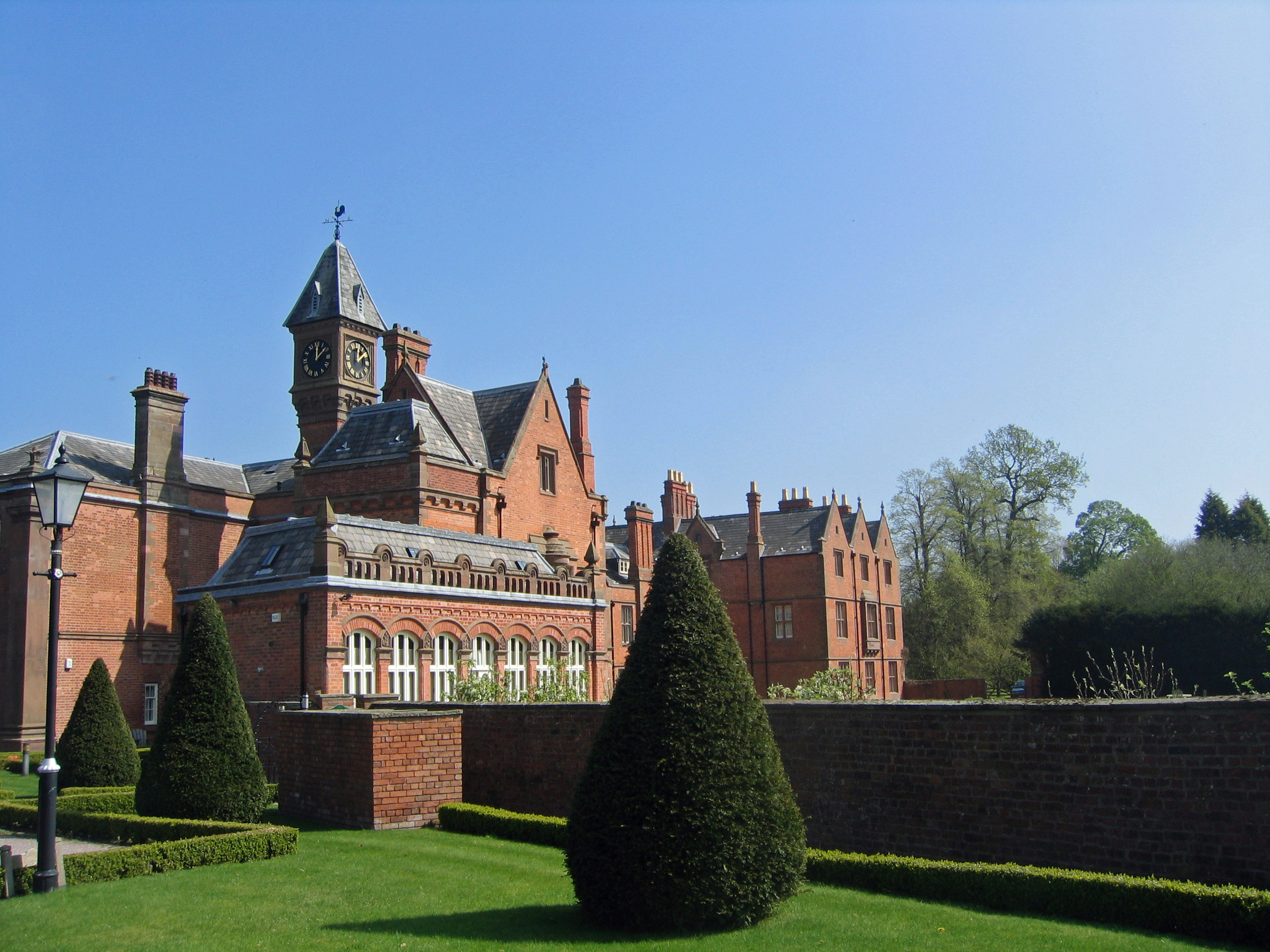
Vale Royal Abbey showing the part of the south wing added by Douglas

Throughout his career Douglas attracted commissions from wealthy and important patrons. His first-known independent work was an ornament, which is no longer in existence, for the garden of the Honourable Mrs Cholmondeley. She was the sister-in-law of Hugh Cholmondeley, 2nd Baron Delamere, and it was from the 2nd Baron that Douglas received his first major commission, a considerable rebuilding of the south wing of his seat at Vale Royal Abbey in 1860. Around the same time, Lord Delamere commissioned him to build the church of St John the Evangelist at Over, Winsford, as a memorial to his first wife.

Douglas's most important patrons were the Grosvenor family of Eaton Hall, Cheshire. In 1865 he was commissioned to design the entrance lodge and other structures for Grosvenor Park in Chester, and St John's Church in the village of Aldford in the Eaton Hall estate for Richard Grosvenor, 2nd Marquess of Westminster. When the marquess died in 1869 he was succeeded by his son Hugh Grosvenor, 1st Duke of Westminster. Douglas received a large number of commissions from the 1st Duke and from his son, the 2nd Duke, throughout his career. It is estimated that for the 1st Duke alone he designed four churches and chapels, eight parsonages and large houses, about 15 schools, around 50 farms (in whole or in part), about 300 cottages, lodges and smithies, two factories, two inns and about 12 commercial buildings on the Eaton Hall estate alone. He also designed buildings on the duke's Halkyn estate in Flintshire, including another church.

Other wealthy landowners who commissioned work from Douglas included William Molyneux, 4th Earl of Sefton, Francis Egerton, 3rd Earl of Ellesmere, George Cholmondeley, 5th Marquess of Cholmondeley, Rowland Egerton-Warburton of Arley Hall, Cheshire, and in Wales, the family of Lord Kenyon, and the Gladstone family, including W. E Gladstone. He also received commissions from industrialists, including John & Thomas Johnson, soap and alkali manufacturers from Runcorn, Richard Muspratt, a chemical industrialist from Flint, Flintshire, and W. H. Lever, soap manufacturer and creator of the village of Port Sunlight.

=== Styles ===
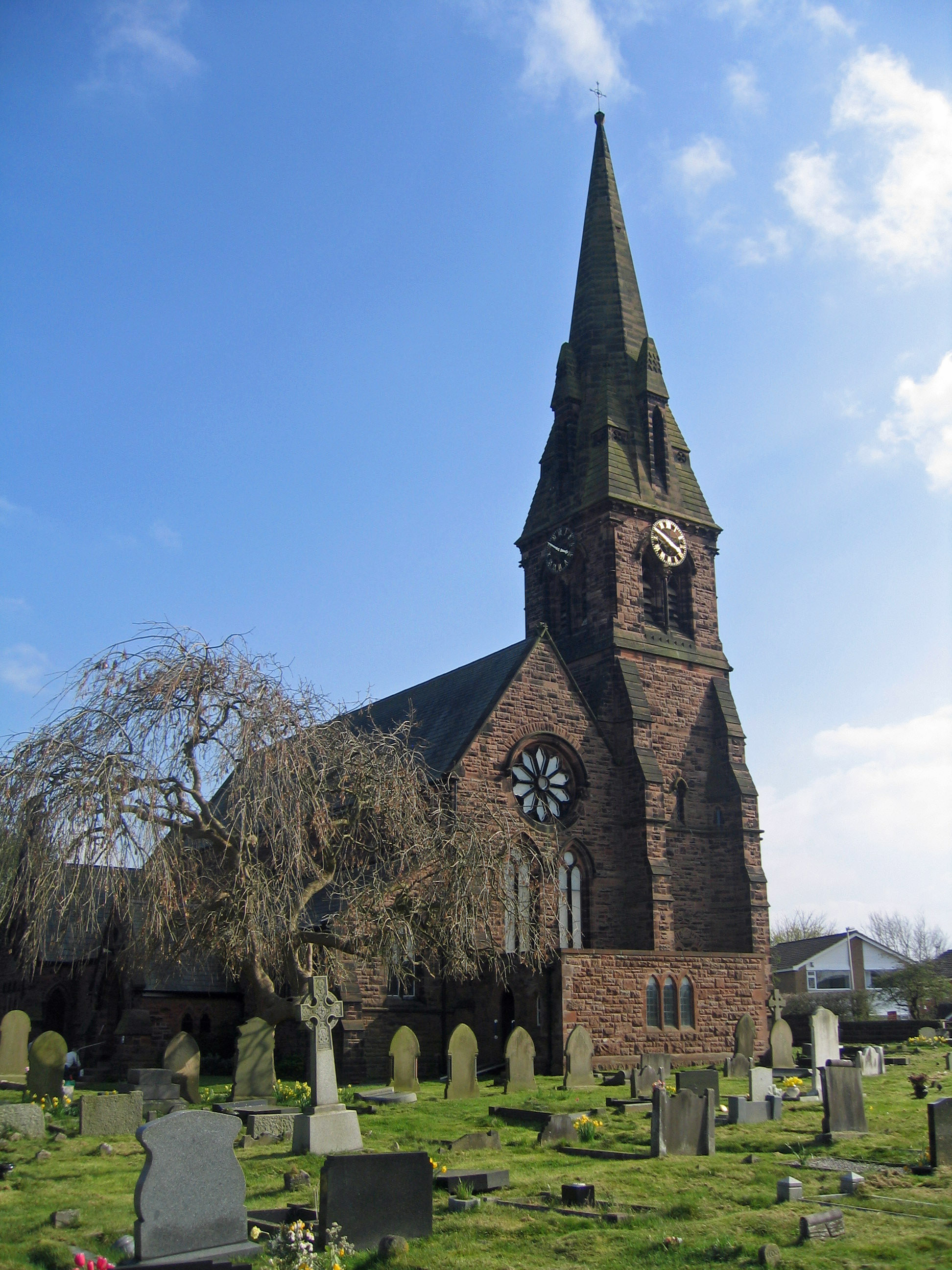
St John's Church, Over, Winsford

Although the firm where Douglas received his training was in a provincial city in the north of England, it was at the forefront of the Gothic Revival in the country. The Gothic Revival was a reaction against the neoclassical style, which had been popular in the 18th and early 19th centuries, and it incorporated features of the Gothic style of the Middle Ages. Both Edmund Sharpe and E. G. Paley had been influenced by the Cambridge Camden Society and, more specifically, by A. W. N Pugin who believed that "Gothic was the only correct and Christian way to build". Sharpe had also been influenced by Thomas Rickman, and he had written papers on medieval scholarship himself. Paley had been influenced by his brother, Frederick Apthorp Paley, who was enthusiastic about Gothic architecture, and who had also been influenced by Rickman. During the time Douglas was working in Lancaster the firm was responsible for building and restoring churches in Gothic Revival style, one of which was St Wilfrid's Church in the Cheshire village of Davenham, some 3 miles (5 km) from Sandiway. Douglas's first church, that of St John the Evangelist at Over, Winsford, was entirely English Gothic in style, more specifically Early Decorated.

Douglas's influences were not from England alone. Although he never travelled abroad, he incorporated Gothic styles from continental countries, especially Germany and France. This combination of Gothic styles contributed to what has come to be known as the High Victorian style. Its features include a sense of massiveness, steep roofs which are frequently hipped, round turrets with conical roofs, pinnacles, heavy corbel tables, and the use of polychromism. Many of Douglas's works, especially his earlier ones, are High Victorian in style, or incorporate High Victorian features. One characteristic feature of Douglas's work is the inclusion of dormer windows rising through the eaves and surmounted by hipped roofs.

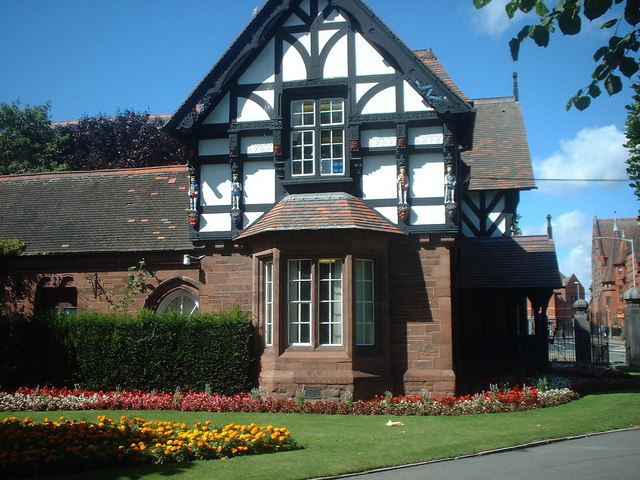
Grosvenor Park Lodge

Another major influence in his work was the rise of interest in vernacular architecture. By the time Douglas moved to Chester, the black-and-white revival using half-timbering was well under way, and Douglas came to incorporate this style in his buildings in Chester and elsewhere. The black-and-white revival did not start in Chester, but it did become Chester's speciality. The first Chester architect involved in the revival had been Thomas Mainwaring Penson, whose first work in this genre was the restoration of a shop in Eastgate Street in the early 1850s. Other early Chester architects involved in the revival were T. A. Richardson and James Harrison and it came to be developed mainly by T. M. Lockwood and by Douglas. Part of Douglas's earliest work for the Grosvenor family, the entrance lodge to Grosvenor Park, used half-timbering in its upper storey; this is the first known use by Douglas of black-and-white. Other vernacular motifs were taken from earlier styles of English architecture, in particular, the Tudor style. These include tile-hanging, pargetting and massive brick ribbed chimney stacks. In this style, Douglas was influenced by the architects Nesfield and Shaw. Douglas also used vernacular elements from the continent, especially the late medieval brickwork of Germany and the Low Countries.

A characteristic of Douglas's work is his attention to both external and internal detailing. Such detailing was not derived from any particular style and Douglas chose elements from whichever style suited his purpose for each specific project. His detailing applied particularly to his joinery, perhaps inspired by his experience in his father's workshop, and was applied both to wooden fittings and to the furniture he designed. A further Continental influence was his use of a Dutch gable. The most important and consistently used element in Douglas's vernacular buildings was his use of half-timbering, which was usually used for parts of the building. However, in the cases of Rowden Abbey and St Michael and All Angels Church, Altcar, the entire buildings were timber-framed.

== Significant works ==
=== Early works (1860–70) ===
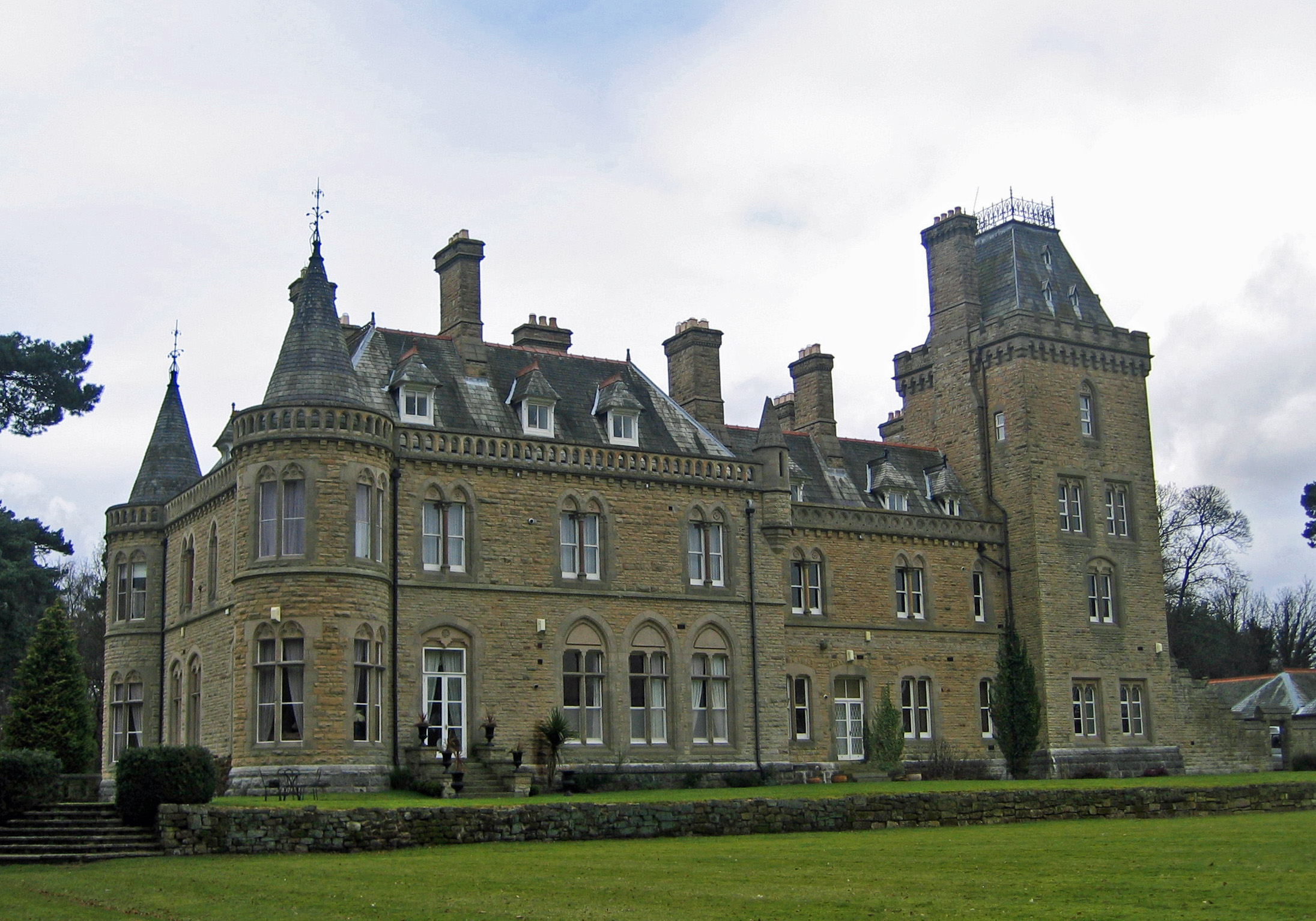
Oakmere Hall

Douglas's earliest significant commissions were for the 2nd Baron Delamere and were very different in type and style from each another. The addition of a wing to Vale Royal Abbey (1860) was in Elizabethan style while St John's Church at Over (1860–63) was of the Gothic Revival in Early Decorated style. The Congregational Chapel, also at Over (1865) was again different, being built in polychromic brick in High Victorian style. Meanwhile, Douglas had designed a shop at 19–21 Sankey Street, Warrington (1864) with Gothic arcades and detailed stone carving which Hubbard considers to be his "first building of real and outstanding quality...in its way one of the best things he ever did". Shortly after this came the first commissions for the Grosvenor family, consisting of a lodge and other structures in Grosvenor Park, Chester (1865–67), and St John the Baptist's Church, Aldford (1865–66). His first commission for a large house was Oakmere Hall (1867) for John & Thomas Johnson, industrialists of Runcorn. It is in High Victorian style and includes a main block and a service wing, a large tower on the south face, a small tower with turrets, a porte-cochère, steep roofs and dormer windows. Another early church was St Ann's at Warrington (1868–69), again High Victorian in style, which is described as being "quite startlingly bold" and "a prodigy church in Douglas's output". By 1869–70 Douglas had started to design buildings on the Eaton Hall estate; in his study Das englische Haus, the German architect and writer Hermann Muthesius included an illustration of the Eaton "Cheese-dairy". Around this time Douglas also re-modelled St Mary's Church, Dodleston.

=== Early mature buildings (1870–84) ===
==== Secular ====
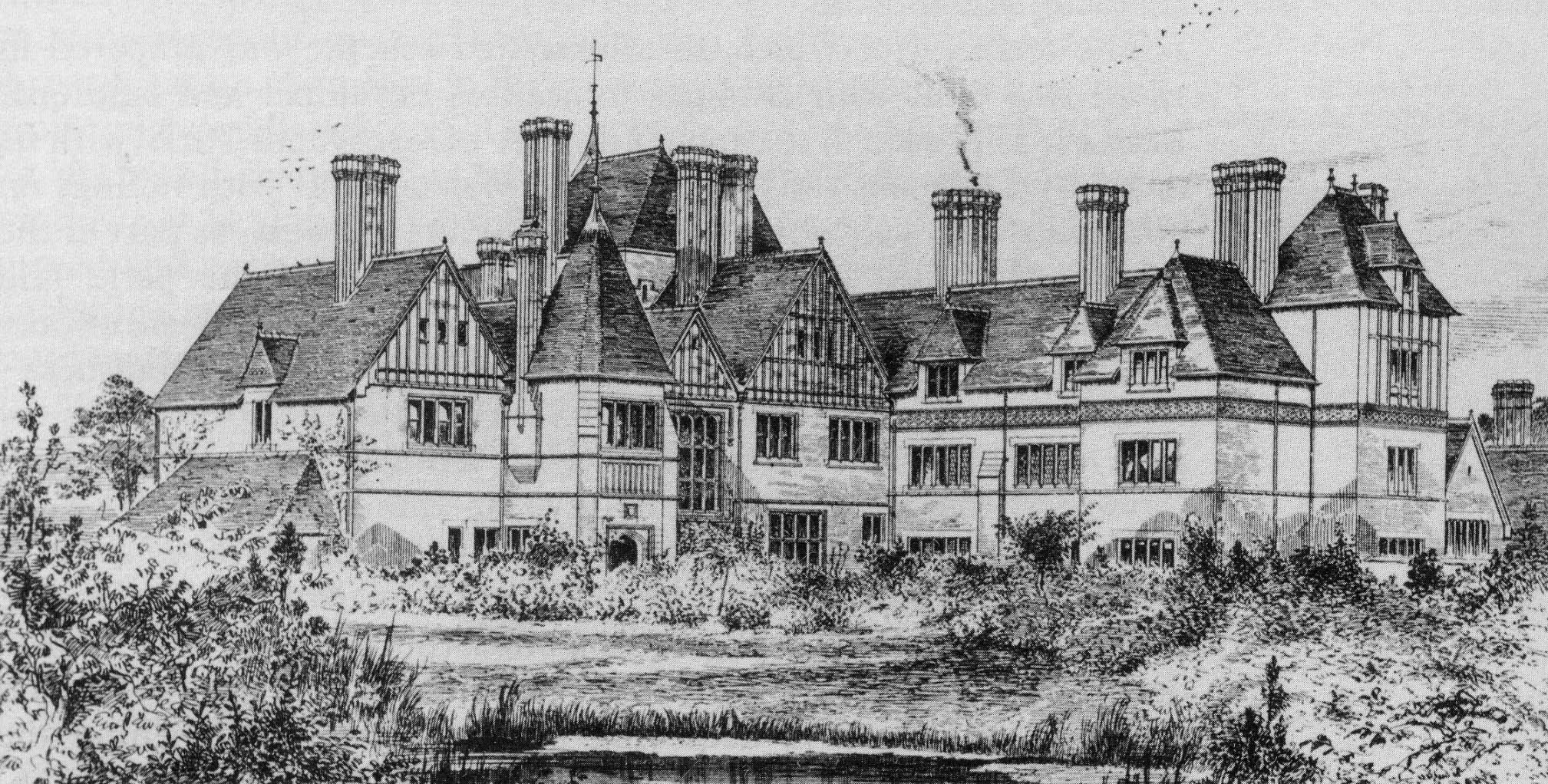
Shotwick Park around 1879; image taken from The Builder

Many of the secular buildings in this period were smaller-scale structures. These include cottages in Great Budworth, and cottages, houses, schools and farms in the Eaton Hall estate and its associated villages. In 1872 he designed Shotwick Park, a large house in Great Saughall, built in brick with some half-timbering; it has steep roofs, tall ribbed chimneys and turrets. About the same time he reconstructed Broxton Higher Hall, incorporating much half-timbering. Commissions for more large houses came in the late 1870s and 1880s. The Gelli (1877) is a house in three ranges designed for the Kenyon sisters in the village of Tallarn Green, Flintshire. Also built for the Kenyon family is Llannerch Panna in Penley, Flintshire (1878–79), which is "competent in its handling of timberwork". An entirely black-and-white house with jettying is Rowden Abbey (1881) in Herefordshire. Back in North Wales, Plas Mynach (1883) in Barmouth includes much detailed woodwork internally.

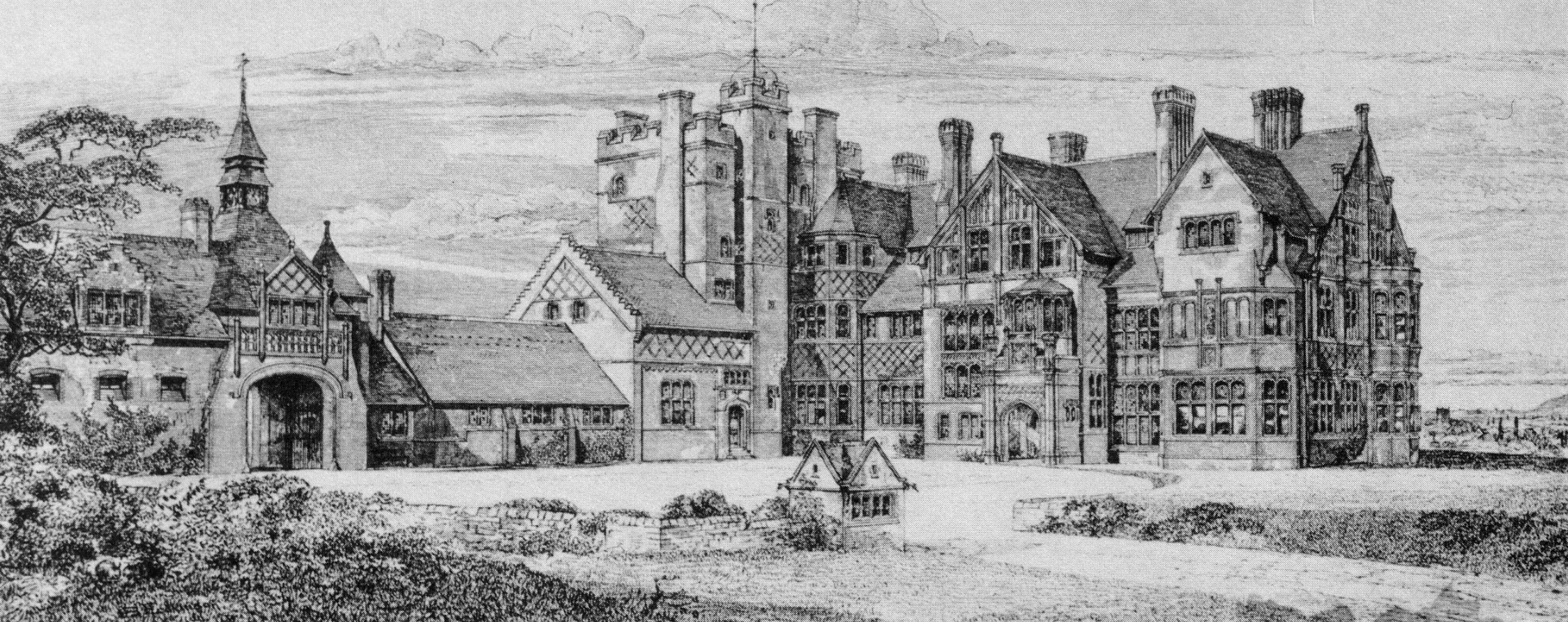
Borrowmore Hall about 1881; also from The Builder

In about 1879–81 Douglas built a terrace of houses on his own land in Chester, 6–11 Grosvenor Park Road, the road leading to the main entrance to Grosvenor Park, in High Victorian style. About 1883 he designed Barrowmore Hall (or Barrow Court) at Great Barrow (since demolished) which was one of his largest houses. Also around this time he designed buildings on the Eaton Hall estate, including Eccleston Hill (1881–82), a large house for the Duke's secretary, the Stud Lodge, a smaller building of the same dates, Eccleston Hill Lodge (1881), a three-storey gatehouse at the main entrance to the park, with a high hipped roof and turrets, and The Paddocks (1882–83), another large house, this time for the Duke's land agent. In Chester city centre his designs included the Grosvenor Club and North and South Wales Bank (1881–83) in Eastgate Street, built in stone and brick, with a turret and a stepped gable, and 142 Foregate Street for the Cheshire County Constabulary (1884), with a shaped gable in Flemish style.

==== Churches ====
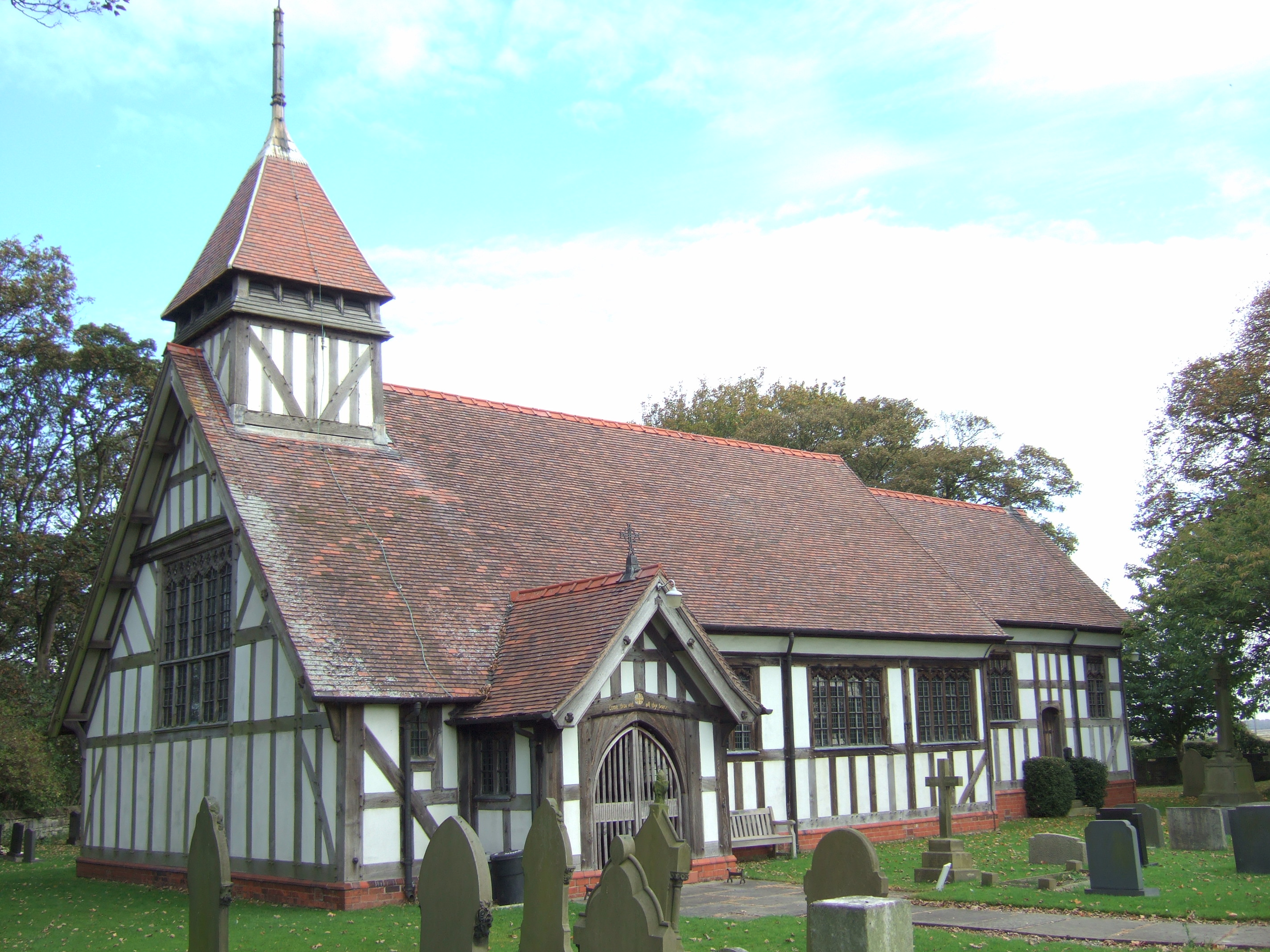
St Michael and All Angels Church, Altcar

St Mary's Church, Whitegate was restored in 1874–75 for the 2nd Baron Delamere, retaining much of the medieval interior but rebuilding the exterior, adding a short chancel, and incorporating half-timbering. St Paul's Church, Boughton in Chester was Douglas's own parish church which he rebuilt in 1876 incorporating parts of the pre-existing building. Douglas's only church built entirely in half-timbering is the small church of St Michael and All Angels at Great Altcar in Lancashire. A church built in brick with half-timbering is St Chad's (1881) at Hopwas in Staffordshire. During this period Douglas built or restored a series of churches entirely in stone, incorporating mainly Gothic features together with vernacular elements. These include St John the Baptist's Church, Hartford (1873–75), St Paul's, Marston (1874, now demolished), the Presbyterian Chapel (1875) at Rossett, Denbighshire, St Stephen's, Moulton (1876), the rebuilding of Christ Church, Chester (also in 1876), the Church of St Mary the Virgin (1877–78) at Halkyn, Flintshire, and the Welsh Church of St John the Evangelist (1878) in Mold, also in Flintshire. Later in this period he built St Mary's Church, at Pulford in 1881–84 for the Duke of Westminster and in 1882–85 St Werburgh's New Church at Warburton for Rowland Egerton-Warburton.

=== Partnerships ===
==== Douglas & Fordham (1884–98) ====
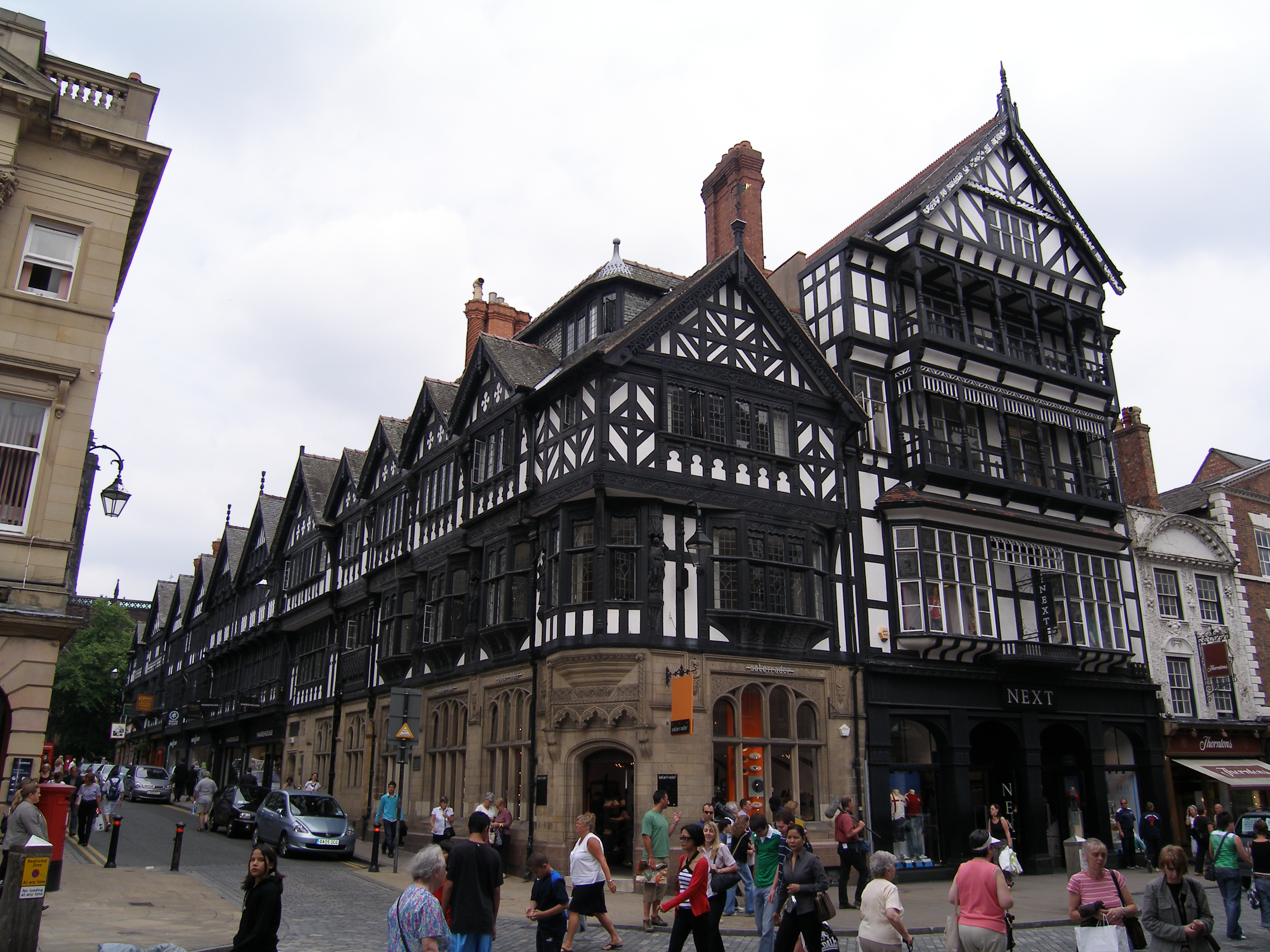
St Werburgh Street, Chester, showing the range of Douglas's buildings

In 1885–87 the partnership designed Abbeystead House for the 4th Earl of Sefton in North Lancashire. Hubbard describes this as "the finest of Douglas's Elizabethan houses, and one of the largest which he ever designed". During this time additions were made to Jodrell Hall in Cheshire and Halkyn Castle in Flintshire. In 1885 the Castle Hotel at Conwy, Caernarfonshire, was remodelled, and in 1887–88 a strongroom was added to Hawarden Castle, followed by a porch in 1890. During this period more buildings were added to the Eaton Hall estate, and these included houses and cottages, such as Eccleston Hill, and Eccleston Ferry House, and farms such as Saighton Lane Farm. In 1890–91 an obelisk was built in the Belgrave Avenue approach to Eaton Hall. The last house designed by Douglas on a large scale was Brocksford Hall (1893) in Derbyshire. This was a country house in Elizabethan style using diapered brick and stone dressings with a clock tower. In Chester city centre, 38 Bridge Street (1897) is a timber-framed shop that incorporates a section of Chester Rows and contains heavily decorated carving. From 1892 the partnership designed houses and cottages in Port Sunlight for Lever Brothers. Also in the village they designed the Dell Bridge (1894), and the school (1894–96), which is now called the Lyceum. In 1896 Douglas designed a house for himself, Walmoor Hill in Dee Banks, Chester, in Elizabethan style. Between 1895 and 1897 he designed a range of buildings on the east side of St Werburgh Street in the centre of Chester. At its south end, on the corner of Eastgate Street, is a bank whose ground storey is built in stone, and behind this leading up St Werburgh Street, the ground storey consists of shop fronts. Above this the range consists of two storeys plus an attic, which are covered in highly ornamented timber-framing. On the first floor is a series of oriel windows, the second floor is jettied, and at the top are eleven gables. Pevsner considers that this range of buildings is "Douglas at his best (though also at his showiest)". Hubbard expresses the opinion that "in this work, the city's half-timber revival reached its very apogee".

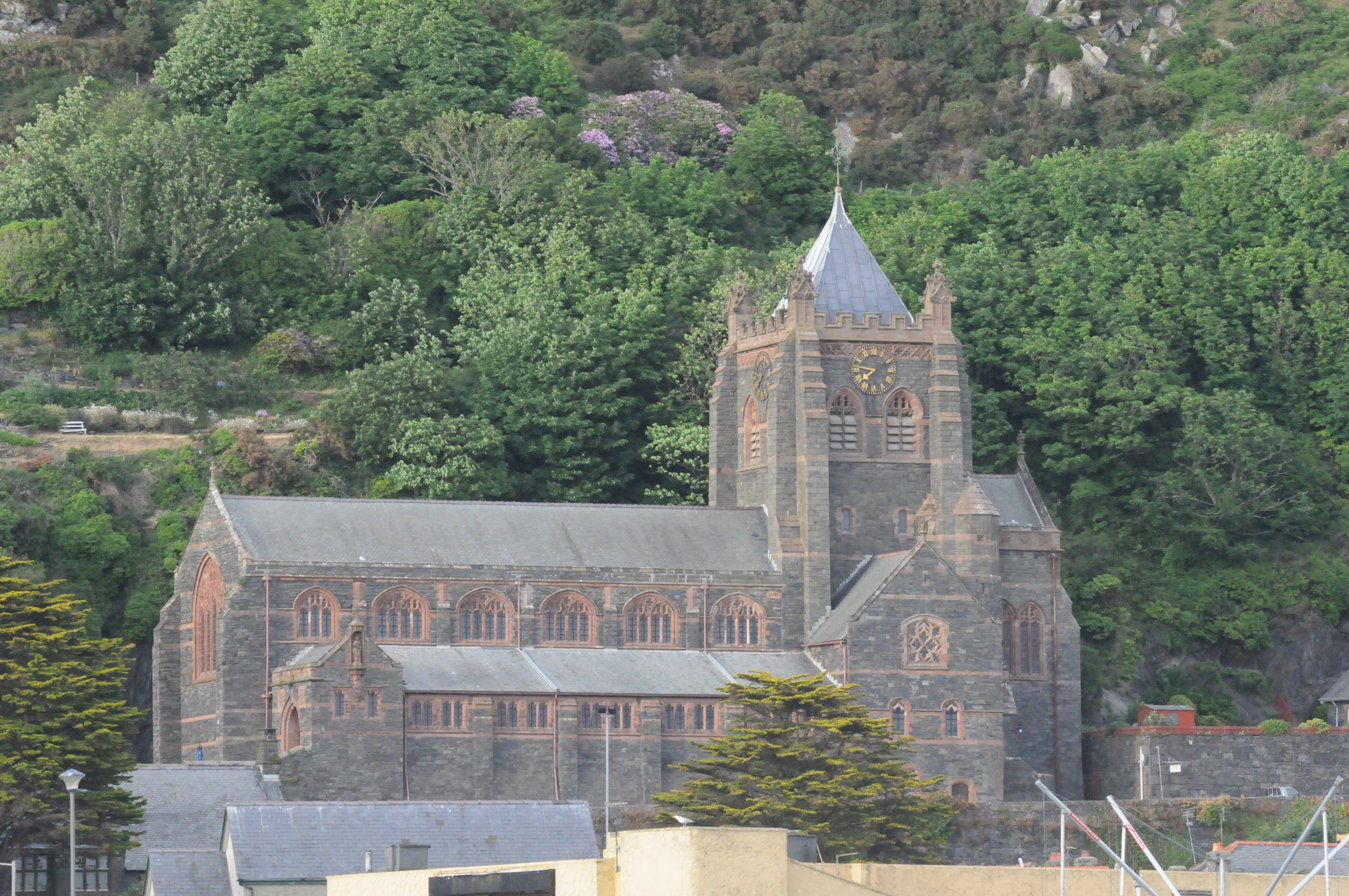
St John's Church Barmouth

During the partnership, work continued on designing new churches and restoring older ones. In 1884–85 a chapel was built at Carlett Park at Eastham in the Wirral and in 1884–87 St Deiniol's Church was built in Criccieth, Caernarfonshire. Christ Church, Rossett (1886–92), St Paul's Church, Colwyn Bay (1887–88 with later additions), and St Andrew's Church, West Kirby (1889–91) followed. St John's Church in Barmouth, Merionethshire was built between 1889 and 1895. It is one of the largest of Douglas's churches, although in 1891, during its construction, the tower collapsed and had to be rebuilt. Other churches built in North Wales were Christ Church in Bryn-y-Maen, Colwyn Bay, and All Saints, Deganwy (both 1897–99).

In about 1891–92 the Church of St James the Great, Haydock, was built. This was constructed in half-timber to give protection against possible mining subsidence. Other new churches built during this partnership were St Wenefrede's Church, Bickley (1892), St David's Welsh Church in Rhosllannerchrugog, Denbighshire, All Saints Church, Higher Kinnerton (1893), the Congregational Church in Great Crosby (1897–98), and St John the Evangelist's Church, Weston, Runcorn (1897–1900). A spire was added to St Peter's Church, Chester in 1886–87 and a tower was added to Holy Trinity Church, Capenhurst in about 1889–90. In 1886–87 Douglas added a bell tower to St John the Baptist's Church, Chester and this was followed by the rebuilding of its north aisle. Other restorations, embellishments, and additions of monuments and furniture were carried out in churches during this partnership.

==== Douglas & Minshull (1898–1909) and Douglas alone (1909–11) ====
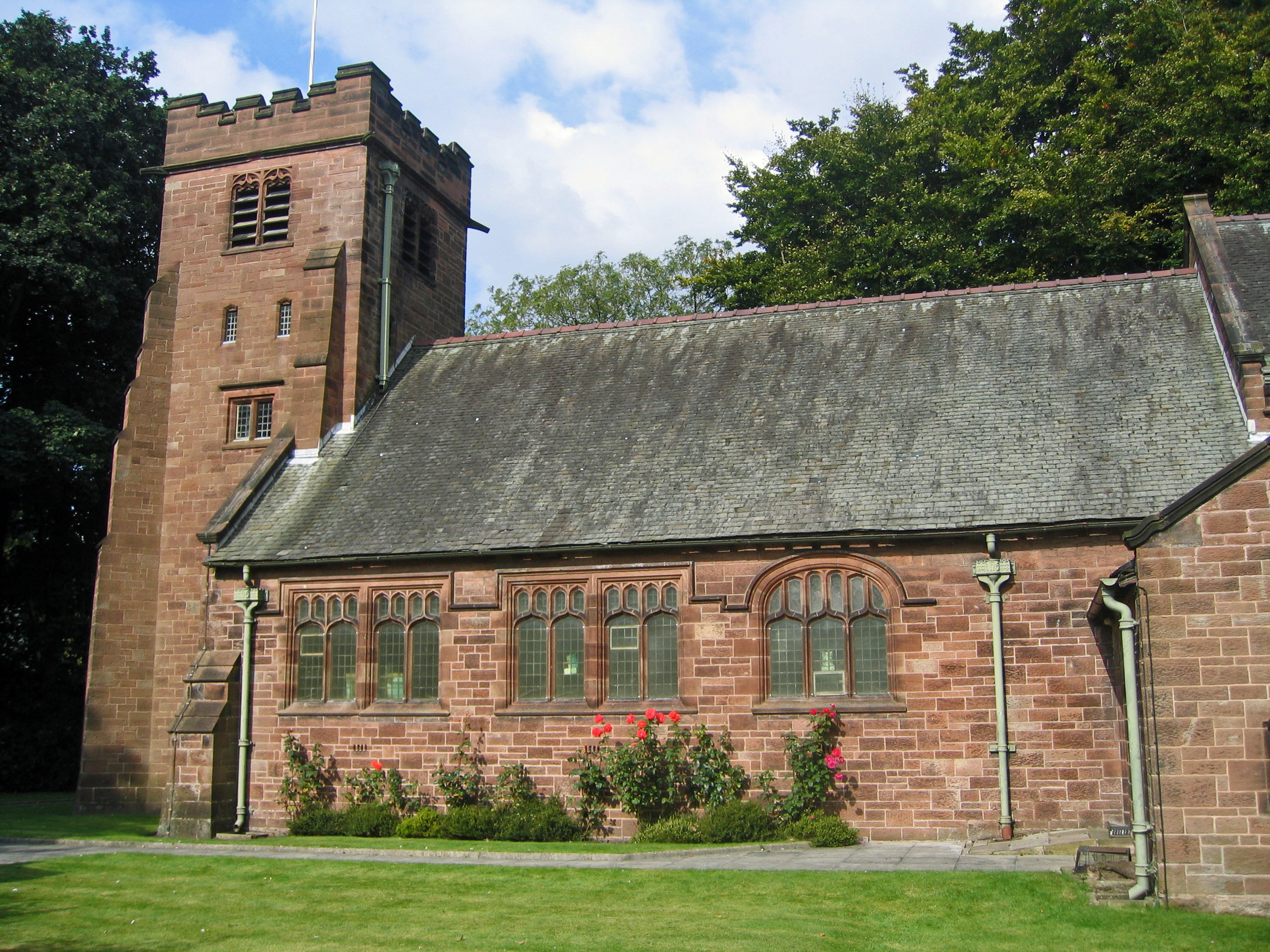
St John the Evangelist's Church, Sandiway

In 1898 the firm designed St Oswald's Chambers in St Werburgh Street, Chester, and this was followed by further buildings in the city. In 1902–03 Douglas built St John the Evangelist's Church, in the village of his birth, Sandiway. It was built on land owned by Douglas and he paid for the cost of the chancel and the lych gate. In 1899 the Diamond Jubilee Memorial Clock, constructed in open wrought iron, was erected on the Eastgate in Chester to commemorate Queen Victoria's Diamond Jubilee in 1897. In 1898–1901 Chester's public baths were built; this was an unusual work for Douglas as it involved specialist engineering work. During this period one of Douglas's most important secular buildings was designed, St Deiniol's Library, at Hawarden, Flintshire, for W. E. Gladstone and his family. The first phase was constructed between 1899 and 1902, and the library was completed in 1904–06. Around this time the practice was commissioned to work on two churches in association with Gladstone; St Ethelwold's (1898–1902) was a new church at Shotton in Flintshire, and additions were made to St Matthew's at Buckley, also in Flintshire, between 1897 and 1905. The other new churches built during this period were Douglas's only Scottish church, the Episcopal Church (1903) in Lockerbie, Dumfriesshire, and St Matthew's Church (1910–11) in Saltney, Flintshire. Alterations were made and furniture was designed for other churches. Douglas's last major project was the addition of a tower to his church of St Paul's at Colwyn Bay, but he died before this could be completed.

=== Publication ===
Douglas published no writings of his own and left no records of his ideas and thoughts. The only publication with which he was associated was the Abbey Square Sketch Book, which he edited. The book appeared in three volumes, the first dated 1872 and the others undated; it consisted of sketches and drawings (with some photographs in the third volume) by many contributors. The pictures depicted buildings and furniture, mainly dating from the late medieval period and the 16th and 17th centuries, and mostly from Cheshire and northwest England. Douglas's only contribution was a jointly ascribed plate in the third volume. It is likely that he designed the title pages, or at least the drawing incorporated in it, of the Abbey Gateway in Chester.

== Reputation, influences and legacy ==
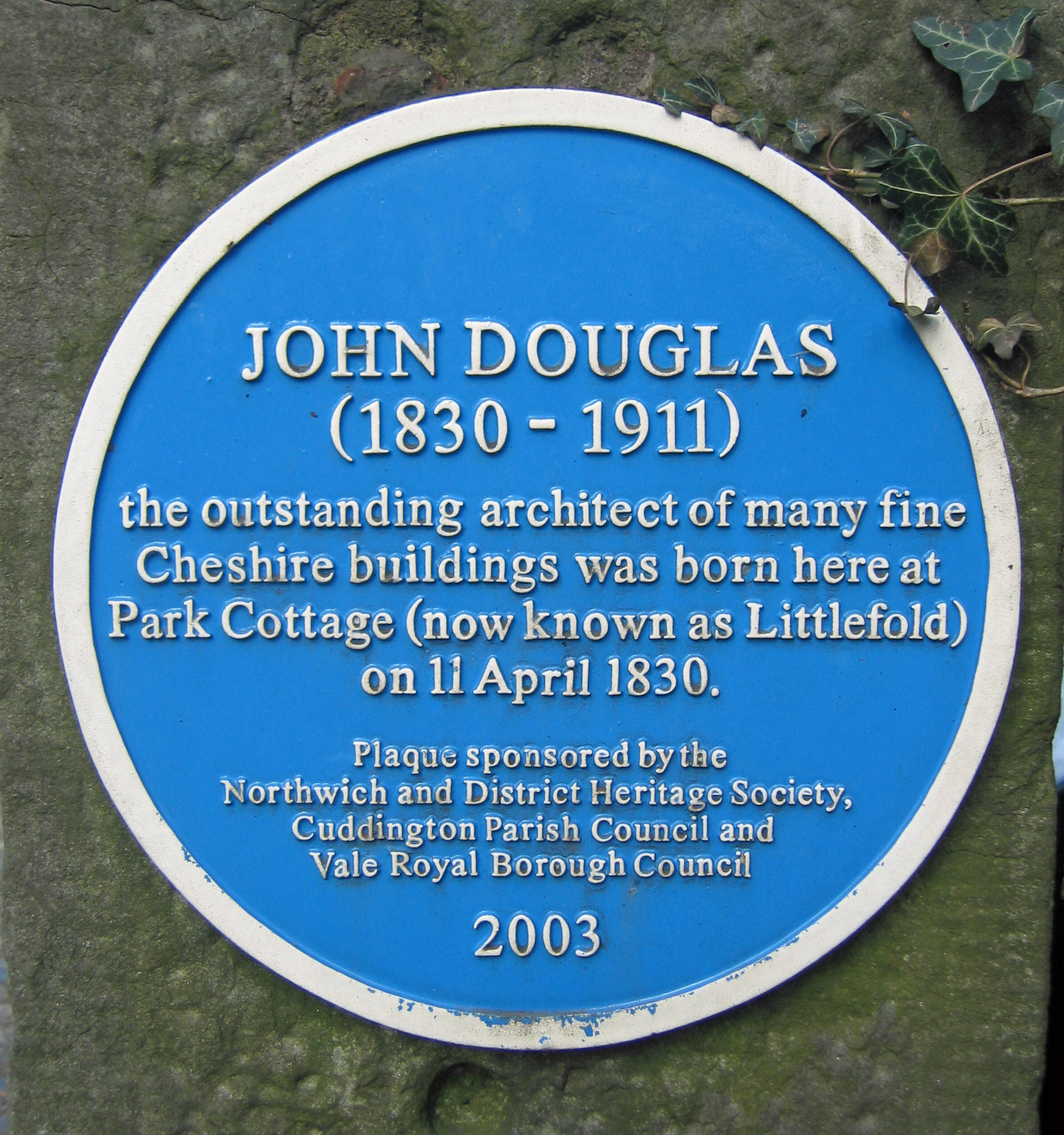
Commemoration plaque on the gatepost of his birthplace

Douglas practised for the whole of his career in a provincial county town, and most of his works were concentrated in Cheshire and North Wales, yet he "conducted a practice which achieved national renown". He was never a member of the Royal Institute of British Architects, but his works featured frequently in national publications, including Building News, The Builder, The Architect, and The British Architect, the last of which particularly praised many of his works. A number of Douglas's works were exhibited at the Royal Academy and appeared in Academy Architecture. Douglas's obituary in The British Architect referred to him as having "achieved a reputation which has long placed him in the front rank of living architects". In the series The Buildings of England, Nikolaus Pevsner described him, without reservation, as "the best Cheshire architect". In the companion series The Buildings of Wales: Clwyd, Hubbard expressed the opinion that he was "the most important and active local architect of the period". Critical praise was not confined to Britain; Douglas's works were acclaimed by the French architect Paul Sédille, and Muthesius wrote of his "consummate mastery of form". Despite this, the only official recognition he received in his lifetime was a medal for Abbeystead House, which was shown at an exhibition in Paris.

Many of the architects training and working in Douglas's office were influenced by him. Perhaps the best known of these were Edmund Kirby and Edward Ould. Kirby is best remembered for his Roman Catholic churches. Ould went on to design a number of buildings in Chester and further afield in a Douglas-like style, including notably Wightwick Manor and various buildings at Port Sunlight. Other architects who did not work in his office were also influenced by him; these include Thomas Lockwood, Richard Thomas Beckett, Howard Hignett, A. E. Powers, James Strong and the Cheshire County Architect, Henry Beswick.

A large proportion of Douglas's buildings still exist, many of them being listed buildings, in a wide variety of types and styles. Douglas is not remembered for any one building type; his churches and houses are considered to be of equal importance. He was not a pioneer of any particular new development, but instead followed national stylistic trends while still retaining his individuality. His buildings are "anything but copyist" and they "bear a highly individual and nearly always recognisable stamp". The major characteristics of his buildings are "sure proportions, imaginative massing and grouping ... immaculate detailing and a superb sense of craftsmanship and feeling for materials". His work is "architecture which can be enjoyed as well as admired".

== See also ==
- List of works by John Douglas
- List of new churches by John Douglas
- List of church restorations, amendments and furniture by John Douglas
- List of houses and associated buildings by John Douglas
- List of non-ecclesiastical and non-residential works by John Douglas
