= Hen Llys =

- Interactive map of Hen Llys
- 52.6185°N 3.3024°W
- Location: Manafon, Powys, Wales

History
- Built: 1898
- Built for: Mrs Perrins-Williams

Site notes
- Architect: John Douglas
- Architectural style: Vernacular

Listed Building – Grade II
- Designated: 4 February 1997
- Reference no.: 18224

Hen Llys (or Henllys Hall) is a house in Manafon Community, Powys, Wales, about 4 km south of Llanfair Caereinion and overlooking the River Rhiw. "Hen Lys" (sic) is Welsh for "Old Court". It is a Grade II listed building. In his biography of John Douglas, Edward Hubbard attributes its design to this Chester architect. In its listing, Cadw makes a firm attribution to Douglas as architect.

The house was built in 1898 for Mrs Perrins-Williams. It is constructed of squared rubble with red sandstone dressings, and it has a slate roof. It has two storeys and a cellar; the original house had four bays, and an extension was added in the 20th century. The upper storey of the outer bay on the west is slightly jettied and rests on corbels; its roof has a stepped gable. The east bay projects forward, is canted, and has a crenellated parapet. The central bays are gabled. All the window have stone frames with mullions and transoms. The entrance porch is in ashlar sandstone and over it is an inscription that includes the date of construction of the house, over which is a coat of arms.

== See also ==
- List of houses and associated buildings by John Douglas
