= Tudor Court, Penley =

Tudor Court
- Llannerch Panna (Welsh)
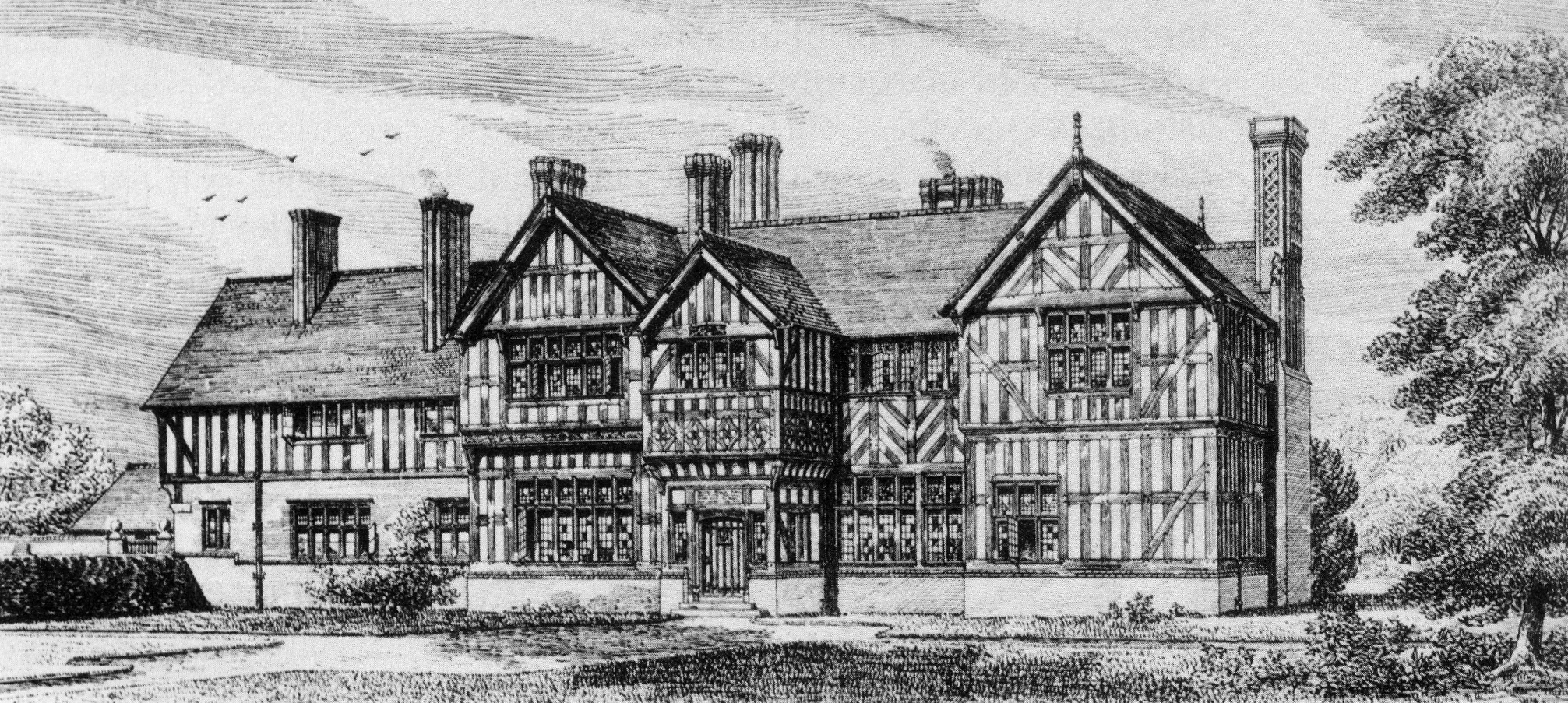
- Interactive map of Tudor Court
- 52.9478°N 2.8778°W
- Location: Penley, Wrexham, Wales

History
- Built: 1878–79
- Built for: Hon. George T. Kenyon

Site notes
- Architect: John Douglas

Tudor Court is a house 0.5 miles (1 km) south of the village of Penley, Wrexham, Wales. It was originally called Llannerch Panna.

== History ==
The house was built in 1878–79 for Hon. George T. Kenyon, the younger son of the 3rd Baron Kenyon. It was designed by the Chester architect John Douglas. A kitchen wing was added in the 20th century.

== Architecture ==
It is entirely half-timbered on a plinth of Ruabon red brick. The bricks for the chimneys and the roof tiles are also from Ruabon. The house is in two storeys and consists of a hall with cross wings, and a two-storeyed porch in the angle of one of the wings. Internally there is a gallery encircling the hall.

== See also ==
- List of houses and associated buildings by John Douglas
