= List of houses and associated buildings by John Douglas =

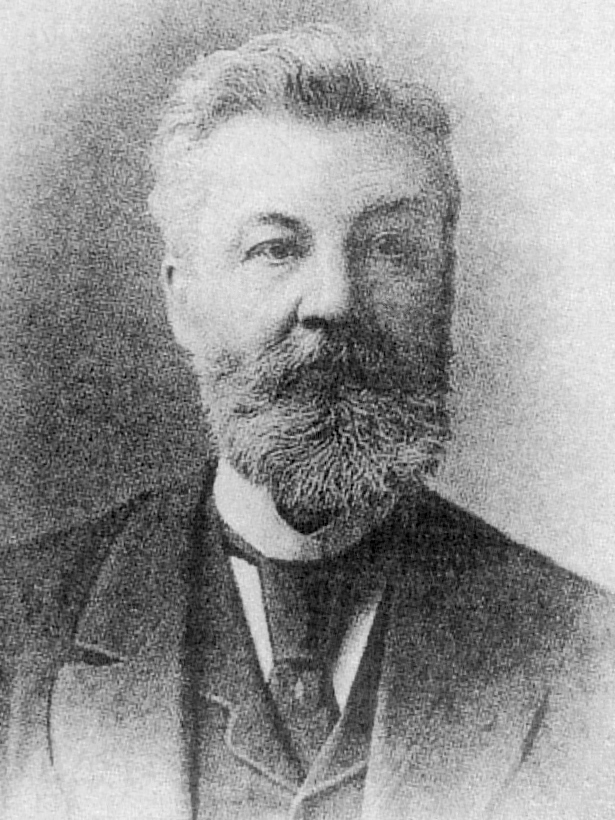
John Douglas in late middle age

John Douglas (1830–1911) was an English architect based in Chester, Cheshire. His designs included new churches, alterations to and restoration of existing churches, church furnishings, new houses and alterations to existing houses, and a variety of other buildings, including shops, banks, offices, schools, memorials and public buildings. His architectural styles were eclectic, but as he worked during the period of the Gothic Revival, much of his work incorporates elements of the English Gothic style. Douglas is probably best remembered for his incorporation of vernacular elements in his buildings, especially half-timbering. Of particular importance is Douglas' use of joinery and highly detailed wood carving.

Douglas was born in the Cheshire village of Sandiway and was articled to the Lancaster architect E. G. Paley, later becoming his chief assistant. He established an office in Chester in either 1855 or 1860, from where he practised throughout his career. Initially he ran the office himself but in 1884 he appointed his assistant, Daniel Porter Fordham, as a partner. When Fordham retired in 1897, he was succeeded by Charles Howard Minshull. In 1909 this partnership was dissolved and Douglas ran the office alone until his death in 1911. As his office was in Chester, most of his work on houses was in Cheshire and North Wales, although some was further afield, in Lancashire, Merseyside, Greater Manchester, Warwickshire, Herefordshire, Worcestershire, Derbyshire, Surrey, and Scotland.

From an early stage in his career, Douglas attracted commissions from wealthy and powerful patrons, the first of which came from Hugh Cholmondeley, 2nd Baron Delamere. His most important patrons were the Grosvenor family of Eaton Hall, namely Richard Grosvenor, 2nd Marquess of Westminster; Hugh Grosvenor, 1st Duke of Westminster; and Hugh Grosvenor, 2nd Duke of Westminster. Douglas designed a large number and variety of buildings in the family's Eaton Hall estate and the surrounding villages. Other important patrons were William Molyneux, 4th Earl of Sefton; Rowland Egerton-Warburton of Arley Hall; George Cholmondeley, 5th Marquess of Cholmondeley; and Francis Egerton, 3rd Earl of Ellesmere. Later in his career Douglas carried out commissions for W. E. Gladstone and his family, and for W. H. Lever.

Douglas' new houses embrace a range of sizes and types, and include substantial country houses, such as Oakmere Hall and Abbeystead House; cottages, such as the pair known as Tai Cochion; workers' houses, such as those in Port Sunlight; and terraces of houses built for speculation, including 6–11 Grosvenor Park Road and 1–11 and 13 Bath Street in Chester. Work carried out on grand houses included additions to Vale Royal Abbey and Hawarden Castle. Works associated with houses include entrance gates for Mostyn Hall and a set of kennels at Croxteth Hall. Many of Douglas' new houses have been designated as listed buildings. Listed buildings are divided into three grades according to their importance. This list consists of work carried out by Douglas in designing new houses, additions and modifications to pre-existing houses, and structures related to houses such as kennels and gates. The details have been taken mainly from the Catalogue of Works in the biography by Edward Hubbard. Not all structures in these categories are included. If a building is listed, it has been included. Some unlisted buildings have been included because they are of interest, or they demonstrate that Douglas worked in areas at a distance away from his office in Chester. The works excluded are, on the whole, small houses, cottages and outbuildings. Works attributed to Douglas by Hubbard on stylistic grounds together with evidence of a local association, even though they are not confirmed by other reliable evidence, are included. Where this is the case, it is stated in the Notes column. Unexecuted schemes are not included.

== Key ==
Grade (England and Wales)	Criteria
Grade I	Buildings of exceptional interest, sometimes considered to be internationally important.
Grade II*	Particularly important buildings of more than special interest.
Grade II	Buildings of national importance and special interest.
Category (Scotland)	Criteria
Category B	Buildings of special architectural or historic interest which are major examples of a particular period, style or building type.
"—" denotes a work that is not graded.

== Houses and associated buildings ==
Name	Location	Date	Notes	Grade
Vale Royal Abbey	Whitegate, Cheshire; 53.2247°N 2.5426°W	1. 1860; 2. 1861; 3. 1877	Alterations were made to the house for the 2nd Baron Delamere: in 1860 the centre of the south range, which had previously been timber-framed, was encased in brick; the following year Douglas added the southwest wing; and in 1877 the library was remodelled.	II*
Kennels at Croxteth Hall	Croxteth, Liverpool, Merseyside; 53.4397°N 2.8762°W	c. 1861–70	Douglas designed kennels in the grounds of Croxteth Hall in High Victorian style for William Molyneux, 4th Earl of Sefton.	II
Grosvenor Park Lodge	Grosvenor Park, Chester, Cheshire; 53.1909°N 2.8819°W	1865–67	Built for the 2nd Marquess of Westminster, this is Douglas' first recorded commission for the Grosvenor family. It is also his first known use of black-and-white timber framing.	II
Burford Lane Farmhouse	Oughtrington, Cheshire; 53.3767°N 2.4453°W	1866	The farmhouse was built for George C. Dewhurst; the lower two storeys are in brick and the attics are timber-framed.	II
Oakmere Hall	Sandiway, Cheshire; 53.2296°N 2.6148°W	1867	This was Douglas' largest commission to date; the house was built for John and Thomas Johnson of Runcorn, in Gothic style with a tower, a porte cochère, circular turrets, steep roofs, and hipped and gabled dormers.	II
Dene Cottages	Great Budworth, Cheshire; 53.2931°N 2.5096°W	1867–68	This pair of cottages was built for Rowland Egerton-Warburton of Arley Hall. The cottages have a brick lower storey and a timber-framed upper storey; the plasterwork is pargetted.	II
Soughton Hall	Sychdyn, Flintshire; 53.1979°N 3.1268°W	1867–69	Reconstruction for John Scott Bankes; the 18th-century house, which had been remodelled in the 1820s by Charles Barry, was encased in brick, the façade was reconstructed, a porch added to the south front and, in 1872, a game larder was built.	II*
31 and 33 Dee Banks	Chester, Cheshire; 53.1858°N 2.8687°W	1869	Douglas built the houses for himself and lived in No. 33; No. 31 was probably planned as an investment. Their style is Gothic Revival—they are built in brick with polychromic diapering.	II
Church Cottage	Eccleston, Cheshire; 53.1574°N 2.8788°W	1870	The cottage was built in brick with timber-framed and tile-hung gables for the 1st Duke of Westminster.	II
54–57 High Street	Great Budworth, Cheshire; 53.2935°N 2.5060°W	c. 1870	This row of four cottages was refaced and partly re-built for Rowland Egerton-Warburton.	II
Polesworth Vicarage	Polesworth, Warwickshire; 52.6187°N 1.6127°W	c. 1870	The vicarage incorporated earlier parts of a building on the site of an abbess' lodging. It has an irregular E-plan, and is built in brick and timber framing.	II
Goldmine House	26 Southbank, Great Budworth, Cheshire; 53.2931°N 2.5044°W	c. 1870	This is a substantial house of irregular plan in brown brick with some timber framing built for Rowland Egerton-Warburton.	II
Plas Tan-y-Bwlch	Maentwrog, Gwynedd, Wales; 52.9462°N 4.0024°W	1872	Additions were made to the house for W. E. Oakley.	II*
The Limes Farmhouse	Pulford, Cheshire; 53.1320°N 2.9310°W	1872	This house is in three bays with two storeys and large dormers; there is much brick detailing and a pargetted gable. It was built for the 1st Duke of Westminster and is now known as Green Paddocks.	II
Shotwick House	Great Saughall, Cheshire; 53.2256°N 2.9631°W	1. 1872; 2. 1907	Originally named Shotwick Park, this is a large brick house with turrets and steeply hipped roofs built for H. D. Trelawny. After a fire in 1907 it was enlarged and rebuilt for Thorneycroft Vernon.	II
Broxton Higher Hall	Broxton, Cheshire; 53.0743°N 2.7671°W	c. 1873	Douglas carried out a reconstruction of an earlier building, with much use of half-timbering, for Sir Philip de M. Grey Egerton.	II
Ruloe House	Near Norley, Cheshire; 53.2512°N 2.6263°W	c. 1873	The house was built for the Wilbraham estate. It is in red brick with red tiled roofs, and has a circular turret with a conical roof.	II
Hill Bark Farmhouse	Frankby, Merseyside; 53.3645°N 3.1307°W	1875	The farmhouse was part of a model farm for Septimus Ledward; it was built in stone with a half-timbered upper storey. Outbuildings for the farm were also designed by Douglas.	II
Cilcain Hall	Cilcain, Flintshire, Wales; 53.2055°N 3.2203°W	1875–77	The hall was built in stone with a red-tiled roof for the railway engineer W. B. Buddicom.	—
The Gelli	Tallarn Green, Wrexham, Wales; 52.9889°N 2.7998°W	1877	This house was built in three ranges at right angles to each other in brick with some stone and half-timbering for Hons. Georgina and Henrietta Kenyon. It includes a tower with a pyramidal roof and a turret incorporating a dovecote.	II*
Tai Cochion	Nannerch, Flintshire, Wales; 52.2162°N 2.2501°W	1877–78	This was a pair of cottages built on the village street for the railway engineer W. B. Buddicom.	II
Aldford Lodge	Aldford, Cheshire; 53.1289°N 2.8661°W	1877–;79	Aldford Lodge was originally a pair of cottages built in brick with pargetted gable heads for the 1st Duke of Westminster.	II
Upper Belgrave Lodge	Eaton Hall, Cheshire; 53.1415°N 2.8893°W	1877–79	The lodge was built for the 1st Duke of Westminster. It is T-shaped with the lower storey in brick with sandstone blocks, and the upper jettied and timber-framed.	II
Eaton Boat	Eaton, Cheshire; 53.1531°N 2.8785°W	c. 1877	Formerly called Gas Works Cottages, these were built in stone with half-timbered gables for the 1st Duke of Westminster. The roof is patterned with red and blue tiles.	II
Whitegate vicarage	Whitegate, Cheshire; 53.2186°N 2.5581°W	1878	This was built in brick with a partly jettied upper storey for the 2nd Baron Delamere as the vicarage for St Mary's Church.	—
Llanerch Panna	Penley, Wrexham, Wales; 52.9478°N 2.8778°W	1878–79	Llanerch Panna was a house for Hon. George T. Kenyon. It is entirely half-timbered on a Ruabon brick plinth, with brick chimneys and a red-tiled roof. The house is now named Tudor Court.	—
Model Cottage	Sandiway, Cheshire; 53.2318°N 2.5905°W	c. 1879	This was built by Douglas on his own land, in brick with a Welsh slate roof.	II
6–11 Grosvenor Park Road	Chester, Cheshire; 53.1914°N 2.8817°W	c. 1879–80	This terrace of six houses was built by Douglas on his own land on the approach to Grosvenor Park. They are in red brick with terracotta dressings and are flanked by turrets.	II*
St Oswald's Vicarage	Parkgate Road, Chester, Cheshire; 53.1980°N 2.8958°W	1880	The vicarage was built in brick with Westmorland green slate roofs with an attached parish room. It now houses the English Department of the University of Chester.	II
Bent Farmhouse	Warburton, Greater Manchester; 53.3985°N 2.4465°W	1880	This is a timber-framed building which was heavily restored by Douglas for Rowland Egerton-Warburton.	II
Police House	Eaton Road, Eccleston, Cheshire; 53.1567°N 2.8807°W	c. 1880	This house was built for the 1st Duke of Westminster and is attributed to Douglas.	II
Eccleston Hill Lodge	Eaton Hall, Cheshire; 53.1537°N 2.8852°W	1881	The lodge was built for the 1st Duke of Westminster. It consists of a three-storey gatehouse with turrets and a hipped roof which is so high that it is virtually a spire.	II*
Rowden Abbey	Bromyard, Herefordshire; 52.2038°N 2.5411°W	1881	Rowden Abbey is an entirely black-and-white house with heavy ornamentation which was built for H. J. Bailey.	—
West Lodge	Abberley, Worcestershire; 52.3034°N 2.3830°W	1881	This building for John Joseph Jones of Abberley Hall is attributed to Douglas.	II
Aldford Hall Farmhouse	Aldford, Cheshire; 53.1172°N 2.8710°W	1881–82	The lower storey of the house, built for the 1st Duke of Westminster, is in stone, the upper in brick, and it has a Dutch gable.	II
Eccleston Hill	Eccleston, Cheshire; 53.1547°N 2.8845°W	1. 1881–82; 2. 1892–94	The original building consisted of a house, stables and a cottage constructed as a residence for the secretary of the 1st Duke of Westminster. Alterations and additions were made to it in the 1890s.	II
Barrowmore Hall (Barrow Court)	Great Barrow, Cheshire	c. 1881	This was one of Douglas' largest country houses, built for the grain merchant Hugh Lyle Smyth. It has been demolished.	—
The Paddocks	Eccleston, Cheshire; 53.1553°N 2.8811°W	1882–83	The Paddocks (or Eccleston Paddocks) was built for Cecil Parker, the land agent of the 1st Duke of Westminster; its service wing was demolished in 1960. The house has a sandstone lower storey with brick above, two circular turrets, steep hipped roofs and a massive chimney.	II*
Wigfair Hall	Cefn Meiriadog, Denbighshire, Wales; 53.2292°N 3.4578°W	1882–84	This was the re-building of an earlier house on the site for Rev. R. H. Howard. It is in Jacobethan style, built in red brick with stone dressings; it has an L-plan with a pyramid-roofed tower.	II*
Plas Mynach	Barmouth, Gwynedd, Wales; 52.7292°N 4.0627°W	1883	Plas Mynach stands in a prominent isolated position and has much internal, detailed woodwork; it was built for W. H. Jones.	II*
Cornist Hall	Flint, Flintshire, Wales; 53.2415°N 3.1638°W	1884	Work on rebuilding the hall was commissioned by Richard Muspratt but ceased on his death and was not completed. It is now used as a venue for weddings and for dining.	—
Jodrell Hall	Twemlow, Cheshire; 53.2276°N 2.3072°W	1885	The hall was built in Georgian style in 1779. Douglas added a south wing and a porch. It is now used as Terra Nova School.	II
Abbeystead House	Abbeystead, Lancashire; 53.9848°N 2.6615°W	1. 1885–87; 2. 1891–92; 3. 1894	Abbeystead House was built in Elizabethan style with two lodges for William Molyneux, 4th Earl of Sefton. In the 1890s stables, a pair of cottages, and gun and billiard rooms were added.	II
Halkyn Castle	Halkyn, Flintshire, Wales; 53.2293°N 3.1857°W	1886	An additional wing was added in Elizabethan style, and internal alterations including a staircase and a chimneypiece were made for the 1st Duke of Westminster.	II*
Danefield House	Largs, North Ayrshire, Scotland	c. 1886	This is the only recorded house designed by Douglas in Scotland; it was built for W. G. Crum.	B
Coetmor	Ruthin, Denbighshire, Wales; 53.1164°N 3.3053°W	c. 1886	Coetmor was a house for Col. Cornwallis West. It forms a pair with Dedwyddfa.	II
Dedwyddfa	Ruthin, Denbighshire, Wales; 53.1164°N 3.3053°W	c. 1886	This house has been attributed to Douglas. It forms a pair with Coetmor.	II
Eccleston Ferry House	Eccleston, Cheshire; 53.1533°N 2.8745°W	1887–88	The house is near an ancient crossing place of the River Dee. It has an L-shaped plan, and was built in red brick with some timber framing for the 1st Duke of Westminster.	II
Hawarden Castle	Hawarden, Flintshire, Wales; 53.1834°N 3.0180°W	1. 1887–88; 2. 1889	Additions were made to the house for W. E. Gladstone. An octagonal strongroom for storing papers was built, followed by a porch to celebrate the Gladstones' golden wedding.	II
Parker's Buildings	115 Foregate Street, Chester, Cheshire; 53.1924°N 2.8841°W	1888–89	This was a block of 30 flats built for the 1st Duke of Westminster and named after his nephew and land agent, Cecil Parker. The flats were to provide accommodation for retired workers from the Duke's estate at Eaton Hall.	II
Gloddaeth Hall	Llandudno, Conwy, Wales; 53.3095°N 3.7990°W	1889	Douglas added a west wing to the hall for Lady Augusta Mostyn. It is now part of St David's College.	I
Belgrave Lodge	Eaton Hall, Cheshire; 53.1437°N 2.9183°W	1889–90	The lodge was built in red brick with stone dressings for the 1st Duke of Westminster. The chimneys have barley-sugar brickwork.	II
Green Farmhouse	Poulton, Cheshire; 53.1245°N 2.9043°W	1889–90	Extensions were made to the rear of this house, which dates from the 18th century, for the 1st Duke of Westminster.	II
Abbotsford	Cuddington, Cheshire; 53.2432°N 2.5978°W	1890	Abbotsford was a house built in red brick with Lakeland slate roofs for Jabez S. Thompson.	II
Glangwna	Caernarfon, Wales; 53.1346°N 4.2411°W	1892–93	This was the largest of Douglas' houses in which half-timbering was used on an extensive scale; it is entirely black-and-white above the ground storey. The house was built for J. E. Greaves.	—
Houses and cottages	Port Sunlight, Merseyside; 53.355°N 2.997°W	1892–99	Douglas was one of the architects who designed a number of domestic buildings in a variety of styles in the model village of Port Sunlight for the Lever Brothers.	II
Brocksford Hall	Doveridge, Derbyshire; 52.8986°N 1.8073°W	1893	Brocksford Hall was a major country house in Jacobethan style designed for C. W. Jervis Smith. It was the last house designed by Douglas on such a great scale. It was later used as an independent school and has now been converted into apartments.	II
Llety'r Dryw	Abergele Road, Colwyn Bay, Conwy, Wales; 53.2899°N 3.7106°W	1893	This consists of a new house built for John Eden, and the re-modelling of earlier building to form stables. The house is a simple stone-built villa with gabled cross wings. It is now owned by the North Wales Police Authority.	II
Wardley Hall	Worsley, Greater Manchester; 53.5158°N 2.3669°W	1894	Douglas carried out an extensive restoration of a house dating from about 1500 for Francis Egerton, 3rd Earl of Ellesmere.	I
Home Place	Oxted, Surrey	1894	Home Place was a medium-sized house.	—
Iron Bridge Lodge	Aldford, Cheshire; 53.1347°N 2.8717°W	1894–95	The lodge was built for the 1st Duke of Westminster. Its lower storey is of brick on a sandstone plinth and the upper storey is jettied and half-timbered.	II
Two lodges	Worsley, Greater Manchester; 53.5038°N 2.3864°W	1. 1894–96; 2. 1896	Douglas designed two lodges for Worsley Old Hall for the 3rd Earl of Ellesmere, one in Walkden Road and the other off Greenleach Lane.	—
West Lodge	Leigh Road, Worsley, Greater Manchester; 53.5031°N 2.3950°W	1894–96	West Lodge was a two-storey timber-framed house for Worsley New Hall designed for the 3rd Earl of Ellesmere.	—
Saighton Grange	Saighton, Cheshire; 53.1505°N 2.8341°W	1894–96	Alterations and additions were made to the house and stables were added for the 1st Duke of Westminster. It is now used by Abbey Gate College.	II
Walmoor Hill	Dee Banks, Chester, Cheshire; 53.1872°N 2.8687°W	1896	Walmoor Hill is a sandstone house that Douglas built for himself. It has a T-shaped plan and is in Elizabethan style. Since Douglas' death it has been used as a girls' school and as the County Fire Headquarters.	II*
Entrance Gates	Mostyn Hall, Mostyn, Flintshire, Wales; 53.315828°N 3.278984°W	1896	The gates have stone piers, and the ironwork, executed by James Swindley, is in early 18th-century Baroque style.	II
Thornton Manor	Thornton Hough, Merseyside; 53.3276°N 3.0519°W	c. 1896	The pre-existing house was extended for W. H. Lever with a block in Elizabethan style. Most of this was demolished and replaced in 1913; two gables and bay windows remain.	II
Hen Llys	Manafon, Powys, Wales; 52.6185°N 3.3024°W	1898	This house was built for Mrs Perris-Williams. It is a stone house with a slate roof in two storeys plus a cellar. An extension was added in the 20th century.	II
Colshaw Hall	Peover Superior, Cheshire; 53.2658°N 2.3278°W	1903	This is a house in red brick with stone dressings and a slate roof. It has two storeys plus an attic.	II
1–11 and 13 Bath Street	Chester, Cheshire; 53.1915°N 2.8828°W	1903	This is a row of attached cottages and one separate house which were built on Douglas' own land. They are built in sandstone and have an irregular frontage; this includes gables jettied on corbels, dormers, bay windows, and three round turrets.	II
The Homestead	Weaverham Road, Sandiway, Cheshire; 53.2355°N 2.5931°W	1906–07	Douglas sold the land to B. J. Sanby and the large house built on the site is attributed to him. Its name was changed to Redwalls and was used as a children's home. In 2010 it is being used as a nursing home.	II

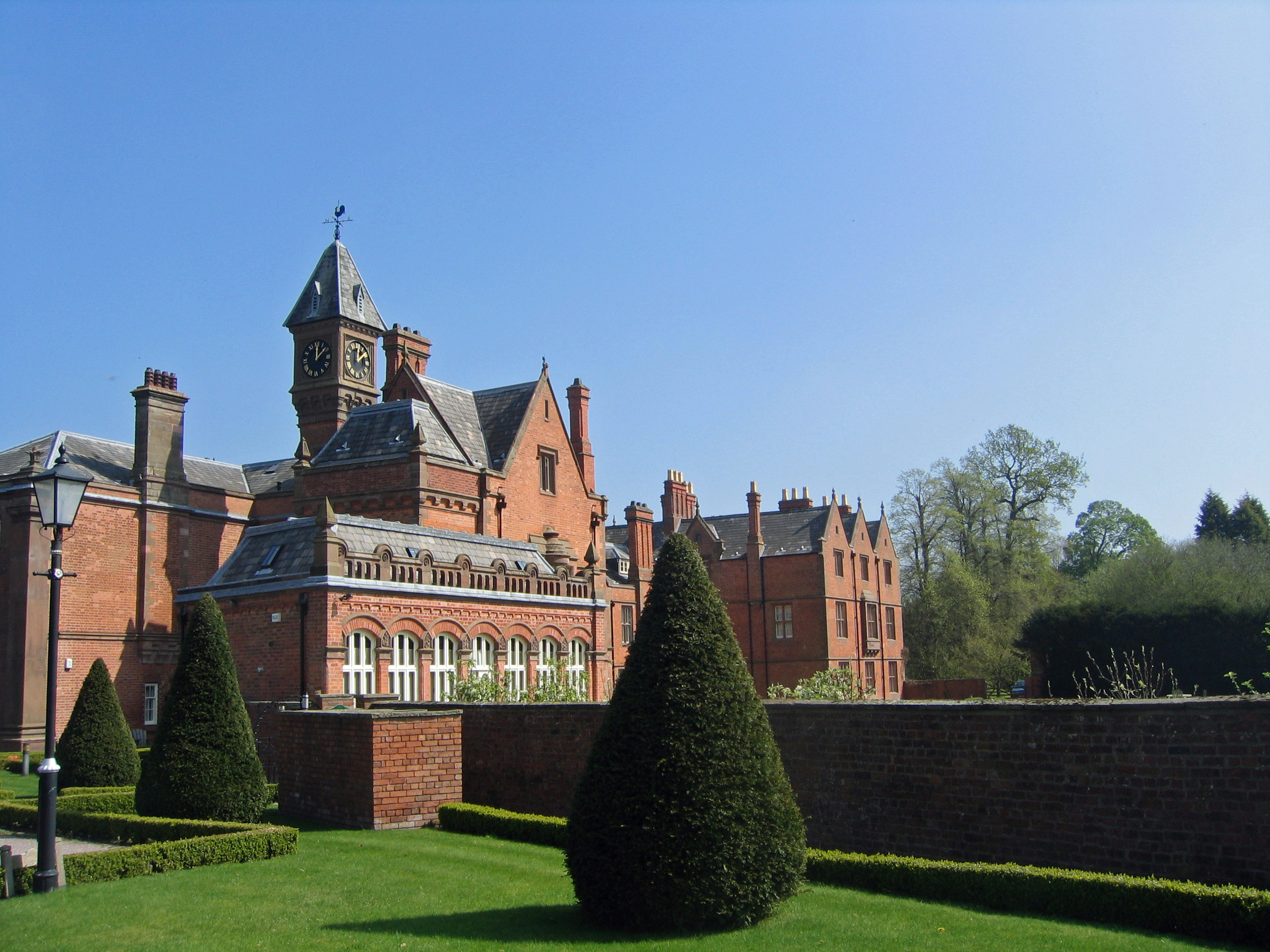
Vale Royal Abbey showing the southwest wing added in 1861

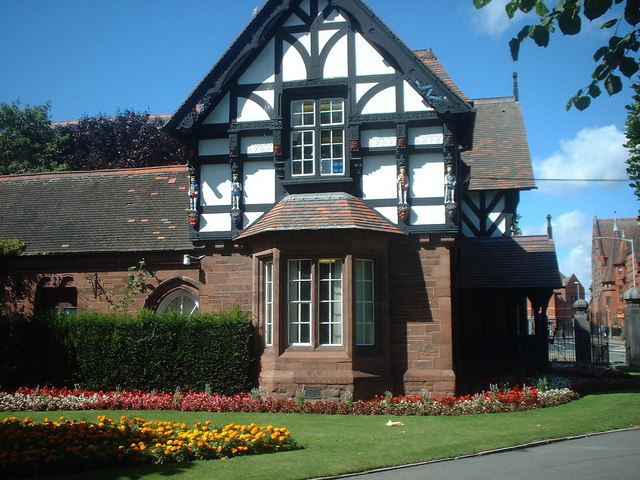
Grosvenor Park Lodge, south face

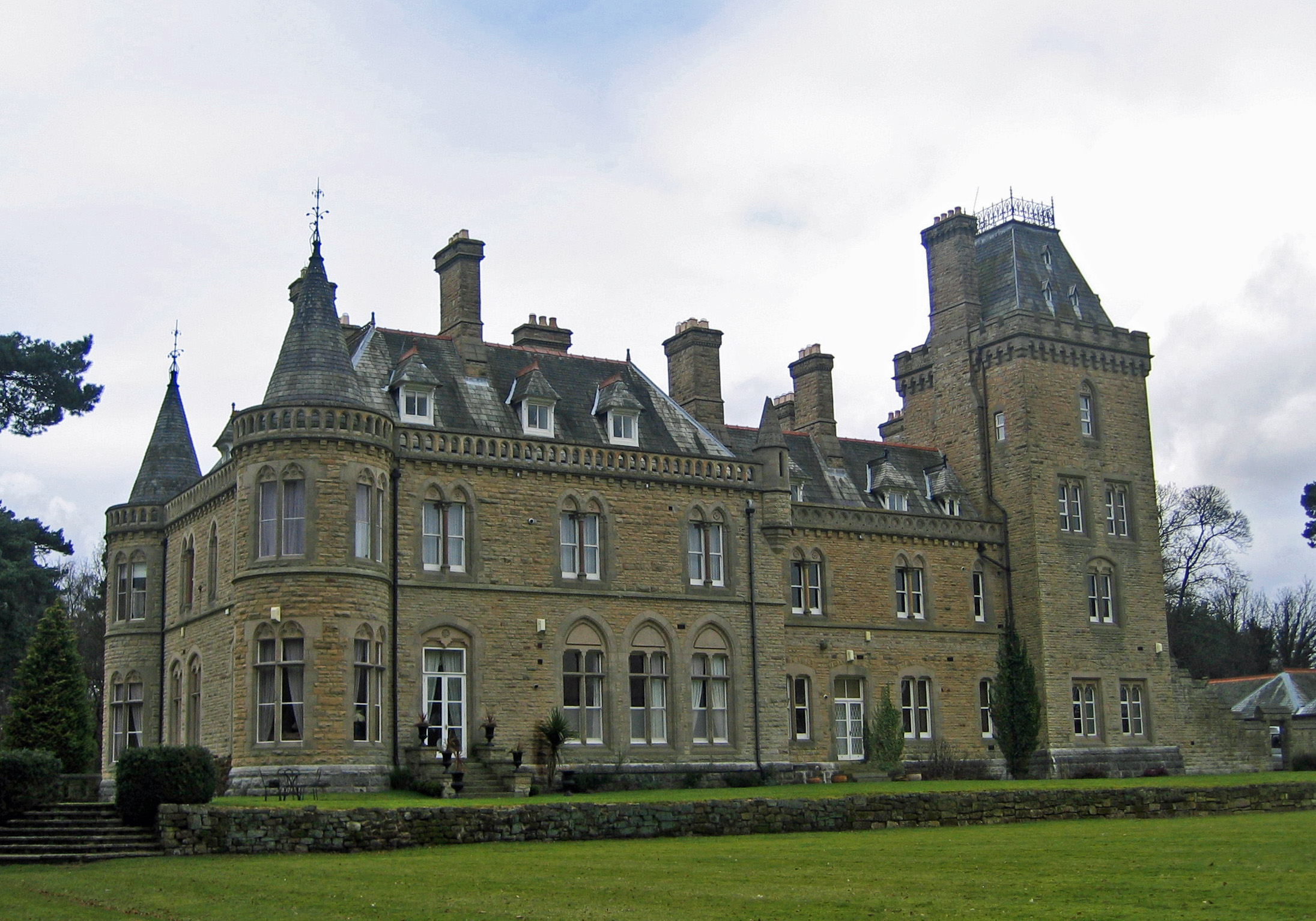
Oakmere Hall south (garden) front

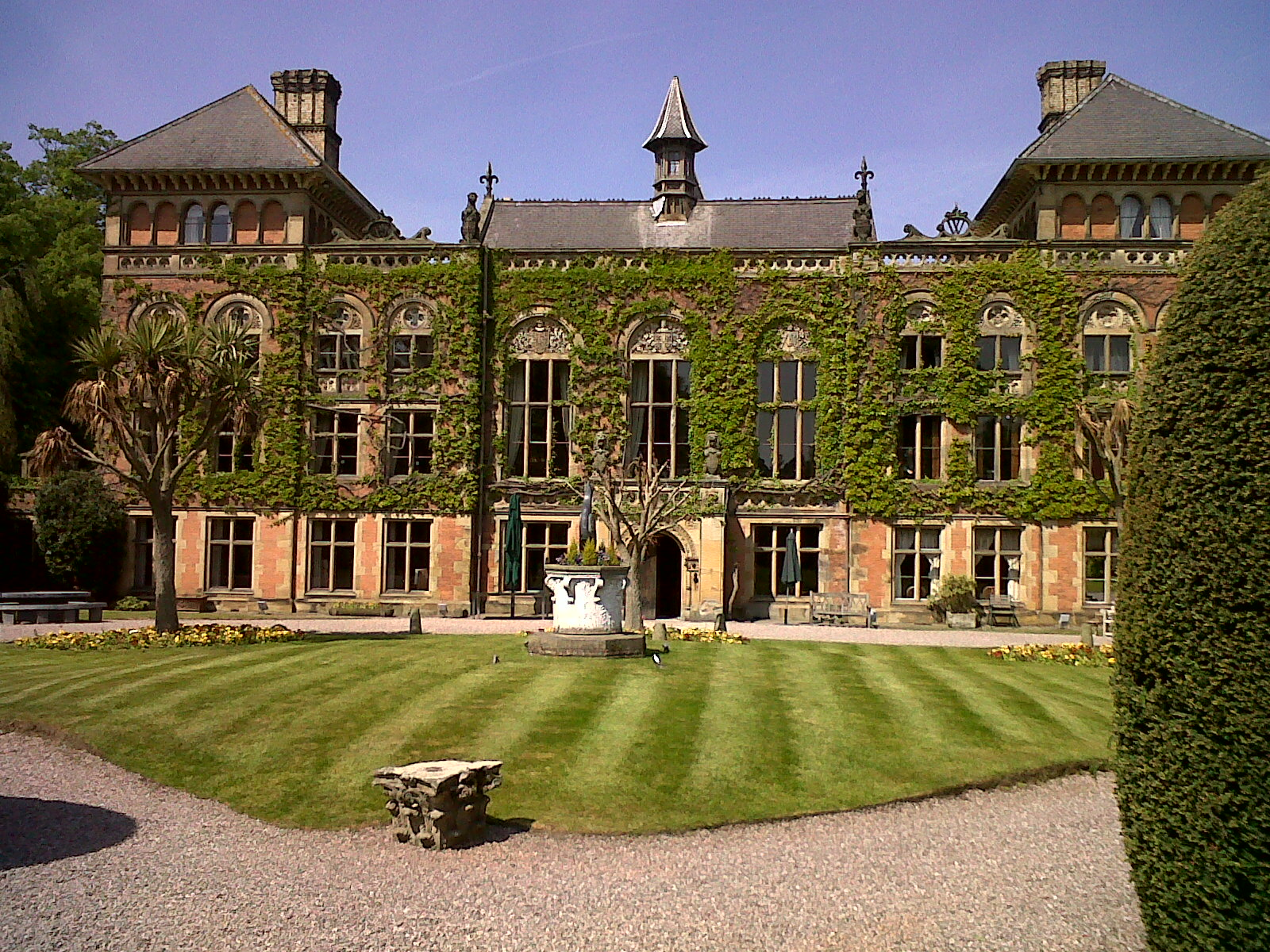
Soughton Hall

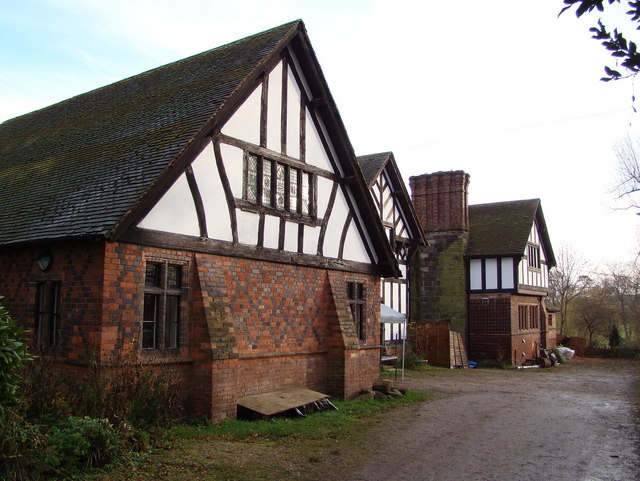
Polesworth Vicarage

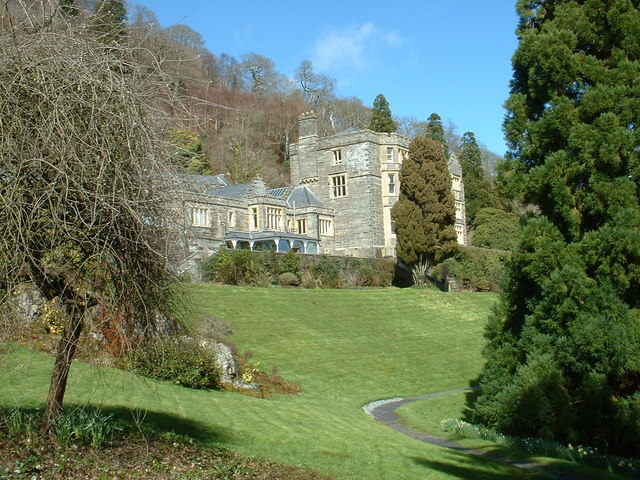
Plas Tan-y-Bwlch

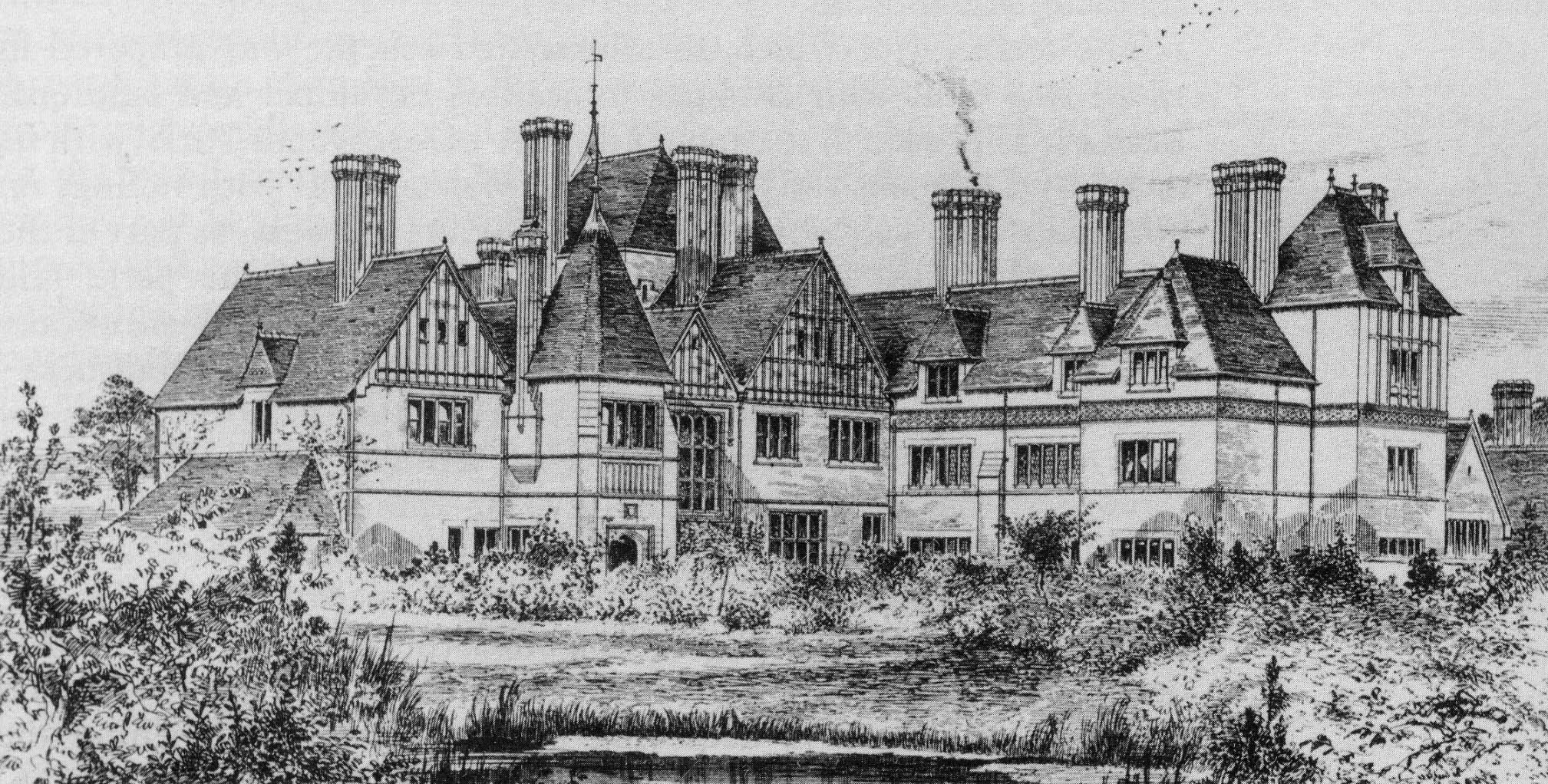
Shotwick Park in 1897

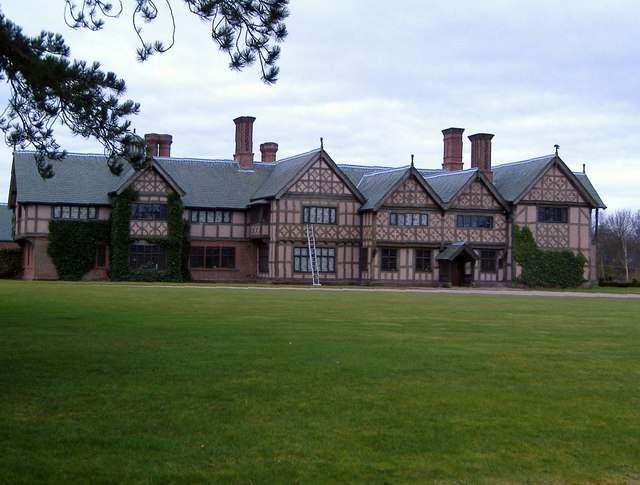
Broxton Higher Hall

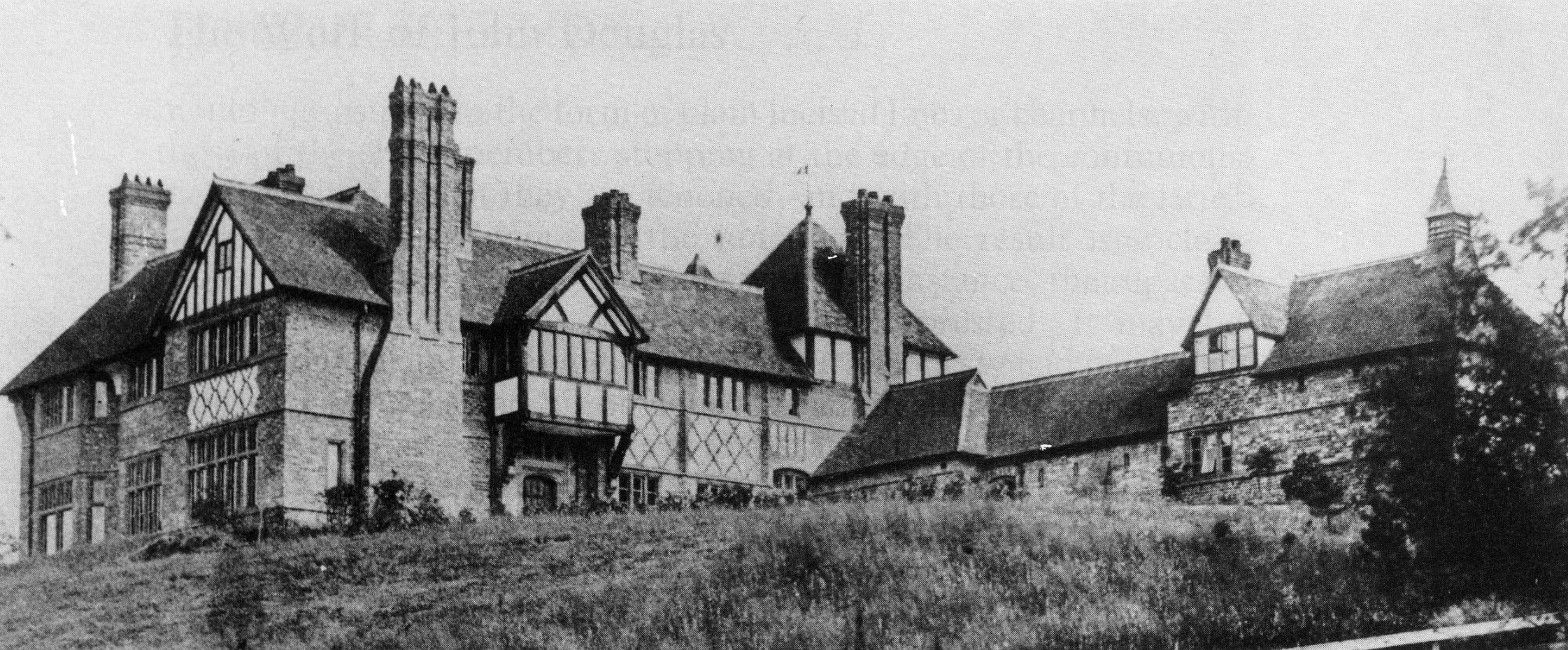
The Gelli c. 1880

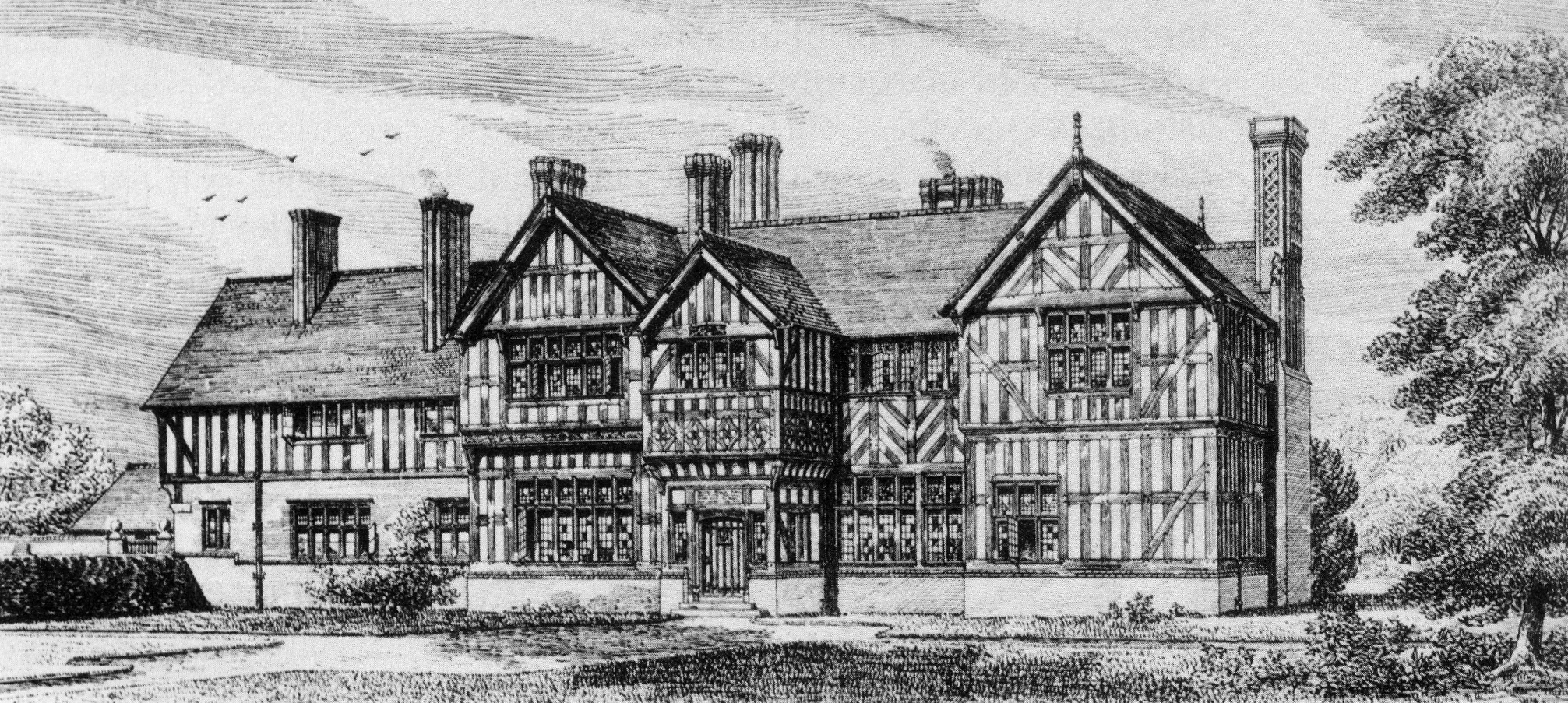
Llannerch Panna in 1879

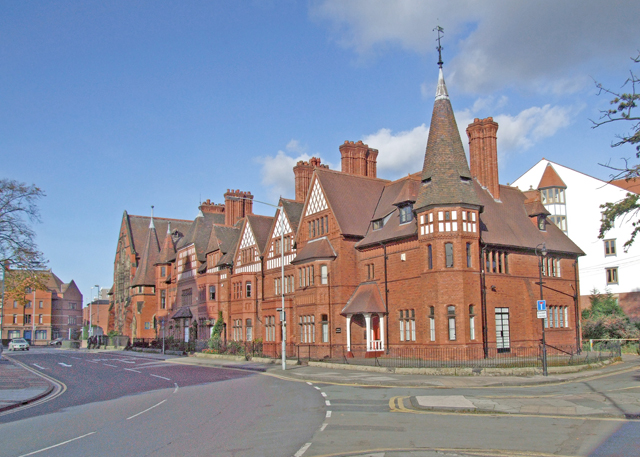
Grosvenor Park Road, Chester

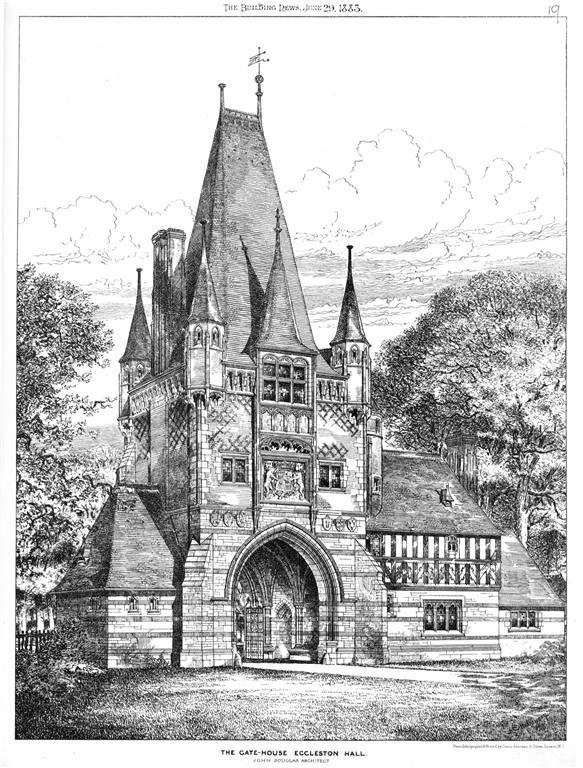
Drawing of Eccleston Hill Lodge in 1883

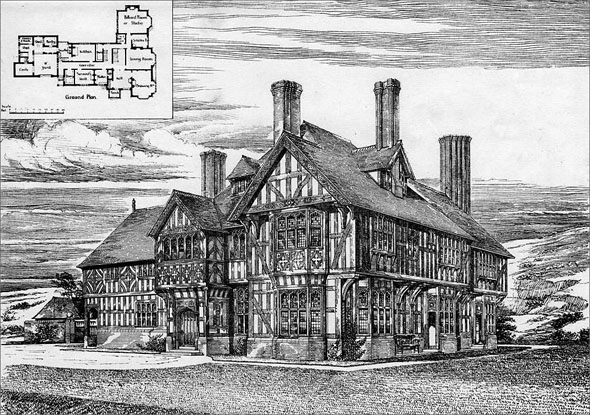
Architect's drawing of Rowden Abbey in 1881

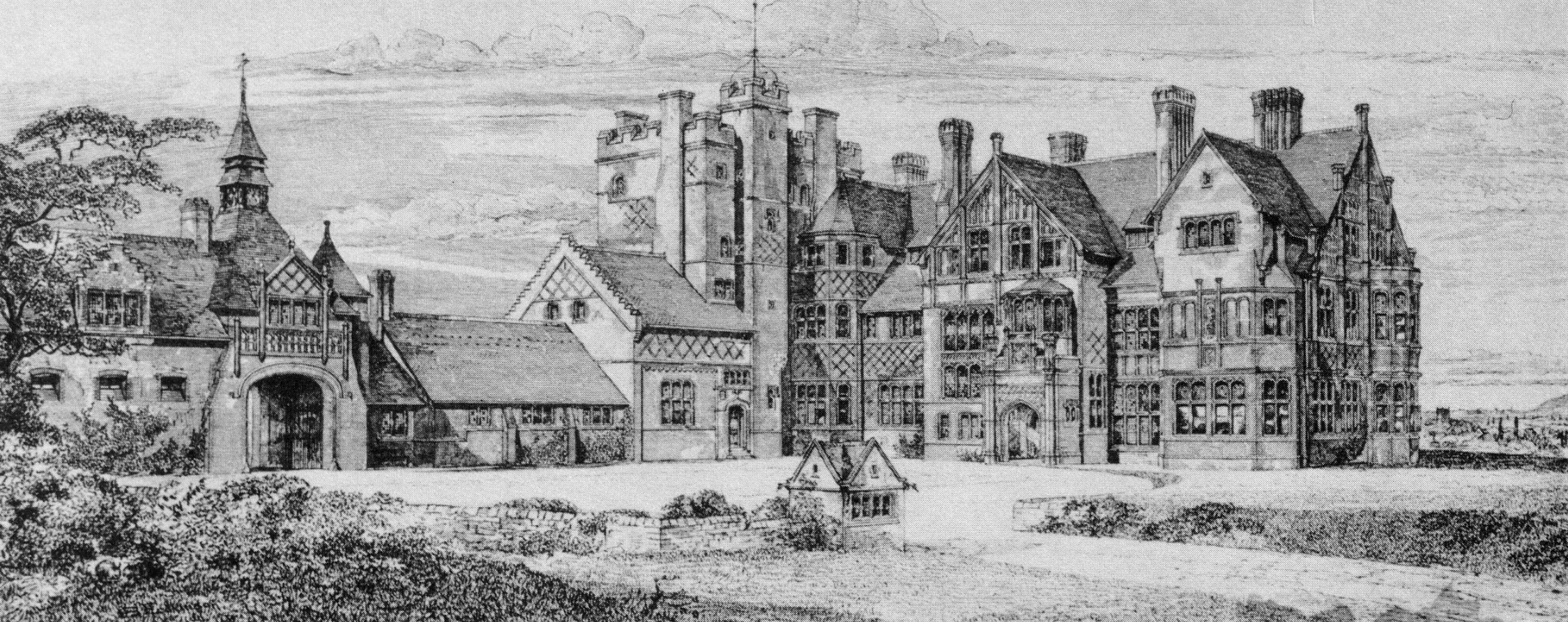
Barrowmore Hall in 1881

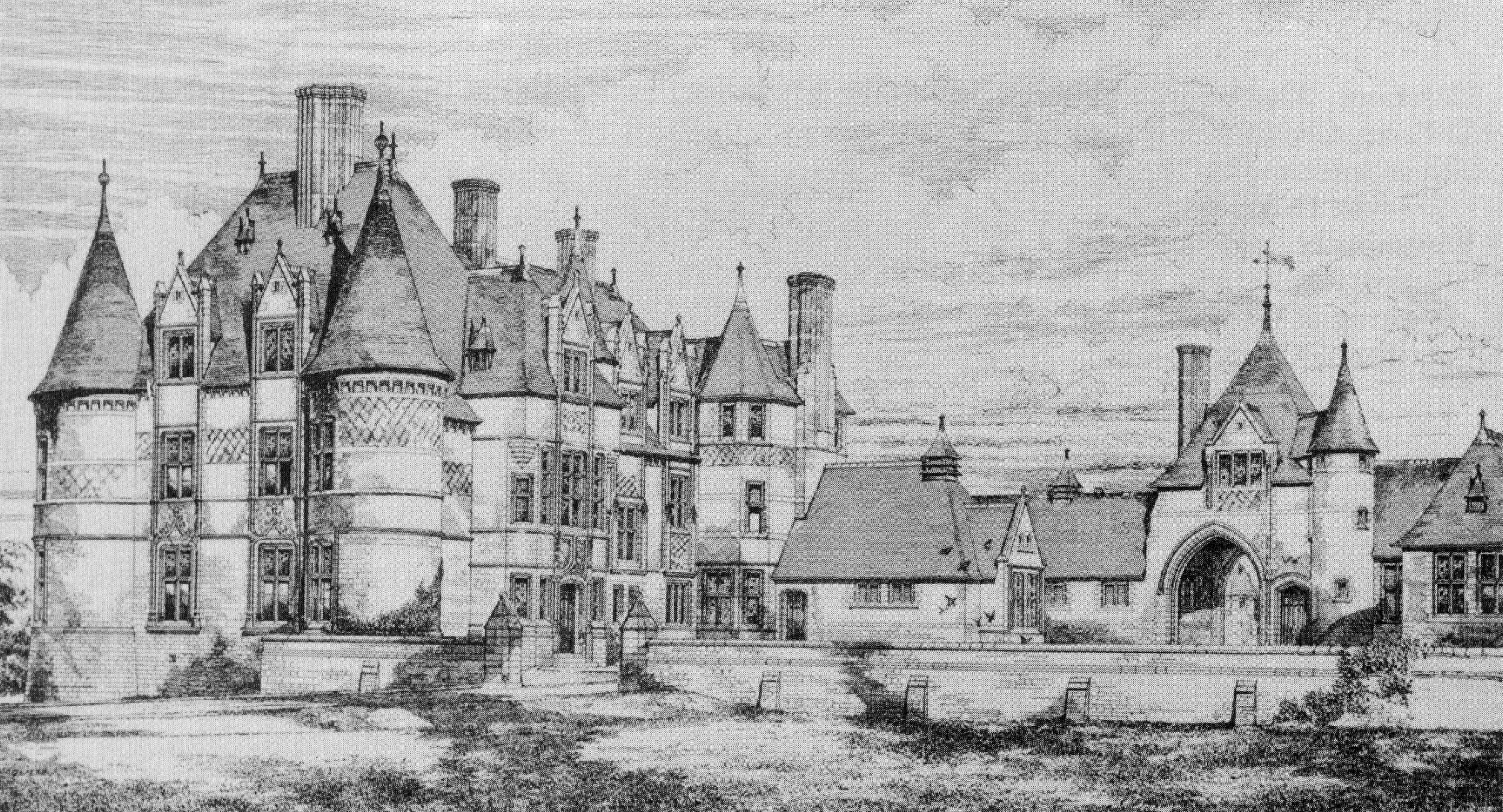
The Paddocks, Eccleston in 1883

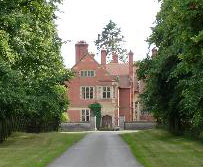
Wigfair Hall

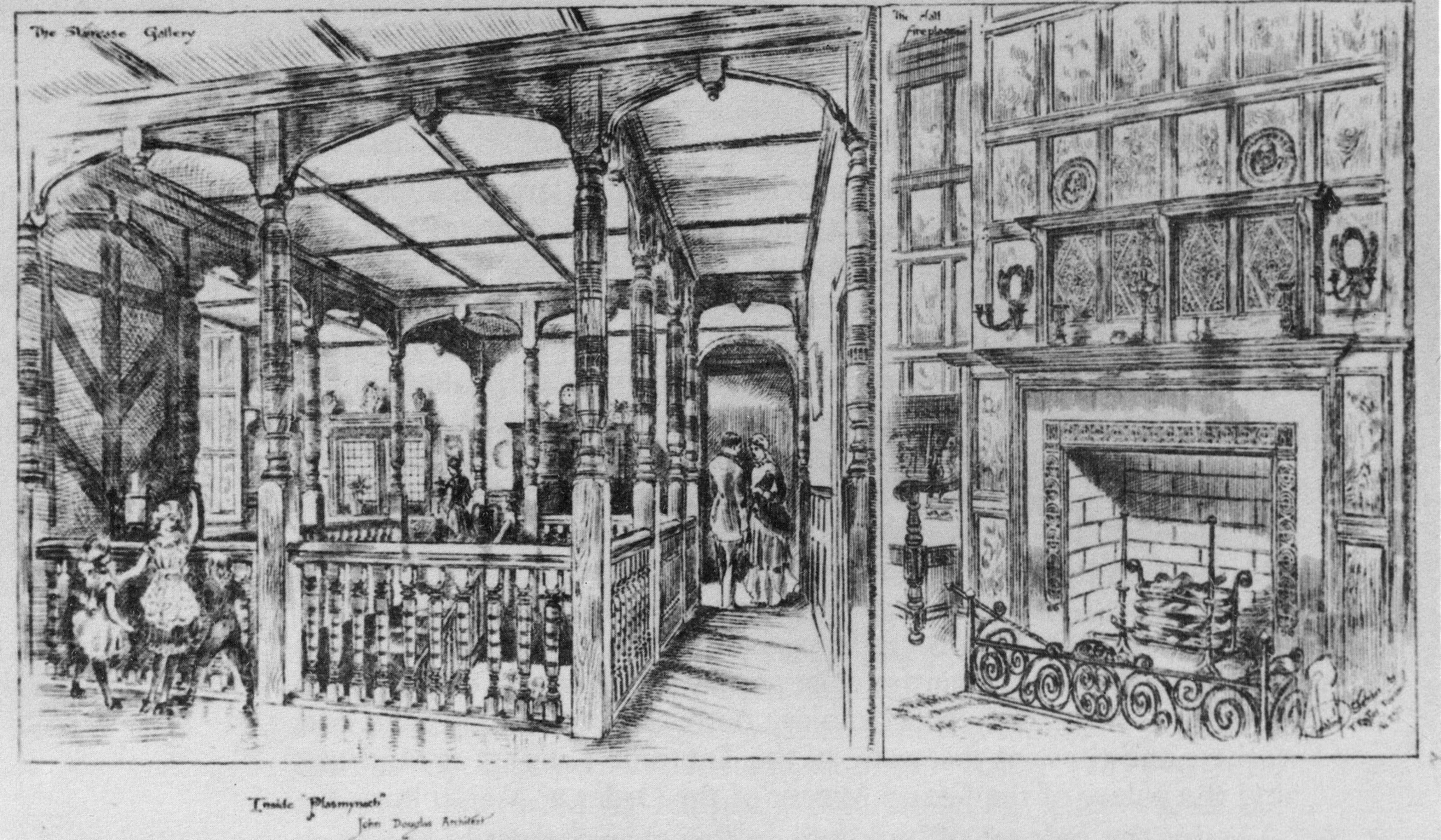
Interior of Plas Mynach in 1884

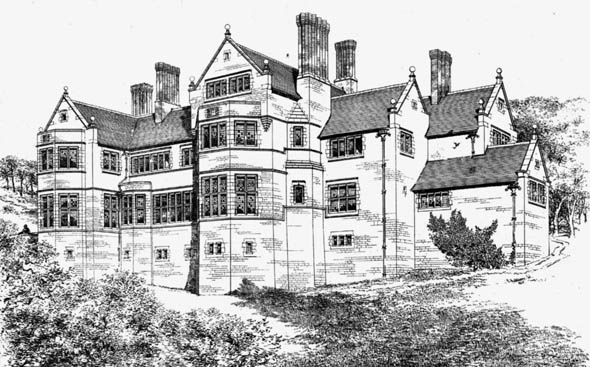
Bronwylfa in 1884

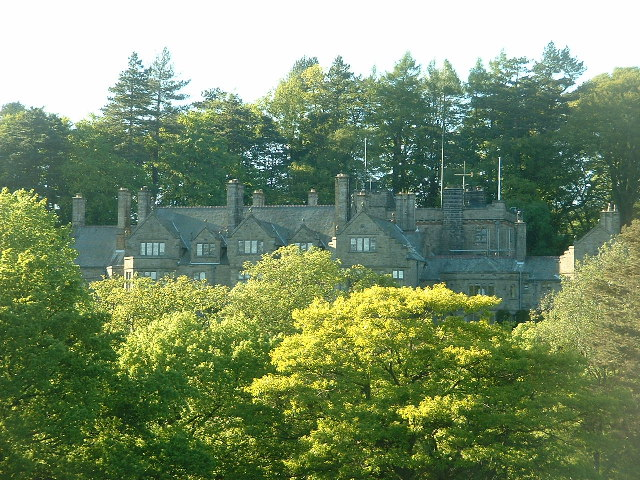
Abbeystead House

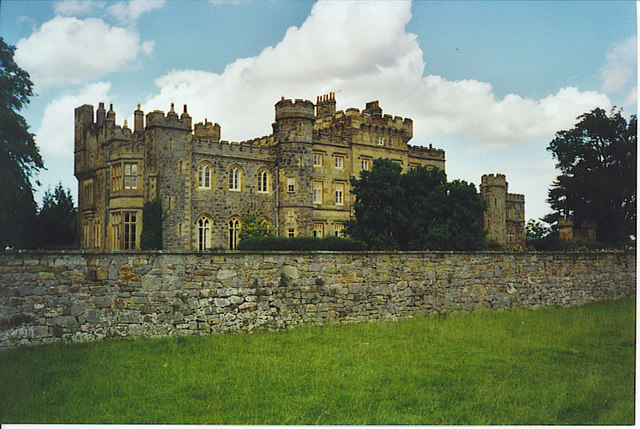
Hawarden Castle

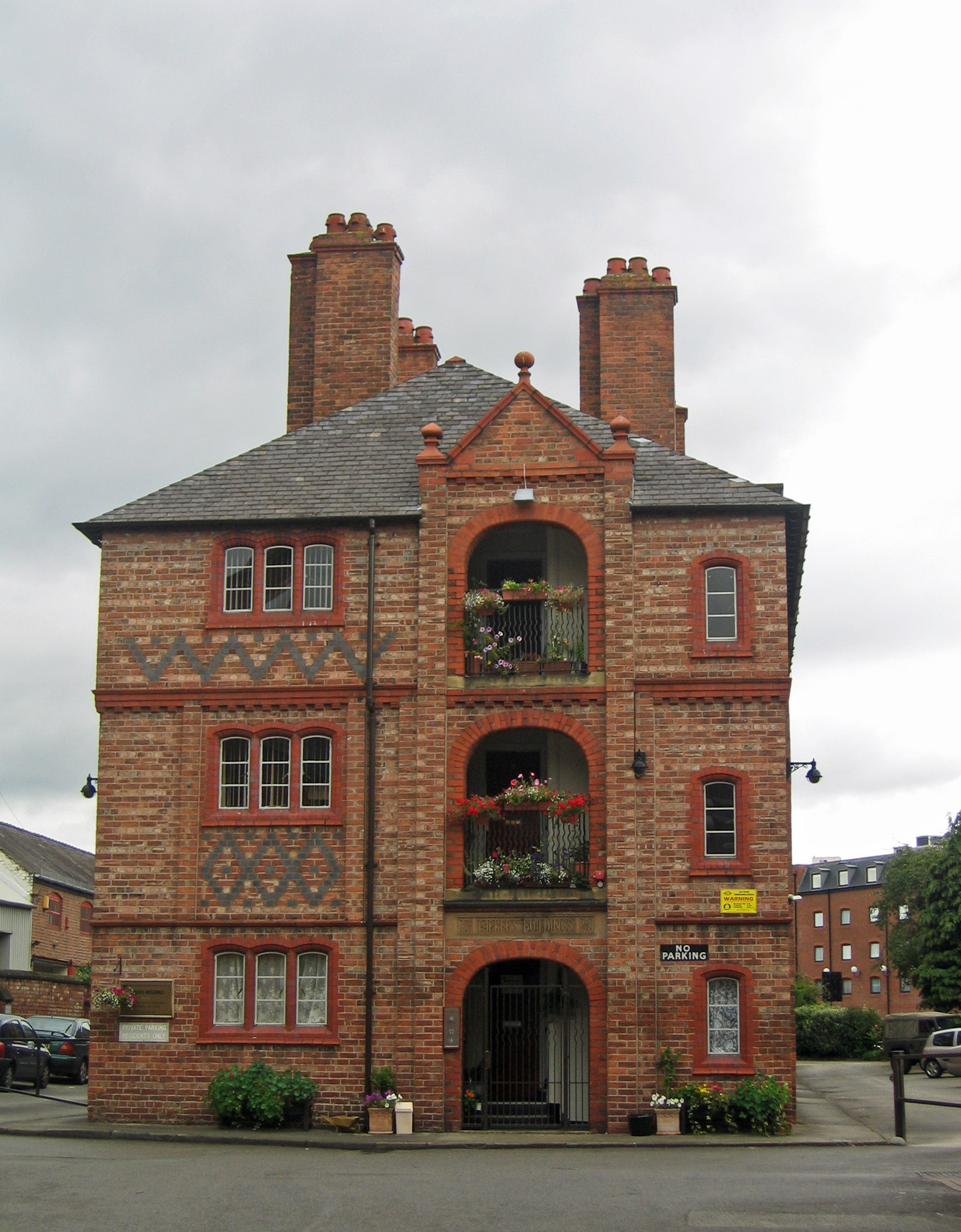
South front of Parker's Buildings, Chester

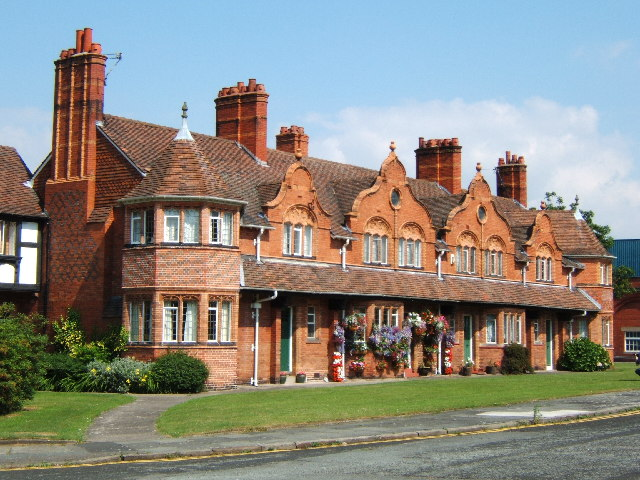
3–9 Bridge Street, one of the terraces of cottages in Port Sunlight designed by Douglas

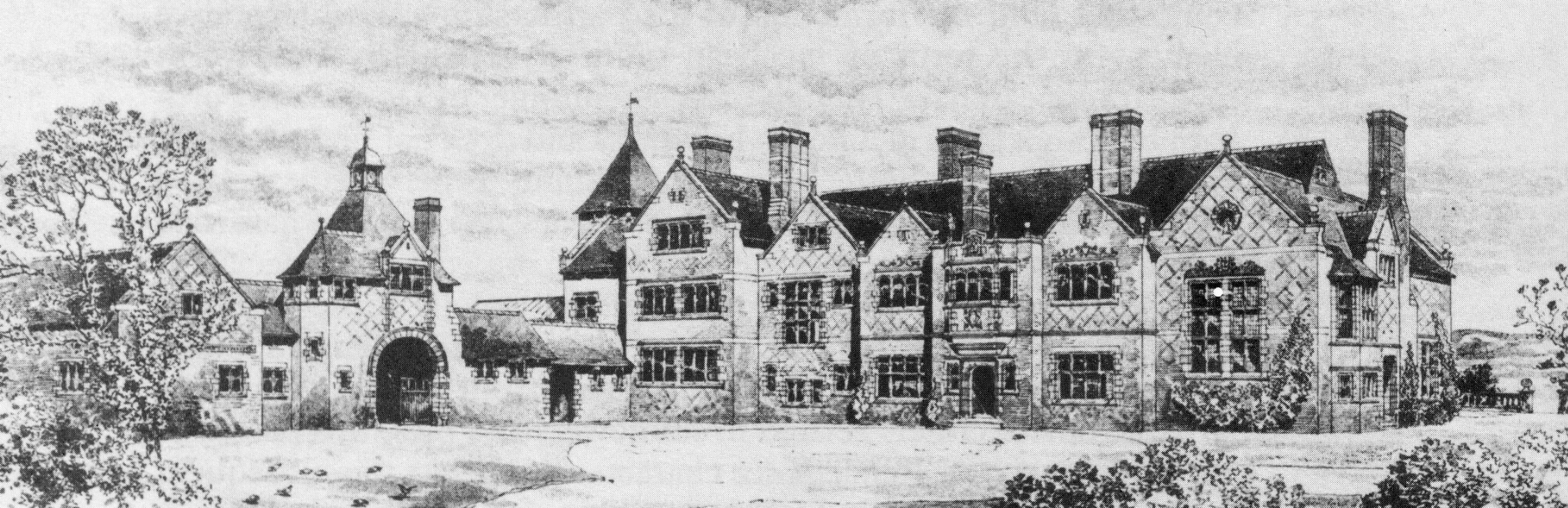
Brocksford Hall in 1893

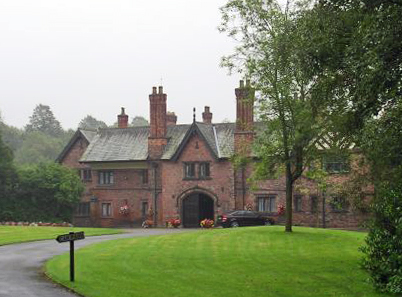
Wardley Hall

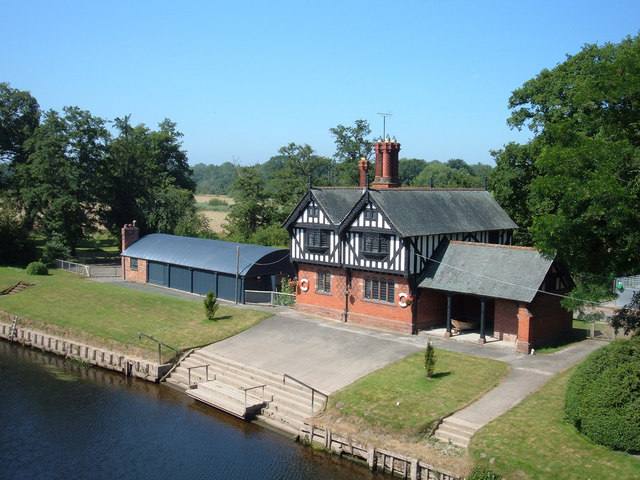
Iron Bridge Lodge, Aldford

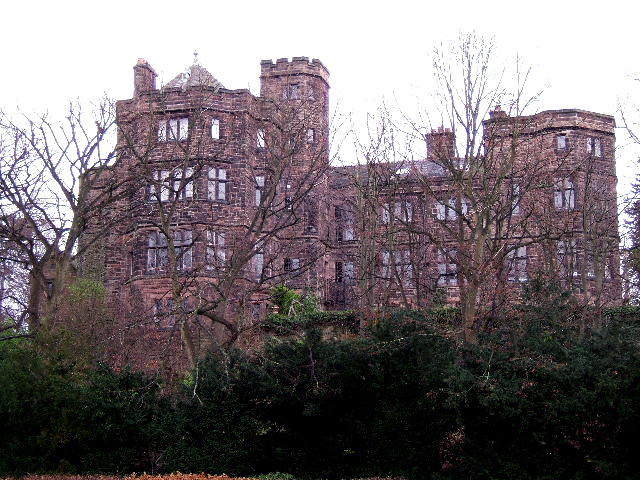
Walmoor Hill

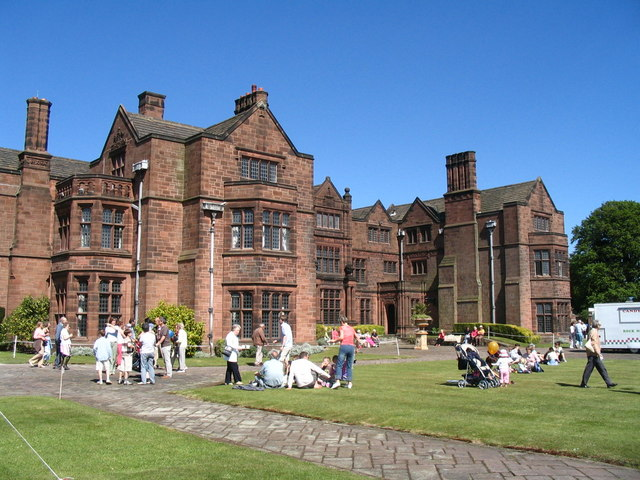
Thornton Manor

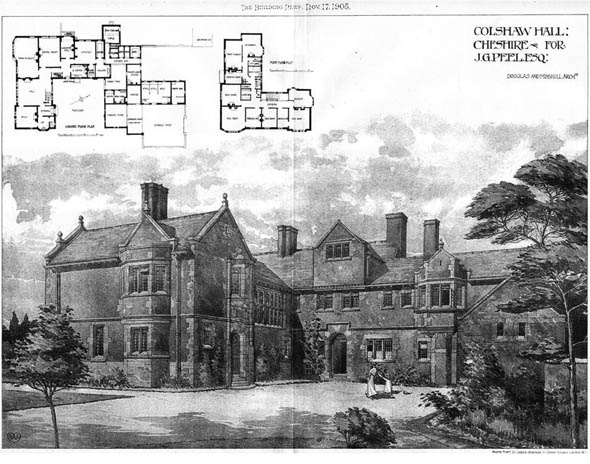
Architects' drawing of Colshaw Hall

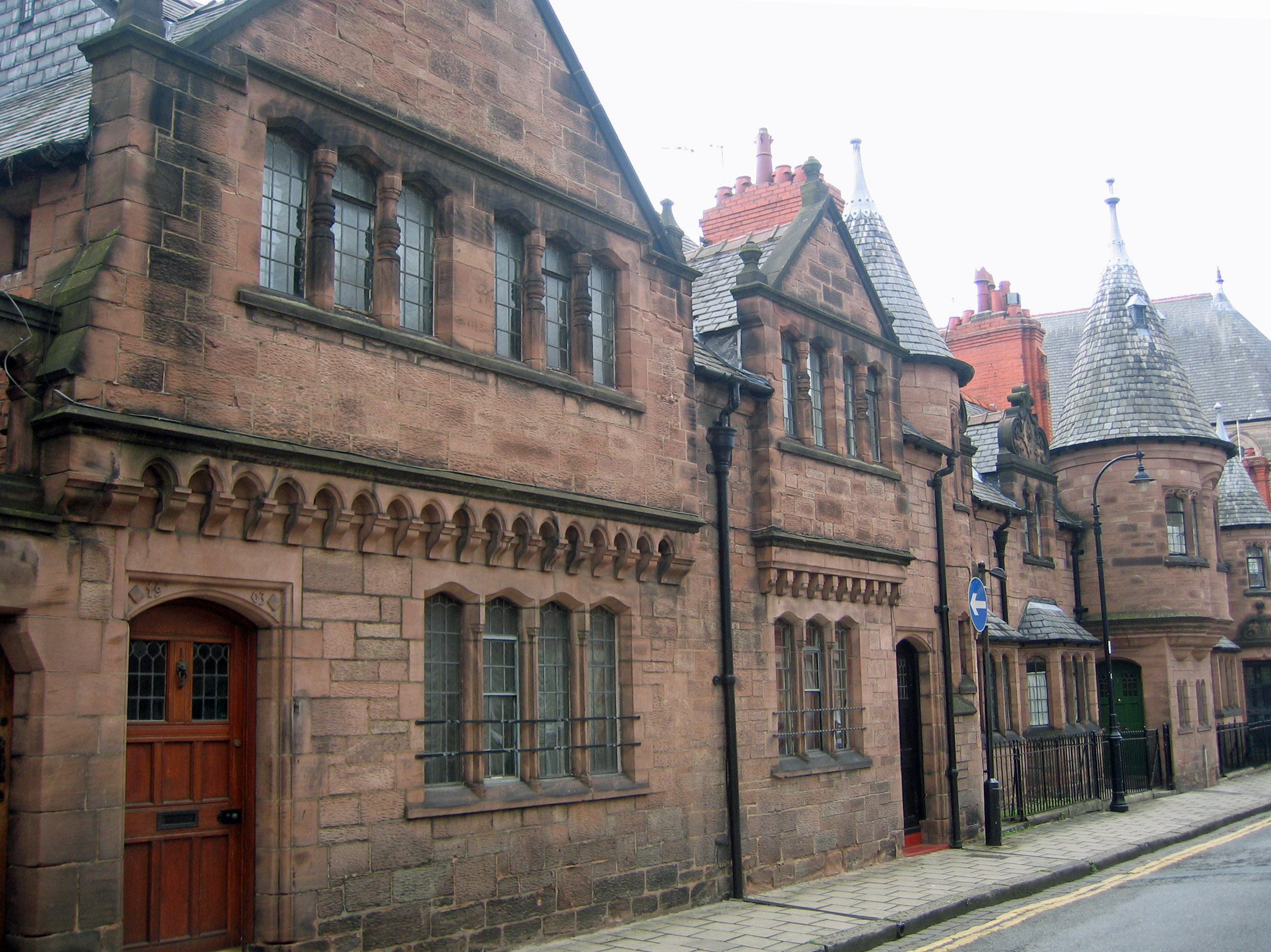
Bath Street, Chester

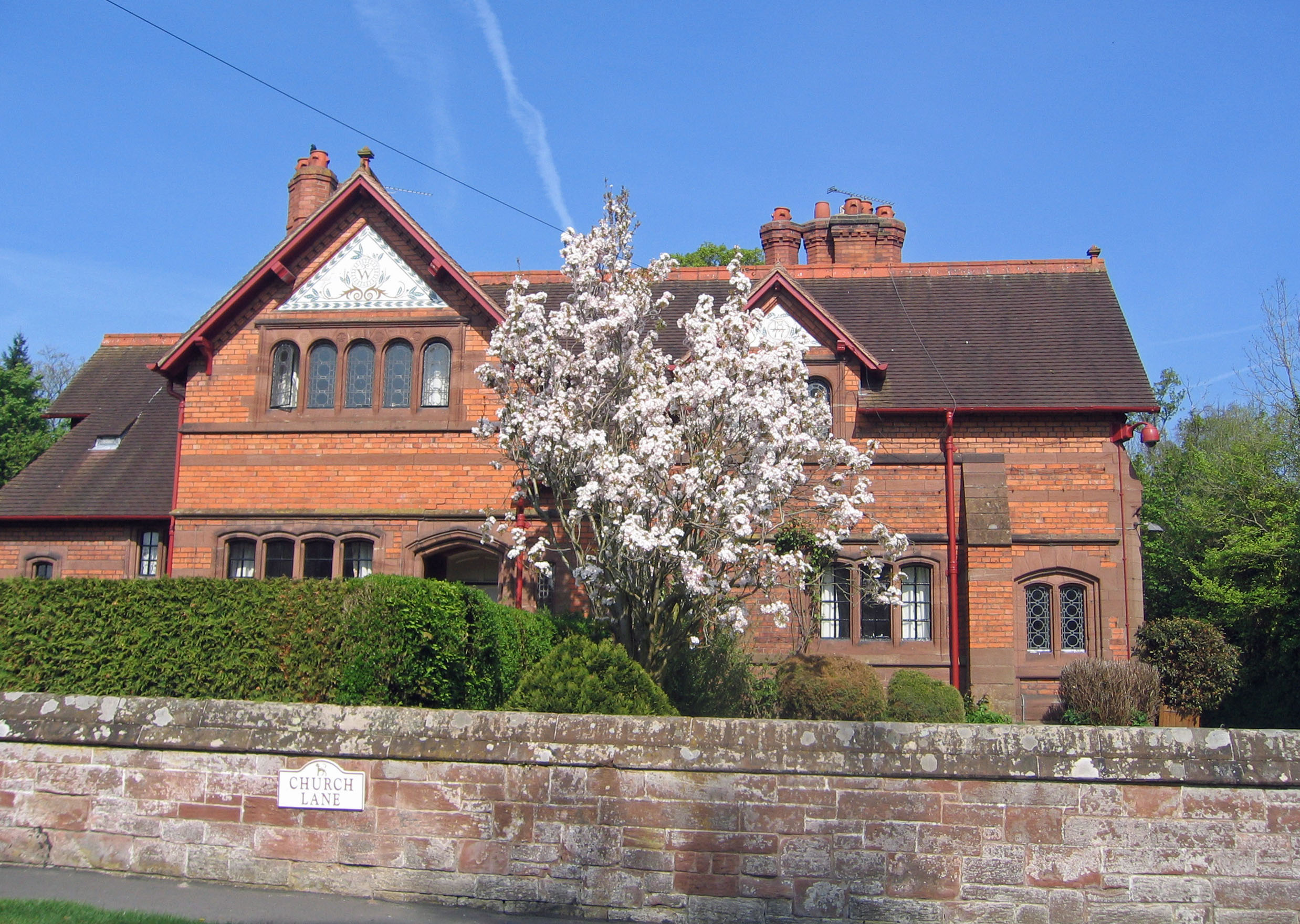
Aldford Lodge

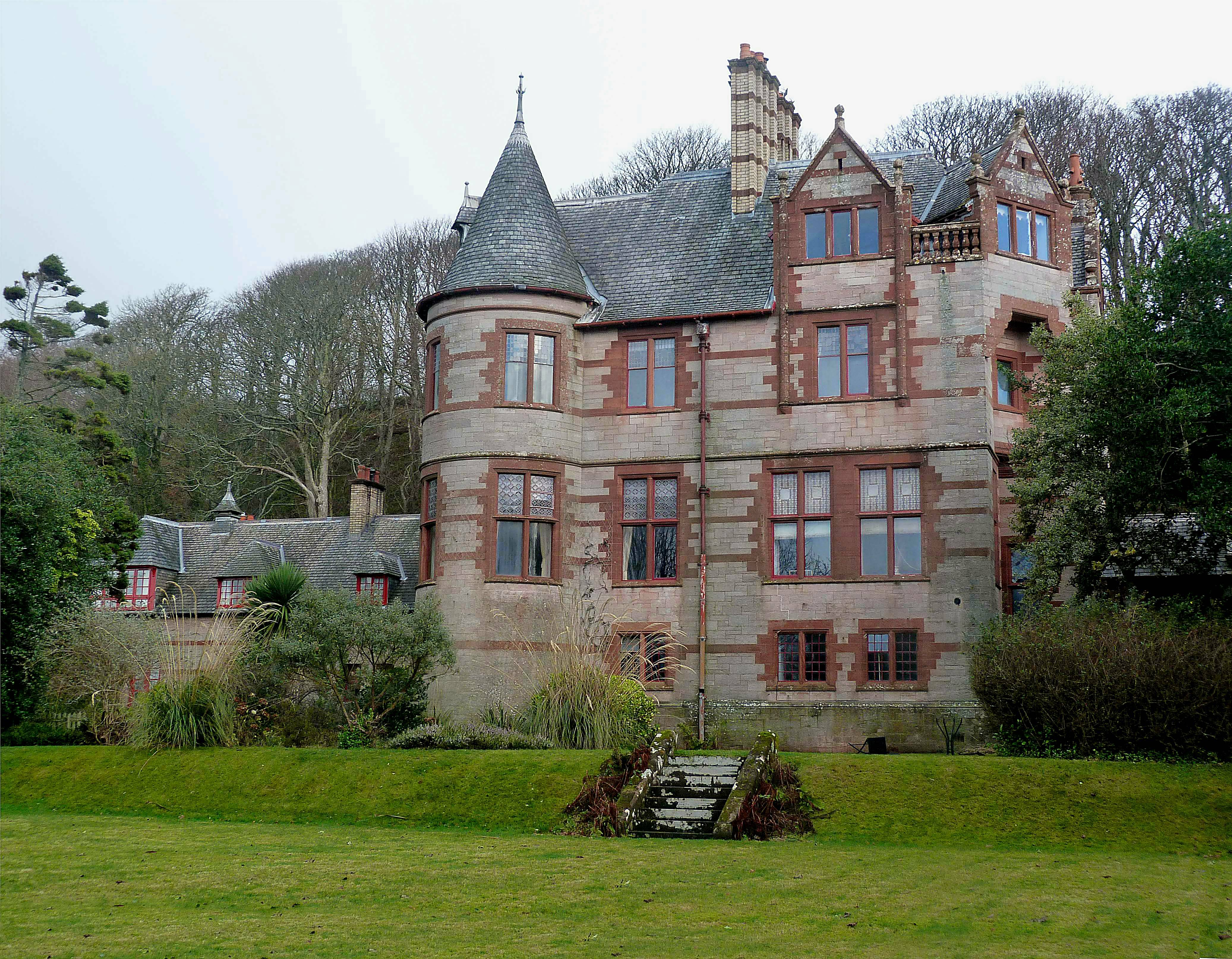
Danefield House, Largs

== See also ==
- List of new churches by John Douglas
- List of church restorations, amendments and furniture by John Douglas
- List of non-ecclesiastical and non-residential works by John Douglas
