= Thomas Totty =

Royal Navy admiral

Rear-Admiral Thomas Totty
- Born: 1746
- Died: 2 June 1802 (aged 55–56)
- Military career
- Allegiance: United Kingdom
- Branch: Royal Navy
- Rank: Rear-Admiral
- Commands: HMS Fury; HMS Sphinx; HMS Dictator; HMS Alfred; HMS Saturn; Leeward Islands Station
- Conflicts: French Revolutionary Wars; Napoleonic Wars

Rear-Admiral Thomas Totty (1746 – 2 June 1802) was a Welsh naval officer of the Napoleonic Wars.

== Life ==
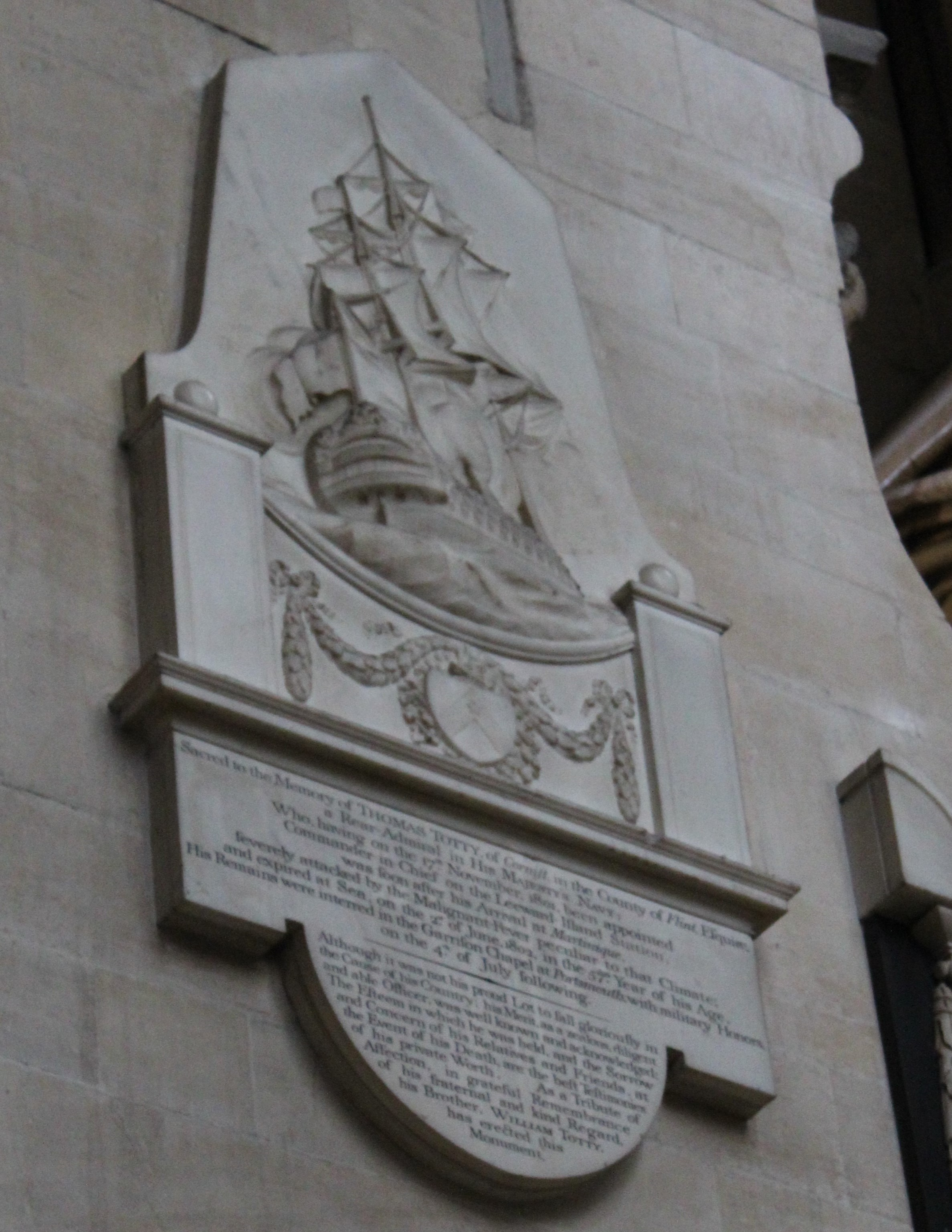
Memorial to Rear Admiral Thomas Totty, Westminster Abbey

Totty was born at Holywell, Flintshire, and was baptised at Holywell parish church on 24 January 1746. He inherited a large farmhouse in the town of Flint which later became Cornist Hall, from his mother's side. His father was an ironmonger and mine owner and had 21 other children – Thomas was one of 18 who survived infancy (another was his youngest brother Hugh, chaplain to George IV, who died aged 101).

He took his examination for lieutenant in 1766 and so appears to have joined the navy about 1760 (the exam was only open to those of six years' service or more). He was promoted to 1st Lieutenant on 30 April 1775 onboard HMS Mercury, then in Boston harbour during the American Revolutionary War's second week and possibly one of the ships bombarding American positions in the run-up to the battle of Bunker Hill. Totty was appointed Master and Commander on 17 February 1778 and then promoted to Post Captain on 31 January 1782, getting the frigate HMS Sphinx as his first command and then (in 1796) HMS Alfred as his second. HMS Alfred was stationed in the West Indies and with her Totty landed troops at St Lucia and Puerto Rico and in February 1798 captured three French ships.

He rose to rear admiral on 1 January 1801, becoming port admiral at Chatham Dockyard the following month. He sailed from Great Yarmouth to join the Baltic fleet on board HMS Invincible, to serve as that fleet's third in command under Hyde Parker and Horatio Nelson (possibly his first service with Nelson). However, the Invincible ran aground off Yarmouth and sank, with more than 400 men lost, though Totty and those of his officers who survived were found not guilty of negligence. Totty then transferred to HMS Zealous and finally reached the Baltic. One letter written to Totty by Nelson concluded:

Allow me now, my dear Sir, both as a public and private man to express to you how much I feel indebted to you as an Admiral for your truly officer-like manner of conducting the King's service and also for the truly kind and handsome manner you have ever expressed yourself towards myself. For believe me, my dear Sir, that with the very highest respect for your character, I feel myself your most obliged and affectionate servant.

Totty was appointed commander of the Leeward Islands Station on 17 November 1801 and set sail for there the following month. Soon after arriving in Martinique he caught yellow fever and died of it at sea on 2 June 1802. He was buried at Portsmouth Garrison Chapel. A memorial was also set up to him by his brother William in the Chapel of St John, St Andrew and St Michael at Westminster Abbey sculpted by John Bacon.

Military offices
Preceded by Sir John Duckworth	Commander-in-Chief, Leeward Islands Station; 1801–1802	Succeeded by Samuel Hood
