= 6–11 Grosvenor Park Road, Chester =

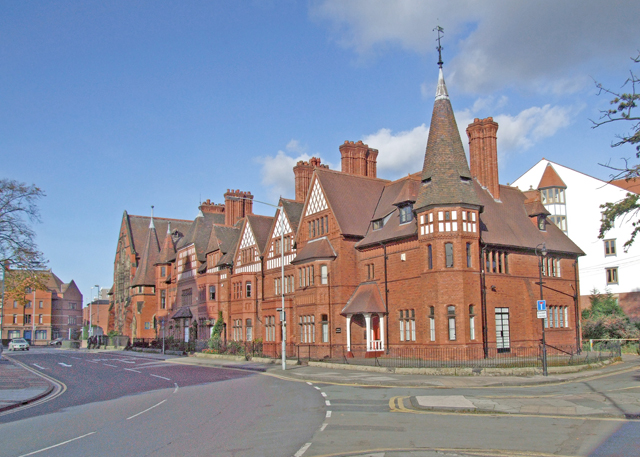
- Front of the terrace from the southwest

- Location in Cheshire
- 53.1914°N 2.8817°W
- Location: Grosvenor Park Road, Chester, Cheshire, England
- OS grid reference: SJ 411 664

History
- Built: c. 1879–80

Site notes
- Architect: John Douglas
- Architectural styles: Mixed Gothic and vernacular

Listed Building – Grade II*
- Designated: 10 January 1972
- Reference no.: 1375834

6–11 Grosvenor Park Road is a terrace of houses in Chester, Cheshire, England. The building is recorded in the National Heritage List for England as a designated Grade II* listed building. It was designed by the Chester architect John Douglas, and the architectural historian Nikolaus Pevsner describes it as "a brilliant group of brick houses".

== Location ==
The houses stand on the east side of Grosvenor Park Road, Chester. This road leads south to the main entrance of Grosvenor Park. Immediately to the north of the houses is Zion Chapel (originally Grosvenor Park Road Baptist Church), which was also designed by Douglas and built around the same time in a complementary architectural style.

== History ==
Grosvenor Park had been developed in the 1860s on land given to the city of Chester by Richard Grosvenor, 2nd Marquess of Westminster, who also paid for its design by Edward Kemp. Its entrance lodge had been designed by Douglas. Both the marquess and his successor, the 1st Duke of Westminster, were concerned that the maintenance and improvement of the approach to the park should be carefully handled. A scheme for building houses on the approach had been prepared in 1872, but this was not carried out. Towards the end of the decade, the terrace of houses was built, with Douglas as architect, developer, and landlord.

== Architecture ==
The building consists of six joined houses, each of which is different, with a turret at each end; the left turret is surmounted by a ball finial and that on the right has a weathervane. The terrace is built in Ruabon red brick with terracotta dressings, and plaster panels on the top floor. Each house has three storeys, the top storey of which consists either of a gabled projection from the roof or in the case of the right-hand house, a dormer. The roofs are steeply sloping and made of red-brown clay tiles. The middle four houses have projecting one- or two-storey canted bays containing windows which are either mullioned or mullioned and transomed. Large ribbed brick chimneys rise from the roof. The architectural style has a mix of Gothic and vernacular elements.

== See also ==
- Grade II* listed buildings in Cheshire West and Chester
- List of houses and associated buildings by John Douglas
