= Dedwyddfa =

House in Denbighshire, Wales

Coordinates: 53.1167°N 3.3053°W

Dedwyddfa is a house in Bryn Goodman, Ruthin, Denbighshire, Wales. It is a Grade II listed building, dated 1886, built for the Cornwallis-West family of Ruthin Castle. Its design is attributed to the Chester architect John Douglas. It is one of a pair of houses, the other being Coetmor which was definitely designed by Douglas. Both houses had large gardens, and were well placed for access to the railway.

It is described as "a fine example of the Domestic revival style" ..."retaining good character and detail".

== See also ==
- List of houses and associated buildings by John Douglas
