= Listed buildings in Poulton, Cheshire =

Poulton is a former civil parish, now in the parish of Poulton and Pulford, in Cheshire West and Chester, England. It contains seven listed buildings, all of which are designated by English Heritage at Grade II, and included in the National Heritage List for England. This grade is the lowest of the three gradings given to listed buildings and is applied to "buildings of national importance and special interest". The parish is entirely rural, and forms part of the estate of the Dukes of Westminster. The listed buildings are all domestic, consisting of houses and a lodge.

Name and location	Photograph	Date	Notes
Chapel House and former dairy 53.1189°N 2.9034°W	—	17th century	Chapel House is a farmhouse, and the attached former dairy, which dates from the 19th century, has been converted into a cottage. The buildings are in brick with slate roofs. The farmhouse has a square plan, 2 1/2 storeys and three bays. It has an iron verandah carried on four Doric columns. The cottage is in two storeys and four bays.
Green Farmhouse; 53.1245°N 2.9044°W		18th century	The farmhouse was altered in the middle of the 19th century, and in 1889–90 further alterations were made to the rear by John Douglas for the 1st Duke of Westminster. It is a symmetrical brick house with tile roofs. The house has three storeys and a five-bay front. The end gables and the rear extension have blue brick diapering, and the gables have shaped terracotta copings. The windows are iron casements. Three of the chimneys have spiral brick moulding.
Green Farm Cottages; 53.12745°N 2.90717°W	—	1859	A pair of farm cottages built for the 2nd Marquess of Westminster. They are in brick with sandstone dressings, and a gabled slate roof. The building has a T-shaped plan, and is in 1 1/2 storeys. The windows are iron lattice casements. The two chimneys each have four rectangular flues.
Poulton Hall Farmhouse; 53.1305°N 2.9044°W	—	1860	The farmhouse was built for the 2nd Marquess of Westminster. It is in brick with a gabled slate roof. The building has two storeys. It is long, in seven bays, with cheesemaking facilities at the rear. The windows are casements, and there are three rectangular chimneys with sandstone caps.
The Schoolhouse; 53.12745°N 2.90785°W	—	1866	This was built a school and a schoolmaster's house for the 2nd Marquess of Westminster. It was later used as St Chad's Mission Church, then converted into a house. It is built in brick with sandstone dressings and gabled slate roofs. The original house is in 1 1/2 storeys, with the school attached to the left. The window openings are mullioned and transomed and contain iron diamond-pane casements.
Black and White Cottages; 53.1262°N 2.8890°W	—	1886	A pair of cottages designed by Douglas and Fordham for the 1st Duke of Westminster. They are timber-framed on a sandstone plinth with slate roofs. The cottages have two storeys, the upper storey being jettied, with gables carried on shaped brackets. The windows are mullioned, and the brick chimneys have spiral moulding.
Iron Bridge Lodge; 53.1347°N 2.8717°W		1894	A lodge designed by Douglas and Fordham for the 1st Duke of Westminster. It is in two storeys with an attic, the ground floor being built in red brick, and the jettied upper storey and attic being timber-framed. The windows in the lower storey are mullioned and transomed, and in the upper storey are two oriel windows. The chimneys have blue-brick diapering and spiral moulded flues.
