= Danefield House, Largs =

Danefield House
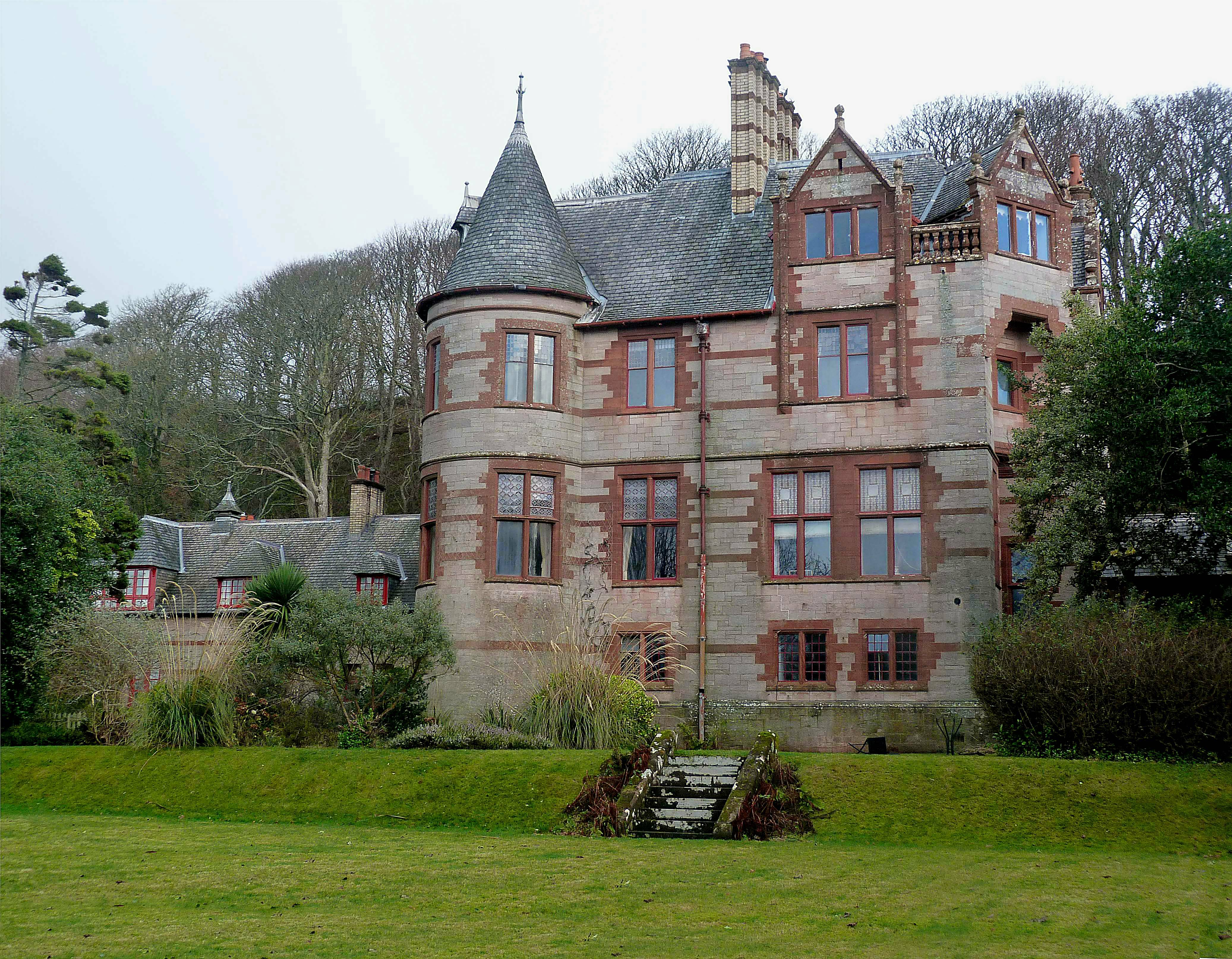

- Location in Ayrshire
- 55.8095°N 4.8811°W
- Location: Largs, North Ayrshire, Scotland
- OS grid reference: NS 195,611

History
- Built: 1883
- Built for: William Crum

Site notes
- Architect: John Douglas

Listed Building – Category B
- Designated: 8 September 1982
- Reference no.: LB37169

Danefield House, Largs, North Ayrshire, Scotland, is a late 19th-century villa designed for William Crum by John Douglas. Douglas's only house in Scotland, it is a Category B listed building.

== History and description ==
The house is dated 1883 and was designed by John Douglas for W. G. Crum. The Crums were connected by marriage with Larg's most notable resident, William Thomson, 1st Baron Kelvin, who had built a large mansion, Netherhall, in the town. They also rented Mere Old Hall in Cheshire, the county in which Douglas was most prolific.

Pevsner describes the style of Danefield as "a simplified version of (Douglas's) Arts and Crafts Paddocks (with a) dash of Scots Baronial". Of two storeys, with substantial cellars and attics, the villa is constructed of yellow ashlar with old red sandstone dressings. It is a Category B listed building.

== Sources ==
- Close, Rob; Riches, Anne (2012). Ayrshire and Arran. The Buildings of Scotland. New Haven and London: Yale University Press. ISBN 978-0-300-14170-2. OCLC 1006288155.
- Hubbard, Edward (1991). The Work of John Douglas. London: The Victorian Society. ISBN 0-901657-16-6. OCLC 886674687.

== See also ==
- List of houses and associated buildings by John Douglas
