= Coetmor =

House in Denbighshire, Wales

Coordinates: 53.1162°N 3.3052°W

Coetmor is a house in Bryn Goodman, Ruthin, Denbighshire, Wales. It is designated by Cadw as a Grade II listed building dated 1886. It was built for Col. Cornwallis-West and was designed by the Chester architect John Douglas. The house was originally named Elm Villa and later Coetmor, the surname of subsequent owners. It is one of a pair of houses, the other being Dedwyddfa, both isolated houses with large gardens, but well placed for access to the railway.

It is described as "a fine example of the work of John Douglas, with particularly good internal and external detail in the Domestic revival style".

== See also ==
- List of houses and associated buildings by John Douglas
