= Plas Mynach =

Country house in Barmouth, Gwynedd, Wales

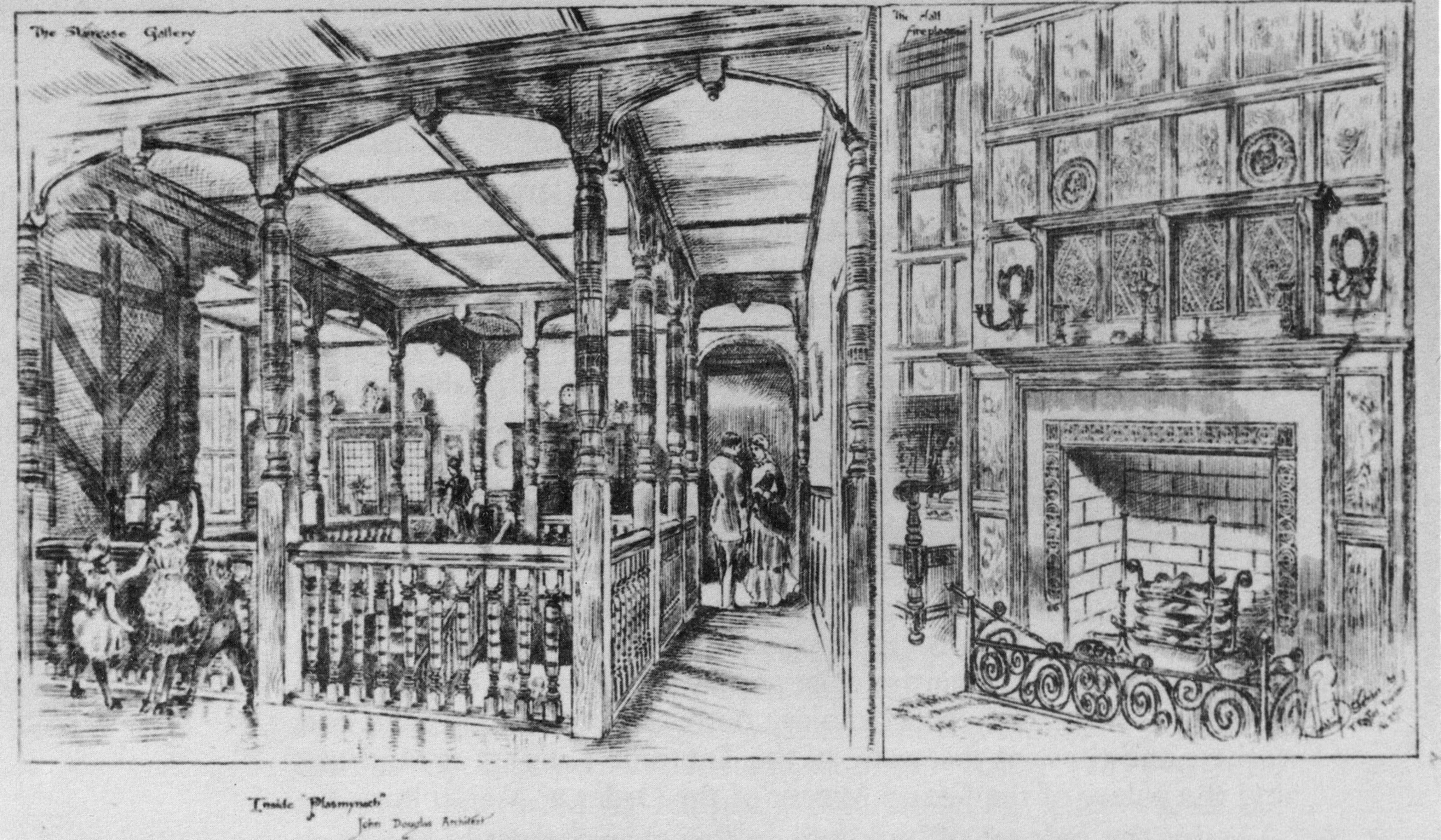
- Interior showing the staircase gallery on the left and the hall fireplace on the right
- Interactive map of Plas Mynach
- 52.7292°N 4.0627°W
- Location: Barmouth, Gwynedd, Wales

History
- Built: 1883
- Built for: W. H. Jones

Site notes
- Architect: John Douglas
- Architectural style: Welsh vernacular

Listed Building – Grade II*
- Designated: 25 February 1992
- Reference no.: 5244

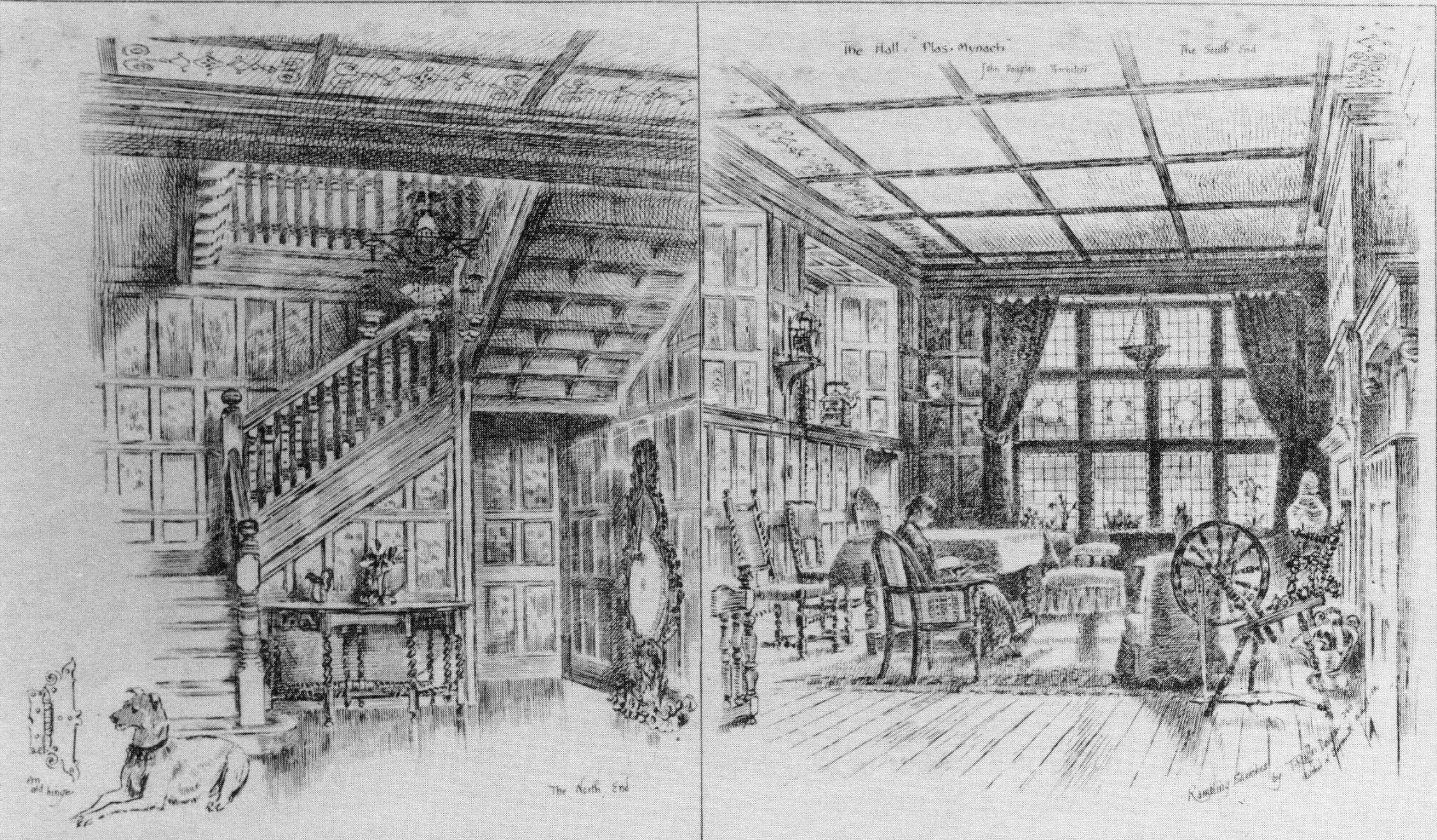
Interior showing the staircase on the left and the hall on the right

Plas Mynach is a large country house in Barmouth, Gwynedd, Wales. It is designated by Cadw as a Grade II* listed building, and stands in a prominent position overlooking the sea.

== History ==
The house was designed in 1883 by the Chester architect John Douglas for W. H. Jones.

== Architecture ==
Plas Mynach is built in local stone with a slate roof. Its most distinctive features are a low spreading tower with a stair turret and stepped gables. Its plan consists of a main range with two storeys to the south, single-storey service ranges to the north, and a gatehouse range to the east of the three-storey tower. Internally "the hall, staircase and landing provide a classic example of Douglas's domestic joinery". The door knocker came from Nuremberg.

== External features ==
The lodge to the house, also designed by Douglas for Jones, is designated at Grade II.

== Critique ==
In 1884 the architect Raffles Davison stated that the house "very nearly realised to me the idea of a perfect country house" and inside was "one of the most charming halls I have seen". In his biography of Douglas, Hubbard states it has "a strength and austere simplicity unusual in Douglas's work". The description in the listing refers to it as "one of the more important country houses by John Douglas, in an apparently little-altered condition".

== See also ==
- List of houses and associated buildings by John Douglas
