= Llety'r Dryw =

House in Colwyn Bay, Wales

- Interactive map of Llety'r Dryw
- 53.2899°N 3.7106°W
- Location: Abergele Road, Colwyn Bay, Conwy, Wales

History
- Built: 1893
- Built for: John Eden

Site notes
- Architect: Douglas & Fordham
- Architectural style: Vernacular
- Governing body: North Wales Police Authority

Listed Building – Grade II
- Designated: 25 July 1994
- Reference no.: 14665

Llety'r Dryw is a house in Abergele Road, Colwyn Bay, Conwy, Wales. It is a Grade II listed building. It was built in 1893 for John Eden (uncle of Anthony Eden) and designed by the Chester firm of architects, Douglas and Fordham. In 1960 it came into the possession of Denbighshire County Council and was used as the Fire Brigade Headquarters; then in 1990 it was taken over by the North Wales Police Authority. The house has been described as a "simple stone-built villa", which has been "inspired by 17th-century vernacular work of Northern England". The listing description says it is a "freely interpreted neo-vernacular house of considerable architectural quality".

It is built in random rubble, with red sandstone dressings; it has a slate roof with a crest of red tiles, and brick chimneystacks with stone caps. It consists of a main range, with cross wings having coped and finialed gables, and a service extension behind. Much of the original joinery remains in the interior of the house.

== See also ==
- List of houses and associated buildings by John Douglas
