= Wigfair Hall =

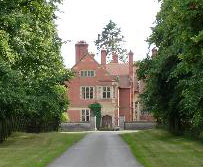
- Main entrance of Wigfair Hall
- Interactive map of Wigfair Hall
- 53.2292°N 3.4578°W
- Location: Cefn Meiriadog, Denbighshire, Wales

History
- Built: 1882–84
- Built for: Rev R. H. Howard

Site notes
- Architect: John Douglas
- Architectural style: Jacobethan

Listed Building – Grade II*
- Designated: 31 March 1983
- Reference no.: 3841

Wigfair Hall is a large country house standing in an elevated position above the River Elwy near the village of Cefn Meiriadog, Denbighshire, Wales. It is a Grade II* listed building.

In 2017 Wigfair Hall was renovated and is now primarily used as a special event and wedding venue.

== History ==
Wigfair was built on the site of an older house between 1882 and 1884 for Rev R. H. Howard. It was designed by the Chester architect John Douglas. Its large tower was originally a water tower for the house and was used to generate electricity. The equipment for this purpose, including the tanks, pipework and generator, although no longer in use, is still present.

== Architecture ==
=== Exterior ===
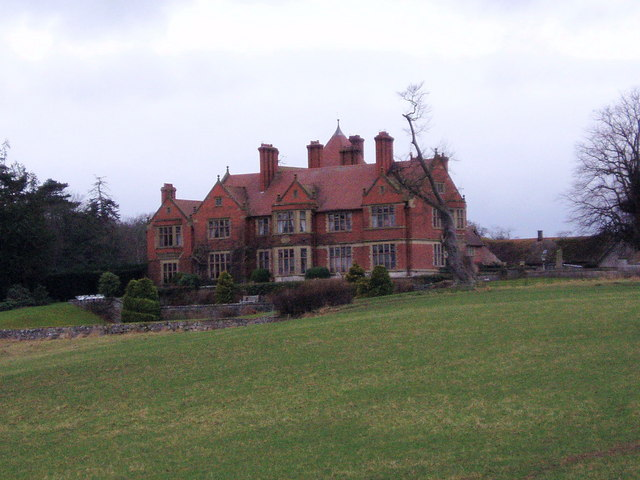
Wigfair

The house is in Jacobethan style, constructed in red Ruabon brick on a limestone plinth with sandstone dressings, and a Ruabon tile roof. It has an L-shape with a main north wing and a west service wing. The tower, with its pyramidal roof, rises from the west wing. Projecting from the angle between the wings is the canted staircase window. The main entrance is at the right side of the end of the gabled north wing, under an oriel window.

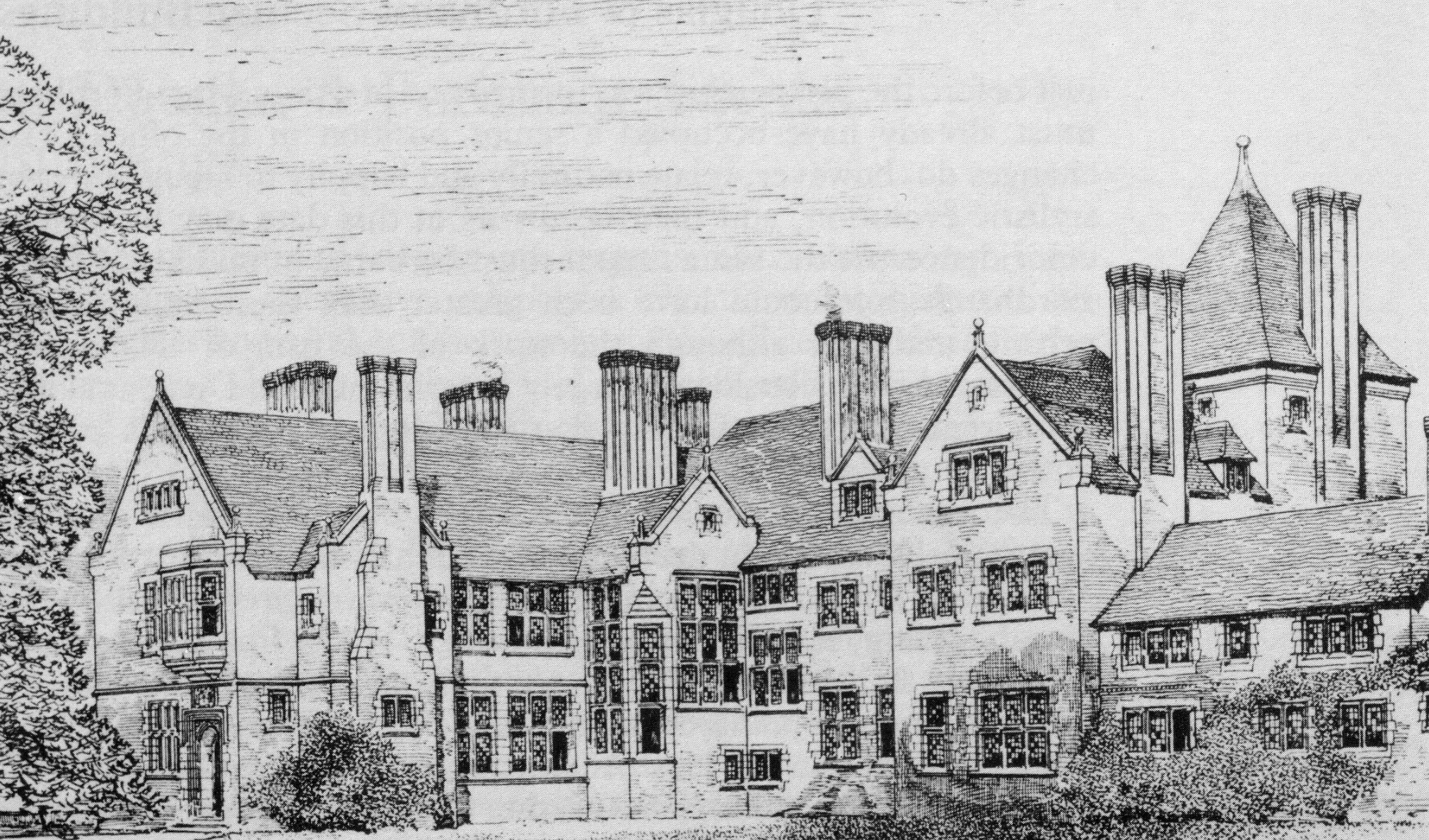
Wigfair in 1885 with the main wing on the left and the service wing on the right

=== Interior ===
This includes "some good Douglas woodwork", it is "largely unaltered and retains high-quality original fittings in polished oak". These fittings include an inner entrance screen, panelling, doors and architraves, fireplaces, a fitted sideboard, and a balustraded gallery. The plaster ceilings are decorated with moulding and compartments, and in the stairhall is a limestone fireplace.

== See also ==
- List of houses and associated buildings by John Douglas
