= 1 and 2 Tai Cochion =

Pair of cottages in Flintshire, Wales

Coordinates: 52.2162°N 2.2501°W

1 and 2 Tai Cochion consists of a pair of joined cottages in the village of Nannerch, Flintshire, Wales. Each of the cottages is designated by Cadw as a Grade II listed building. They were built for the railway engineer William Barber Buddicom in 1877–88 and designed by the Chester architect John Douglas.

The cottages are two-storey and are built with brick and tiled hipped roofs in the vernacular revival style typical of Douglas, with influences from the Old English style of Norman Shaw. Each is a mirror image of the other and they share a central chimney stack; the cottages are divided by a buttress on the ground floor. The windows are arranged asymmetrically and have moulded brick, mullions, and sill bands, as well as a string course between the floors. Each cottage has a five-light mullioned window positioned inward and a single-light window outward on the lower floor. The upper floor has a pair of 2-light windows on the inner side and a pair of 3-light windows on the outer side, both under a rendered gable decorated with a lozenge brickwork pattern. Both cottages have entrances on the side wall, with front-offset doorways featuring cambered heads and boarded doors with strap hinges, topped by small windows under the eaves. Toward the rear, each cottage has a single-light window on the lower floor, a two-light mullioned window on the upper floor, and an additional recessed window on the lower level. Both cottages have rear extensions added in the 20th century.

== See also ==
- List of houses and associated buildings by John Douglas
