= Colshaw Hall =

Grade II listed country house in Cheshire, England

Coordinates: 53.2658°N 2.3278°W

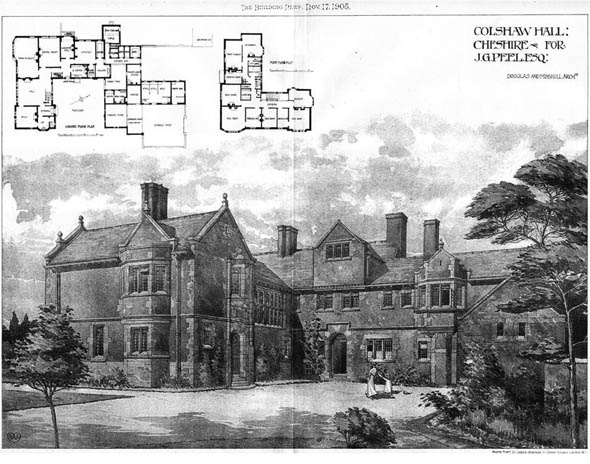
Architects' drawing of Colshaw Hall

Colshaw Hall is a large house in Peover Superior, Cheshire, England. It is recorded in the National Heritage List for England as a designated Grade II listed building. The house was built in 1903 and designed by the Chester architects Douglas and Minshull. It is constructed in red brick with stone dressings and a stone roof. It has two storeys plus an attic. Its architectural style is Tudor Revival. It was extended and altered by Percy Worthington in 1907.

In the First World War, the house was used as an auxiliary hospital, and during the 20th century, it was damaged by fire, and parts of it were demolished.

In the early 1980s, the house was purchased by property/business entrepreneur, Raymond Slater who restored the house keeping what was left of the original fixtures and fittings. The restoration included acquisition of the neighboring farm Merrydale from Mr. Wainwright. This paved the way for the construction of a nine-hole golf course designed by golf professionals Dave Thomas and Hugh Lewis - a serial raconteur; a system of alternative tees enabled 18 convincing holes to be played. Despite its proportions and not least, its private ownership the course was well-specified including a full underground irrigation system and ground drainage (undertaken by contractor PE Goode of Goostrey). Slater invested heavily in the formal landscaping erecting a waterfall and an oriental garden complete with pagodas, stone Buddha's and several ponds filled with Koi carp (the entire stock disappeared subsequent to his departure to Guernsey, a theft rumored to be linked to a local farmer).

As the 1990s recession took hold along with a trail of overly ambitious business decisions, Slater (formerly in the Times Rich List with an estimated wealth in excess of £200 million) was plunged into financial difficulties and sold the Hall to his business partner Valerie Edwards of the Manchester United FC family. During her ownership the property was sometimes used by a sports management company linked to the golfer Andrew "Chubby" Chandler. Regular, national TV screened interviews of sports personalities were undertaken around the fantastic swimming pool complex. Later it was sold to David Irlam, of the haulage company James Irlam and Company. He laid the grounds to pasture, converted some of the outbuildings into residential accommodation for members of his family, and returned the house into a family home, in a condition as near as possible to its original state. Irlam also made the hall available for use by charities, but later decided to move out. The hall is now available for hire for functions and for weddings, and is managed by members of the Irlam family.

== See also ==
- Listed buildings in Peover Superior
- List of houses and associated buildings by John Douglas
