= Green Farmhouse, Poulton =

Coordinates: 53.1245°N 2.9043°W

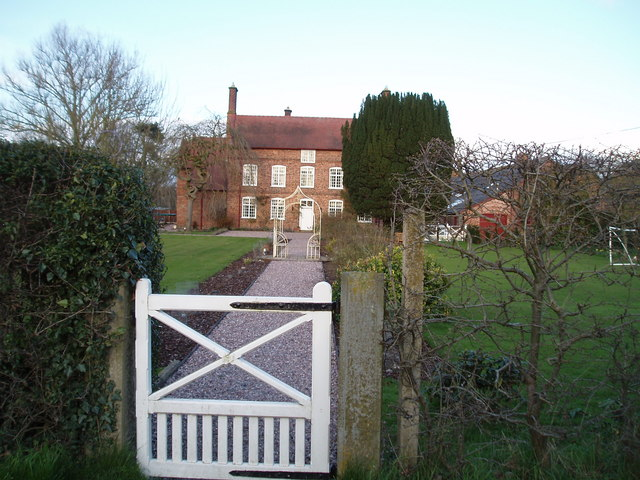
Green Farmhouse

Green Farmhouse is on the east side of the Straight Mile, Poulton, Cheshire, England. It is recorded in the National Heritage List for England as a designated Grade II listed building.

The house dates from the 18th century and was altered in the middle of the 19th century for the 2nd Marquess of Westminster. In 1889–90 further alterations and additions were made for the 1st Duke of Westminster, which were designed by the Chester architect John Douglas. The house is constructed in brown brick; it is symmetrical with three storeys in five bays. Douglas' additions include the rear extension, which has diapering in blue bricks and is joined to the original part of the house by a timber-framed link. Douglas also altered the end gables, adding blue-brick diapering and terracotta copings.

== See also ==
- Listed buildings in Poulton, Cheshire
- List of houses and associated buildings by John Douglas
