= Iron Bridge Lodge, Aldford =

Iron Bridge Lodge
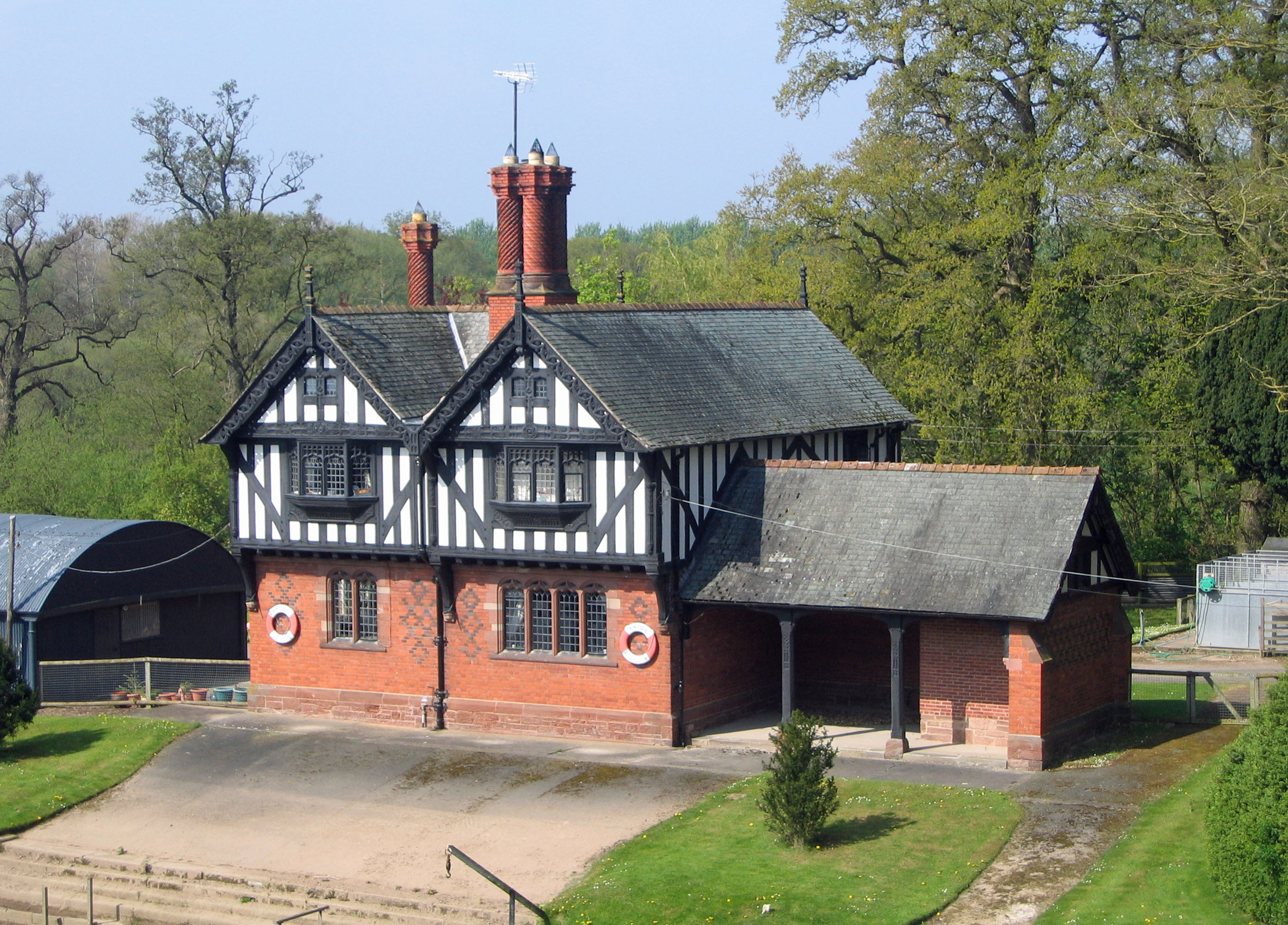
- Iron Bridge Lodge

- Location in Cheshire
- 53.1347°N 2.8717°W
- Location: Aldford Approach; Eaton Hall, Cheshire, England
- OS grid reference: SJ 418 601

History
- Built: 1894
- Built for: 1st Duke of Westminster

Site notes
- Architect: Douglas & Fordham

Listed Building – Grade II
- Designated: 2 November 1983
- Reference no.: 1138387

Iron Bridge Lodge is a house on the Aldford Approach to Eaton Hall, Cheshire, England. It is sited on the banks of the River Dee and is close to Aldford Iron Bridge. The house is recorded in the National Heritage List for England as a designated Grade II listed building.

== History ==
The lodge was built for The 1st Duke of Westminster in 1894–95 and was designed by the Chester firm of architects Douglas and Fordham.

== Architecture ==
Iron Bridge Lodge is built in two storeys with attics and a single-storey extension, the lower storey being in red brick and the upper storey jettied and timber-framed. The main part of the house has two bays facing the river. In the lower storey, the left bay has a two-light mullioned window and in the right bay is a similar window with four lights. In the upper storey each bay has a four-light oriel window with a small two-light window in the attics above. There are two red-brick chimneys, a larger one in the centre and a smaller one at the left rear, each with blue-brick diapering and spiral moulded flues.

== See also ==
- Listed buildings in Poulton, Cheshire
- List of houses and associated buildings by John Douglas
