= The Gelli =

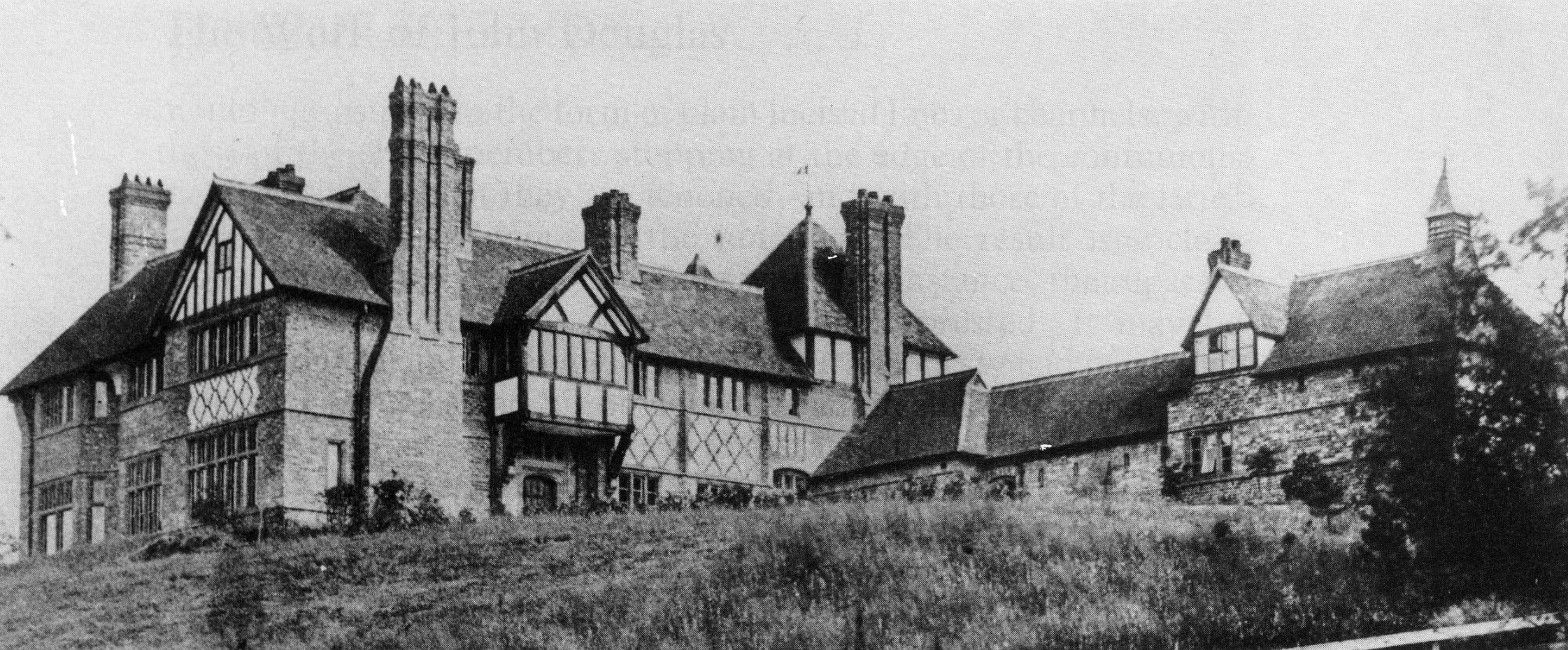
- The Gelli from the northwest about 1880
- Interactive map of The Gelli
- 52.9889°N 2.7998°W
- Location: Tallarn Green, Wrexham County Borough, Wales

History
- Built: 1877
- Built for: Hons. Georgina and Henrietta Kenyon

Site notes
- Architect: John Douglas
- Architectural style: Domestic Revival

Listed Building – Grade II*
- Designated: 20 October 2005

The Gelli is a small country house situated between Tallarn Green and Tybroughton in Wrexham County Borough, Wales. It is a Grade II* listed building standing in a prominent position on the edge of a hill.

== History ==
The Gelli was designed by the Chester architect John Douglas and built in 1877 for the Honourables Georgina and Henrietta Kenyon, who were the daughters of the 3rd Baron Kenyon of Gredlington.

== Architecture ==
The house is built in three ranges (wings), each at right angles to each, other forming a zigzag or "domino" shape. It is constructed mainly in brick, with red sandstone and terracotta dressings, and with some timber framing in the upper storey. The roofs are tiled and the chimney stacks are brick.

The west-facing range entrance range has 2½ storeys with a tower at its south end. The tower has a pyramidal roof with a weather vane incorporating the letter "K". The upper storey is jettied and timber-framed and its tie beam includes a painted panel inscribed "G and H K 1877". The northeast range projects behind this and also has a turret with louvred openings for a pigeon loft. The third range projects forward at the south end; it is in one storey, and comprises the coach house, stables and accommodation for the groom.

Internally the fittings and details are described as being "typically Douglas", although they are in pine rather than in his usual oak. The principal feature is the stair hall and staircase. The latter has balusters and newels and it leads by a quarter-turn to an arcaded landing.

== Critique ==
In its listing, it is described as "a very well preserved small country house in the Domestic Revival style characteristic of John Douglas, combining originality of planning and a rich vocabulary of detail in a striking picturesque composition.

== See also ==
- List of houses and associated buildings by John Douglas
