= Cornist Hall =

House in Flintshire, Wales

Coordinates: 53.2415°N 3.1638°W

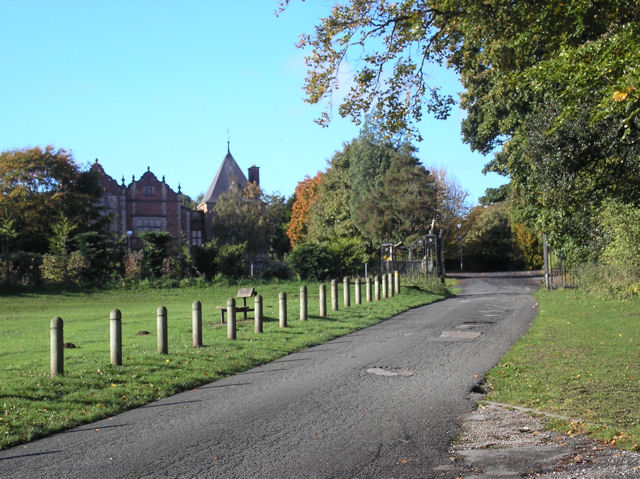
Cornist Hall

Cornist Hall is a large house 1 mile (1.6 km) west-southwest of the town of Flint, Flintshire, Wales. It was the birthplace in 1746 of Thomas Totty, an admiral who served under Lord Nelson. In about 1884 the industrialist Richard Muspratt commissioned the Chester architect John Douglas to re-model the house, but Muspratt died before this could be executed. It was later owned by members of the Summers family, who ran the ironworks business of John Summers and Sons in Shotton and who made extensive alterations to the house. In 1953 the ownership of the house passed to the Local Authority who modified the interior for catering purposes. The Napier family took it over in 1987 and developed it as a wedding and dining venue. The Hall was eventually converted into the local golf club's club-house. Despite the change of hands, Cornist Hall continued to cater for weddings up until its closure in 2012. Since its closure, Flint's local community have petitioned to save the building, in the hope that it will gain listed status and fall under the ownership of the local populace. In the past few years, since the closure of Cornist Hall, a number of local people have complained about the increase in anti-social behaviour and vandalism, suggesting that the former mansion is a magnet for such activities. The house is built in brick and stone in Jacobethan style.

== See also ==
- List of houses and associated buildings by John Douglas
