= Listed buildings in Lea Newbold =

Lea Newbold is a former civil parish, now in the parish of Aldford and Saighton, in Cheshire West and Chester, England. It contains three buildings that are recorded in the National Heritage List for England as designated listed buildings, all of which are at Grade II. This grade is the lowest of the three gradings given to listed buildings and is applied to "buildings of national importance and special interest". The parish is entirely rural, and the listed buildings consist of two farmhouses and a farm building.

Name and location	Photograph	Date	Notes
Farm building, Newbold; 53.13415°N 2.83313°W	—	Late 16th century	A timber-framed barn with brick nogging on a stone plinth. It has a Welsh slate roof. The barn has a rectangular plan, it is in a single storey, and a three-bay north front. On the south side is a 19th-century brick extension.
Leahall Farmhouse; 53.1239°N 2.8519°W		1873	A farmhouse designed by John Douglas for the 1st Duke of Westminster. It is in two storeys, the lower storey being in brick, and the upper storey timber-framed. The roof is tiled. The house is in three bays, the central bay containing a two-storey gabled porch. The windows are mullioned, those in the upper storey in gabled half-dormers with bargeboards and finials.
Lea Newbold Farmhouse; 53.1303°N 2.8361°W	—	c. 1880	The farmhouse was designed by John Douglas for the 1st Duke of Westminster. It is built in brick with a tiled roof in the style of the 17th century. The house has an irregular plan, it is in three storeys, and has a three-bay west front. Its features include ornately shaped gables, finials, casement windows, a timber-framed porch, and a staircase tower with a pyramidal roof.

== See also ==
- Listed buildings in Aldford
- Listed buildings in Churton by Aldford
- Listed buildings in Churton by Farndon
- Listed buildings in Coddington
- Listed buildings in Eaton
- Listed buildings in Eccleston
- Listed buildings in Golborne David
- Listed buildings in Handley
- Listed buildings in Huntington
- Listed buildings in Poulton
- Listed buildings in Pulford
- Listed buildings in Rowton
- Listed buildings in Saighton
- Listed buildings in Waverton
