= Listed buildings in Buerton, Cheshire West and Chester =

Buerton is a former civil parish, now in the parish of Aldford and Saighton, in Cheshire West and Chester, England. It contains two buildings that are recorded in the National Heritage List for England as designated listed buildings, both of which are at Grade II. This grade is the lowest of the three gradings given to listed buildings and is applied to "buildings of national importance and special interest". Both of the listed buildings are bridges on the Buerton Approach to Eaton Hall.

Name and location	Photograph	Date	Notes
Bridge over Aldford Brook; 53.13512°N 2.86823°W		1870s	The bridge carries the Buerton Approach to Eaton Hall over the Aldford Brook. It was built for the 1st Duke of Westminster, and Alfred Waterhouse was involved in the design. It is a sandstone bridge with a cast iron panelled parapet, and has three Tudor arches, between which are buttresses standing on rusticated cutwaters. The panels on the parapet are decorated with quatrefoils containing shields with armorial bearings.
Bridge over Chester Road; 53.13562°N 2.86551°W		1870s	The bridge carries the Buerton Approach to Eaton Hall over the B5130 Chester Road. It was built for the 1st Duke of Westminster, and Alfred Waterhouse was involved in the design. It is a sandstone bridge with a cast iron panelled parapet, and consists of a single basket arch carried on rectangular piers. The panels on the parapet are decorated with quatrefoils containing shields with armorial bearings.

== See also ==
- Listed buildings in Aldford
- Listed buildings in Eaton
- Listed buildings in Eccleston
- Listed buildings in Golborne David
- Listed buildings in Handley
- Listed buildings in Huntington
- Listed buildings in Poulton
- Listed buildings in Pulford
- Listed buildings in Saighton
