= Bruera =

Village in Cheshire, England

Coordinates: 53.136°N 2.843°W

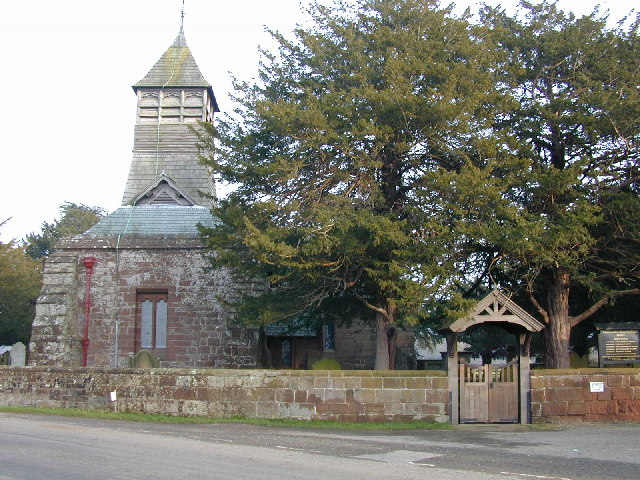
- St Mary's Church, Bruera

- Location within Cheshire
- OS grid reference: SJ435603
- Civil parish: Aldford and Saighton
- Unitary authority: Cheshire West and Chester
- Ceremonial county: Cheshire
- Region: North West
- Country: England
- Sovereign state: United Kingdom
- Post town: CHESTER
- Postcode district: CH3
- Dialling code: 01244
- Police: Cheshire
- Fire: Cheshire
- Ambulance: North West
- UK Parliament: Chester South and Eddisbury

Bruera is a village in Cheshire, England. It is located between the two villages of Saighton and Aldford. Bruera is about six miles south of Chester and belongs to the Estate of the Duke of Westminster.

== Buildings and Churches ==
St. Mary's Church is a small Church listed in the National Heritage List for England as a Grade II building.
