= Saighton Grange =

Saighton Grange Gateway
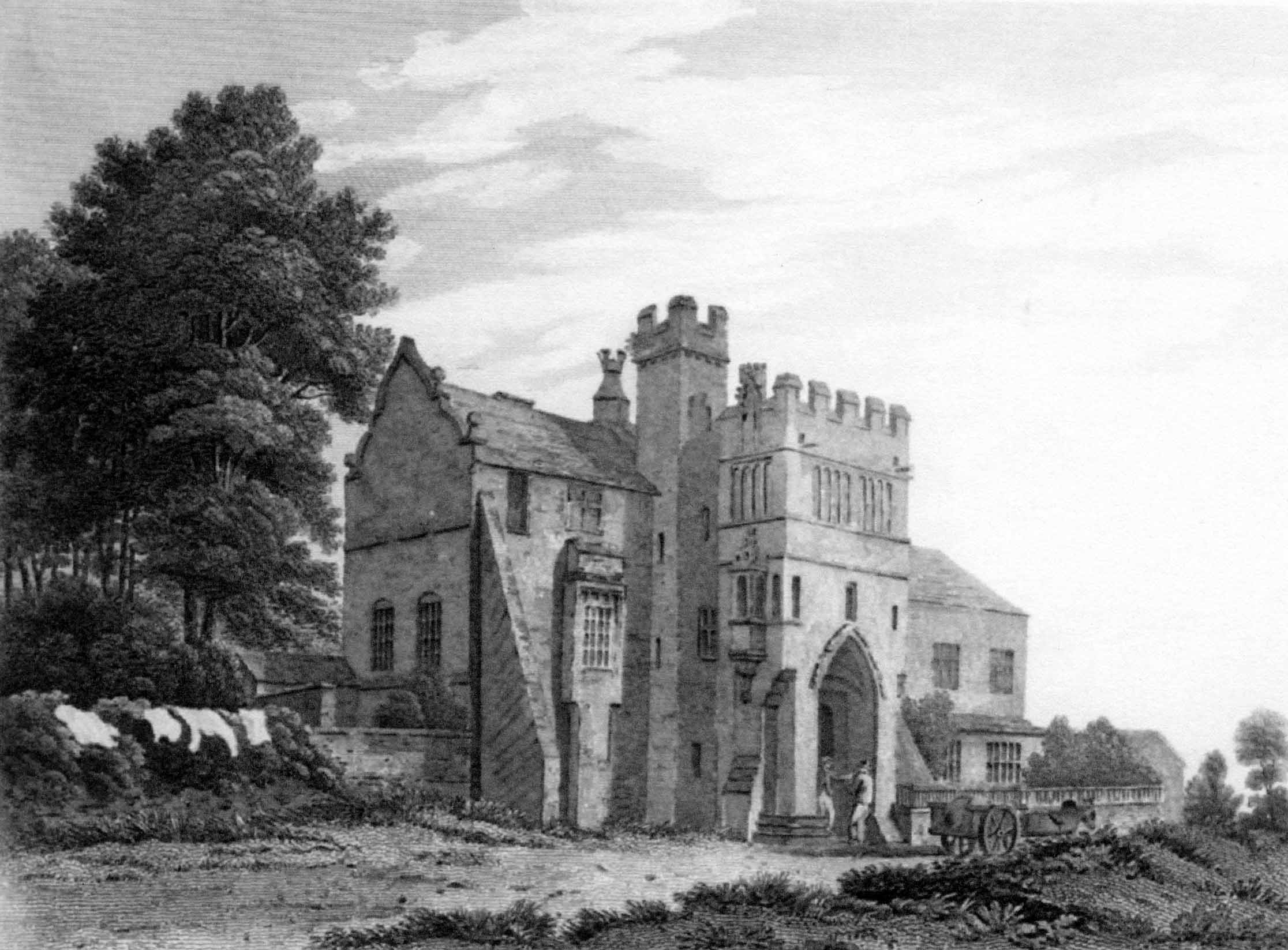
- Saighton Grange in 1817 before the medieval flanking buildings were demolished

- Location in Cheshire
- 53.1503°N 2.8342°W
- Location: Saighton, Cheshire, England

History
- Built: 1490
- Built for: Simon Ripley, Abbot of St Werburgh's

Site notes
- Architectural style: English Gothic

Listed Building – Grade I
- Designated: 1 June 1967
- Reference no.: 1138394

Saighton Grange
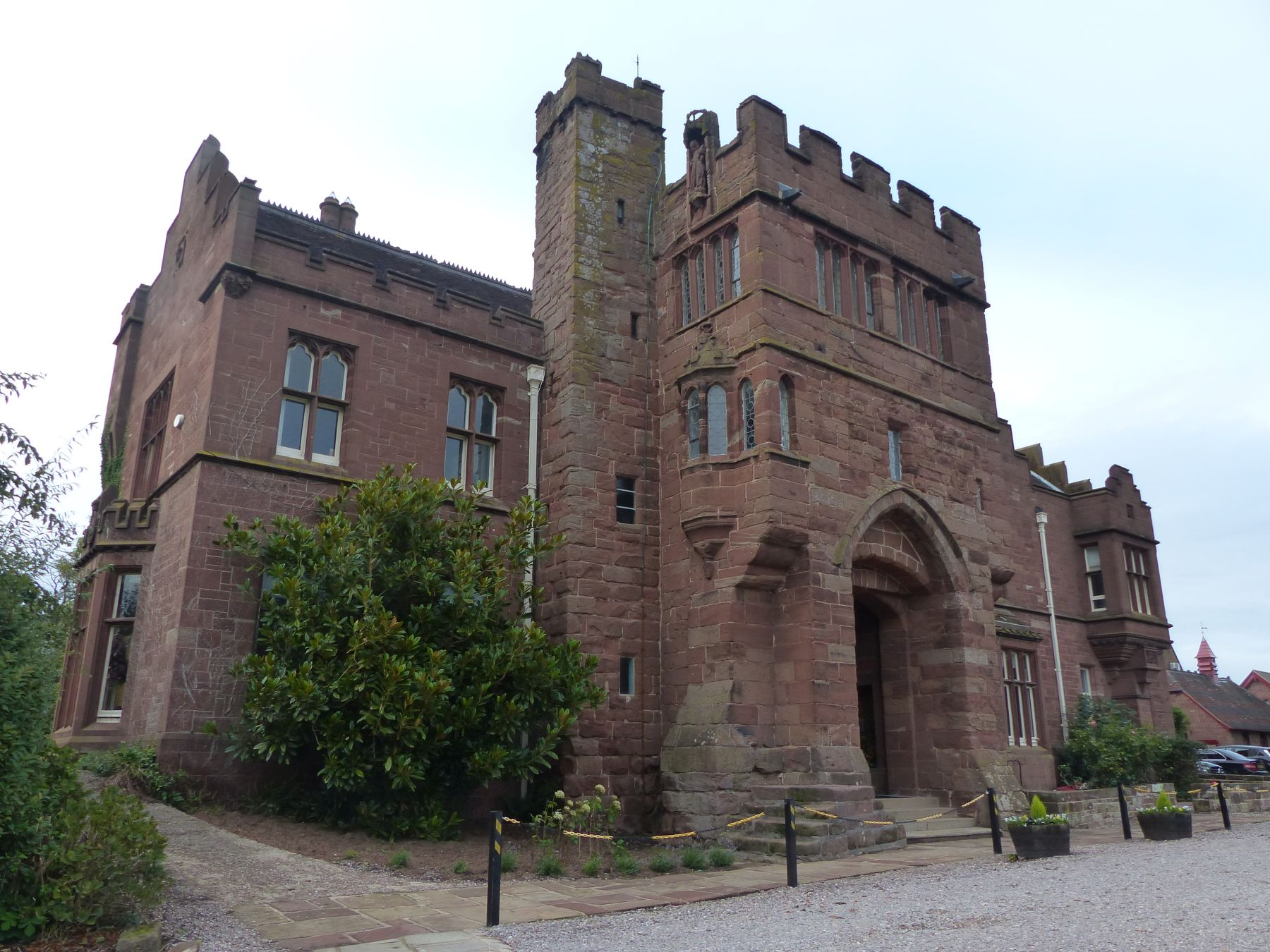
- Interactive map of Saighton Grange

History
- Built: 1861, 1870–72, 1894–96
- Built for: 2nd Marquess of Westminster, 1st Duke of Westminster

Site notes
- Architect(s): Edward Hodkinson, John Douglas
- Architectural style: Tudor

Listed Building – Grade II
- Designated: 2 November 1983
- Reference no.: 1136660

Saighton Grange Chapel
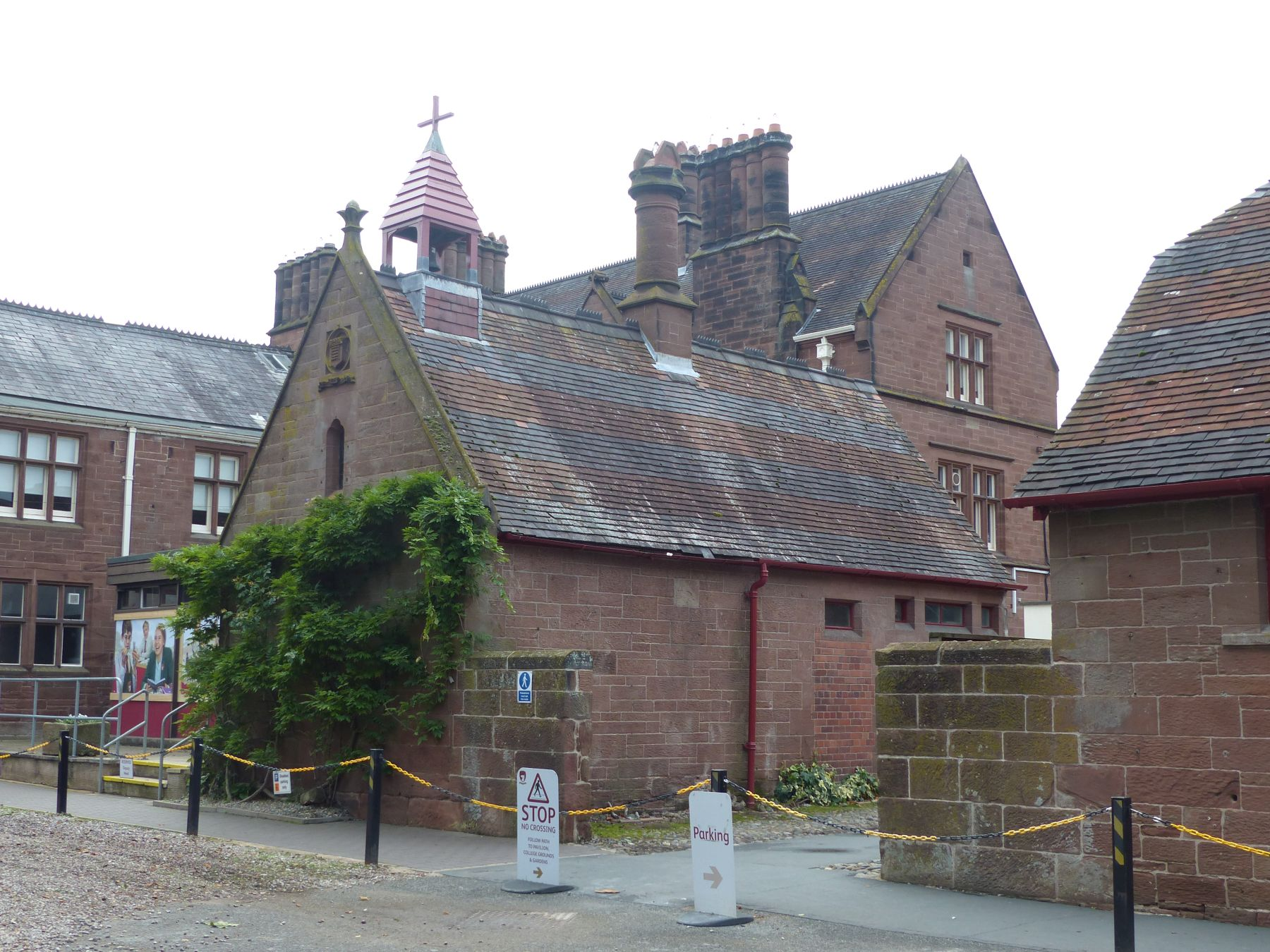
- Interactive map of Saighton Grange Chapel

History
- Built: c. 1870

Listed Building – Grade II
- Designated: 2 November 1983
- Reference no.: 1130671

Wall, Abbey Gate College
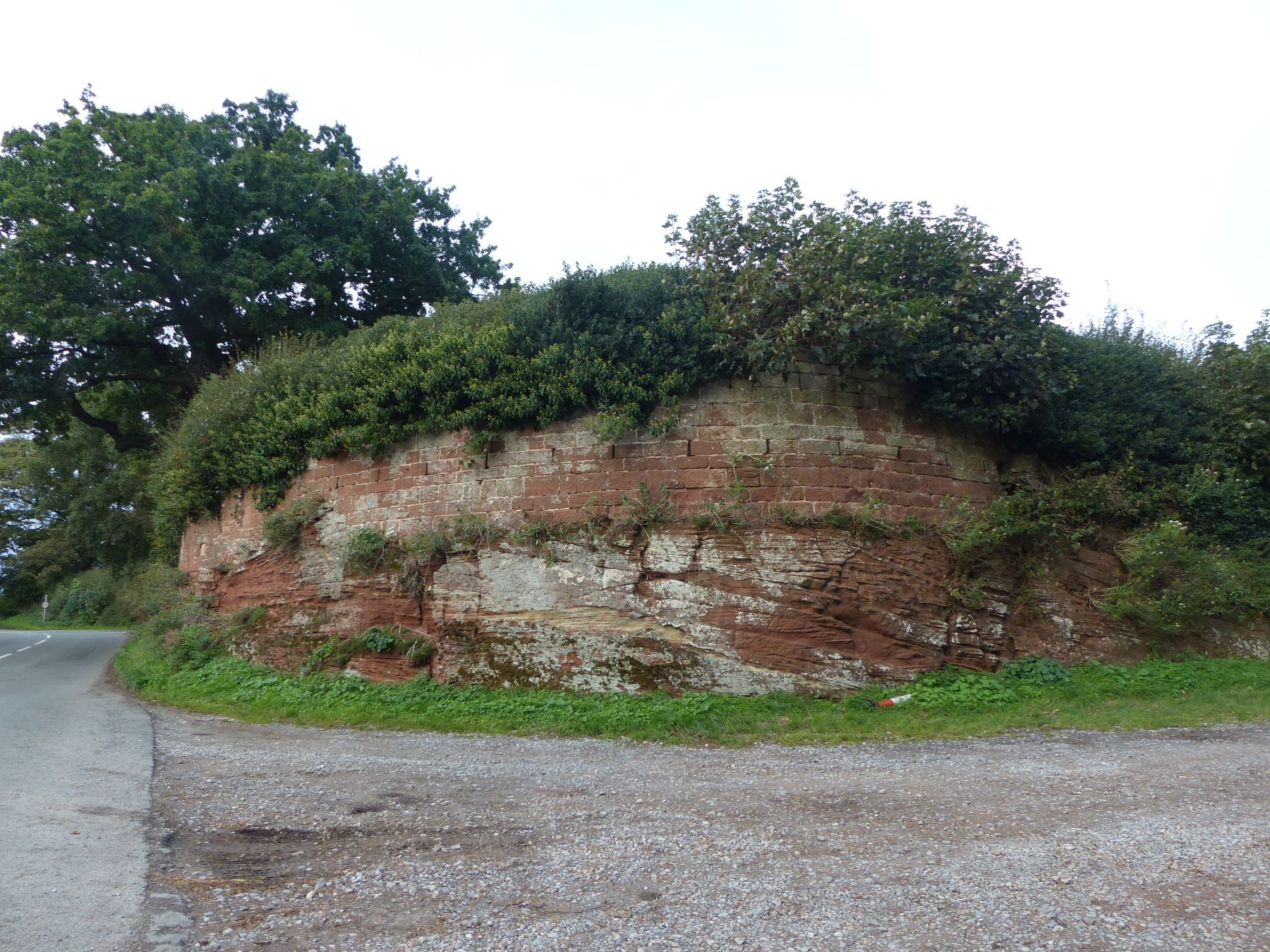
- Interactive map of Wall, Abbey Gate College

Listed Building – Grade II
- Designated: 1 June 1967
- Reference no.: 1330250

Saighton Grange originated as a monastic grange. It was later converted into a country house and, as of 2024, the building is used as a school (Abbey Gate College). The only surviving part of the monastic grange is the gatehouse, which is recorded in the National Heritage List for England as a designated Grade I listed building, and is one of only two surviving monastic manorial buildings in Cheshire, the other being Ince Manor. The rest of the building is listed at Grade II, as is its chapel.

== History ==
The manor of Saighton was held by the secular canons of St Werburgh in Chester before the Norman Conquest. In the Domesday Book of 1086 it is listed as Saltone. In 1093 it was granted to the Benedictine monks of St Werburgh's Abbey by Hugh Lupus. The site was given a licence to crenellate in 1399, and this was confirmed in 1410, but the privilege was apparently not acted upon: "Saighton was primarily an agricultural centre until it was converted to residential use in the fifteenth century". The manor house was built about 1489 for Simon Ripley, Abbot of St Werburgh's. Following the dissolution of the monasteries the manor passed through several hands and in time the house was separated from the manor. In the 1840s the house was bought by the 2nd Marquess of Westminster.

The monastic buildings, other than the gatehouse, were demolished in 1861 and were replaced by a house designed by Edward Hodkinson for the 2nd Marquess of Westminster. Alterations were made to the house in about 1870–72 and again in 1894–96 by the Chester architect John Douglas for the 1st Duke of Westminster. In the 1880s the building was occupied by Earl Grosvenor. The garden were redesigned in 1901–02 by Harry Inigo Triggs. The buildings were converted into a school in 1977 and it now forms Abbey Gate College, which is a private coeducational school for pupils aged 4–18.

== Architecture ==
=== Gatehouse ===
This dates from 1490, and was built in front of an earlier wide-arched vehicular entry. It is constructed in red sandstone and has three storeys, with string courses between the storeys. It is surmounted by a crenellated parapet. The lower 1½ storeys of the front aspect are occupied by a pointed arch, above which are three narrow windows. In the upper storey are two four-light mullioned windows. On the left side is a three-light oriel window with a four-light mullioned window above, and in the merlon above this is a niche containing a statue. On the right side is a blocked arch in the ground floor, a single-light window above it and a four-light mullioned window in the top storey. In the angle between the gateway and the newer building, on the left, is a square turret that is taller than the rest of the gatehouse.

=== House ===
The rest of the house is also built in red sandstone and it has a tiled roof. The main wing has two storeys and flanks the gatehouse, with two bays to its left and three bays to the right. It is in Tudor style with battlements and stepped gables. The right wing also has two storeys with a three-storey cross wing.

=== Chapel ===
The chapel was built in about 1870 in red sandstone with a tiled roof. It is a rectangular building with gables. On one of the gables is an open bellcote with one bell under a square spire. There are four windows containing stained glass; three of these date from the late 19th century, the other from the late 20th century.

== Grounds ==
In the grounds are part of the medieval boundary wall which is built of sandstone rubble. This stands on bedrock on the edge of a rock cutting and is thought to have been a form of light fortification. The walls are listed Grade II. The grounds consist of formal gardens, surrounded by informal parkland. The gardens are open occasionally under the National Garden Scheme.

== See also ==
- Grade I listed buildings in Cheshire West and Chester
- Grade I listed non-ecclesiastical buildings in Cheshire
- Listed buildings in Saighton
- List of houses and associated buildings by John Douglas
