= Buerton =

Buerton may refer to the following places in Cheshire, England:

- Buerton, Cheshire East, a village and civil parish in the unitary authority of Cheshire East
- Buerton, Cheshire West and Chester, a former civil parish in the area of the unitary authority of Cheshire West and Chester
