= Saighton =

Village in Cheshire, England

Coordinates: 53.15°N 2.833333°W

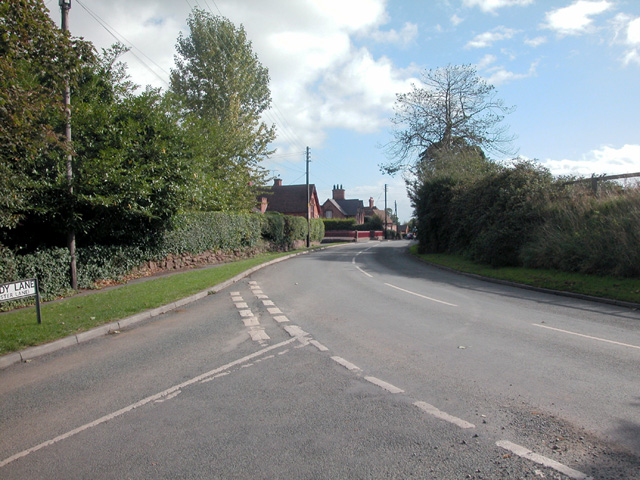
- Saighton Village

- Location within Cheshire
- OS grid reference: SJ 443 619
- Civil parish: Aldford and Saighton
- Unitary authority: Cheshire West and Chester
- Ceremonial county: Cheshire
- Region: North West
- Country: England
- Sovereign state: United Kingdom
- Post town: Chester
- Postcode district: CH3
- Police: Cheshire
- Fire: Cheshire
- Ambulance: North West
- UK Parliament: Chester South and Eddisbury

Saighton (/ˈseɪtən/;) is a village and former civil parish, now in the parish of Aldford and Saighton, in the unitary authority area of Cheshire West and Chester and the ceremonial county of Cheshire, England, a few miles south of Chester. The 2011 Census recorded a population for the parish of 202. Much of the surrounding land is owned by the Duke of Westminster.

== History ==
The village is said to take its name from the Old English of salh and tun which translates into "the settlement where willow grows". The settlement predates the Norman Conquest and is mentioned in the Domesday Book as Saltone. Most of the land and buildings in Saighton are owned by the Duke of Westminster's Eaton Estate, which has been in the ownership of the Grosvenor family since the 1440s.

Saighton is described in 1870–72 in John Marius Wilson's Imperial Gazetteer of England and Wales as having a population of 272, 59 houses and a post office. In 1881 Saighton had a total population of 350, with most men working in farming, and most women who were employed working as servants. Saighton was a township in St. Oswald's ancient parish until 1866 when it became a civil parish. The civil parish was abolished on 1 April 2015 to form "Aldford and Saighton".

Six men from Saighton who lost their lives in World War I are commemorated on the village's war memorial.

== Places of interest ==
St Mary's Church is in the small settlement of Bruera, which lies between the villages of Saighton and Aldford, in Cheshire, England. It is designated by English Heritage as a Grade II* listed building. The church contains Norman elements, but it has been subjected to alterations and modifications, particularly in 1896. Its benefice is combined with other churches St Peter, Waverton, and St John the Baptist, Aldford.

Saighton Camp was a military installation used by the British Army. It was used as a training centre for the Royal Army Medical Corps before its closure in around 1999. The site was redeveloped as housing in the 2010s. The streets on the new estate have names with military significance, such as Wellesley, Alanbrooke, Green Howards and Dragoon.

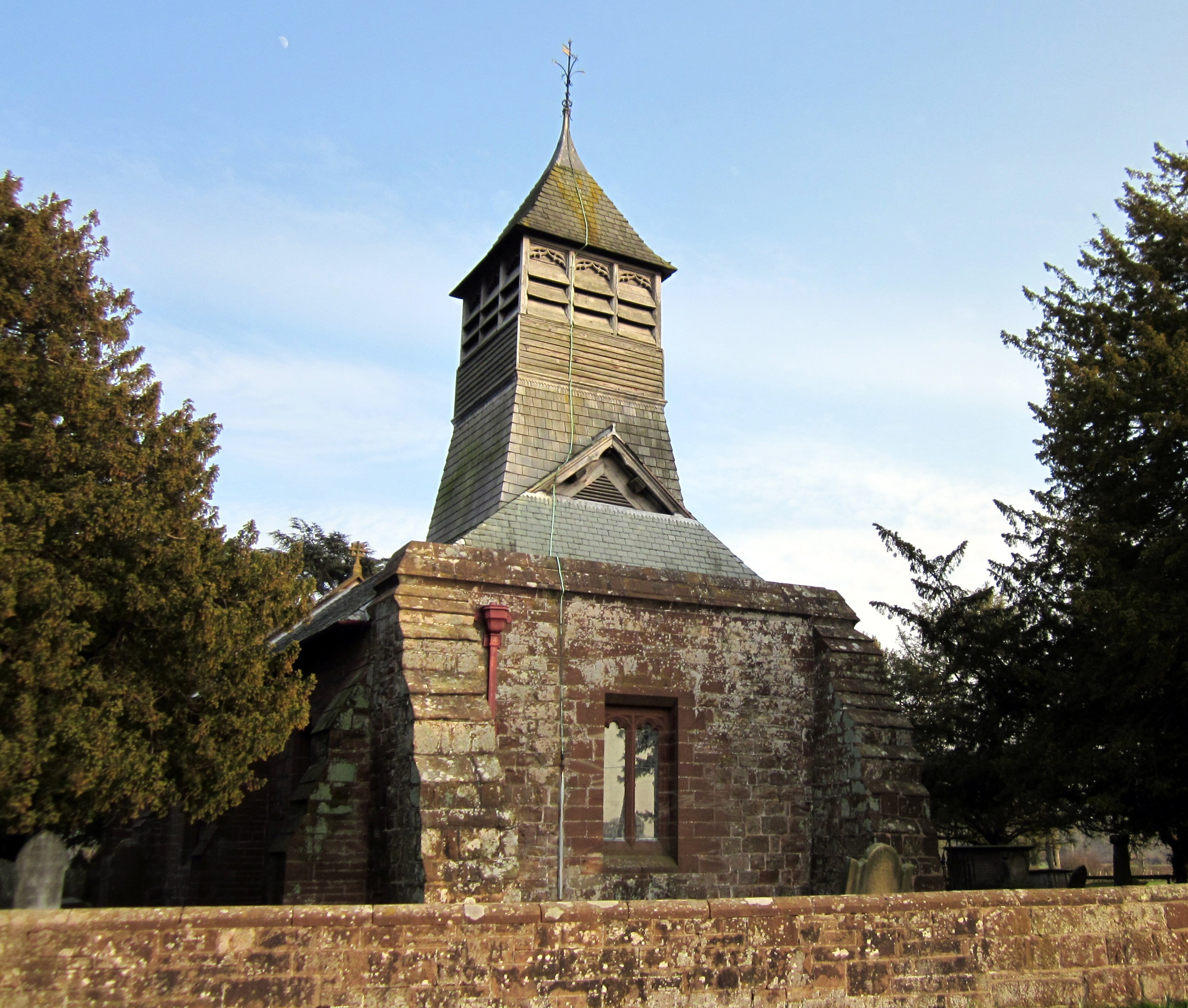
St Mary's Church, Bruera

The village has a voluntary aided Church of England primary school, with older children travelling to nearby Christleton or Malpas for state secondary education. Abbey Gate College is an independent day school located on the outskirts of Saighton in the grounds of Saighton Grange. The village has a village hall which is used for local events. A number of former farm buildings in Saighton have been converted for business use.

== See also ==
- Listed buildings in Saighton
- Saighton Grange
- Saighton Lane Farm
