= Saighton Lane Farm =

Farm in Cheshire, England

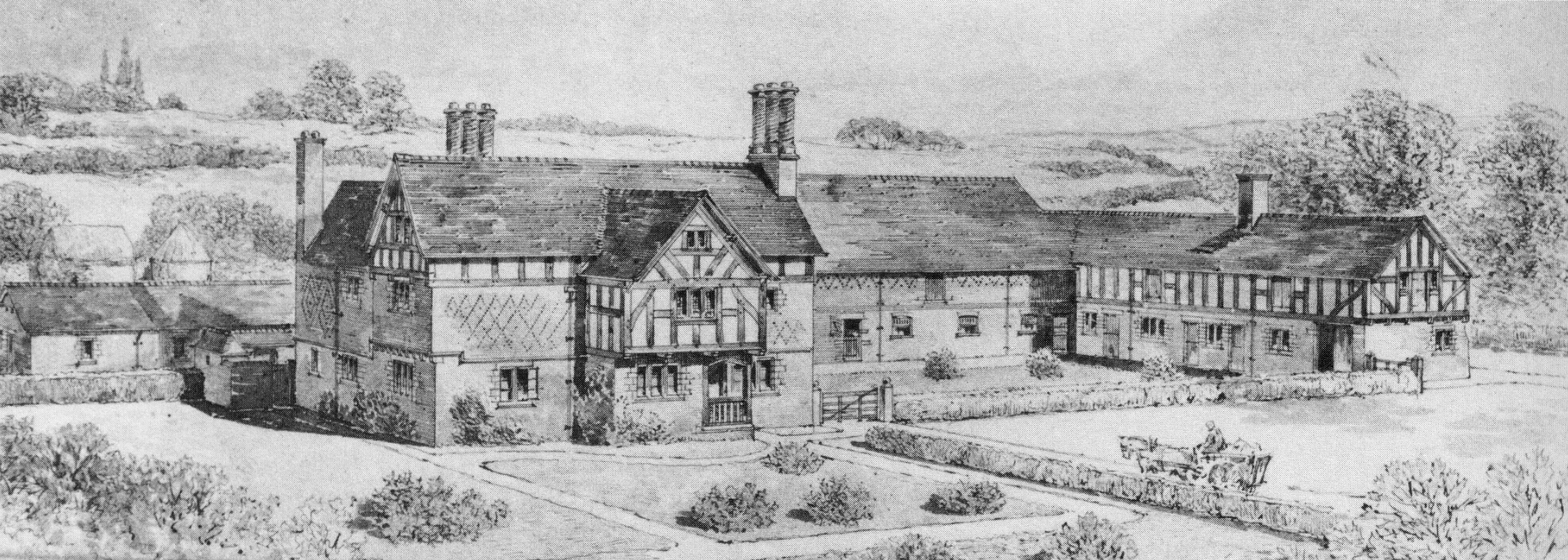
- Drawing of the farm dated 1888

- Location in Cheshire
- 53.1615°N 2.8280°W
- Location: Saighton Lane, Saighton, Cheshire, England
- OS grid reference: SJ 447 630

History
- Built: 1888–89
- Built for: 1st Duke of Westminster

Site notes
- Architect: Douglas and Fordham

Listed Building – Grade II
- Designated: 2 November 1983
- Reference no.: 1330213, 1130676

Saighton Lane Farm is a farm, originating as a model farm, in Saighton Lane, 0.5 miles (1 km) to the north-northeast of the village of Saighton, Cheshire, England. The farmhouse and the farm buildings are recorded separately in the National Heritage List for England as designated Grade II listed buildings.

== History ==
The farm was built in 1888–89 as a model farm for the 1st Duke of Westminster on his Eaton Hall estate and designed by the Chester firm of architects Douglas and Fordham.

== Architecture ==
The farmhouse is built in brown brick with sandstone dressings and diapering in blue brick and some timber framing. It has a red tile roof. The plan consists of a main wing facing Saighton Lane and two separate wings at the rear, forming a U-shape. The building has two storeys plus attics. The main front has three bays with timber framing in its upper storey and attic. The central bay projects forward towards the lane and contains a porch. In its lower storey is a three-light mullioned casement window on the left and the porch, which is recessed and framed, is on the right. The upper storey contains a three-light window and in the gable above it is a two-light window. Around these windows is timber-framed panelling. The frames over the porch contain the inscriptions "The profit of the earth is for all; the King himself is served by the field", and "Every house is builded by some man, but he that built all things is God", the latter being a text taken from the Epistle to the Hebrews. The lateral bays each have a mullioned window in the ground floor. The return to the left of the main front has a gable containing a window and timber-framed panelling. There are three brick chimney stacks. One rises from the right return and has a plinth and three flues with twisted brickwork; another rises from the rear of the main wing and is similar, with four flues. The third chimney stack at the rear of the left wing is plain.

Together with the farmhouse, the farm buildings form three sides of a quadrangle, open towards the lane. There are two two-storey wings, one opposite the farmhouse, the other at the rear, and a smaller single-storey wing behind the farmhouse. The upper storey of the wing opposite the house has timber framing in the upper storey; otherwise the buildings are in brown brick with blue brick diapering. In the gable at the end of the wing opposite the farmhouse facing the lane is a two-light mullioned window surrounded by panelling. Douglas submitted his design for this building and for Wrexham Road Farm at the Royal Academy in 1888. The authors of the Buildings of England series describe this model farm as "a particularly nice one".

== See also ==
- Listed buildings in Saighton
- List of non-ecclesiastical and non-residential works by John Douglas
