= St Mary's Church, Bruera =

Coordinates: 53.1391°N 2.8420°W

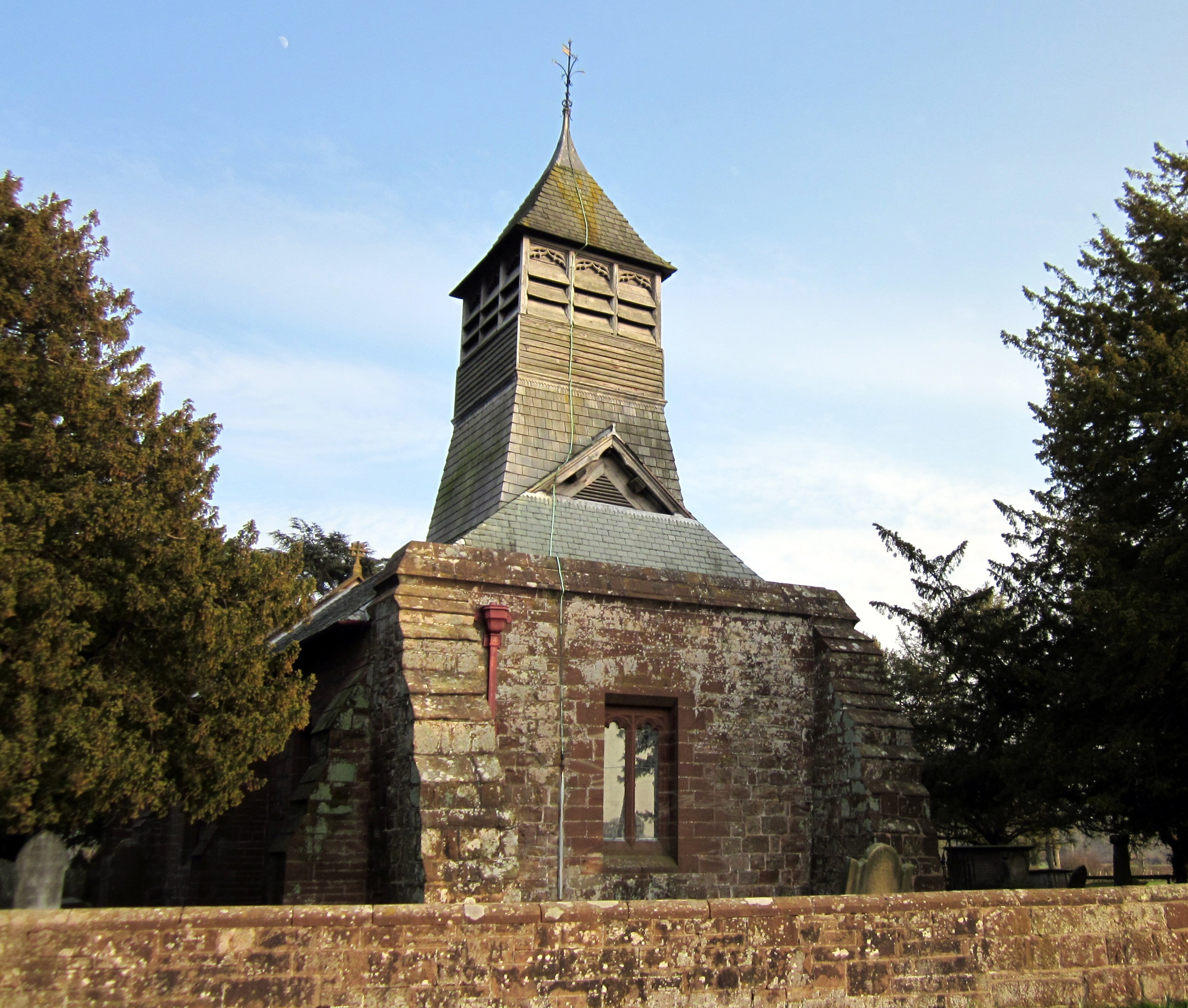
- St Mary's Church, Bruera

- Location in Cheshire
- OS grid reference: SJ 437 605
- Location: Bruera, Cheshire
- Country: England
- Denomination: Anglican

Architecture
- Heritage designation: Grade II*
- Designated: 1 August 1967
- Architect: W. M. Boden
- Architectural type: Church
- Style: Norman, Gothic
- Completed: 1896

Specifications
- Materials: Red sandstone, Slate roof

Administration
- Province: York
- Diocese: Chester
- Archdeaconry: Chester
- Deanery: Malpas
- Parish: Bruera

Clergy
- Rector: Revd Julian Thomas Proctor Beauchamp

St Mary's Church is in the small settlement of Bruera, which lies between the villages of Saighton and Aldford, in Cheshire, England. It is recorded in the National Heritage List for England as a designated Grade II* listed building. The church contains Norman elements, but it has been subjected to alterations and modifications, particularly in 1896. It is an active Anglican parish church in the diocese of Chester, the archdeaconry of Chester and the deanery of Malpas. Its benefice is combined with those of St Peter, Waverton, and St John the Baptist, Aldford.

== History ==
The settlement of Bruera is not recorded in the Domesday Book and the first mention of the church is in the Chartulary of St Werburgh's Abbey, Chester dating from around 1150. It was then a chapel in the parish of St Oswald's, Chester. Richards states that the church was in existence in Saxon times but this is disputed. The fabric of the present church dates from the Norman period and there have been a number of additions and restorations since. The Norman south doorway was rebuilt in the 14th century. Also in the 14th century and later windows were modified and in the 15th century a south chapel was added. The east window is Decorated in style and the south chapel is Perpendicular. A major restoration was carried out in 1896 by W. M. Boden at expense of the 1st Duke of Westminster involving the south porch and vestry, and a belfry was added.

== Architecture ==
=== Exterior ===
The church is built in red sandstone with a slate roof. At the west end is an oak-framed, louvred belfry with a low square shingled spire. The plan consists of a nave without aisles and a chancel. To the south are a porch, a chapel and a vestry. The chancel arch is basically Norman, but there have been later modifications. The south doorway contains Norman masonry, and includes ten voussoirs, four of which have carvings.

=== Interior ===
The altar table and chancel gates date from the 18th century while the sanctuary chairs are Jacobean. On the south wall are the arms of Charles II. The font consists of a stone baluster with a hollowed trough, dating probably from the 17th century. The stained glass in the north window dated 1897 is in the Arts and Crafts style. The chapel contains wall memorials to Sir Robert Cunliffe, who died in 1778, and to Sir Ellis Cunliffe, who died in 1767, both with putti, by Joseph Nollekens. The two-manual organ was built in 1869 by H. Moulding and Co. The parish registers date from 1657.

== External features ==
In the churchyard are some ancient yew trees and the remains of a stone cross which has been converted into a sundial. Its shaft is dated 1693 and the head 1736. The sundial is a scheduled ancient monument. The churchyard also contains war graves of a soldier and an airman of World War II.

== See also ==
- Grade II* listed buildings in Cheshire West and Chester
- Norman architecture in Cheshire
- Listed buildings in Saighton
