= Ince, Cheshire =

Coordinates: 53.282°N 2.826°W

Ince
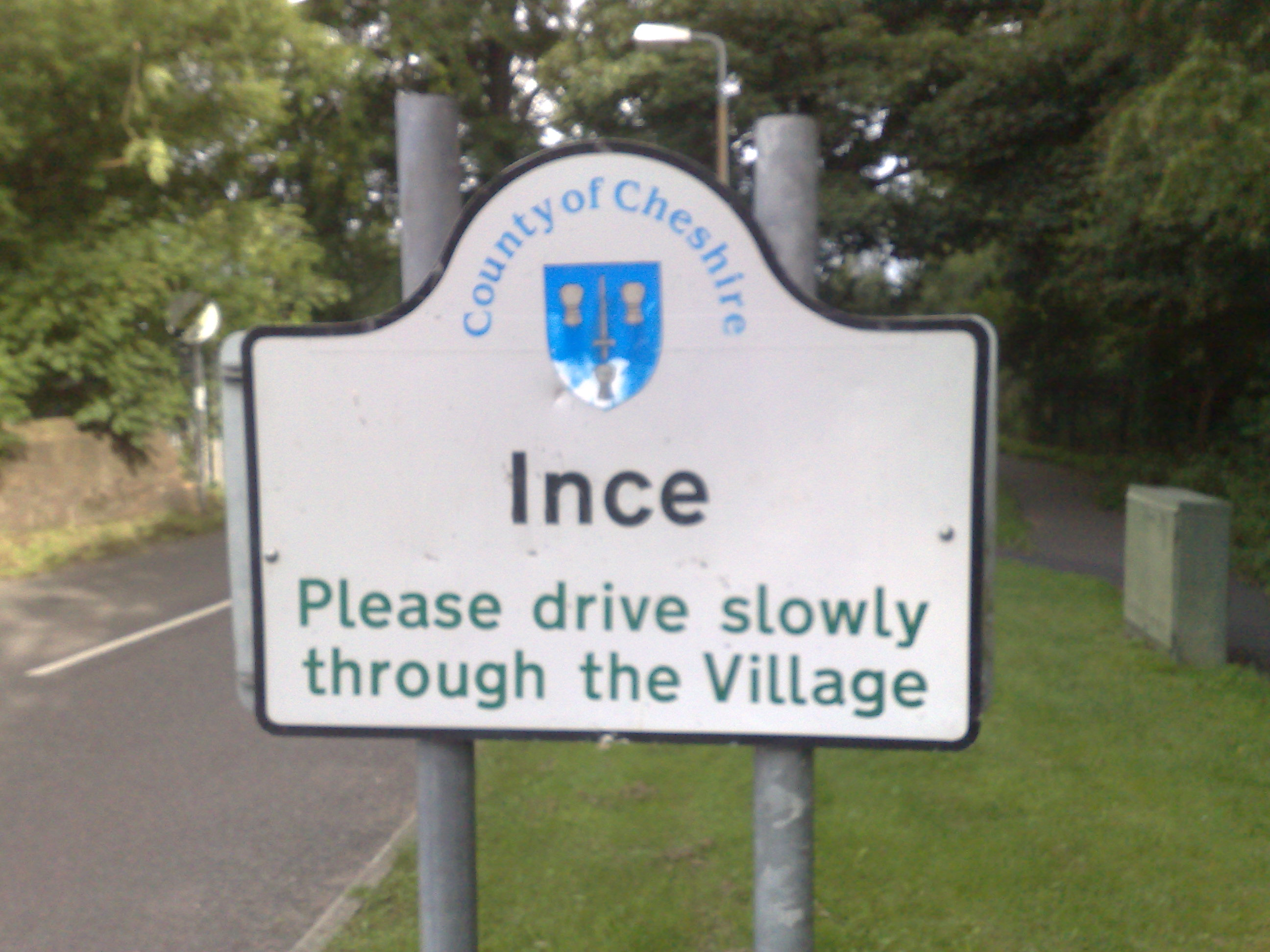
- The village boundary sign on Station Road

- Location within Cheshire
- Population: 203 (2011 census)
- OS grid reference: SJ449763
- Civil parish: Ince
- Unitary authority: Cheshire West and Chester
- Ceremonial county: Cheshire
- Region: North West
- Country: England
- Sovereign state: United Kingdom
- Post town: CHESTER
- Postcode district: CH2
- Dialling code: 01928
- Police: Cheshire
- Fire: Cheshire
- Ambulance: North West
- UK Parliament: Runcorn and Helsby

Ince is a village and civil parish in the unitary authority of Cheshire West and Chester and the ceremonial county of Cheshire, England. It is situated immediately to the east of the Stanlow Oil Refinery. It shares Ince & Elton railway station with the village of Elton, which it runs into.

According to the 2001 census it was recorded as having a population of 209. By the 2011 census this had marginally reduced to 203.

Ince Park is being developed near the village.

== History ==
The name Ince, first recorded in the Domesday Book as Inise, is from the Primitive Welsh ïnïs, meaning "island". The name refers to the village's position on a low ridge in the marshlands around the rivers Gowy and Mersey.

The Welsh poet Ieuan Glan Geirionydd was a curate at Ince during the later part of his life.

Ince was a township split between the ancient parishes of both Ince and Stoak, within the Eddisbury Hundred. It existed as a civil parish between 1866 and 1950, when it was absorbed into Ellesmere Port civil parish. The population stood at 443 in 1801, 422 in 1851 and 290 in 1901. The present civil parish was separated from Ellesmere Port in 1987, with smaller boundaries.

== Landmarks ==
The remains of Ince Manor, one of the earliest recorded properties of St Werburgh's Abbey (now Chester Cathedral), were given Grade I listed status in 1963.

== Governance ==
From 1983 to 2024, Ince formed part of the Ellesmere Port and Neston parliamentary constituency. Following the 2023 review of Westminster constituencies, it became part of the Runcorn and Helsby constituency.

The unitary authority of Cheshire West and Chester replaced Chester City Council and Cheshire County Council on 1 April 2009. Ince is within the electoral ward of Gowy Rural.

Ince is represented by its own parish council.

== Transport ==
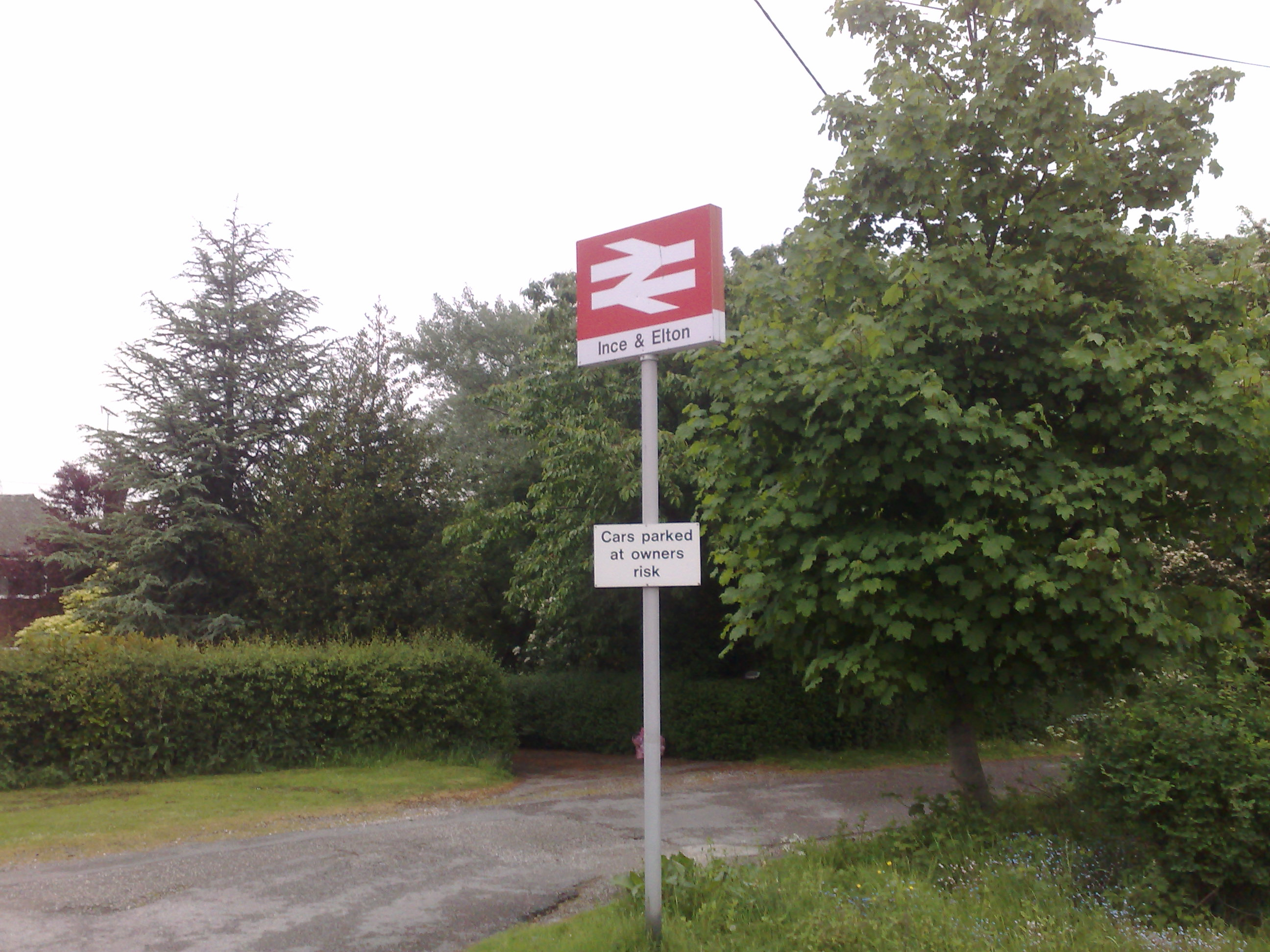
Ince & Elton railway station, serving both Ince and Elton villages

Ince & Elton railway station serves both Ince and Elton villages, but it is just within the Elton boundary. There are infrequent Monday to Saturday services to Ellesmere Port, Stanlow & Thornton, Helsby, Liverpool Lime Street, and Warrington Bank Quay. It was the worst performing English station for cancellations in the four weeks to 1 February 2025, according to data from the Office of Rail and Road (ORR), with 22.8% of trains cancelled. The nearest station with better services and facilities is either Ellesmere Port or Helsby.

The X2 bus visits Ince hourly in each direction and operates from Chester bus station with a destination of Runcorn. The service is operated by Stagecoach Merseyside & South Lancashire. Ince also has a few morning and evening journeys on service DB8 to Chester Business Park.

Public transport in Ince is supported by the North Cheshire Rail User Group. It campaigns for better rail services and improved public transport interchange.

== Economy and industry ==
Landowners The Peel Group are developing a 54 hectares (130 acres) industrial site on a former water meadow at Ince Park. The Protos "energy and resource hub" houses a biomass power station, a timber recycling plant and designated "nature areas". The construction of a facility to recover energy from non-recyclable waste began in 2020.

== See also ==
- Listed buildings in Ince
- St James' Church, Ince
- Ince Power Station
