= St James' Church, Ince =

Coordinates: 53.2813°N 2.8266°W

- St James the Great, Ince
- St James' Church, Ince, from the south in 2026

- Location in Cheshire
- OS grid reference: SJ 450 764
- Location: Ince, Cheshire
- Country: England
- Denomination: Anglican
- Website: Parish website

History
- Status: Parish church

Architecture
- Functional status: Active
- Heritage designation: Grade II*
- Designated: 26 September 1963
- Architect(s): Simon Ripley; Edward Hodkinson
- Architectural type: Church
- Style: Gothic, Gothic Revival
- Completed: 1854

Specifications
- Length: 101 ft (31 m)
- Height: Tower - 51 feet
- Materials: Red sandstone Grey slate roofs

Administration
- Province: York
- Diocese: Chester
- Archdeaconry: Chester
- Deanery: Frodsham
- Parish: Thornton-le-Moors with Ince and Elton

Clergy
- Vicar: Revd John Hellewell

St James' Church is in the village of Ince, Cheshire, England. The church is recorded in the National Heritage List for England as a designated Grade II* listed building. It is an active Anglican parish church in the diocese of Chester, the archdeaconry of Chester and the deanery of Frodsham. Its benefice is united with that of St Mary, Thornton-le-Moors.

== History ==
A Norman chapel once stood on this site. The present church was built in the medieval period but only the tower and part of the chancel remain from this date. The chancel is in 14th-century Decorated style and possesses a three-light Decorated window in its east wall. The chancel has a 17th-century oak arch-braced collar roof. The Perpendicular tower by Simon Ripley dates from around 1485–93. The chancel roof, though restored, dates from 1671. The nave, aisle and porch were rebuilt in 1854 in Perpendicular style by Edward Hodkinson, and the tower was raised by two courses.

== Architecture ==
=== Exterior ===
The church is built in red sandstone with a grey slate roof. Its plan consists of a west tower, a five-bay nave with a north aisle, and a chancel with a lower roof.

=== Interior ===
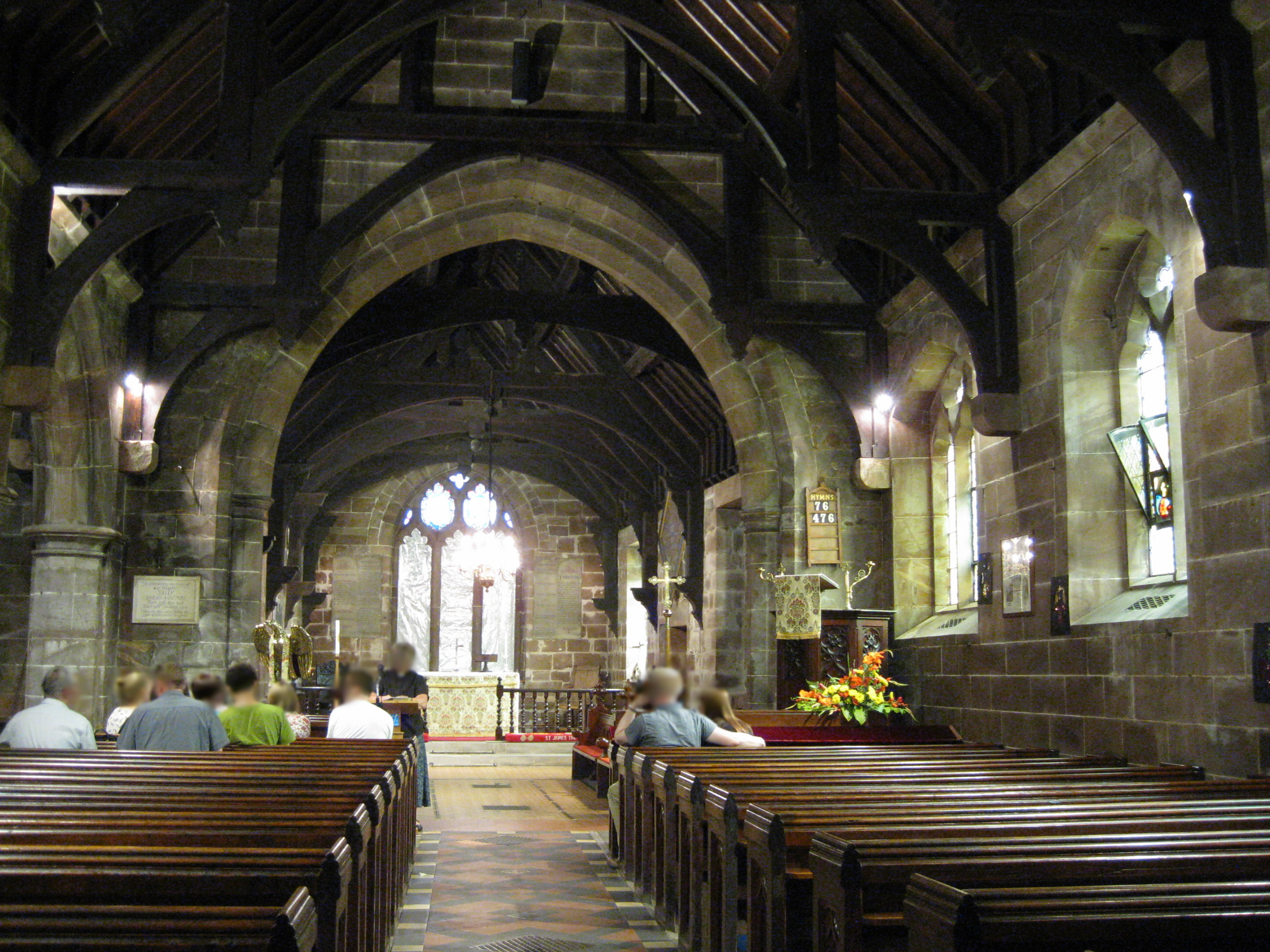
Interior

The deeply carved altar table is Jacobean, and the altar rails date from the late 17th century. Also in the chancel is a sanctuary chair of 1634 and a two-tier candelabrum dated 1724. The royal coat of arms of Queen Anne are in the nave. The communion rail with twisted balusters dates from the late 17th century. In the chancel are two stained glass windows by Kempe. There is a ring of three bells, two of which are dated 1622 and 1636. The parish registers begin in 1687 and the churchwardens' accounts in 1749.

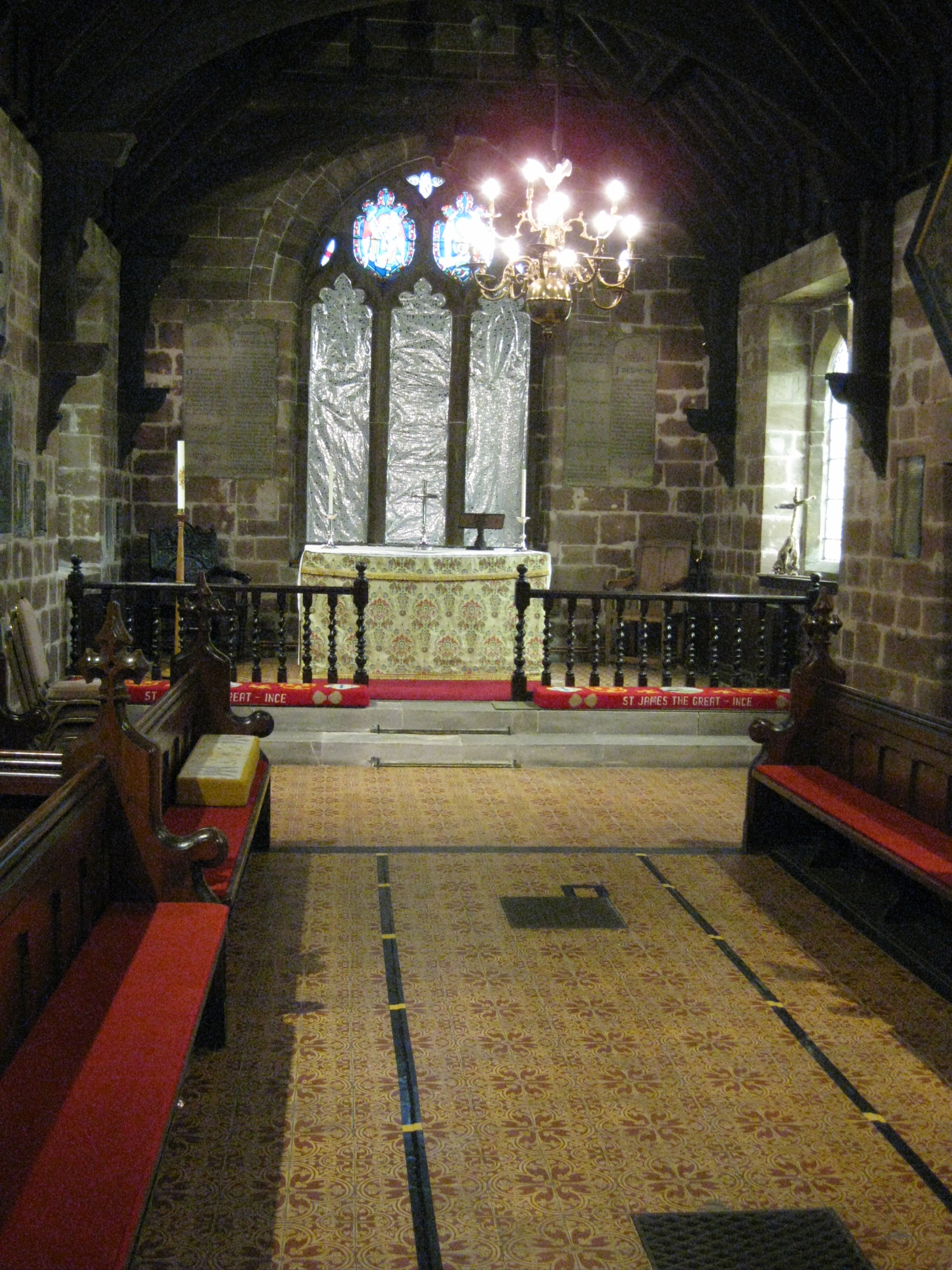
Altar

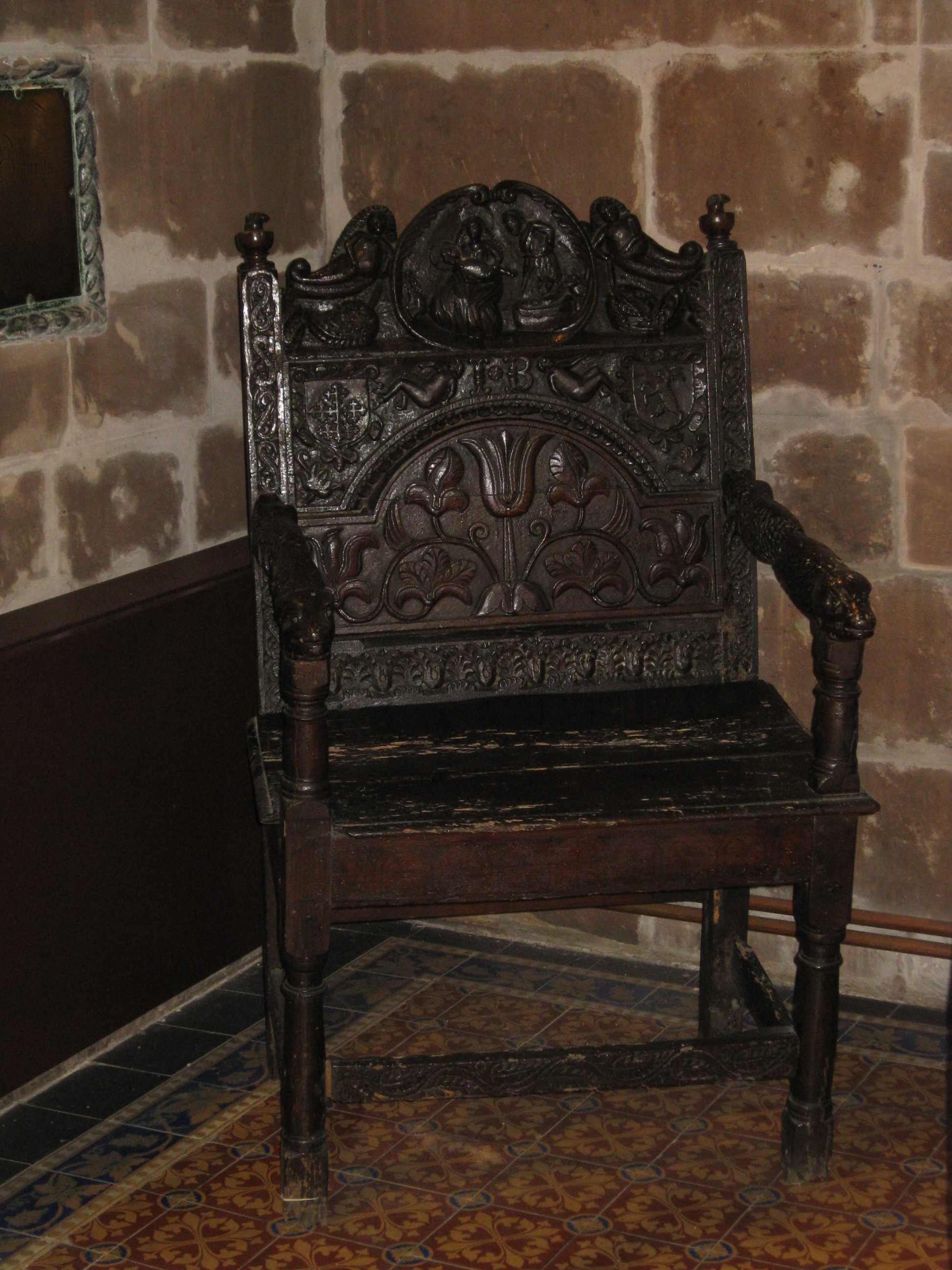
Sanctuary chair

== External features ==
The sandstone 19th-century churchyard wall is a Grade II listed building. In the churchyard, north west of the tower, is the war grave of a Royal Navy sailor of World War II.

== See also ==
- Grade II* listed buildings in Cheshire West and Chester
- Listed buildings in Ince
