= Huntington, Cheshire =

Village in Cheshire, England

Coordinates: 53.173°N 2.863°W

Huntington
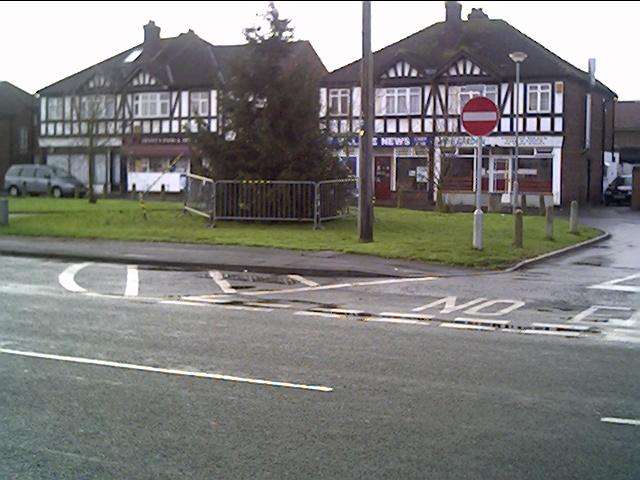
- Village centre

- Location within Cheshire
- Population: 2,115 (2011 census)
- OS grid reference: SJ423644
- Civil parish: Huntington
- Unitary authority: Cheshire West and Chester
- Ceremonial county: Cheshire
- Region: North West
- Country: England
- Sovereign state: United Kingdom
- Post town: CHESTER
- Postcode district: CH3
- Dialling code: 01244
- Police: Cheshire
- Fire: Cheshire
- Ambulance: North West
- UK Parliament: City of Chester

Huntington is a village and civil parish on the southern outskirts of Chester, in the unitary authority of Cheshire West and Chester and the ceremonial county of Cheshire, England.

In the 2001 census the population of the entire civil parish was 1,961, increasing to 2,115 by the 2011 census.

== History ==
The name Huntington is derived from the Old English words hunting/hunta (hunting/hunter) and dūn (a hill), therefore meaning 'hunter's hill' or possibly 'hunting hill'.

It is known to have existed at the time of William the Conqueror's Domesday Book of 1086 as Hunditone. The settlement consisted of eight households (two villagers, two smallholders and four slaves) on land held by St. Werburgh's Abbey.

The population according to the census of 1801 was 111, becoming 129 in 1851, 121 in 1901 and 2,614 in 1951.

== Community ==
The main road through the village, Chester Road (B5130), links Chester, which is less than a mile to the north, with the villages of Farndon and Aldford to the south. The A55 (North Wales Expressway) passes through the south of the village, but is not directly accessible at Huntington.

The village includes a few shops, a post office, Huntington Primary School, and St Luke's Church of England Church. Recreational open spaces include a village green, Jubilee Field and the 30 acres (120,000 m^{2}) of wetland, woodland and meadows of Caldy Nature Park.

Saighton Camp is an old British Army base that, despite the name, is within Huntington's boundaries. It has been redeveloped with the construction of 1200 new homes. Controversially the developers reneged on proposals to build a primary school on the site and succeeded in getting planning permission for additional housing instead. In response, to meet growing demand for school places Cheshire West and Chester council built a new school on green belt land adjacent to the camp as a replacement for the existing school, which was too small for the increased population. The new school opened in November 2018.

During the early years of the redevelopment of the camp the Chester Driving Standards Agency test centre was located between the main part of Huntington and Saighton Camp.

Wales national football team manager Gary Speed, born just over the Welsh border in Mancot, lived at a house in the village at the time of his death in November 2011.

== See also ==
- Listed buildings in Huntington, Cheshire
