= Ince Manor =

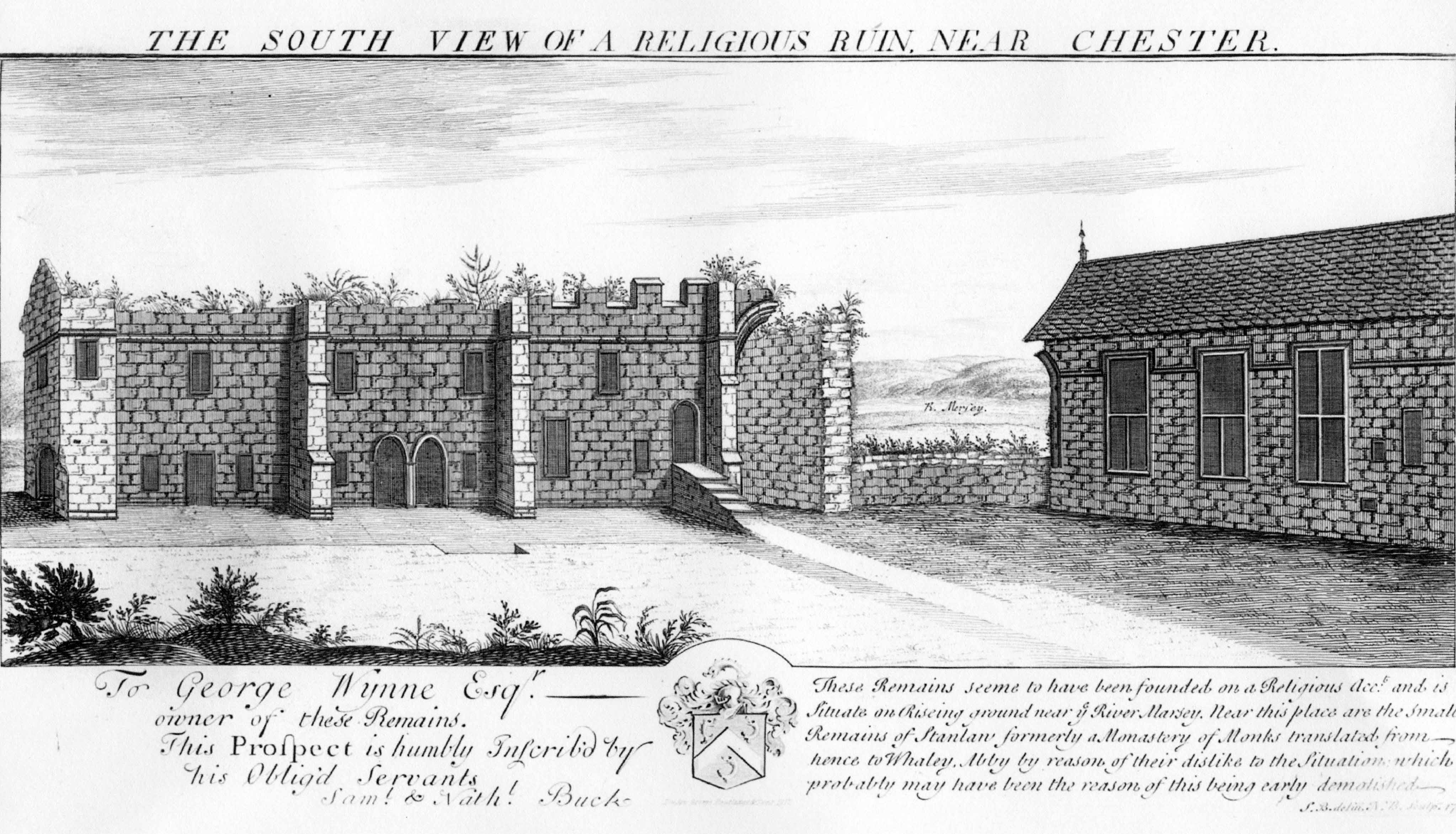
- Engraving of Ince Manor dedicated to George Wynn, Esq. by Samuel and Nathaniel Buck, ca. 1724-31 The hall is on the right

- Location in Cheshire
- 53.2831°N 2.8270°W
- Location: Ince, Cheshire, England
- OS grid reference: SJ 450 766

Listed Building – Grade I
- Designated: 26 September 1963
- Reference no.: 1138810

Scheduled monument
- Designated: 29 December 1952
- Reference no.: 1009635

Ince Manor or Ince Grange is a former monastic grange in the village of Ince in Cheshire, England. The remains of the manor house, consisting of the old hall and the monastery cottages, are recorded in the National Heritage List for England as a designated Grade I listed building, and a scheduled monument It is one of only two surviving monastic manorial buildings in Cheshire, the other being Saighton Grange Gatehouse.

== History ==
Ince Manor is one of the earliest recorded properties of St Werburgh's Abbey, Chester, and was recorded in the Domesday Book. In 1277 Edward I was entertained at the manor. In 1399 and again in 1410 a licence to crenellate was obtained. Following the dissolution of the monasteries the manor remained in church ownership until 1547 when it passed to Sir Richard Cotton, and from his son George, to Sir Hugh Cholmondeley. It then passed to the Vale Royal branch of the Cholmondeleys until 1724, when it was sold by Charles Cholmondeley to Sir George Wynne of Leeswood. (Note: George Wynn of Leeswood, Flint, was created a baronet in 1731, after which he was "Sir" George Wynn; see Burke, A Genealogical and Heraldic History of the Extinct and Dormant Baronetcies, s.v. "Wynne, of Leeswood".) From his heiress, Margaret, the manor passed into the Waring family. The range of domestic buildings dates probably from the late 13th or 14th century and the hall from the early 15th century. The engraving dating from the early 18th century by the topographical draughtsmen and engraver-printsellers Samuel and Nathaniel Buck (pictured) shows the cottages to be a ruin. Ormerod described the surviving buildings in the 19th century which were standing in grounds of "rather more than an acre" with a stone wall to the south and the remains of a moat on the other sides. The former domestic buildings were in use as a farmhouse and the old hall was being used as a barn.

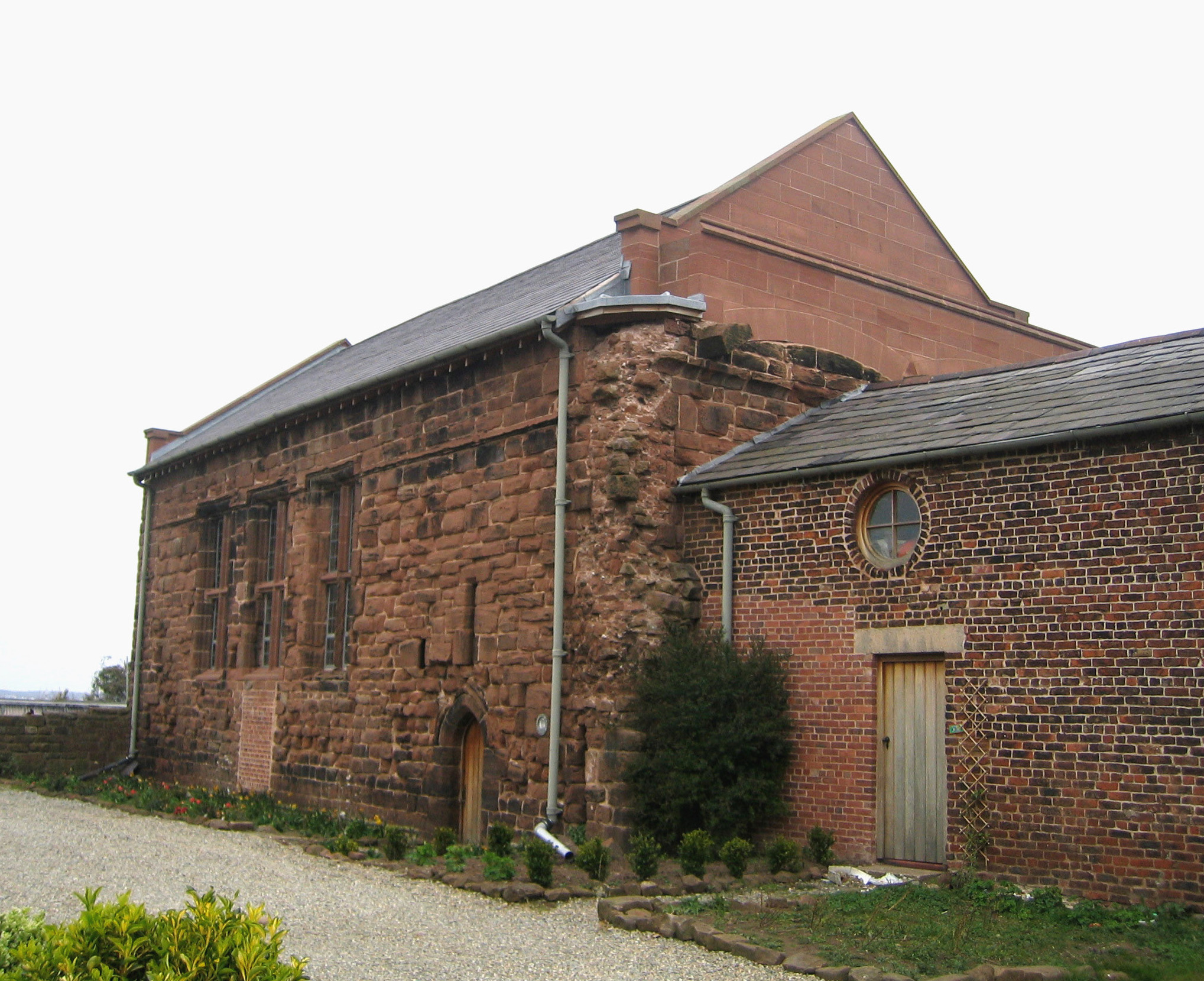
Ince Manor Hall April 2008

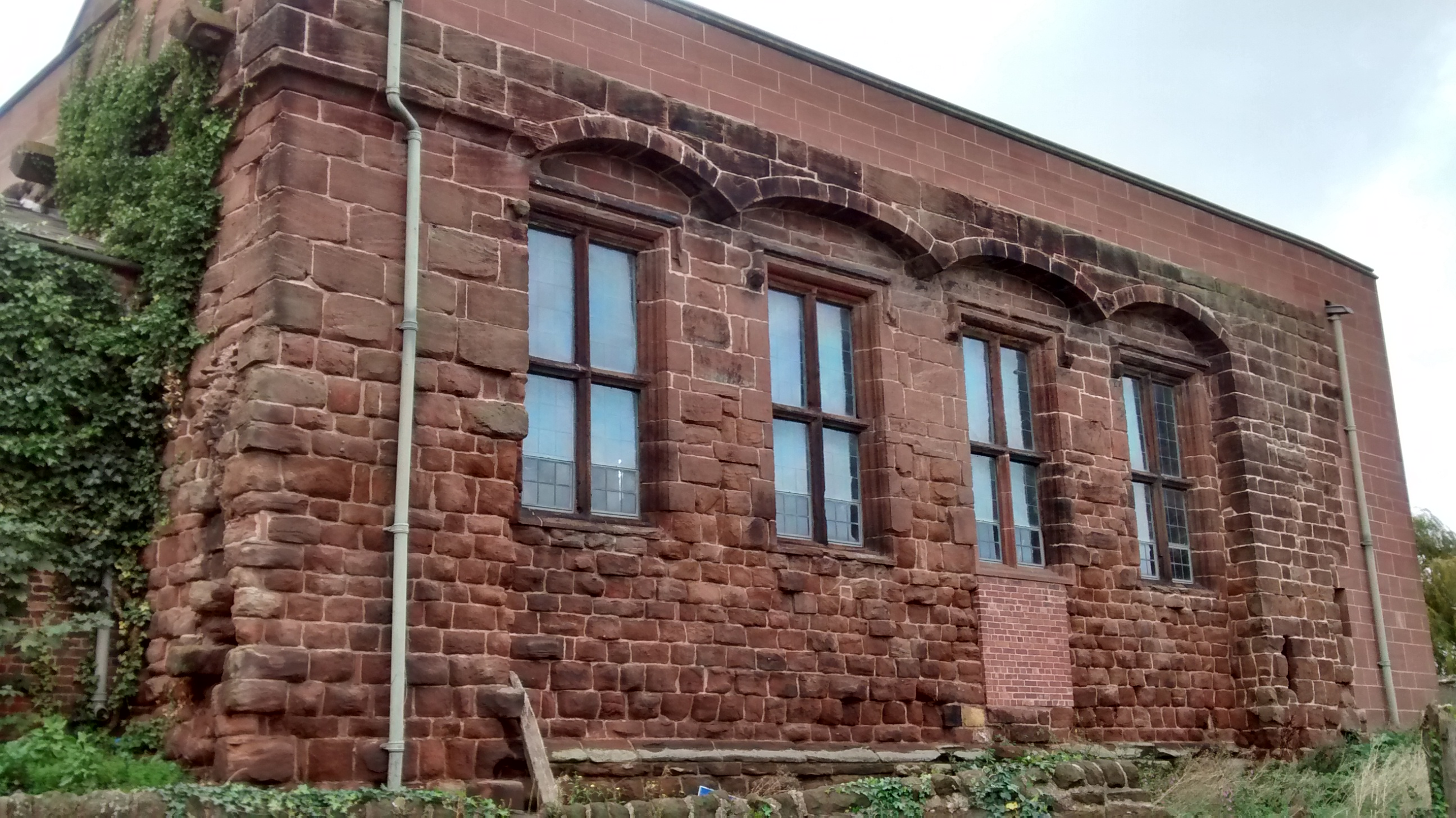
October 2014

== Restoration ==
When the site was visited by the Chester Historic Buildings Preservation Trust in the early 1990s, the hall was protected by a 19th-century roof. The domestic buildings had been in use as cottages until the 1960s but were then without roofs. English Heritage advised that it would be proper to restore the buildings and a feasibility study showed that restoration would be possible. The buildings were bought from the owner by Cheshire County Council, who passed them to the Preservation Trust. Restoration began in 2002, with funding mainly from the Heritage Lottery Fund. The buildings are now back in private ownership.

== Stocks ==
Adjacent to the manor are a pair of vertical stones embedded in the ground with grooves for timber stocks which are listed at Grade II.

== See also ==
- Grade I listed buildings in Cheshire
- Listed buildings in Ince

== References and notes ==
Notes

Citations
