= Churton Heath =

Former civil parish in Cheshire, England

Coordinates: 53.13°N 2.841°W

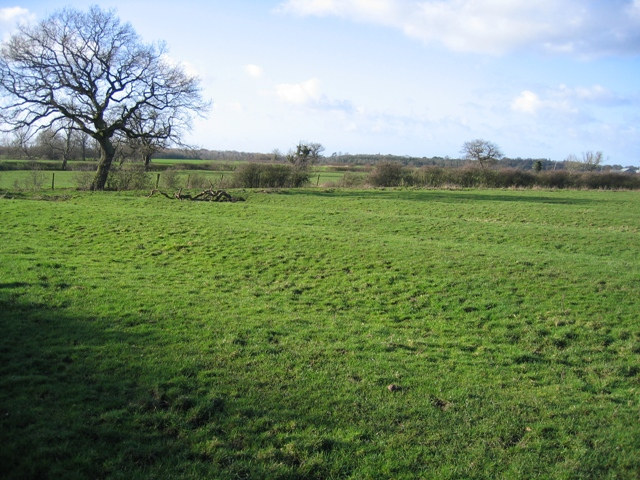
- Ridge and furrow farmland

- Location within Cheshire
- Population: 8 (2001)
- OS grid reference: SJ4359
- Civil parish: Aldford and Saighton
- Unitary authority: Cheshire West and Chester
- Ceremonial county: Cheshire
- Region: North West
- Country: England
- Sovereign state: United Kingdom
- Post town: CHESTER
- Postcode district: CH3
- Dialling code: 01244
- Police: Cheshire
- Fire: Cheshire
- Ambulance: North West
- UK Parliament: Chester South and Eddisbury

Churton Heath is a former civil parish, now in the parish of Aldford and Saighton, in the borough of Cheshire West and Chester and ceremonial county of Cheshire in England. In 2001 it had a population of 8. Churton Heath was formerly a township, in 1866 Churton Heath became a civil parish, on 1 April 2015 the parish was abolished to form "Aldford and Saighton".

== Listed building ==
The parish contains one building designated by English Heritage as a listed building, and included in the National Heritage List for England. This is Churton Heath Farmhouse, a brick building with a slate roof dating from the 18th century, and extended later during that century. It is in two storeys with an attic. It has a doorcase flanked by fluted pilasters. The windows in the older part are sashes, and in the newer part they are casements. The house is listed at Grade II. This grade is the lowest of the three gradings given to listed buildings and is applied to "buildings of national importance and special interest".
