= Saighton Camp =

- Saighton
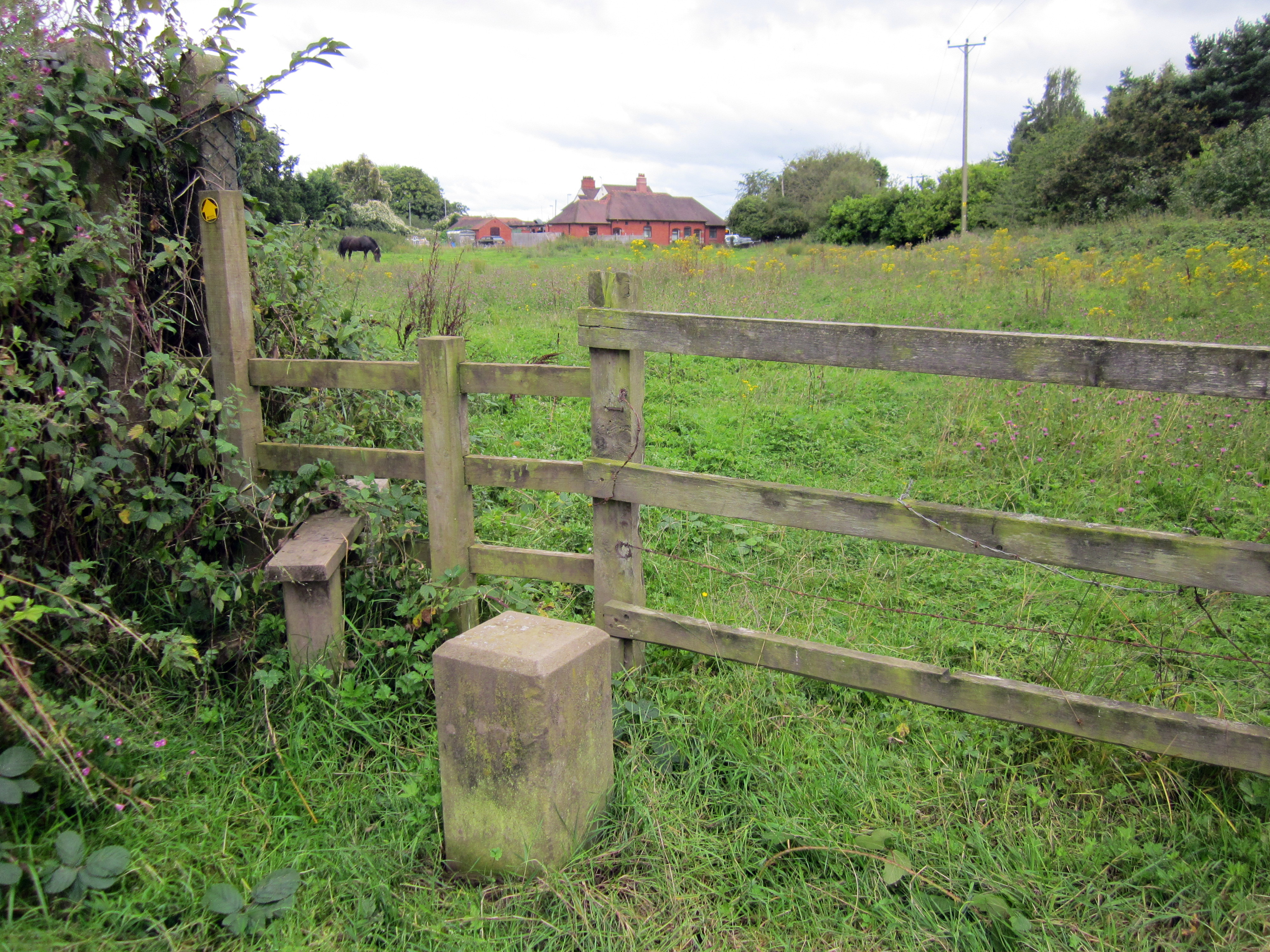
- The stone in the foreground is a War Office boundary stone for Saighton Camp

Site information
- Type: Barracks
- Owner: Ministry of Defence
- Operator: British Army

Location
- Location within Cheshire
- Coordinates: 53.172°N 2.859°W

Site history
- Built: 1938-1939
- Built for: War Office
- In use: 1939-1999

Saighton Camp was a military installation located between Saighton and Huntington covering an area of approximately 33 hectares.

== History ==
The camp was created between 1938 and 1939 for use as a military training camp during the Second World War. It was established as a basic training facility for light anti-aircraft batteries and subsequently became the primary training centre for the 233 Light Anti-Aircraft Training Regiment of the Royal Artillery. In 1949, it became Training Centre No. 12 of the Royal Pioneer Corps, and in the 1950s and early 1960s it became a training centre for the Royal Corps of Signals. The King's Own Royal Border Regiment were based at the site from 1973 to 1974, the Green Howards were based there from 1974 to 1976, the Queen's Lancashire Regiment were based there from 1976 to 1978 and the Gordon Highlanders were based there from 1978 to 1980. The King's Regiment were billeted at the camp until its closure in 1985, when the regiment moved to the Dale Camp, Chester's last remaining military barracks.

In the early 1980s Saighton became a training centre for the Royal Army Medical Corps. It remained open after the barracks closed but its use diminished until it was closed completely in 1999.

In 2015, the site was cleared of its remaining military infrastructure. It is now a residential housing estate.
