= Listed buildings in Saighton =

Saighton is a former civil parish, now in the parish of Aldford and Saighton, in Cheshire West and Chester, England. It contains 15 buildings that are recorded in the National Heritage List for England as designated listed buildings. Of these, one is listed at Grade I, the highest grade, one is listed at Grade II*, the middle grade, and the others are at Grade II. Apart from the village of Saighton, the parish is rural, and includes the gateway of one of the monastic granges of St Werburgh's Abbey, Chester; this, with addition of later buildings, has been converted into a private college. The college buildings are listed, together with the primary school, the parish church, houses and adjoining walls, a farmhouse and farm buildings, a water tower, and a telephone kiosk.

== Key ==
Grade	Criteria
I	Buildings of exceptional interest, sometimes considered to be internationally important
II*	Particularly important buildings of more than special interest
II	Buildings of national importance and special interest

== Buildings ==
Name and location	Photograph	Date	Notes	Grade
St Mary's Church; 53.1391°N 2.8420°W		Late 11th or early 12th century	The oldest part of the church is the chancel arch. There have been later alterations, including a restoration in 1896 by W. M. Boden for the 1st Duke of Westminster. The church consists of a nave without aisles, a chancel, a south porch, a chapel and vestry, and a west bellcote with a shingled spire.	II*
Wall, Abbey Gate College; 53.15089°N 2.83535°W		Medieval (probable)	The wall forms a boundary to the north and west of the college. It is in red sandstone on sandstone bedrock. There are also gateposts dating from about 1870. These have pyramidal finials, and are carved with shields with coats of arms.	II
Abbey Gate College Gatehouse Gateway; 53.15034°N 2.83418°W		1490	This originated as a gatehouse to a monastic grange of St Werburgh's Abbey, Chester. It is constructed in red sandstone, and has three storeys with an archway. On its summit is a crenellated parapet. Other features include an oriel window, other windows that are mullioned, a niche containing a statue, and a turret rising to a greater height than the parapet.	I
Saighton Hall; 53.1546°N 2.8438°W	—	Early 18th century or before (probable)	A farmhouse in rendered brick with slate roofs. It is in two parallel ranges, with gables. The windows are sashes. The doorcase is in painted stone, and has an open Tuscan pediment.	II
Old Vicarage; 53.1522°N 2.8331°W		Early 18th century	A brick house with sandstone dressings and a slate roof. It has three storeys, with a symmetrical front on the left side. The entrance is in the front facing the road. The windows are sashes. At the rear is a 19th-century single-storey bay window.	II
Elm House; 53.1519°N 2.8332°W		c. 1800 or earlier	A brick house with a pebbledashed front and a slate roof. It has two storeys, a main part in two-bays, and a lower right wing, also in two bays. The windows in the main part are sashes, those in the right wing are casements. There is a fragment of sandstone in the right gable.	II
Wall; 53.15206°N 2.83338°W	—	Early 19th century or earlier	The wall runs between the garden of Elm House and the drive to the coach house of the Old Vicarage. It is about 12 feet (3.7 m) high, the lower 7 feet (2.1 m) being in sandstone and the rest in brick.	II
Garden walls, Old Vicarage; 53.15241°N 2.83312°W		Early 19th century	The walls are in sandstone and brick. Attached to them is a carving of the Crucifixion under an ornate hood, dating from about 1870, and a war memorial with a bronze plaque.	II
Abbey Gate College; 53.1504°N 2.8342°W		1861	This originated as a house replacing the monastic buildings of Saighton Grange. It was designed by Edward Hodkinson for the 2nd Marquess of Westminster, and was altered in about 1870–72, and again in 1894–96, by John Douglas for the 1st Duke of Westminster. In 1977 the building was converted into a school, the Abbey Gate College.	II
Abbey Gate College Chapel; 53.15062°N 2.83398°W		c. 1870	The chapel is built in red sandstone with a tiled roof. It is a simple building, rectangular with gables and a bellcote. The windows contain stained glass by Morris & Co.	II
Water tower 53.15210°N 2.83509°W		c. 1870	A three-stage sandstone tower with angle buttresses. In the bottom stage is a round-headed doorway flanked by small rectangular windows. The middle stage contains paired windows, and there are loop holes in the top stage.	II
Saighton Primary School; 53.1527°N 2.8341°W		1872	The school was built for the 2nd Marquess of Westminster, and probably designed by Edward Hodkinson. It is in brick with sandstone dressings on a sandstone plinth, and has a red tile roof. The windows are mullioned, and some are also transomed. On the roof is a simple bellcote and a louvred ventilator. The cast iron railings on a sandstone plinth are included in the listing.	II
Saighton Lane Farm; 53.1615°N 2.8280°W	—	1888–89	The farmhouse was designed by Douglas and Fordham as part of a model farm for the 1st Duke of Westminster. It is built in brown brick with blue brick diapering and timber-framed gables. It has two storeys and an attic. The frames above the porch are inscribed with biblical quotations. The chimneys have spiral moulding on the flues.	II
Farm buildings, Saighton Lane Farm; 53.1619°N 2.8281°W	—	1888–89	The farm buildings were designed by Douglas and Fordham as part of a model farm for the 1st Duke of Westminster. They form an L-shaped plan, and are in two storeys. The left wing is in brown brick with blue brick diapering; the right wing is in brick with a timber-framed upper storey. There is in addition a single-storey wing.	II
Telephone kiosk 53.15243°N 2.83383°W		1935	A K6 type telephone kiosk, designed by Giles Gilbert Scott. It is constructed in cast iron, with a square plan and domed roof. In the panels around the top are three unperforated crowns.	II

== See also ==
- Listed buildings in Rowton
- Listed buildings in Waverton
- Listed buildings in Golborne David
- Listed buildings in Handley
- Listed buildings in Coddington
- Listed buildings in Churton by Farndon
- Listed buildings in Poulton
- Listed buildings in Eaton
- Listed buildings in Eccleston
- Listed buildings in Huntington
