= Listed buildings in Ince =

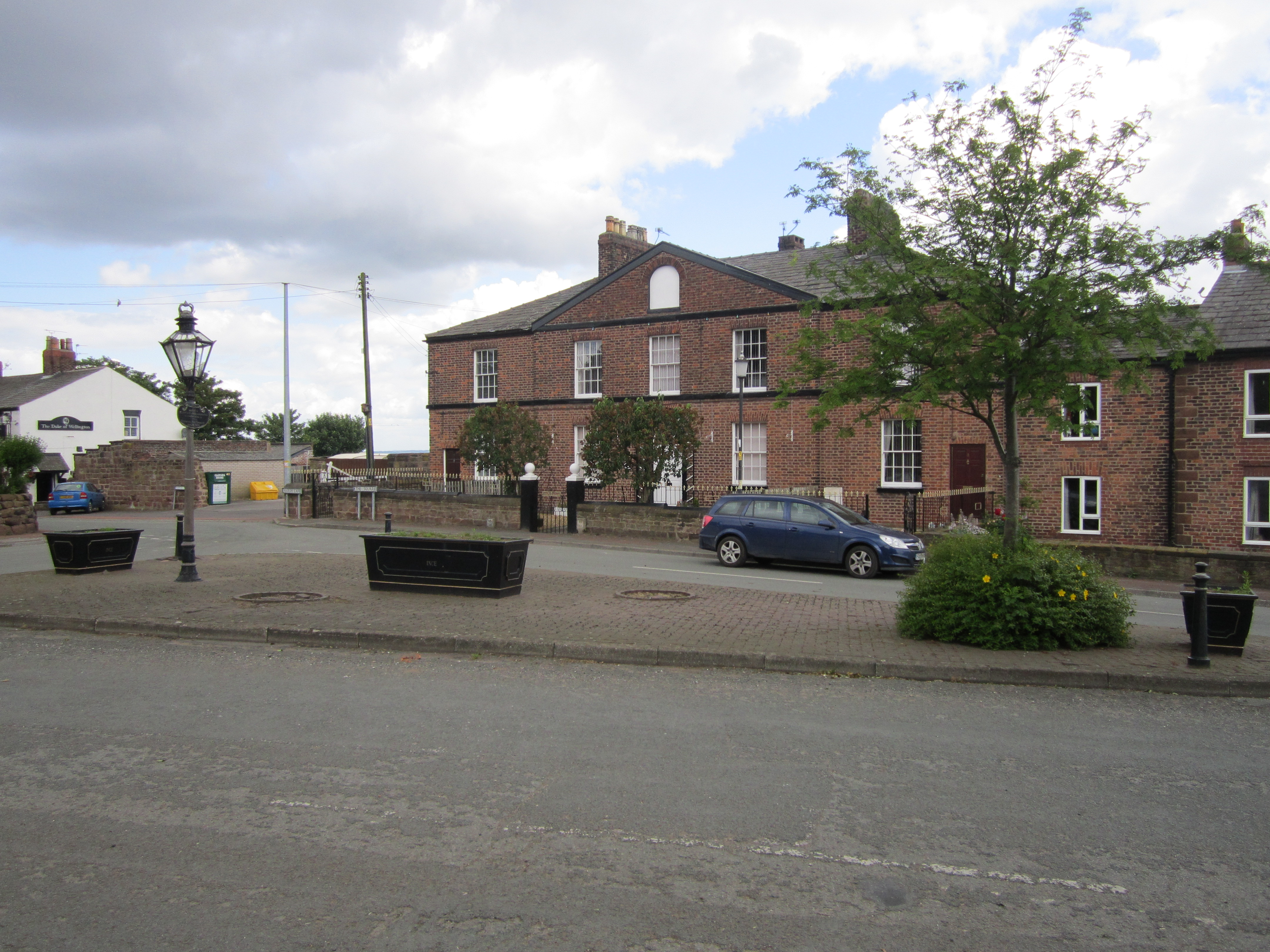
The Square, Ince

Ince is a civil parish in Cheshire West and Chester, England. It contains 25 buildings that are recorded in the National Heritage List for England as designated listed buildings. One is these is of these listed at Grade I, the highest grade, one at Grade II*, the middle grade, and the rest are at the lowest grade, Grade II.

Apart from the village of Ince, the parish is entirely rural, and the listed buildings include farms and farm buildings. During the medieval era, it was the site of Ince Manor, a monastic grange of St Werburgh's, Abbey, Chester, (later Chester Cathedral). Following the dissolution of the monasteries, the surviving buildings were used for other purposes, including domestic use and for farming. These buildings are listed. In the early 19th century it was hoped that the village would be a centre for passengers using the Ince Ferry, and Edmund Yates built a number of properties, including a hotel. However the ferry closed and the buildings, some of which are listed, were converted for domestic use. The other buildings in the list include the village church and associated structures, the village stocks, a commemorative lamp post, and a telephone kiosk.

== Key ==
Grade	Criteria
I	Buildings of exceptional interest, sometimes considered to be internationally important.
II*	Particularly important buildings of more than special interest.
II	Buildings of national importance and special interest.

== Buildings ==
Name and location	Photograph	Date	Notes	Grade
Ince Manor; 53.2831°N 2.8271°W		Late 13th century	This consists of a group of buildings which were formerly a monastic grange. The remaining buildings are in two blocks, the old hall (pictured) and the monastic cottages, forming two sides of a courtyard. They are built in sandstone. The hall has an arched doorway, and mullioned and transomed windows. The cottages had become derelict towards the end of the 20th century, but have been restored. They have rectangular doorways and windows. The former grange is also a scheduled monument.	I
Wall between The Square and the Manor; 53.28254°N 2.82632°W	—	Medieval (probable)	The sandstone wall stretches between the centre of the village and the former Ince Manor. It has been broken in places by modern entrances.	II
Wall between The Square and Park Cottages; 53.28224°N 2.82728°W	—	Medieval (probable)	The sandstone wall stretches between the junction of Kinsey's Lane with Pool Lane and Park Cottages.	II
St James' Church; 53.2813°N 2.8266°W		14th century	The church is built in sandstone with slate roofs. It consists of a nave, a north aisle, a chancel, a south porch, and a west tower. The oldest fabric is in the east window, and the tower dates from the later part of the 15th century. Much of the church was rebuilt in Perpendicular style in 1854 by Edward Hodkinson.	II*
Outbuilding, Village Green Farm; 53.28201°N 2.82562°W	—	17th century	A narrow sandstone building in a single storey with a rectangular plan. It contains a blocked three-light mullioned window, with a string course above. It is suggested that this was a two-storey cottage later reducued to a single storey.	II
Wood Farm Farmhouse; 53.2858°N 2.8307°W	—	17th century	The farmhouse has a long L-shaped plan. It is constructed in brick and sandstone, and has a corrugated iron roof. One of the windows is sashed; the others are casements. The 17th-century interior has been largely conserved, including two inglenooks. The farmhouse was probably originally timber-framed with a thatched roof.	II
Shippon, Wood Farm; 53.2856°N 2.8309°W	—	17th century	The shippon is a long, narrow building in two storeys. It is built in brick with sandstone quoins, and has a thatched roof covered in corrugated iron. Its features include arched doorways, a circular pitch hole, and vertical ventilation slits.	II
Yew Tree Farmhouse and Shippon; 53.2831°N 2.8298°W	—	17th century	The farmhouse and attached shippon are both in brick with Welsh slate roofs. The farmhouse has a projecting porch with a crow-stepped gable and a sandstone label mould. The oak door dates from the 17th century, and has wrought iron hinges and decorative nails. The shippon is in late Georgian style. It has two storeys, and an L-shaped plan. In addition to doorways and windows, it has rectangular pitch holes.	II
T-shaped Shippon, Hall Farm; 53.2865°N 2.8299°W	—	1688	A sandstone farm building with a T-shaped plan, which originated as a combined house and farm building. It has a Welsh slate roof. In the wall is a lintel inscribed with a heart motif, initials and the date. Also in the walls are blocked windows, and rectangular ventilation holes.	II
L-shaped shippon, Hall Farm; 53.2863°N 2.8302°W	—	Early 19th century	The shippon is in late Georgian style. It is built in brick and sandstone with a Welsh slate roof, and has an L-shaped plan. Its features include a loading door, diabolo-shaped ventilators, and a circular pitch hole.	II
Holme Farm; 53.2881°N 2.8185°W		Early 19th century	This consists of a farm house and farm buildings in late Georgian style. All are in brick with Welsh slate roofs. The farmhouse has two storeys and a symmetrical front. The windows are a mix of sashes and casements. The farm buildings consist of a barn and a shippon on the west side of the farmyard.	II
Farm building, Ince Manor; 53.28297°N 2.82685°W	—	Early 19th century	The farm building has a rectangular plan, and is in two storeys. It is built in brick, partly on a sandstone plinth, and has a Welsh slate roof with a tiled ridge. There are three doors, two windows, and two circular pitch holes.	II
Lower Green Farmhouse; 53.2818°N 2.8253°W	—	Early 19th century	The brick farmhouse is in Georgian style. It has a Welsh slate roof, and stone lintels and cills. The house has two storeys, with a three-bay front. The windows have 30 panes with small opening casements. The garden has a sandstone wall.	II
Shippon, Lower Green Farm; 53.2817°N 2.8248°W	—	Early 19th century	The shippon is in Georgian style. It is in two storeys, the lower part built in sandstone, and the upper part in brick. It has a Welsh slate roof, and rectangular windows and doorway. In the upper part are five circular pitch holes.	II
Profitt's Lodge; 53.28489°N 2.82644°W	—	Early 19th century	A square sandstone cottage with a pyramidal roof in Welsh slate. It is in a single-storey, and has a central brick chimney. The porch has a hipped roof, and is flanked by windows with pointed arches. Sandstone steps lead up to the front door.	II
Barn, Wood Farm; 53.2854°N 2.8309°W	—	Early 19th century	The barn is built in sandstone with a Welsh slate roof. It is in Georgian style, and has coped stone gables. At each end is a full-height arched entrance. Along the sides are rectangular pitch holes.	II
1, 2 and 3 The Square; 53.2822°N 2.8258°W		Early 19th century	A brick building in late Georgian style that originated as a hotel for passengers using the Ince ferry, since converted into three dwellings. It has two storeys, a symmetrical five-bay front, and a hipped Welsh slate roof. The central three bays protrude slightly forwards and have a pediment containing a blind round-headed arch. All the windows are sashes. The garden walls are included in the designation.	II
7, 8 and 9 The Square; 53.2822°N 2.8264°W	—	Early 19th century	A brick terrace in late Georgian style with a Welsh slate roof. It has a symmetrical front with a central gable containing a blocked circular opening. Most of the windows are original sashes, others are replacement casements.	II
Park Cottages; 53.2825°N 2.8274°W	—	Early 19th century (probable)	A terrace of four sandstone cottages, probably converted from earlier farm buildings of the manor. They have brick gabled walls at the ends, Welsh slate roofs, and a sandstone ridge. The windows and doorways have been cut through pre-existing stonework. The windows are casements, and there are traces of slit windows.	II
Churchyard wall 53.28120°N 2.82713°W	—	Late 19th century	The wall to the churchyard of St James' Church is in sandstone. At the entry to the churchyard is a pair of gate posts with octagonal finials.	II
Lamp post, Churchyard; 53.28158°N 2.82676°W		Late 19th century	The lamp post stands by the entrance to the north gate of St James' Church. It is in cast iron. The lamp has an octagonal base, a circular shaft, four wrought iron columns, and a lantern at the top.	II
Coronation lamp post and lantern 53.28214°N 2.82609°W		1902	The lamp post was erected to celebrate the coronation of Edward VII. It is made in cast iron, and has a fluted stem with an inscribed plaque. At the top is a hexagonal lantern surmounted by a crown.	II
Telephone kiosk 53.28211°N 2.82637°W		1935	A K6 type telephone kiosk, designed by Giles Gilbert Scott. It is constructed in cast iron, with a square plan and domed roof. In the panels around the top are three unperforated crowns.	II
Stocks; 53.28287°N 2.82666°W		Undated	The stocks stand near the old hall of Ince Manor. They consist of a pair of stone posts with grooves in the internal faces for timberwork.	II

== See also ==
- Listed buildings in Ellesmere Port
- Listed buildings in Elton
- Listed buildings in Frodsham
- Listed buildings in Helsby
