= Lea Newbold =

Former civil parish in Cheshire, England

Coordinates: 53.125°N 2.85°W

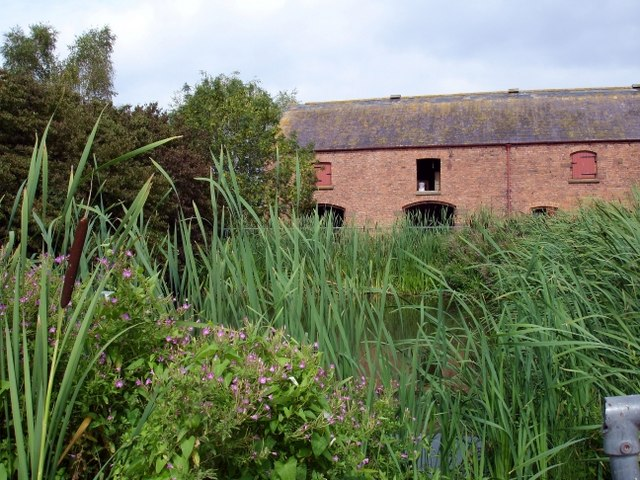
- Lea Hall Farm

- Location within Cheshire
- Population: 8 (2001)
- OS grid reference: SJ432589
- Civil parish: Aldford and Saighton
- Unitary authority: Cheshire West and Chester
- Ceremonial county: Cheshire
- Region: North West
- Country: England
- Sovereign state: United Kingdom
- Post town: MALPAS
- Postcode district: CH3
- Dialling code: 01244
- Police: Cheshire
- Fire: Cheshire
- Ambulance: North West
- UK Parliament: City of Chester

Lea Newbold was formerly a civil parish in Cheshire, England. It covered a rural area containing a few farms lying to the east of the village of Aldford and 5 miles (8.0 km) south of Chester. The parish was abolished in 2015 to become part of the parish of Aldford and Saighton.

== History ==
Lea Newbold was historically a township in the ancient parish of Chester St Oswald, which used the south transept of Chester Cathedral as its parish church. Although within the parish of Chester St Oswald, Lea Newbold lay outside the city's municipal boundaries, being in the rural area to the south of the city. From the 17th century onwards, parishes were gradually given various civil functions under the poor laws, in addition to their original ecclesiastical functions. In some cases, including Chester St Oswald, the civil functions were exercised by the townships rather than the wider parishes. In 1866, the legal definition of 'parish' was changed to be the areas used for administering the poor laws, and so Lea Newbold became a civil parish.

In 2001 (the last census for which statistics were published for the parish) it had a population of 8. On 1 April 2015 the parish was abolished and the area became part of the new parish of Aldford and Saighton.

== See also ==
- Listed buildings in Lea Newbold
