= Eccleston Ferry House =

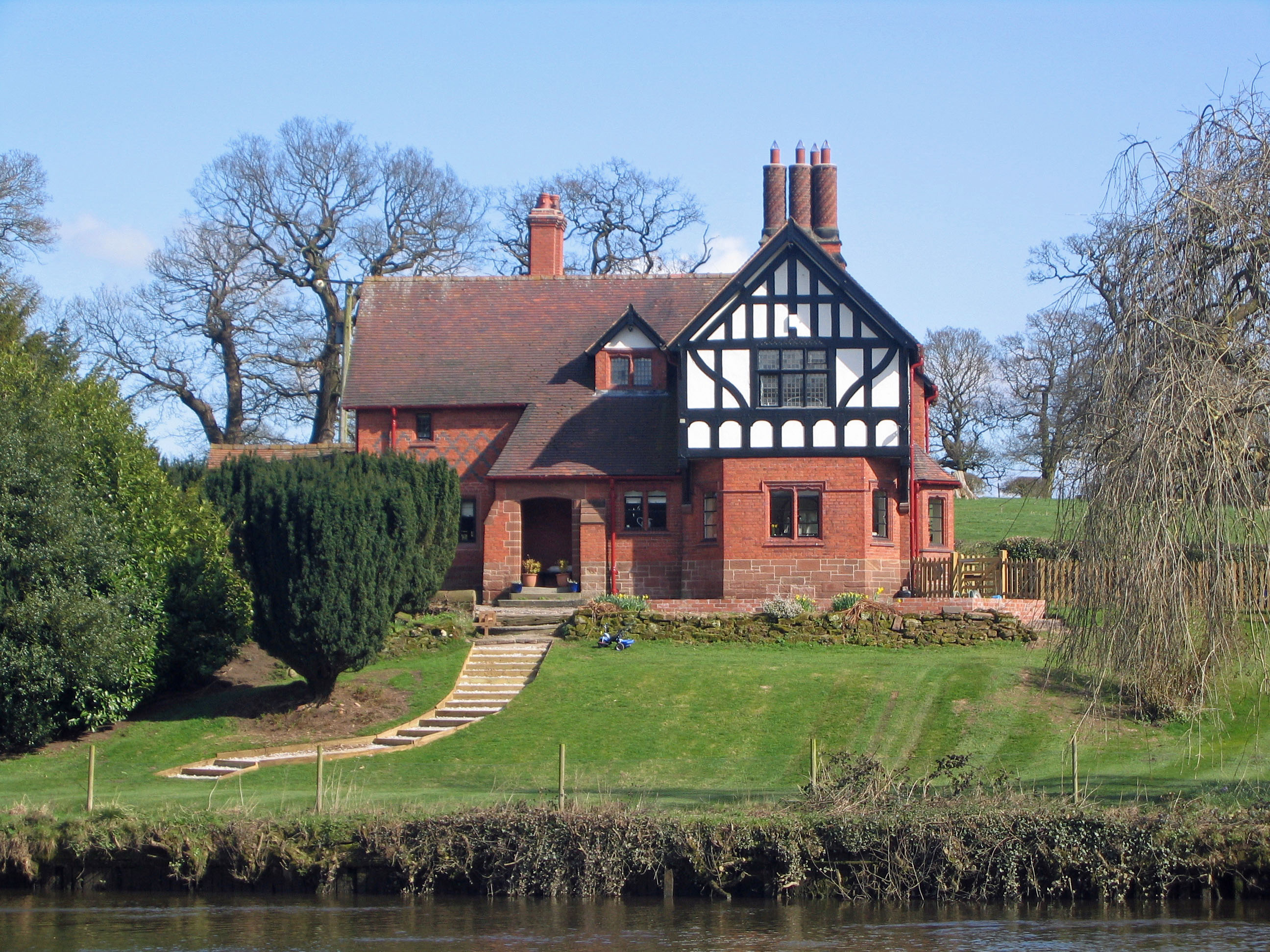
- Eccleston Ferry House

- Location in Cheshire
- 53.1533°N 2.8745°W
- Location: Eccleston, Cheshire, England
- OS grid reference: SJ 416 622

History
- Built: 1887
- Built for: Hugh Grosvenor, 1st Duke of Westminster

Site notes
- Architect: John Douglas

Listed Building – Grade II
- Designated: 22 August 1984
- Reference no.: 1130635

Eccleston Ferry House is a farmhouse southeast of the village of Eccleston, Cheshire, England. It is on the east bank of the River Dee near the site of an ancient ferry crossing of the river. The house is recorded in the National Heritage List for England as a designated Grade II listed building.

== History ==
The house was built in 1887 for Hugh Grosvenor, 1st Duke of Westminster, and designed by the Chester architect John Douglas.

== Architecture ==
The farmhouse is constructed in Ruabon red brick, with red sandstone dressings and some timber framing, on a stone plinth. The main front faces the river and has four bays. The right bay projects forwards and has two storeys; the lower storey is in brick and is canted, the upper storey is timber-framed and has a gable. The middle two bays contain a porch and a dormer, and the left bay has some brick diapering.

== Associated structures ==
In the garden is a structure described as a bandstand or a café. It was also designed by Douglas for the duke, and was used for visitors taking boat trips on the adjacent River Dee. It is an open timber-framed building with a timber balustrade standing on a sandstone plinth, and with a red tiled roof. The structure has a tiebeam inscribed with the date 1888, and carrying a plaster panel depicting a goddess with serpent staff and a cornucopia, which is flanked by dolphins and with the motto "PEACE AND PLENTY". It is also designated as a Grade II listed building.

== See also ==
- Listed buildings in Huntington, Cheshire
- List of houses and associated buildings by John Douglas
