= St Peter's Church, Waverton =

Coordinates: 53.1645°N 2.8065°W

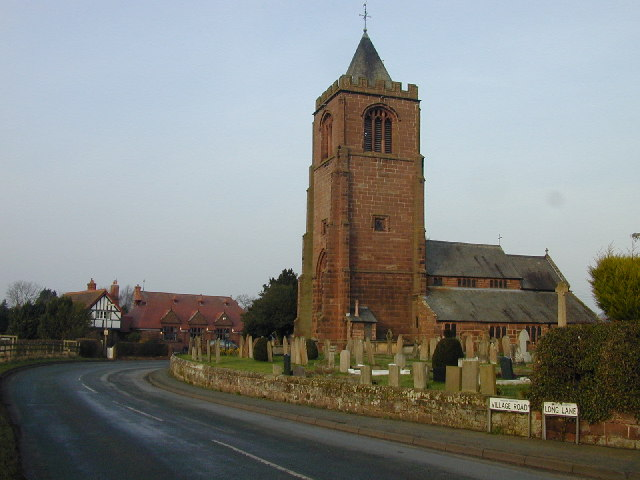
- St Peter's Church, Waverton

- Location in Cheshire
- OS grid reference: SJ 462,633
- Location: Waverton, Cheshire
- Country: England
- Denomination: Anglican
- Website: St Peter's Church, Waverton

History
- Status: Parish church
- Dedication: St Peter

Architecture
- Functional status: Active
- Heritage designation: Grade II*
- Designated: 1 March 1967
- Architect: John Douglas
- Architectural type: Church
- Style: Gothic, Gothic Revival
- Completed: 1888

Specifications
- Materials: Ashlar red sandstone Lakeland green slate roof

Administration
- Province: York
- Diocese: Chester
- Archdeaconry: Chester
- Deanery: Malpas
- Parish: Waverton with Aldford and Bruera

Clergy
- Rector: Rev Jules Beauchamp

St Peter's Church is in the village of Waverton, Cheshire, England. The church is recorded in the National Heritage List for England as a designated Grade II* listed building. It is an active Anglican parish church in the diocese of Chester, the archdeaconry of Chester and the deanery of Malpas. Its benefice is combined with those of St John, Aldford and St Mary, Bruera.

== History ==
The earliest documentary evidence of a place of worship on the site is in a charter of confirmation dated 1093. Later references are in a will dated 1599 and in documents relating to the building of a north chapel in 1640 by John Tilston of Lower Huxley Hall. In the 19th century, restorations of the body of the church took place, one in 1845 and another in 1888 by John Douglas when the clerestory was rebuilt. The pyramidal roof was added to the tower in the late 19th century.

== Architecture ==
=== Exterior ===
The church is built in ashlar Waverton red sandstone with a Lakeland green slate roof. The plan consists of a large west tower, a nave of three bays with a clerestory, a chancel of one bay, and north and south aisles. The tower is large and, in the opinion of Richards, disproportionate to the size of the church. It is in three stages with a four-light Perpendicular window dated 1888 on the west face. Above this are square openings with quatrefoils, a single string course, three-light bell openings and an embattled parapet. The pyramidal roof is recessed and shingled. The doorway on the west face is Tudor in style and it leads to a porch containing a weathered statue of the Virgin and Child between shields of the Dutton and Hatton families.

=== Interior ===
The 17th-century roofs of the nave and aisles were retained during the restorations and are dated 1635. The octagonal font is from the 17th century. The chancel walls are timber-framed internally and are possibly medieval, but more likely a later copy of the original walls. Memorials are to previous rectors of the church and to members of the Dutton family of Hatton. The east window has three lights and is Perpendicular in style. The pulpit dated 1903 is a memorial to the 1st Duke of Westminster. In the tower are the royal arms of Charles II, painted in 1663, and a table of tithes. There is a ring of eight bells. Four of these are dated 1615 by George Lee, two dated 1908 are by John Taylor and Company, and the other two are dated 2008 by Taylors Eayre & Smith Ltd. The parish registers date from 1582 and the churchwardens' accounts from 1744.

== External features ==
The gates, gatepiers and churchyard walls, which are almost complete, are listed at Grade II. In the churchyard is a red sandstone sundial dated 1731 which is also listed at Grade II. The churchyard also contains the war graves of two soldiers of World War I, and an airman of World War II.

== See also ==
- Grade II* listed buildings in Cheshire West and Chester
- Listed buildings in Waverton, Cheshire
- List of church restorations, amendments and furniture by John Douglas
