= Abbey Gate College =

Coordinates: 53.15157°N 2.833571°W

- Cheshire, Chester; England

Information
- Type: Independent school
- Established: 8 September 1977
- Department for Education URN: 111484 Tables
- Website: www.abbeygatecollege.co.uk

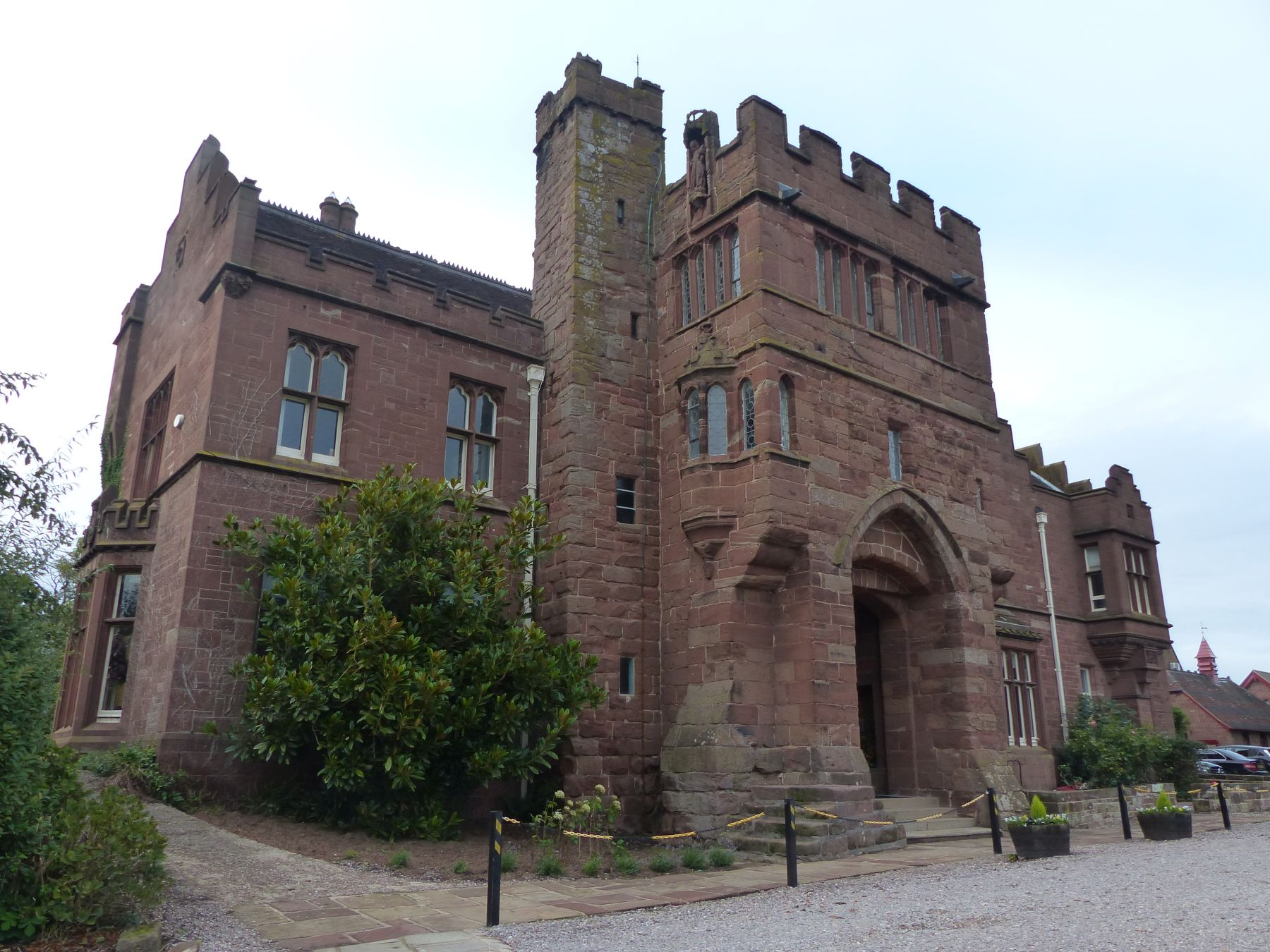
The main college building, which incorporates a 15th-century monastic gatehouse

Abbey Gate College is an independent school in Chester, Cheshire, England for pupils aged 4 – 18 years. The infant and junior school is based in the village of Aldford, 2 miles (3.2 km) from the senior school in Saighton.

== History ==
Abbey Gate College opened its doors to the first group of pupils on 8 September 1977.

== Notable former pupils ==
- Seb Morris, British GT Championship driver

== See also ==
- Listed buildings in Saighton
