= Buerton, Cheshire West and Chester =

Former civil parish in Cheshire, England

Coordinates: 53.138°N 2.861°W

Buerton
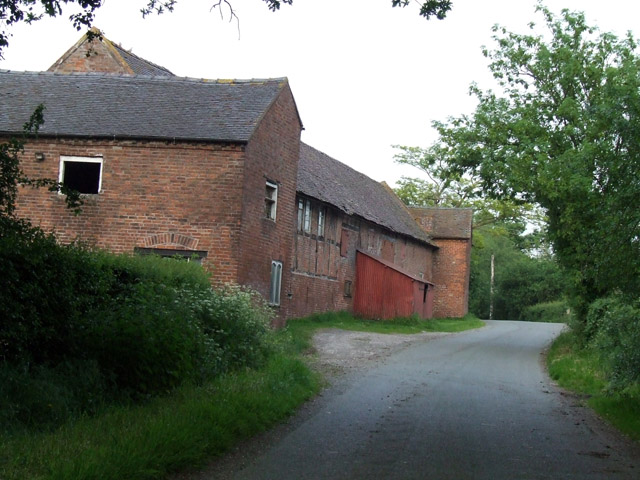
- Woodhouse Farm, Buerton

- Location within Cheshire
- Population: 22 (2001)
- OS grid reference: SJ424604
- Civil parish: Aldford and Saighton
- Unitary authority: Cheshire West and Chester
- Ceremonial county: Cheshire
- Region: North West
- Country: England
- Sovereign state: United Kingdom
- Post town: CHESTER
- Postcode district: CH3
- Dialling code: 01244
- Police: Cheshire
- Fire: Cheshire
- Ambulance: North West
- UK Parliament: Chester South and Eddisbury

Buerton is a former civil parish, now in the parish of Aldford and Saighton, in the unitary authority area of Cheshire West and Chester and the ceremonial county of Cheshire, England. According to the 2001 census it had a population of 22. Buerton was formerly a chapelry in the parish of St Oswald, in 1866 Buerton became a separate civil parish, on 1 April 2015 the parish was abolished to form "Aldford and Saighton". From 1974 to 2009 it was in Chester district.

== See also ==
- Listed buildings in Buerton, Cheshire West and Chester
