= Listed buildings in Huntington, Cheshire =

Huntington is a civil parish in Cheshire West and Chester, England. It contains nine buildings that are recorded in the National Heritage List for England as designated listed buildings, all of which are at Grade II. This grade is the lowest of the three gradings given to listed buildings and is applied to "buildings of national importance and special interest". The parish is entirely rural, and all the listed buildings are domestic or related to farming.

Name and location	Photograph	Date	Notes
Grange Farmhouse; 53.1590°N 2.8629°W	—	1653	The upper storey was rebuilt during the following century (it is dated 1755), and additions were made to the rear in the 19th century. The brick farmhouse has a Welsh slate roof, and is in three storeys. The front is symmetrical with three bays, and two short ranges at the back. The three-storey porch projects forward and is gabled. The windows are casements.
Cheaveley Hall Farmhouse; 53.1491°N 2.8684°W		Late 17th century	Alteration and additions were made in the 18th and 19th centuries. The farmhouse is built in brick on a plastered plinth, and has a Welsh slate roof of two parallel ridges. It has two storeys, and a three-bay front with two gables, The doorway is reached by five stone steps with iron balusters.
Meadowhouse Farmhouse; 53.1714°N 2.8704°W		Early 18th century	Additions were made to the farmhouse in the 20th century. It is built in brick with a Welsh slate roof. The farmhouse has a T-shaped plan, is in two storeys, and has a symmetrical three-bay north front. The windows are casements.
Barn, Meadowhouse Farm; 53.1712°N 2.8709°W		Early 18th century	Alterations were made to the barn later in the century and in the 20th century. It has an L-shaped plan with two ranges. The barn is built in brick, and has a Welsh slate roof. Its features include doorways, loading bays, and ventilators in a diamond pattern.
Larger farm building, Huntington Old Hall; 53.1643°N 2.8678°W	—	Late 18th century	The building is in two ranges, forming an L-shaped plan, The west range is longer and original, the south range being added in the early 19th century. The building is constructed in brick on a stone plinth, Part of it is roofed in Welsh slate, the rest in concrete tiles. Both ranges have semi-circular doorways, circular pitch holes, and rectangular openings.
Smaller farm building, Huntington Old Hall; 53.1646°N 2.8678°W	—	Late 18th century	The farm building is built in brick on a stone plinth, and has a Welsh slate roof. It has an L-shaped plan. Each range has two semi-circular doorways, circular pitch holes, ventilators in a diamond pattern, and a loading bay.
Farm buildings, Cheaveley Hall Farm; 53.1494°N 2.8686°W		Mid- to late 19th century	The farm buildings were probably designed by John Douglas for the 1st Duke of Westminster. They form an L-shaped plan, the lower part being in brick, and the upper parts timber-framed; they have a red tile roof. The buildings are in one and two storeys, the southwest range having 16 bays, and the northwest range 10 bays. On the ridge of the southwest range is a two-tier circular dovecote with a pyramidal shingled roof and a weathervane. Other features include mullioned windows, a cart opening, and a loading bay.
Eccleston Ferry Farmhouse; 53.15331°N 2.87455°W		1887	The farmhouse was designed by John Douglas for the 1st Duke of Westminster. It is built in Ruabon red brick, with red sandstone dressings and some timber framing, on a stone plinth. The farmhouse has two storeys and a four-bay front. The right bay projects forward under a gable, and has a mullioned and transomed three-light window. The central two bays contain a porch with a dormer above. In the left bay is blue brick diapering.
Bandstand in garden of Eccleston Ferry Farmhouse; 53.15317°N 2.8747°W		1888	This was designed by John Douglas for the 1st Duke of Westminster and used as a bandstand or café for visitors taking boat trips on the River Dee. It is constructed in open timber framing on a sandstone plinth with a red tiled roof. On a tiebeam is the date and a plaster panel depicting a goddess with a serpent staff and a cornucopia, flanked by dolphins, and with a motto.

== See also ==
- Listed buildings in Aldford
- Listed buildings in Chester
- Listed buildings in Christleton
- Listed buildings in Eaton
- Listed buildings in Eccleston
- Listed buildings in Great Boughton
- Listed buildings in Rowton
- Listed buildings in Saighton
