= Listed buildings in Waverton, Cheshire =

Waverton is a civil parish in Cheshire West and Chester, England. It contains 17 buildings that are recorded in the National Heritage List for England as designated listed buildings. Of these, one is listed at Grade II*, the middle grade, and the others are at Grade II. Apart from the village of Waverton, the parish is rural. Passing through the parish is the Shropshire Union Canal, and three of the bridges crossing this are listed. The other listed buildings in the parish include the parish church, a sundial in the churchyard and the churchyard walls, a former steam mill, a former railway station and goods shed, a former school, a former institute, and a war memorial, together with houses and cottages.

== Key ==
Grade	Criteria
II*	Particularly important buildings of more than special interest
II	Buildings of national importance and special interest

== Buildings ==
Name and location	Photograph	Date	Notes	Grade
St Peter's Church; 53.1645°N 2.8065°W		16th century	The oldest part of the church is the tower, the aisles and nave roof dating from the 17th century. It was restored in 1845, and again in 1888 by John Douglas. The church is constructed in local red sandstone, with a Lakeland slate roof. It consists of a nave with a clerestory, aisles, a chancel, and a west tower with a pyramidal roof.	II*
Old Post Office Cottage; 53.16520°N 2.80744°W	—	Early 18th century	This was later extended, starting as a cottage and shippon, and later converted into a cottage. It is in rendered brick, the original roof being thatched, and the later part slated. The cottage is in two storeys, and has a four-bay front. The porch is in brick and is gabled; the windows are casements. Inside the cottage is an inglenook.	II
Sundial; 53.16438°N 2.80663°W	—	1731	The sundial stands in the churchyard of St Peter's Church. It consists of a baluster on a square plinth that stands on a circular base. The square capstone carries an inscribed brass plate.	II
Davies's Bridge; 53.16902°N 2.80522°W		c. 1776	This accommodation bridge is bridge number 118 crossing the Shropshire Union Canal. It was designed by Samuel Weston for the Chester Canal Company. The bridge is built in brick and stone, and consists of a single segmental arch with curving wing walls that end in pilasters.	II
Faulkners Bridge; 53.16027°N 2.79819°W		c. 1776	This accommodation bridge is bridge number 116 crossing the Shropshire Union Canal. It was designed by Samuel Weston for the Chester Canal Company. The bridge is built in brick and stone, and consists of a single segmental arch with curving wing walls that end in pilasters.	II
Salmons Bridge; 53.16523°N 2.79997°W		c. 1776	This accommodation bridge is bridge number 117 crossing the Shropshire Union Canal. It was designed by Samuel Weston for the Chester Canal Company. The bridge is built in brick and stone, and consists of a single segmental arch with curving wing walls that end in pilasters.	II
Victoria Mill; 53.17243°N 2.81557°W	—	Early to mid 19th century	Originating as a steam mill beside the Shropshire Union Canal, it has been converted for residential use. The mill is built in brick with a Welsh slate roof. It is in three storeys with an attic, and has a four-bay front. The second bay projects forward under a gable, and the fourth bay is lower. The windows are casements, some under arched heads.	II
Walls, gate piers, and gates 53.16447°N 2.80609°W	—	19th century (probable)	The walls are in sandstone, and form an almost complete circuit of the churchyard of St Peter's Church. The square gate piers are also in sandstone, and have pyramidal caps and finials. The gates are in iron.	II
Church Cottages: Castleview; 53.16293°N 2.80636°W	—	1855 and 1863	A pair of estate cottages for the 2nd Marquess of Westminster, built in brick with sandstone dressings, Welsh slate roofs and stone copings. They are in two storeys, and have a front of four bays. The central bays have coped gables, and each lateral bay contains a porch. The windows are casements.	II
Church Cottages: Grayrigg; 53.16391°N 2.80633°W	—	1865	A pair of estate cottages for the 2nd Marquess of Westminster, built in red sandstone with Welsh slate roofs and stone copings. They are in two storeys, and have a front of four bays. The central bays have coped gables, and each lateral bay contains a porch. The windows are casements.	II
Church Cottages: Sandcroft; 53.16335°N 2.80647°W	—	c. 1865	A pair of estate cottages for the 2nd Marquess of Westminster, built in red sandstone with Welsh slate roofs and stone copings. They are in two storeys, and have a symmetrical front of six bays. The two central bays have coped gables, and the windows are casements.	II
School and schoolmaster's house 53.1649°N 2.8069°W		1877	These were designed by John Douglas for the 1st Duke of Westminster. The school is in red sandstone, is in a single-storey, and has a five-bay front. The central three bays contain mullioned and transomed windows under gables. The house is joined to the school by a single-storey passage. It is in brick with sandstone dressings and a red tiled roof. The house is in two storeys with timber framing in the upper storey. Other features include an oriel window and a canted bay window.	II
Church House Farmhouse; 53.1649°N 2.8063°W	—	1882–83	The farmhouse was designed by John Douglas for the 1st Duke of Westminster. It is in red brick on a stone plinth, with some diapering, red sandstone dressings, and a red tiled roof surmounted by finials. The house is in three storeys, and has a three-bay north front with service buildings behind. The central bay contains a gabled two-storey porch, and in the left bay is a gabled dormer. The windows are mullioned.	II
Waverton railway station 53.16625°N 2.82487°W		1897	The railway station has closed and has since been used as offices. It was built for the London and North Western Railway and paid for by the 1st Duke of Westminster. It is constructed in brick on a stone plinth with sandstone dressings and a Lakeland slate roof with lead finials. The station building is in a single storey and has a front of six bays.	II
Institute and caretaker's house 53.16558°N 2.80634°W	—	1898–99	A hall and house designed by Douglas and Minshull for the 1st Duke of Westminster. It is built in red Ruabon brick with blue brick diapering, buff sandstone dressings, and a Welsh slate roof with a red tiled crest. It has a five-bay front, the left three bays forming a single-storey hall, and the right two bays a two-storey house. The windows are mullioned and transomed. On the roof of the hall is an octagonal ventilator with a louvred spire, lucarnes, and a ball finial. The chimney stacks have twisted brickwork.	II
Goods shed 53.16649°N 2.82481°W	—	c. 1900	The goods shed was built for the London and North Western Railway. It is weather boarded, and has a roof partly in Lakeland slate, and partly glazed. The building is rectangular, with a canopy on each side, under which are sliding doors.	II
War memorial 53.16426°N 2.80656°W	—	1920	The war memorial is in the churchyard of St Peter's Church. It is in sandstone, and takes the form of a Celtic cross about 4 metres (13 ft) high. It consists of a base of three square steps, a square plinth, and a tapering shaft carrying a wheel-head cross. On the front and back of the cross are carved interlace patterns. On the plinth are inscriptions and the names of those who were lost in both World Wars.	II
