= Aldford and Saighton =

Civil parish in Cheshire, England

Coordinates: 53.12862°N 2.86915°W

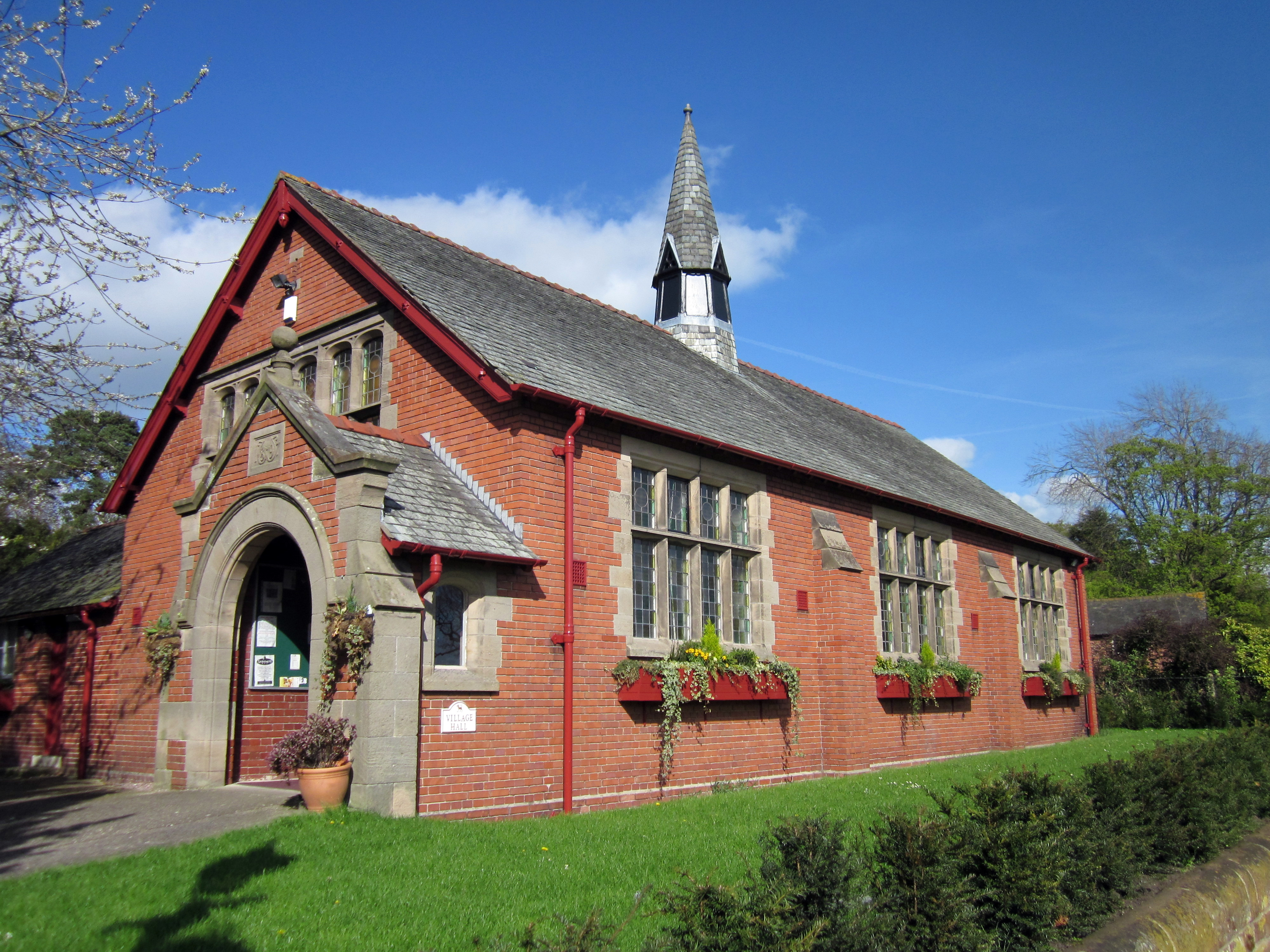
- Aldford Village Hall

- Location within Cheshire
- Population: 477 (2021 census)
- Civil parish: Aldford and Saighton
- Unitary authority: Cheshire West and Chester
- Ceremonial county: Cheshire
- Region: North West
- Country: England
- Sovereign state: United Kingdom
- UK Parliament: Chester South and Eddisbury

Aldford and Saighton is a civil parish in Cheshire, England, covering the villages of Aldford, Saighton, and surrounding rural areas.

== History ==
The civil parish was created in 2015, covering the combined area of the five abolished parishes of Aldford, Buerton, Churton Heath, Lea Newbold, and Saighton, subject to a minor alteration to the boundary with the neighbouring parish of Hargrave and Huxley. The five parishes had previously been under a grouped parish council since 1972.

== Governance ==
There are two tiers of local government covering Aldford and Saighton, at parish and unitary authority level: Aldford and Saighton Parish Council, and Cheshire West and Chester Council. The parish council generally meets either at Saighton Village Hall or Aldford Village Hall.
