= List of castles in Cheshire =

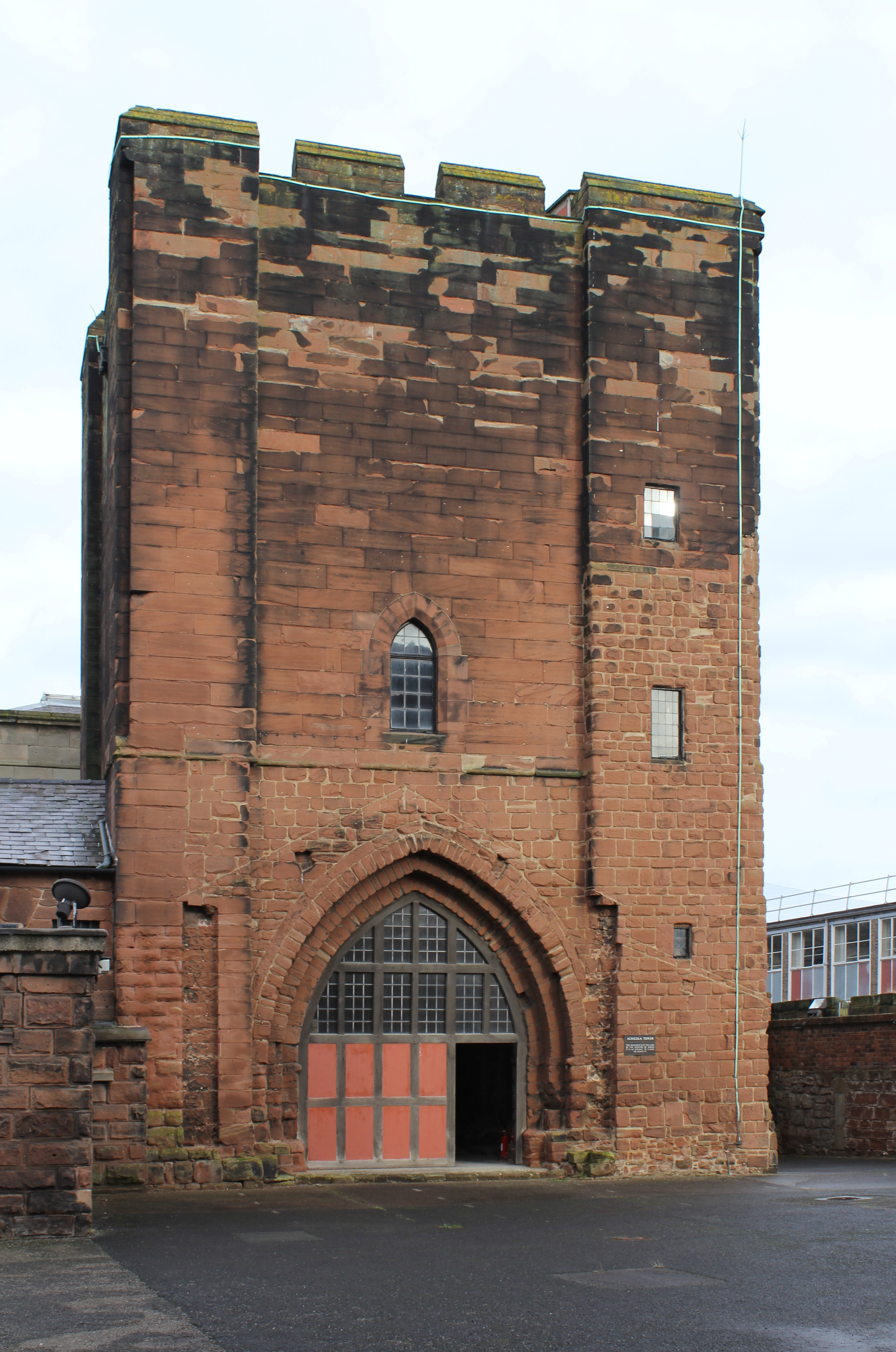
The Agricola Tower at Chester Castle was built as the main entrance to the castle c.1200.

There are 20 castles in the county of Cheshire in North West England.

== Introduction ==
Cheshire is one of the historic counties of England and its historic boundaries are different from the modern county lines. Some castles that were formerly in Cheshire are now in Greater Manchester. In addition, Warrington Castle is historically a part of Lancashire but is within the current boundaries of Cheshire. Before the Norman conquest of England began in 1066, defensive sites in England were communal, such as Anglo-Saxon burhs built as a defence against the Danes. Castles were popularised in England by the Normans – although a few sites in the south-east pre-dating the Norman conquest – and were owned by the feudal lords. The primary purpose of a castle was military: to be used as a base of operations and to control the surrounding areas. A castle was considered to be a stamp of authority over the population of an area, and a status symbol. Some would have acted as centres of trade and administration for a manor.

Castles can take several forms. The most common is the motte-and-bailey which consists of a motte (a mound) – surmounted by a keep or tower – connected to a bailey, an outer enclosure where the barracks and workshops were located. Other types of castle in Cheshire are ringworks and fortified manor houses. Ringworks are similar to motte-and-bailey castles but lack the motte; although contemporary with motte-and-baileys, they are an uncommon form of fortification. A ringwork may have been built rather than a motte-and-bailey because the soil was too thin to provide a proper motte or simply because of the preference of the builder. A fortified manor house was the administrative centre of a manor – a division of land in medieval England – and was usually the home of the local lord. Fortified manor houses are considered castles because they often had battlements or crenellations.

Due to its border with Wales, Cheshire played an important role in defending England against the Welsh. Many castles were built along the border, and 8 of the 20 castles in Cheshire are within 4 miles (6.4 km) of the Welsh border. Castles along the border were constructed when the Norman invasion of Wales was slowed by Welsh opposition; when conquest was swift, there was less need for fortifications. Compared to north Wales, relatively few castles are found in Cheshire since many, such as Holt Castle, were built on the western side of the River Dee. Most of these castles were motte-and-baileys and were originally of turf and timber construction, although they were sometimes later replaced by stone structures if a long-term castle was needed. Away from the borders, baronial castles were built in Cheshire and were a status symbol. The castles in Cheshire were built over a period of several centuries, with the earliest in 1070 and the latest in the 15th century. Most, 12 out of 20, were built between 1070 and the end of the 12th century. Of the three castles in Cheshire known to have been built after the 13th century, they are either tower houses or fortified manor houses; this type of structure was more important as a feudal residence than a military structure and reflects the national trend of castles after the 13th century being used as a symbol of authority rather than primarily military.

Most of the castles are in a ruinous state, having been abandoned after they fulfilled their military purpose. The remains are often protected by law: 11 sites are Scheduled Monuments, and 5 are listed buildings. A Scheduled Ancient Monument is a "nationally important" archaeological site or historic building, given protection against unauthorised change. As well as the 20 known castles in Cheshire, historian Mike Salter in his 2001 gazetteer of the castles in Cheshire and Lancashire lists Mud Hill in Coddington (53.091352°N 2.817631°W) and Peel Hall near Manley (53.221258°N 2.7497°W) as possible sites of castles.

== List of castles ==
Castle	Location	Type	Constructed	Scheduled Monument	Notes
Aldford Castle	Aldford; 53.1304°N 2.8698°W	Motte-and-bailey and shell keep	12th century	Yes	The motte, which survives to a height of 5.2 m (17 ft), is surrounded by a 10 m (33 ft) wide and 2.4 m (7 ft 10 in) deep ditch. The bailey is surrounded by a 2 m (6 ft 7 in) deep 18 m (59 ft) wide ditch, and is triangular in shape, covering an area of 4,250 m^{2} (45,700 sq ft). A later manor house was probably built on the motte.
Beeston Castle	Beeston; 53.127894°N 2.690455°W	Enclosure	1220s	Yes	Beeston Castle is on a crag 90 m (300 ft) above the surrounding countryside, at the northern end of the Peckforton Hills. The site is strategically strong because of its natural defences and overlooks the surrounding area for miles. It has an outer and inner bailey and no motte; this, coupled with strong defensive walls and gatehouse and no inner keep means it is an enclosure type castle. The inner bailey is surrounded by a sheer drop on three sides, and is protected by a 9 m (30 ft) deep ditch on the fourth side. The curtain wall of the outer bailey was 2 m (6 ft 7 in) thick. It was built in the 1220s by Ranulf de Blondeville, 6th Earl of Chester, and is similar in design to Bolingbroke Castle in Lincolnshire which he built around the same time. The castle passed into the possession of the Crown when John le Scot, Blondeville's heir, died in 1237. Beeston Castle was involved in the Second Barons' War (1264–1265) when it was captured by Prince Edward from Simon de Montfort, 6th Earl of Leicester. In the English Civil War it was captured by the Parliamentarians and then recaptured by the Royalists before being slighted in 1646 to render its defences useless. The castle is protected as a Grade I listed building and is now a museum.
Bradlegh Old Hall	Burtonwood; 53.4399°N 2.6463°W	Fortified manor house	15th century	Yes	The hall was built as a manor house in the 15th century with a moat and a fortified gatehouse. It was owned by the Legh family who owned Lyme Park. Additions were made in the 16th century, and the structure was encased in brick in the 18th century. The ruinous gateway, which was built in 1460, is a Grade II* listed building. Only the gateway and moat survive from the 15th century hall.
Chester Castle	Chester; 53.185091°N 2.890729°W	Motte-and-bailey (also a possible ringwork)	1070	Yes	Chester Castle was built in 1070 by William the Conqueror. Originally a motte-and-bailey castle constructed from timber and turf, it was rebuilt in stone in the 12th century. The castle underwent many periods of construction, with an outer bailey, new towers along the inner bailey, new structures within the castle walls, and a new gatehouse all added in the 13th century, during the Welsh Wars. Chester Castle was given by William I to the Earls of Chester and it served as the administrative centre of the earldom. It passed into the possession of the Crown on the extinction of the line of earls in 1237. After the 13th century, most expenditure on the castle was to maintain it rather than aggrandise it as happened with other castles such as Warwick Castle. When the medieval castle was destroyed by fire in the 18th century, only the Agricola Tower survived. The tower (also known as Caesar's Tower) and the curtain walls are Grade I listed buildings.
Doddington Castle^{[A]}	Doddington; 53.019424°N 2.434224°W	Tower house	1364–1403	No	Doddington Castle was built in 1364–1403 by Sir John Delves. He acquired a licence to crenellate and erected a free-standing tower separate from his mansion. In the 17th century, the tower was incorporated into a series of domestic houses. When these houses were demolished in 1777, the tower was retained as a landscape feature. The castle is three storeys high and made from sandstone. It is protected as a Grade I listed building.
Dodleston Castle	Dodleston; 53.140902°N 2.954703°W	Motte-and-bailey	Medieval	Yes	The 3.3 m (11 ft) high motte is surrounded by a 2.3 m (7 ft 7 in) deep ditch. The bailey, to the west of the motte, is surrounded by a rampart and ditch; the ditch is 12 m (39 ft) wide and is up to 2.4 m (7 ft 10 in) deep, while the rampart survives to a height of 1.5 m (4 ft 11 in). Dodlestone Castle was the seat of the Boydell family. The site has been damaged by landscaping and construction work. A later mansion was built on the site for the Manley family of Lache, and this building was probably used in the English Civil War as Sir William Brereton's headquarters during the Siege of Chester.
Frodsham Castle	Frodsham; 53.29236°N 2.729414°W	Unknown	1070	No	Frodsham Castle is located at the foot of Overton Hill in the western part of the town of Frodsham. It guarded a pass between the hill and Frodsham Marsh. The castle was probably built by Hugh Lupus, the first Earl of Chester. In 1355, Frodsham Castle was recorded as requiring repair. The Norman castle collapsed in the 14th century and was replaced by a fortified manor house. This was destroyed by fire in 1654. Although there are no visible traces of the structure, some of the foundations were incorporated into the cellars of Castle Park, a building constructed on the site in 1721.
Halton Castle	Halton, Runcorn; 53.332844°N 2.694361°W	Motte-and-bailey	c. 1070	Yes	Halton Castle is on the summit of Halton Hill and overlooks the estuary of the River Mersey. Halton Castle was probably built in the late 11th century for Nigel of Cotentin, the first Baron of Halton. The first timber castle was replaced by the current stone structure in the 12th century. The castle passed into the possession of the crown when the 15th baron, Henry Bolingbroke, ascended to the throne as Henry IV. Although used as a prison and centre of administration in the Tudor period, by 1609 the structure was in a state of disrepair. The castle was used in the English Civil War, but afterwards its defences were dismantled. After that, the castle was allowed to deteriorate. The ruins of the castle are protected as a Grade I listed building.
Kingsley Castle^{[B]}	Manley; 53.2558°N 2.6998°W	Motte	Medieval, possibly Norman	Yes	The motte survives to a height of 2.8 m (9 ft 2 in) and is 23 m (75 ft) in diameter. There is no trace of a surrounding ditch or a bailey associated with the motte. There are the remains of a summerhouse on the side of the motte, not contemporary with the medieval castle.
Macclesfield Castle^{[C]}	Macclesfield; 53.258926°N 2.12421°W	Fortified manor house	1398	No	Located in the town of Macclesfield, the castle was built by John de Macclesfield in the late 14th–early 15th century, probably because of the crisis towards the end of Richard II's reign. The castle was square with projecting wings, and measured 130 by 36 metres (142 by 39 yd). After de Macclesfield died in 1422, the castle passed through the possession of two families of earls, one of which was the Earl of Buckingham's family, after which the castle became known as Buckingham Palace. It was altered in the 15th century, and by 1585 was ruinous. By the 20th century, only the porch was still standing, and this was demolished in 1932 and shops and cottages were built on the site.
Malpas Castle^{[D]}	Malpas; 53.019549°N 2.765804°W	Motte	Probable 12th century	Yes	Malpas Castle is in the Broxton Hills and was built for the Barons of Malpas. It was part of a series of defences along the Welsh border, and was linked with Aldford and Shocklach castles (Shocklach was also built by the Barons of Malpas). Its links with Alford and Shocklach castles and the Barons of Malpas means it was probably built in the 12th century. The motte survives to 3.7 metres (12 ft) in height and is 37 m (40 yd) in diameter and is surrounded by a ditch. Although there is no sign of a bailey, there was probably one to the south of the motte; the site today is heavily disturbed and covered in grass.
Nantwich Castle	Nantwich; 53.066452°N 2.521413°W	Unknown	Before 1180	No	Nantwich Castle lay in ruins by 1485. No trace survives, and Castle Street and Mill Street are on the site.
Newhall Tower	Newhall; 53.0046°N 2.5820°W	Tower house	c. 1227	No	Newhall Tower was probably built in 1227 for the Audley family when they gained ownership of the land, but it is first documented in 1275. It was still in use in 1363, but was ruinous by the late 16th century. The site of the castle is uncertain, but a series of earthworks with a central mound and a square ditch is the likeliest location.
Northwich Castle	Northwich; 53.259°N 2.518°W	Motte	Probable 12th century	No	The castle is first referred to in the 1190s, and again in 1278. Excavations have not revealed the location of the castle.
Oldcastle	Oldcastle; 52.991681°N 2.792876°W	Unknown	13th century	No	The first documented evidence of Oldcastle comes from 1288. By 1485, the castle was ruinous. Little is known about the castle, although it was surrounded by two defensive ditches. One ditch began silting up in the 13th century and was filled in during the late 14th–early 15th centuries, while the other was in use until the 15th century.
Pulford Castle	Pulford; 53.121069°N 2.933267°W	Motte-and-bailey	Late 12th century	Yes	Pulford Castle is first documented in 1190–1220. Having been built by the Ormesbee family, the castle was given to the Pulford family in 1245. In 1403, Henry IV ordered Sir Thomas le Grosvenor to hold the castle against Owain Glyndŵr. The motte is surrounded by a ditch apart from in the south, where Pulford Brook forms part of the defences. The motte survives to a height of 3 m (9.8 ft) and measures 11 by 9 m (36 by 30 ft) at the summit. In 1313, a jury of the Chester county court found that the lord of Little Caldy (Wirral) held that manor by the service of 'palisading' (i.e. repairing the wooden defences) of Robert de Pulford's castle at Pulford.
Shipbrook Castle	Davenham; 53.235692°N 2.489153°W	Unknown	11th–12th centuries	No	The exact location of Shipbrook Castle is uncertain, but it is thought to be on Castle Hill near Shipbrook Bridge. During the Welsh Wars, baronial castles were built as a form of defence, and Shipbrook Castle was one of these. It was demolished in around 1850.
Shocklach Castle	Shocklach; 53.051612°N 2.843735°W	Fortified manor house	1100	Yes	Shocklach Castle is on the edge of a steep ravine. The earliest fortification on the site is a motte surrounded by a ditch; the motte survives to a height of 4 m (13 ft) from the bottom of the ditch. Although there is no bailey connected to the motte, there is a D-shaped enclosure 30 m (98 ft) east of the motte. The enclosure near the motte was the site of a fortified manor house and was surrounded by a moat; it was the successor fortification from the earlier motte and it thought to have been built around 1100 for the Barons of Malpas. Shocklach Castle was part of a series of defences along the Welsh border, and was linked with Aldford and Malpas castles.
Shotwick Castle	Shotwick; 53.226871°N 2.974293°W	Motte-and-bailey	Probably pre-1093	Yes	It is located on a steep escarpment which was on the shore of the Dee estuary when the castle was built; it is protected by streams on two sides and guarded a ford over the River Dee. The motte is an irregular hexagon and measures 40 m (130 ft) north-south and 20 m (66 ft) east-west. A kidney-shaped bailey next to the motte measures 80 m (260 ft) north-south and 38 m (125 ft) east-west. A ditch surrounds the bailey varying between 15 and 29 m (49 and 95 ft) wide and 2.2 to 3.8 m (7 ft 3 in to 12 ft 6 in) deep. Shotwick Castle was probably built by Hugh Lupus, 1st Earl of Chester, in the late 11th century, although the castle was first documented in 1260. It was used as border defence against the Welsh until peace was achieved in 1281. After this, it fell out of use as a military castle, and became part of a royal manor and game park for Edward III. Shotwick Castle was ruinous by 1621 and demolished in 1756. The castle survives as earthworks but has been damaged by treasure hunters and ploughing, and is now used as pasture.
Warrington Castle^{[E]}	Warrington; 53.392°N 2.576°W	Motte-and-bailey	Medieval, possibly Norman	No	Warrington Castle is on a slight prominence 230 m (250 yd) north of the bank of the River Mersey, overlooking a ford and its approaches. The motte was surrounded by a ditch and oval in shape, measuring 49 by 39 m (161 by 128 ft) and survives to a height of 2.7 m (8 ft 10 in) in 1908. The bailey was defended by a rampart and ditch. It was probably built in the Norman period, and the residence of the Lords of the Manor of Warrington until they moved to Bewsey Hall in Burtonwood. Warrington Castle was the largest motte-and-bailey castle in Lancashire. By 1587, the castle was in a state of decay. Although the site was reused in the English Civil War, it otherwise slips out of records after 1587 and was probably left derelict. No trace of the castle remains, and the site is occupied by a park.

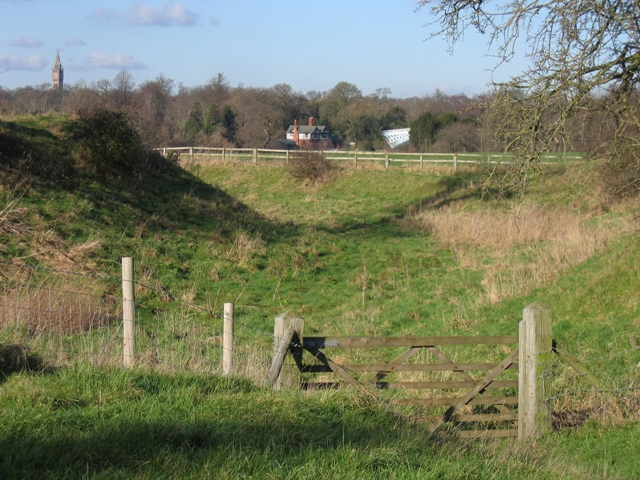
Earthworks are all that remains of the 12th century Aldford Castle

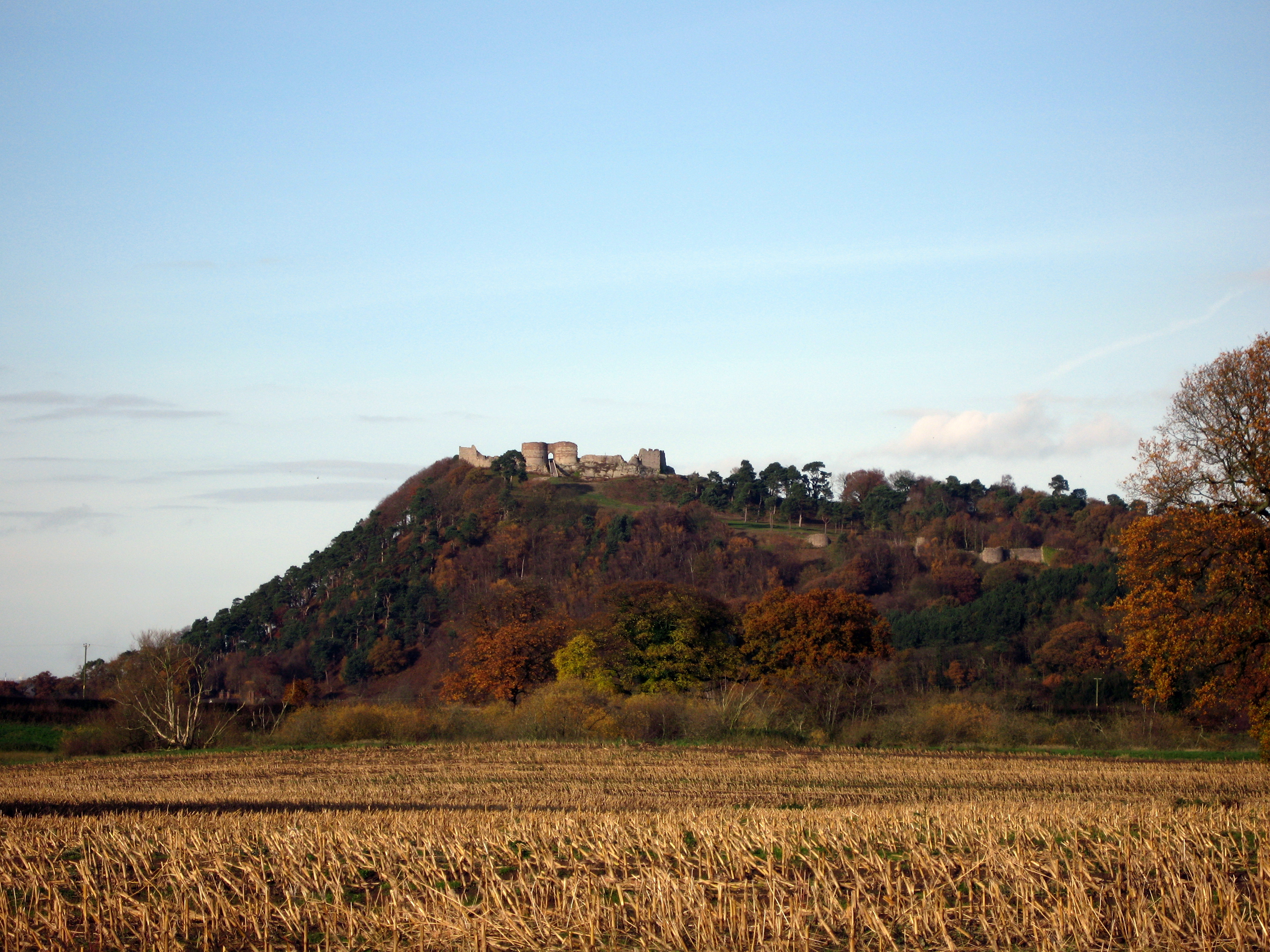
Beeston Castle viewed from the south, built on a rocky summit 110 m (360 ft) above the Cheshire Plain

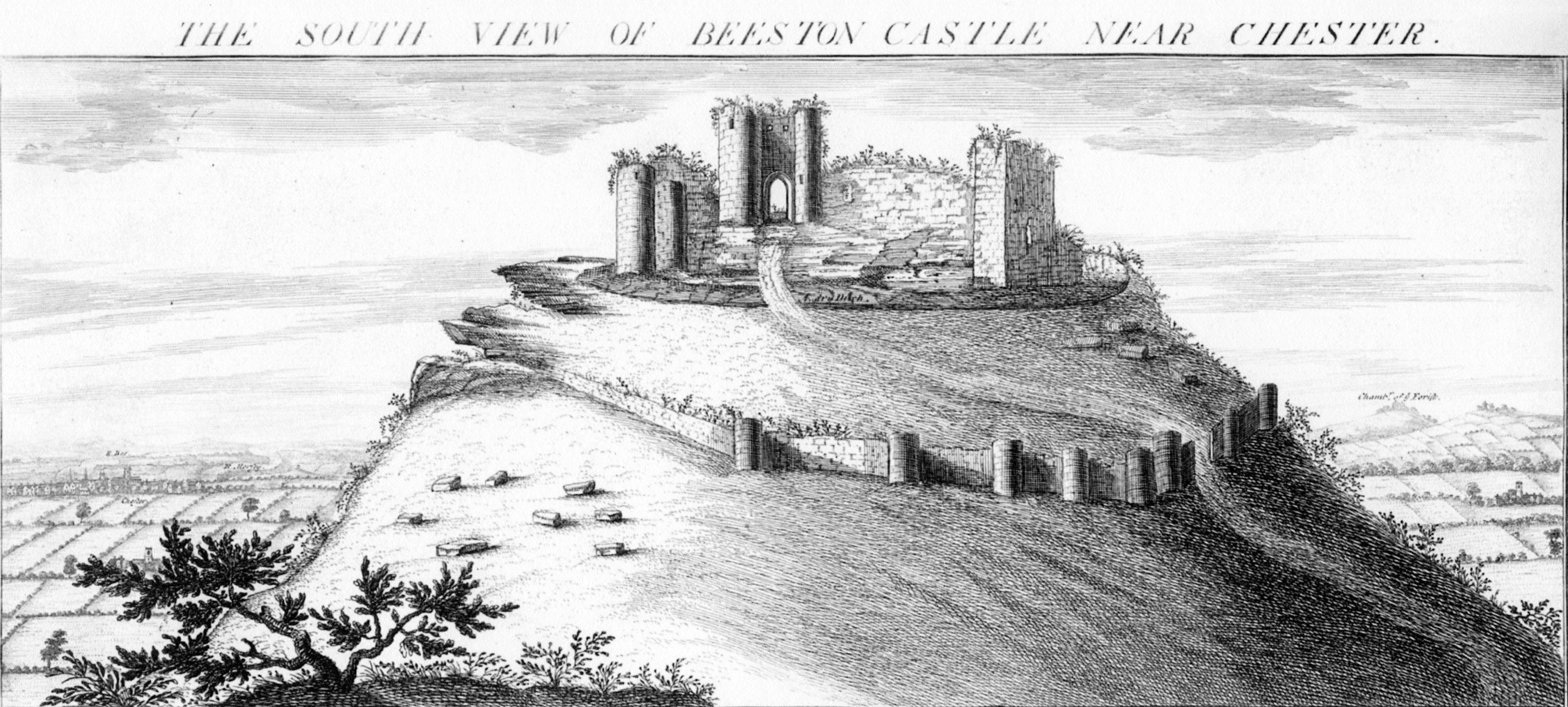
Engraving of Beeston Castle in 1727 by the Buck Brothers, showing Beeston Castle from the south. By this time, the castle defences had been dismantled to render it strategically useless

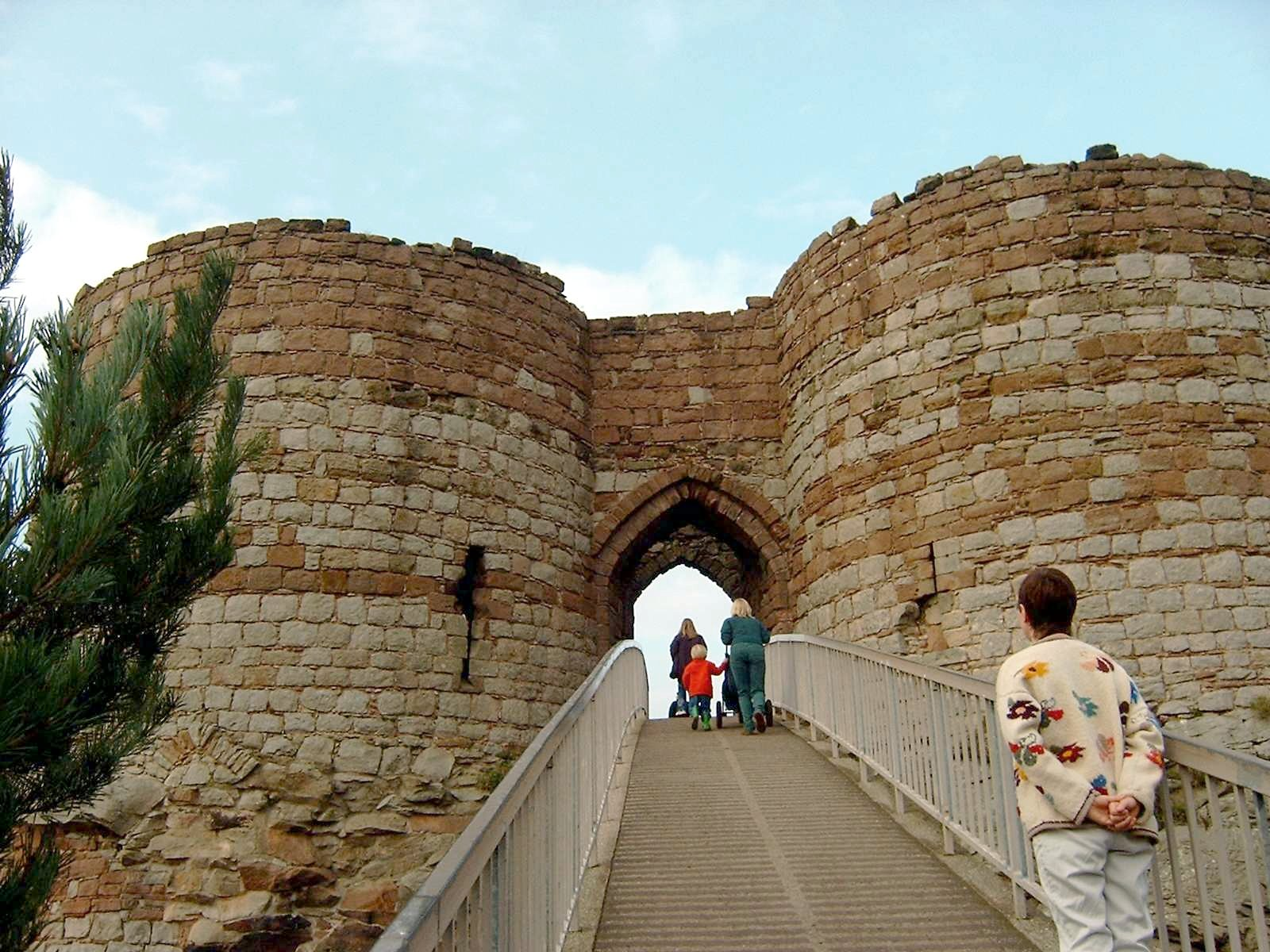
Beeston Castle gateway to the main keep

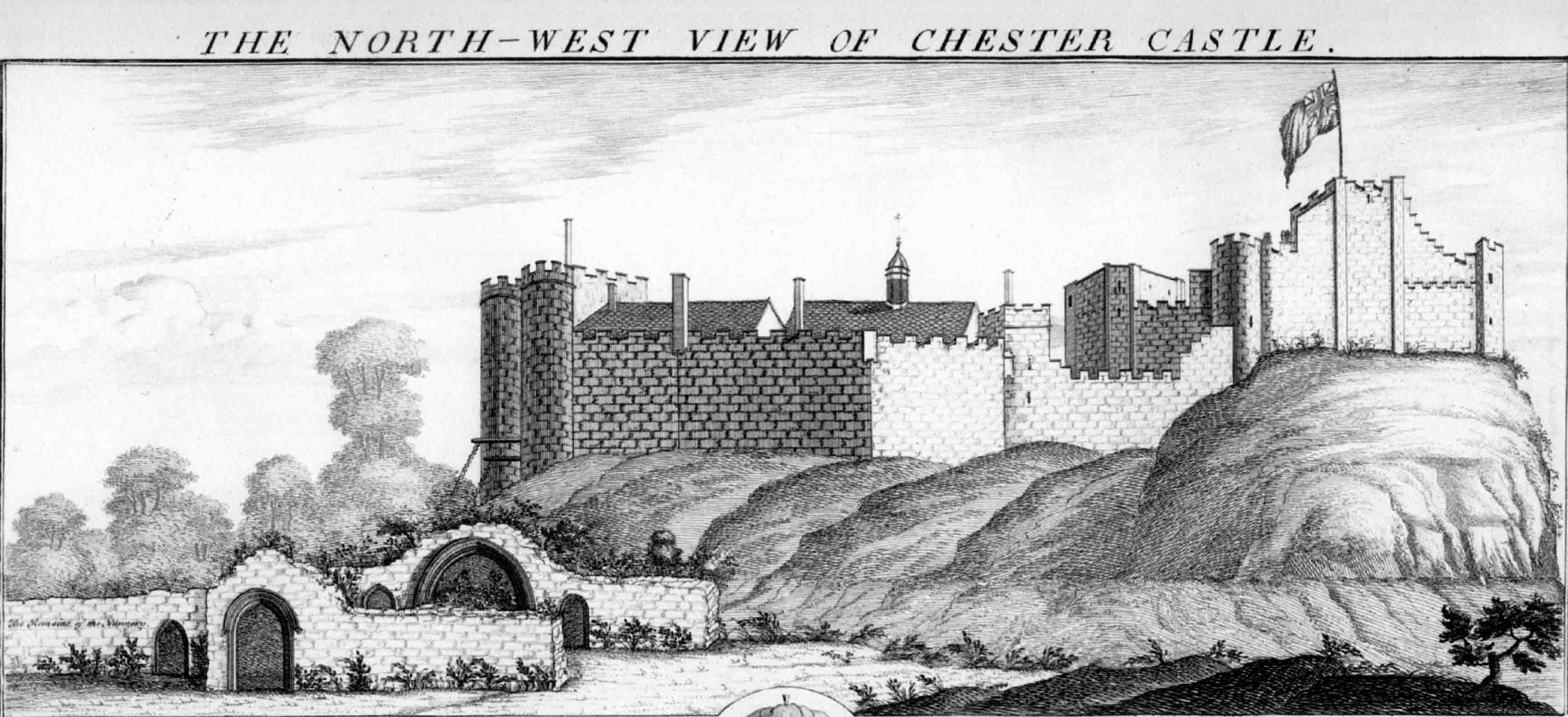
An engraving by Buck Brothers of Chester Castle in 1747

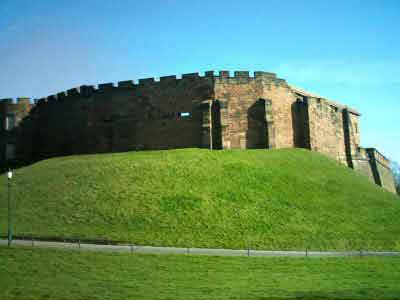
The curtain walls of Chester Castle

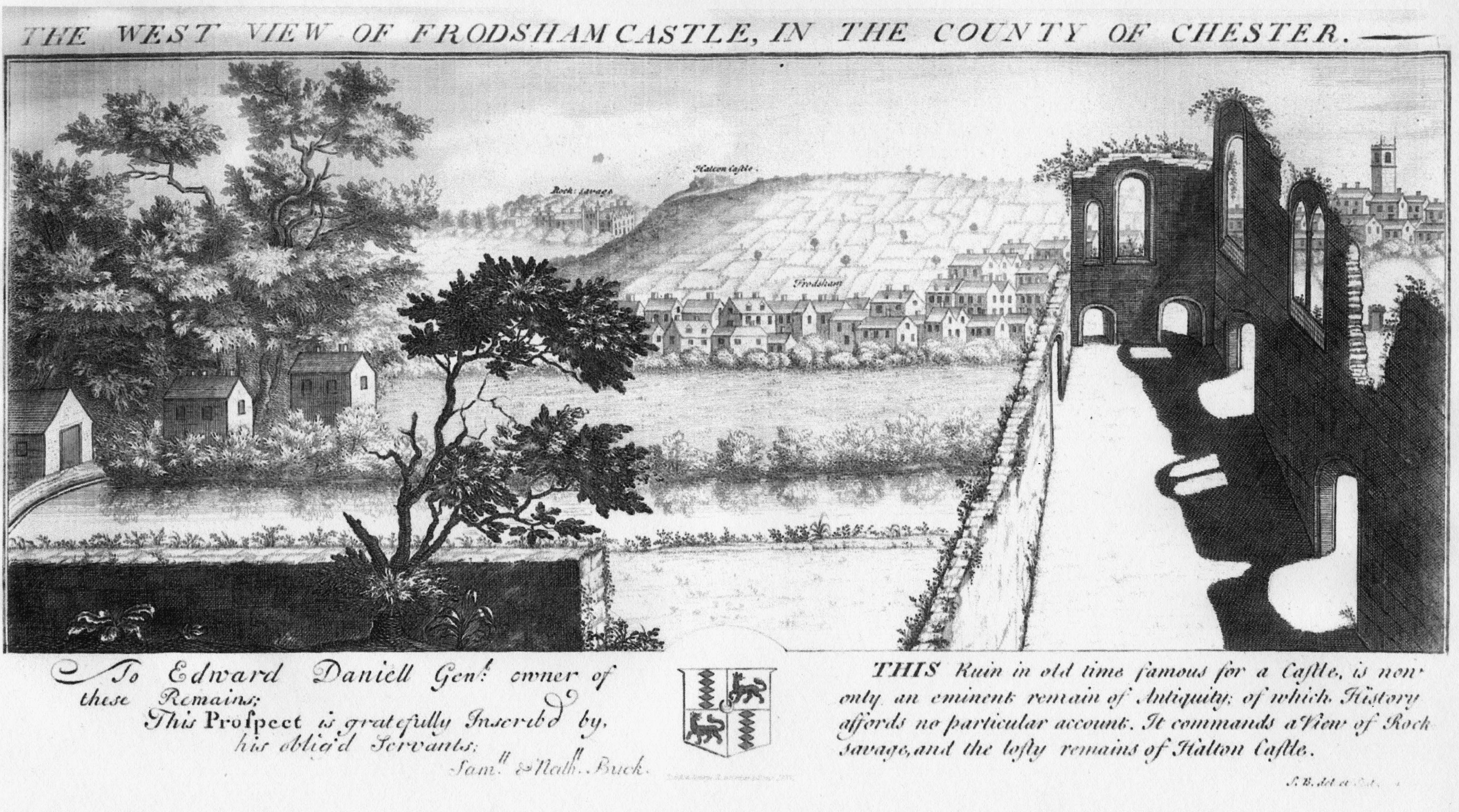
Ruins of Frodsham Castle in the 18th century

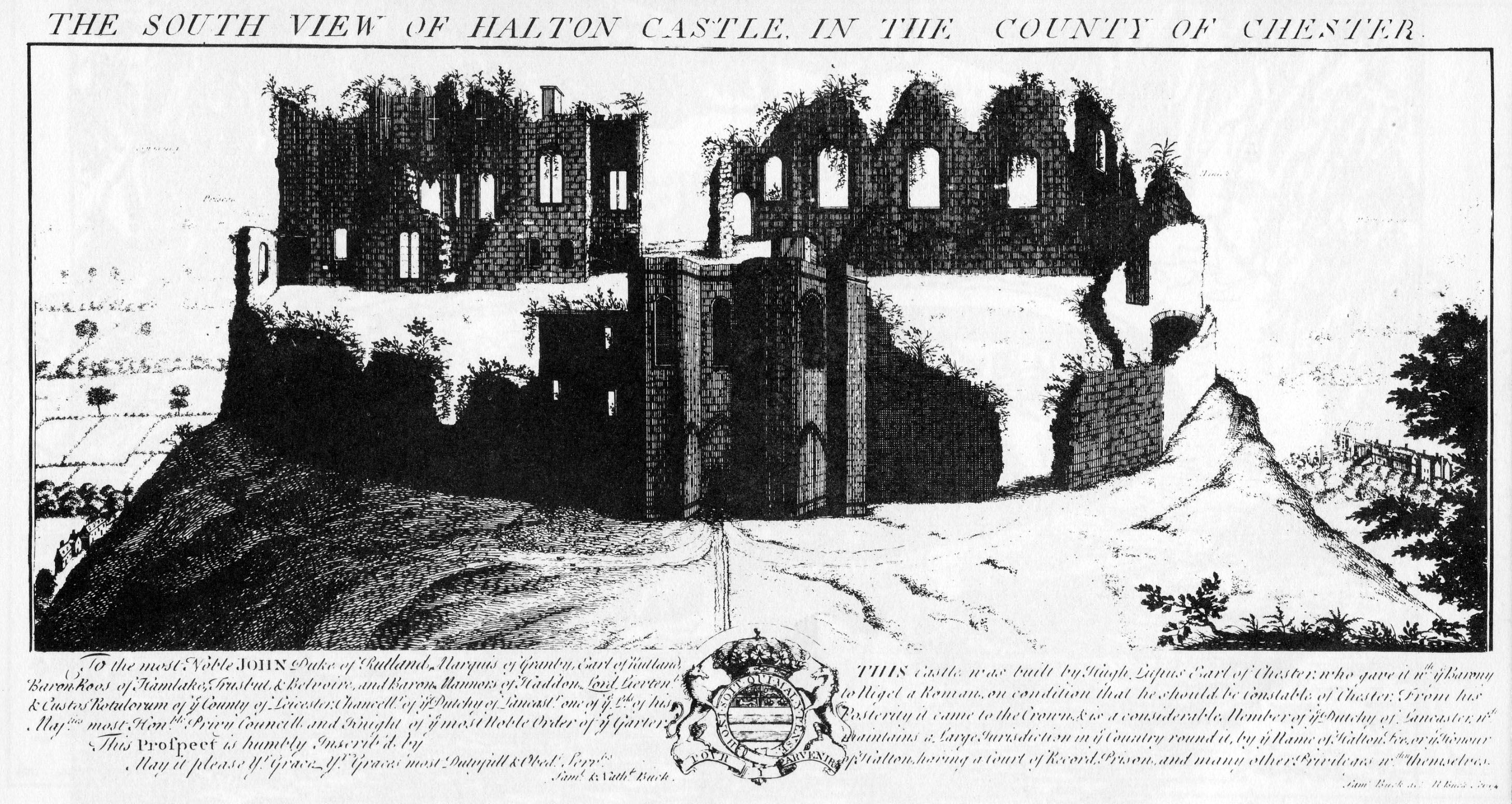
Halton Castle in 1727. Engraving by the Buck brothers

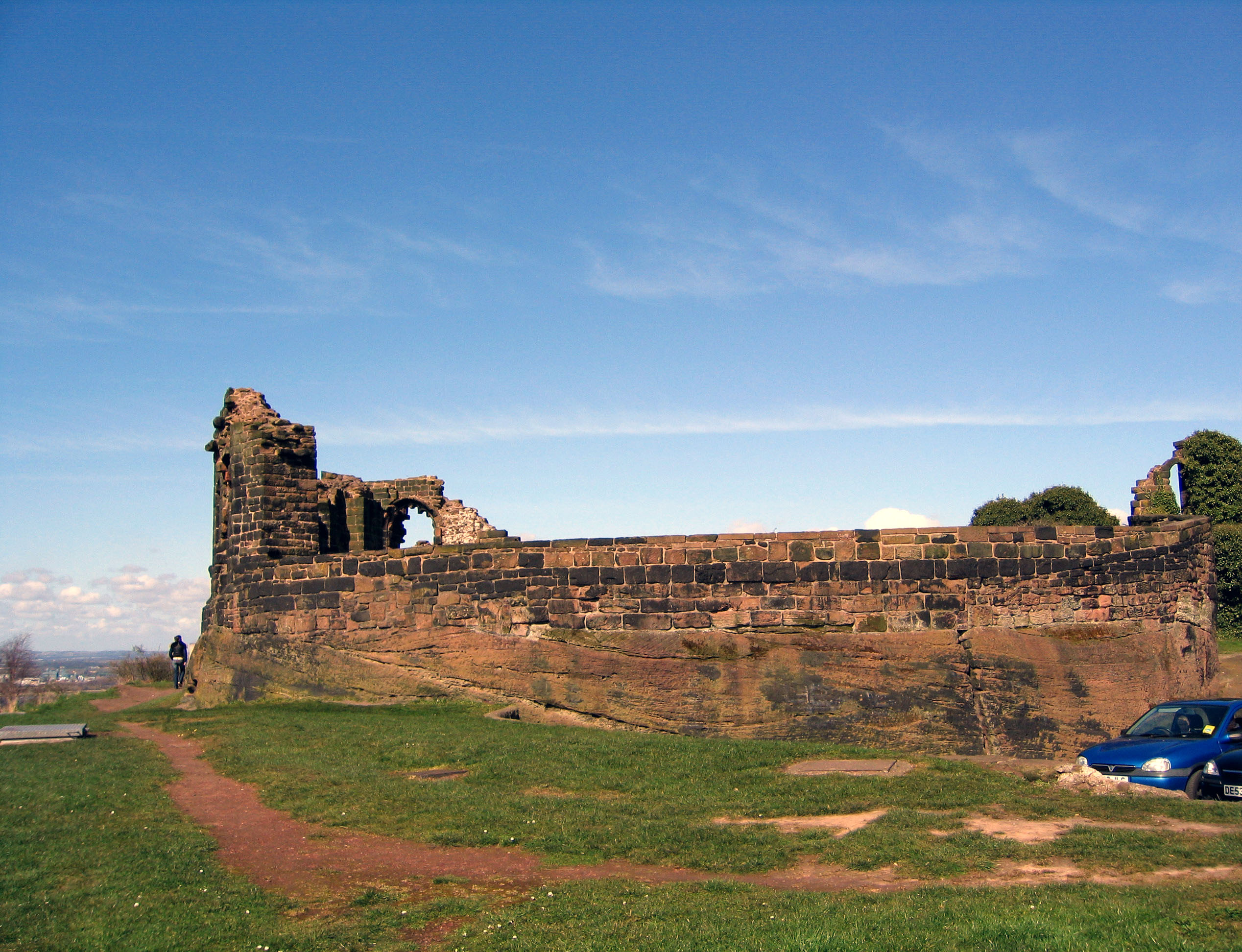
Part of the ruins of Halton Castle in 2006

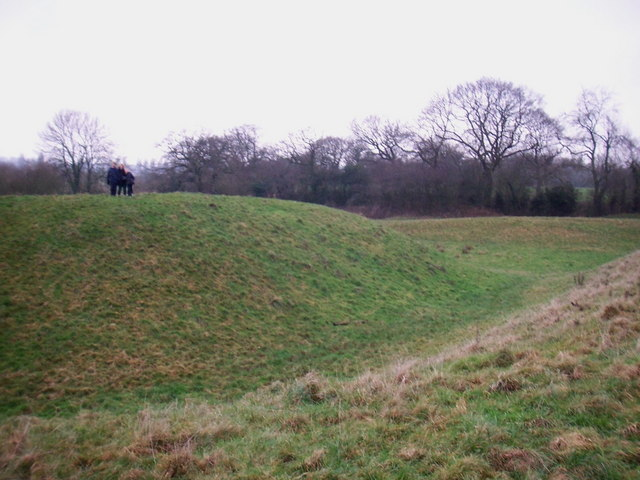
Only earthworks survive of Shotwick Castle

== Alternative names ==
Some of the castles in the list have more than one name. Where this is the case, the alternative names are listed here.

^{A} Also known as Delves Hall
^{B} Also known as Castle Cob
^{C} Also known as Buckingham Palace and Buckingham Castle
^{D} Also known as Castle Hill
^{E} Also known as The Mount, The Motte, and Moat Hill

== See also ==
- List of castles in England
- List of castles in Greater Manchester
- List of scheduled monuments in Cheshire (1066–1539)
- Mow Cop Castle – an 18th-century folly
- Peckforton Castle – a 19th-century house
- Welsh Marches
