= Rachel Swallow =

Archaeologist

Rachel Swallow FSA

Academic background
- Education: University of Chester; University of Liverpool; Birmingham Polytechnic
- Thesis: Cheshire Castles in Context (2015)
- Doctoral advisor: Howard Williams; Peter Gaunt

Academic work
- Discipline: Archaeology
- Sub-discipline: Castellology; Landscape archaeology; Medieval archaeology
- Institutions: University of Chester; University of Liverpool
- Website: Official website

Rachel Swallow FSA is an archaeologist specialising in the study of landscapes and castles. She was elected a Fellow of the Society of Antiquaries of London in 2018. Swallow studied at Birmingham Polytechnic and the University of Liverpool before completing a PhD at the University of Chester in 2015. She is visiting research fellow and guest lecturer at the University of Chester and honorary fellow at the University of Liverpool.

== Education ==
Swallow studied at Birmingham Polytechnic, where she completed a Bachelor of Arts in foreign languages for business. She went on to study at the University of Liverpool, completing a Master of Arts in landscape, heritage and society in 2000 and then the University of Chester, where she undertook a Doctor of Philosophy. Swallow completed her doctoral research in 2015 and was supervised by Howard Williams and Peter Gaunt with mentoring from Stewart Ainsworth on landscape archaeology; her thesis was titled Cheshire Castles in Context.

== Career ==
Swallow began a career in business management before taking a master's degree in landscape, heritage and society and pursuing archaeology. She began working in the University of Chester's history department in 2000, straight after completing her MA. Swallow was the first staff visiting lecturer and continued lecturing while researching her PhD. At the same time, she also held several other teaching positions and began publishing her research. Between 2003 and 2007 Swallow was a tutor at Keele University, teaching students about archaeology and landscape studies. Swallow collaborated with Robert Liddiard to write the English Heritage guidebook for Beeston Castle in Cheshire. It was published in 2007 as part of a new scheme of guidebooks produced for the organisation and replacing the 1995 guidebook.

In 2009, Swallow began tutoring at Burton Manor College, again teaching about archaeology and the landscape. This role continued until the college closed in 2011. While researching her PhD and shortly afterwards, Swallow published several articles on castles in Cheshire. These articles included a study of the landscape archaeology of Aldford Castle, investigations at Shocklach Castle, and a survey of Dodleston Castle, all in the Cheshire History Journal. Between 2015 and 2016, she also published two papers in The Archaeological Journal summarising key results from her PhD.

Swallow was elected a Fellow of the Society of Antiquaries of London in March 2018. The following year she was elected to the council of the Royal Archaeological Institute. Swallow joined the University of Liverpool in 2020 as a Data Technician and Temporary Research Assistant in the Department of Archaeology; in that role she contributes to 'The Human Remains: Digital Library' project. From 2020 to 2021, Swallow was Chair of the Chester Archaeological Society. Swallow participated in Channel 4 series The Great British Dig when they excavated at West Derby.

== Selected publications ==
Swallow has published articles and chapters in numerous venues. This includes new interpretations of Beeston Castle (published in The Archaeological Journal and Château Gaillard); Anglo-Norman castles in the Irish Sea Cultural Zone and the Anglo-Welsh border (also published in The Archaeological Journal); and Caernarfon Castle's landscape setting and architecture (published in Archaeologia Cambrensis, Château Gaillard, and Britain and Its Neighbours).

- Liddiard, Robert; McGuicken [Swallow], Rachel (2007). Beeston Castle. English Heritage.
- McGuicken [Swallow], Rachel (2010). "Castle in context? Redefining the significance of Beeston Castle, Cheshire". Journal of the Chester Archaeological Society. 81: 65–82. doi:10.5284/1070377
- Swallow, Rachel (2012). "Landscape of Power: Aldford castle, Cheshire". Cheshire History. 52: 5–28.
  Runner-up in the British Association for Local History Awards 2014
- Swallow, Rachel (2014). "Gateways to Power: The Castles of Ranulf III of Chester and Llywelyn the Great of Gwynedd". The Archaeological Journal. 171 (1): 289–311. doi:10.1080/00665983.2014.11078268. S2CID 162382565.
- Swallow, Rachel (2016). "Cheshire Castles of the Irish Sea Cultural Zone". The Archaeological Journal. 173 (2): 288–341. doi:10.1080/00665983.2016.1191279. S2CID 163766715.
- Swallow, Rachel (2018). "Hilltop castles in a medieval landscape: Beeston and Buckton, Cheshire, England". Château Gaillard: Études de castellologie médiévale. 28: 271–282.
- Swallow, Rachel (2019). "Living the dream: the legend, lady and landscape of Caernarfon Castle, Gwynedd, North Wales". Archaeologia Cambrensis. 168: 153–196.
- Swallow, Rachel (2021), "The forests and elite residences of the earls of Chester in Cheshire", Anglo-Norman Studies, 43: 15–38, doi:10.2307/j.ctv1q16rh1.7, S2CID 236261883
- Swallow, Rachel (2021). "Cherchez la femme: a Fresh Interdisciplinary and Multi-Period Approach to Understanding Gender, Place and Space at Caernarfon Castle in Gwynedd, Wales". Château Gaillard: Études de castellologie médiévale. 29.
- Swallow, Rachel (2021). "Ring-fencing the gardinum? European romance to British reality of the thirteenth-century Caernarfon Castle garden and park". Britain and Its Neighbours: Cultural Contacts and Exchanges in Medieval and Early Modern Europe. pp. 121–139. doi:10.4324/9780429324741-7-8. S2CID 233568112.
