= Green Paddocks =

- Location in Cheshire
- 53.1320°N 2.9310°W
- Location: Pulford, Cheshire, England
- OS grid reference: SJ 378 598

History
- Built: 1872
- Built for: 1st Duke of Westminster

Site notes
- Architect: John Douglas

Listed Building – Grade II
- Designated: 12 July 1973
- Reference no.: 1136635

Green Paddocks (originally The Limes Farmhouse) is a house in Pulford, Cheshire, England. It is recorded in the National Heritage List for England as a designated Grade II listed building.

== History and critique ==
The house was built in 1872 for Hugh Grosvenor (then the 3rd Marquess of Westminster and later the 1st Duke of Westminster), and designed by the Chester architect John Douglas. In the Buildings of England series, the architectural historian Nikolaus Pevsner states that it is "employed with inventiveness and virtuosity" and "meticulously detailed" . In his biography of Douglas, Edward Hubbard states that it is "remarkable ... for the care and expense lavished on it".

== Architecture ==
Green Paddocks is constructed in brown brick with red tile roofs; it has two storeys and attics. The entrance front is symmetrical in three bays, with the central bay projecting forwards. The central bay has an arched doorway with a twelve-panelled door. Above this is panelled brickwork and a mullioned window, and over this is a pargetted gable. The lateral bays have mullioned windows in both lower storeys, and in the attics. Above these are shaped gables. The roof is steeply hipped, and at the rear is a small turret-like roof.

Internally, great care has been given to detail, particularly in the staircase, the doors, and the fireplace in the front room. Some of the panelled mahogany doors had been brought in from a demolished Victorian hotel.

== See also ==
- Listed buildings in Pulford
- List of houses and associated buildings by John Douglas
