= Frodsham Castle =

Castle in England

Coordinates: 53.2926°N 2.7309°W

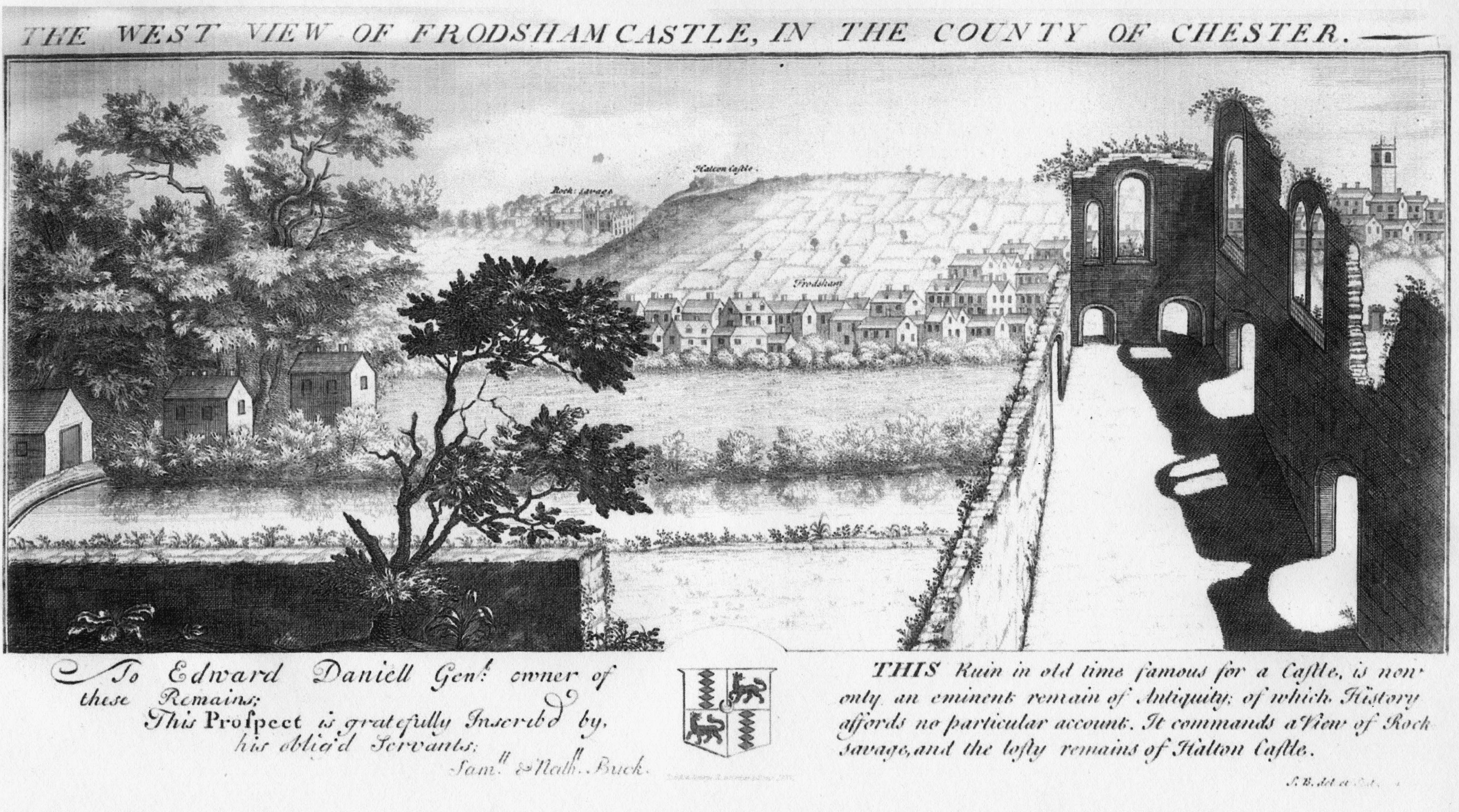
Ruins of Frodsham Castle in the 18th century

Frodsham Castle was in the market town of Frodsham, Cheshire, England (grid reference SJ514775).

Initially it served a military purpose, it then became a manor house and a gaol. After being damaged in the Civil War it was replaced by new house, Park Place.

== Location ==
The castle stood on rising ground at the foot of Overton Hill at the western end of the town of Frodsham and guarded the narrow pass between Frodsham Marsh and the hill.

== History ==
It is likely that the castle was built by Hugh Lupus, Earl of Chester around 1070. This was probably a timber structure which completely collapsed during the 14th century. A new castle was built on the site which was occupied by the bailiff who administered the site on behalf of the Lord of the manor, who was usually the Earl of Chester or the sovereign. It is thought that the building was more a fortified manor house than a castle because there is evidence of only minimal fortification and there is no record of any attempt to obtain permission to crenellate. Nevertheless, the walls had "enormous thickness". It later became the gaol of the Manor.

In the early 17th century Sir Thomas Savage of Clifton purchased from the Crown the Manor, the Lordship and the Castle of Frodsham; these had previously belonged to the Frodsham family. Sir Thomas died in 1635 to be succeeded by his son, John, who four years later inherited the title of Earl Rivers. During the Civil War, John Savage was living in the nearby mansion of Rocksavage. He was a Royalist and his house was damaged by Parliamentary forces. He died in Frodsham Castle in 1654 but while his corpse was still in the castle awaiting burial, the building was destroyed in a fire.

The ruins were bought by John Daniels of Daresbury and then in about 1750 by Daniel Ashley, a local solicitor. His son, Robert Wainwright Ashley, who was also a lawyer, demolished the ruins and built a house, Park Place. Part of the foundations of the castle formed the cellars of this house.

== Present state ==
The site is now occupied by a larger house, Castle Park House which is owned and administered by Cheshire West and Chester Council.

== See also ==
- List of castles in Cheshire
