= List of scheduled monuments in Cheshire (1066–1539) =

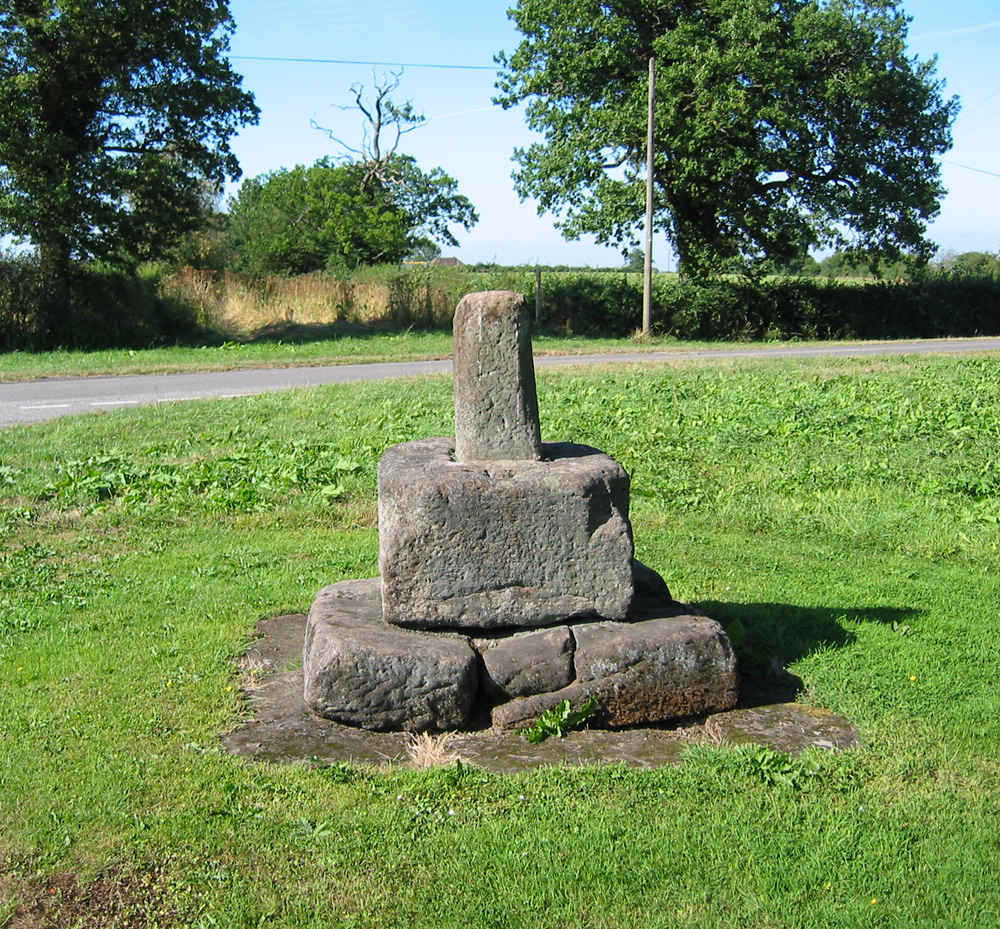
Woodhey wayside cross

There are over two hundred scheduled monuments in Cheshire, a county in North West England, which date from the Neolithic period to the middle of the 20th century. This list includes the scheduled monuments in Cheshire between the years 1066 and 1539, the period accepted by Revealing Cheshire's Past as the medieval period.

A scheduled monument is a nationally important archaeological site or monument which is given legal protection by being placed on a list (or "schedule") by the Secretary of State for Culture, Media and Sport; English Heritage takes the leading role in identifying such sites. The current legislation supporting this is the Ancient Monuments and Archaeological Areas Act 1979. The term "monument" can apply to the whole range of archaeological sites, and they are not always visible above ground. Such sites have to have been deliberately constructed by human activity. They range from prehistoric standing stones and burial sites, through Roman remains and medieval structures such as castles and monasteries, to later structures such as industrial sites and buildings constructed for the World Wars or the Cold War.

At least 129 scheduled monuments, over half of the total in Cheshire, date from the medieval period. The most frequently found monuments are moats or moated sites, of which there are 55. These are followed by the remains of crosses, 15 of which are churchyard crosses and 11 are wayside crosses, and the remains of 12 castles. There are seven deserted villages, three boundary stones, and the remains of three abbeys, two holy wells, and two halls. There are individual remains of a lime kiln, a pottery kiln, a hospital, a former chapel, a monastic grange, a tomb, an ice house and a hunting lodge. Chester city walls, the Dee Bridge and Farndon Bridge are scheduled monuments which are largely intact and continue in use today.

During the medieval period, houses were built on moated sites partly for defensive purposes but also as a sign of prestige. Cheshire contains over 200 moated sites out of more than 6,000 in England. Crosses in churchyards were used for a variety of purposes, including sites for prayer and pilgrimage, and for public proclamations. Many of them were destroyed following the Reformation and some were converted into sundials by Catholic recusants to prevent their destruction. Other standing stones were part of wayside crosses acting as guides to local abbeys, or plague stones which were used for the transfer of money and items during periods of plague. Motte and bailey castles were introduced to Britain by the Normans and were used in Cheshire to defend its agricultural resources. In many cases the monuments consist only of earthworks or foundations, and where significant structural remains are present, they are often also listed buildings.

Name	Photo	Remains	Location	Date	Description
Acton churchyard cross		Stone structure	Acton; 53.0736°N 2.5513°W	Medieval	The remains of a cross which consist of an octagonal shaft on three steps in St Mary's churchyard. In the late 17th century it was made into a sundial by the addition of a square cap with a ball finial. It is listed at Grade II.
Alderhedge Wood moat		Moat	Near Arley; 53.3174°N 2.4748°W	Medieval	A rectangular water-filled moat measuring about 54m x 55m with a fishpond and connecting channel.
Aldford Castle		Earthworks	Aldford; 53.1304°N 2.8698°W	12th century	A former motte and bailey castle, probably built in the 12th century. Only earthworks remain; both the motte and the bailey are surrounded by dry ditches.
Ashton pottery kiln		Excavation site	Ashton Hayes; 53.2169°N 2.7404°W	13th century	A potter's kiln discovered in 1933 containing fragments of pottery, mainly jugs and pitchers, dating from the 13th to the 15th century. There are now no visible surface remains.
Astbury churchyard cross		Stone structure	Newbold Astbury; 53.1508°N 2.2316°W	Medieval	The remains of a cross which consists of an octagonal gritstone base block standing on two octagonal steps in St Mary's churchyard. At a later date a sundial shaft was added. The structure is listed at Grade II.
Baddiley village		Earthworks	Baddiley; 53.0497°N 2.5863°W	Late Saxon and medieval	A deserted settlement in a shallow valley to the east of Baddiley Hall. There are signs of at least nine houses and barns on either side of small stream, which is now culverted. The Shropshire Union Canal runs through the eastern part of the site.
Barrow churchyard cross		Churchyard cross	Barrow; 53.2093°N 2.7959°W	Early 15th century	The remains of the cross consist of a square base of two steps and a tapering octagonal shaft. This was made into a sundial and it stands in the churchyard of St Bartholomew's. It is listed at Grade II.
Barrow Old Hall moated site		Earthwork	Great Sankey; 53.4013°N 2.6605°W	Medieval	This originally contained a timber framed house dating back to at least 1330. Subsequently, occupied by newer houses, it is now empty, and consists of a platform surrounded by a moat which is water-filled in three sides with a bridge crossing the western arm. Partial excavations took place in 1986–87 and 1995.
Beeston Castle		Castle ruins	Beeston; 53.1280°N 2.6919°W	1220 and later	A medieval castle built on a previous hillfort. Building started in the 1220s and it was occupied by Simon de Montfort in the Second Barons' War. It was extended in the 13th and 14th centuries but by the 16th century had become a ruin, although it was involved in the Civil War. The medieval ruins are listed at Grade I.
Belgrave moated site		Earthworks	Eaton; 53.1384°N 2.9126°W	Medieval	Formerly a manor house with a moat which was flanked on three sides by a medieval garden. By the early 17th century it was part of the Eaton estate and used as coppice woodland.
Belmont moat		Moat	Great Budworth; 53.3016°N 2.5159°W	Medieval	Formerly a grange of Norton Priory. Now consists of a water-filled moat enclosing a five-sided platform with a causeway on the west side.
Bewsey Old Hall moated site		Moat, fishpond and building platform	Burtonwood; 53.4014°N 2.6171°W	Medieval	Originally a grange, then a moated manor house. The moat, fishpond and the building platform are scheduled. Bewsey Old Hall stands on the platform.
Bostock Hall moat		Earthworks	Winsford; 53.2020°N 2.4862°W	Medieval	A rectangular waterlogged moat with an overgrown platform and a causeway.
Bradlegh Old Hall moated site		Moated site, gatehouse and fishpond	Burtonwood; 53.4399°N 2.6463°W	Medieval	A 15th-century moated hall. The moat, the fortified gatehouse and a fishpond remain. A later farmhouse now stands on the platform.
Bradley Green		Earthworks	Bradley; 53.0086°N 2.7386°W	Medieval	A medieval village now deserted. Aerial photography has shown small house platforms and a former road.
Bradley Hall moated site		Earthworks	Appleton, Warrington; 53.3565°N 2.5166°W	Medieval	A former moated manor house. Most of the platform is now occupied by a more modern farmhouse and garden.
Bruera churchyard cross		Stone structure	Bruera; 53.1392°N 2.8419°W	Medieval	This consists of the base and part of the shaft of a former standing cross, later converted into a sundial in churchyard of St Mary's Church.
Bruera moat and field system		Earthworks	Buerton; 53.1395°N 2.8425°W	Medieval	A former moated manor house surrounded by an enclosure which is subdivided into smaller enclosures forming a field system.
Capesthorne Hall and chapel		Earthworks	Siddington; 53.2497°N 2.2367°W	Medieval	The platform of the former chapel is marked by a 20th-century memorial pillar. To the southeast are earthworks remaining from the old hall.
Castle Cob motte		Earthworks	Manley; 53.2558°N 2.6998°W	Medieval	A steep-sided motte with no signs of a bailey, 23m in diameter and 2.8m high. An excavation found only black soil.
Castle Hill		Earthworks	Malpas; 53.0200°N 2.7672°W	Medieval	A mound which formerly held the keep of the castle of the Barons of Malpas. There is no sign of a bailey or a ditch. The church of St Oswald lies within the castle precinct.
Castle Hill system		Earthworks	Oldcastle; 52.9918°N 2.7935°W	Medieval	Tree-felling in 1957 on a spur overlooking Wych Brook revealed a motte with a defensive ditch system on the England-Wales border.
Castletown deserted village		Earthworks	Shocklach; 53.0558°N 2.8376°W	Medieval	A series of earthworks indicating a deserted village.
Cheersgreen Farm dam and millpond		Earthwork and pond	Peover Superior; 53.2590°N 2.3718°W	Mid 15th century	The pool was abandoned around 1750 and reinstated in 1977.
Chester city walls		City walls	Chester; 53.1923°N 2.8891°W	Roman and medieval	These consist of an almost complete circuit round the city, 2 miles (3 km) long, including four gates and several towers linked by a red sandstone wall. The north and east walls follow the Roman foundations, while the south and west walls were extended in the medieval period.
Chorley Old Hall moat and fishponds		Moat and fishponds	Alderley Edge; 53.2994°N 2.2453°W	Medieval	The moated site and three associated fishponds are scheduled. The site contains a house in two ranges, one built about 1330 and the other in the mid-16th century.
Cranshaw Hall moated site		Earthworks	Widnes; 53.3936°N 2.7272°W	Medieval	The site is mainly covered by newer buildings but the west arm of the moat can be traced on the lawn.
Darley Hall moated site		Earthworks	Little Budworth; 53.1740°N 2.5893°W	Medieval	A rectangular moated platform formerly occupied by Darley Old Hall. The moat is waterlogged and in good condition on three sides. There is now no evidence of a previously recorded drawbridge.
Dee Bridge		Bridge	Chester; 53.1855°N 2.8887°W	14th century	A sandstone bridge of seven arches crossing the River Dee. It was widened in 1826 and is a Grade I listed building.
Denhall hospital and limekiln		Earthworks and ruined walls	Neston; 53.2651°N 3.0486°W	c. 1231–34	Site of St Andrew's Hospital, a monastic hospital for travellers to Ireland; dissolved in 1496. Later occupied by a parsonage which was demolished in 1738. Now consists of earthworks and parts of ruined buildings; also present are the remains of a limekiln.
Dodleston Castle		Earthworks	Dodleston; 53.1411°N 2.9563°W	Medieval	The flat-topped motte is 3.3m high and the bailey is well-defined.
Dodleston Hall moated site		Moat	Dodleston; 53.1467°N 2.9559°W	Medieval	A moated site formerly occupied by Dodleston Hall. The moat is almost complete other than the southeast corner which is covered by buildings.
Drakelow Hall moated site		Moat and fishponds	Byley; 53.2273°N 2.4443°W	Medieval	A rectangular moat with a further moated site to the southwest and four fishponds to the northwest.
Eccleston motte		Earthworks	Eccleston; 53.1584°N 2.8800°W	Medieval (probable)	An oval mound scheduled as a motte; it is partly surrounded by a ditch and banks.
Edleston moated site		Earthworks	Edleston; 53.0529°N 2.5415°W	Medieval	A rectangular platform 50m x 30m surrounded by a dry moat with a ditch to the west and south.
Elton moated site		Earthworks	Elton; 53.2675°N 2.8181°W	Medieval	An almost square moat with a causeway across the north arm and a channel at the northwest corner leading to a fishpond.
Farndon Bridge		Bridge	Farndon; 53.0836°N 2.8798°W	c. 1345	A bridge crossing the River Dee and the England-Wales border leading from Farndon to Holt. It is listed at Grade I.
Farnworth churchyard cross		Stone structure	Farnworth, Widnes; 53.3842°N 2.7275°W	Medieval	This consists of a medieval base and plinth with a 19th-century shaft in St Luke's churchyard.
Fir Tree Farm moated site		Earthworks	Chester; 53.1651°N 2.9094°W	Medieval	This consists of a dry moat enclosing an area 15m wide with a bank and ditch in the west and south.
Foulk Stapleford moated site		Earthworks	Foulk Stapleford; 53.1714°N 2.7723°W	Medieval	A square moat with rounded corners; River Gowy is to the west and a disused mill race to the east.
Foxtwist moated site		Earthworks	Prestbury; 53.3152°N 2.1570°W	Medieval	The remains of a deep inner moat that enclosed a raised platform which is accessed by a causeway.
Gawsworth churchyard cross		Stone structure	Gawsworth; 53.2240°N 2.1660°W	15th century	This consists of a square cross-base and an octagonal shaft on a stepped plinth in the churchyard of St James'. There are carvings of beasts at the corners of the plinth. It is listed at Grade II.
Gawsworth roadside cross		Stone structure	Gawsworth; 53.2310°N 2.1688°W	Medieval	This consists of a plinth of dressed gritstone blocks rising to two steps, which is surmounted by a gritstone block cut into two steps with a fragment of shaft. It was the base for a preaching cross.
Glaziers Hollow		Glass works	Delamere Forest; 53.2464°N 2.7007°W	15th–16th century	The probable site of a medieval wood-burning glass furnace which was discovered in 1933. It was excavated in 1933–35 and again in 1947.
Golden Stone		Boulder	Nether Alderley; Over Alderley; 53.2942°N 2.2069°W	Medieval	A large boulder which acted as a boundary marker between the estates of the Stanley and De Trafford families.
Grafton		Earthworks	Grafton; 53.0563°N 2.8243°W	Medieval	Evidence of several ditched enclosures shown by aerial photography which are overlain by an ornamental moat. These probably represent a deserted village.
Great Merestone		Boulder	Finlow Hill; 53.2847°N 2.2107°W	Medieval	A stone 1.3m in diameter and 0.4m high marking the boundary between Nether Alderley and Over Alderley.
Hall Bank moated site		Earthworks	Wybunbury; 53.0451°N 2.4448°W	Medieval	Earthworks of a square moat and a causeway leading towards the church.
Halton Castle		Ruined castle	Halton; 53.3331°N 2.6957°W	c. 1070 and later	Ruins of a castle which was involved in the Civil War and then partly demolished, scheduled and listed at Grade I.
Harthill Bank Castle		Earthworks	Oakmere; 53.2423°N 2.6511°W	Medieval	An earthwork which is scheduled as a motte and bailey.
Hatton Hall moated site		Earthwork	Hatton; 53.1440°N 2.7907°W	Medieval	A square moat, largely water-logged, which formerly enclosed Hatton Hall.
Haycroft medieval village		Earthworks	Spurstow; 53.1108°N 2.6660°W	Medieval	Aerial photography has revealed evidence of a medieval village and a field system.
Headless Cross		Stone	Oakmere; 53.2066°N 2.6252°W	Medieval	This consists of the stone socket for a cross. The shaft is missing.
Holford Hall moated site		Earthworks	Plumley; 53.2751°N 2.4377°W	Medieval	An almost complete waterlogged moat accessed by a stone bridge and a causeway. The platform is occupied by a 17th-century farmhouse.
Hough Hall moated site		Earthworks	Mere; 53.3464°N 2.4195°W	Medieval	A platform surrounded by a dry moat, with two small fishponds and a dam.
Hulme Hall moated site		Moat	Allostock; 53.2478°N 2.4139°W	Medieval	The moat and the ground beneath the bridge and the hall are scheduled.
Huntington Hall moated site		Earthworks	Huntington; 53.1651°N 2.8692°W	Medieval	Site of moated manor house.
Huntington Hall moated site (south)		Earthworks	Huntington; 53.1520°N 2.8545°W	Medieval	A square platform surrounded by a bank.
Iddinshall moat		Moat	Tarporley; 53.1594°N 2.6979°W	Medieval	A large moat, now dry, surrounding an area of 4 acres (1.6 ha) on which Iddinshall Hall stood.
Ince Manor		Buildings and earthworks	Ince; 53.2830°N 2.8271°W	13th–14th century	Formerly a monastic grange. There are also earthworks from a possible moat and a fishpool and portions of a boundary wall. The former hall and domestic range were restored in the 2000s. The hall is listed at Grade I.
Jarman Farm moated site		Earthworks	Sutton Lane Ends; 53.2407°N 2.1053°W	Medieval	A curving ditched enclosure comprising one-third of a former moat. It is the only circular medieval moated site in Cheshire.
Kinderton Hall moat and fishponds		Earthworks	Kinderton; 53.1995°N 2.4392°W	Medieval	Earthworks of a former moat and fishponds.
Knutsford chapel		Stone slabs	Knutsford; 53.3053°N 2.3529°W	Early 14th century	A chapel originally dedicated to St Helena, later to St John, stood on the site and was demolished in 1741.
Lea Hall moat		Moat	Near Aldford; 53.1239°N 2.8503°W	Medieval	A moated site 52m x 43m formerly containing Lea Hall, the middle arm of which has been filled in.
Little Moreton Hall		Building, moat and garden	Odd Rode; 53.1271°N 2.2522°W	15th century	The moated site of a manor house and the remains of an Elizabethan formal garden. The timber framed hall on the site is listed at Grade I.
Longstone		Stone structure	Little Budworth; 53.2047°N 2.6160°W	Medieval	Part of a medieval cross shaft set on modern base at a junction of a road leading to Vale Royal Abbey. It is listed at Grade II.
Longstone Lane wayside cross		Stone	Little Budworth; 53.2055°N 2.6203°W	Medieval	It consists of a square stone with a hollowed top on a 19th-century plinth, thought to have been a wayside cross and also a plague stone. It is listed at Grade II.
Lovel's Hall moated site		Earthworks	Halebank; 53.3574°N 2.7846°W	Medieval	A square moated platform with a dry ditch formerly occupied by Lovel's Hall.
Lower Huxley Hall moated site		Moat and platform	Huxley; 53.1551°N 2.7524°W	Medieval	A water-filled moat. partly lined with sandstone, with a platform now occupied by the 15th-century Lower Huxley Hall and its gardens.
Lymm Hall moat and ice house		Earthworks	Lymm; 53.3793°N 2.4759°W	Medieval	Site of a moated medieval manor house with its ice house on a mound to the west. A later house has been built on the moated platform and a modern summer house on the site of the ice house.
Maiden's Cross		Stone	Alvanley; 53.2568°N 2.7294°W	Medieval	A trapezoidal piece of sandstone with a chamber on the front face. Possibly the base of a wayside cross or a plague cross. It is listed at Grade II.
Malpas Cross		Stone structure	Malpas; 53.0201°N 2.7655°W	Medieval	The cross has a medieval octagonal base of seven steps. The rest of the cross was added in 1873. It is listed at Grade II.
Marton churchyard cross		Standing cross	Marton; 53.2087°N 2.2255°W	Medieval	This consists of the broken shaft of a cross on a stepped plinth in the churchyard of St James and St Paul. It is listed at Grade II. The rest of the shaft is inside the church.
Marton Grange moated site		Earthworks	Marton; 53.2036°N 2.5662°W	Medieval	A moated site which contained a monastic grange which is accessed by a bridge with associated fishponds. The site includes the mutilated socket stone of a sandstone cross.
Merricks Hill chamber		Foundations	Delamere; 53.2183°N 2.6688°W	c. 1354	The foundations of a hunting lodge and administrative centre for the Royal Forest of Delamere on Eddisbury Hill.
Middleton Grange moated site		Earthworks	Aston; 53.2883°N 2.6674°W	Medieval	A moated site with eight fishponds and connecting channels. It was originally a monastic grange and later the site of Middleton Hall and a chapel.
Mill Hill House Farm moat		Moat	Eccleston; 53.1567°N 2.8974°W	Medieval	A square moat about 80m across, grass-covered and normally dry.
Minshull Vernon moated site		Earthworks	Minshull Vernon; 53.1389°N 2.4662°W	Medieval	A complete double moat, the external moat being dry and the inner one water-filled. A dry fishpond connects to the outer moat.
Mobberley churchyard cross		Stone structure	Mobberley; 53.3183°N 2.3161°W	Medieval	This consists of a stone cross base and part of cross shaft in the churchyard of St Wilfrid's. It is listed at Grade II.
Monks Lane moated site		Moat and platform	Acton; 53.0743°N 2.5549°W	Medieval	Square platform 10m wide surrounded by a water-filled moat.
Nether Alderley churchyard cross		Stone structure	Nether Alderley; 53.2818°N 2.2390°W	Medieval	The base is square below and shaped to octagonal above into which a rectangular shaft is set. It stands in St Mary's churchyard and is listed at Grade II.
Nether Alderley village cross		Stone structure	Nether Alderley; 53.2891°N 2.2362°W	Medieval	Built in buff and red sandstone, this consists of a massive square base on which are three steps and a cube-shaped block. Into this is set a broken rectangular shaft. It is listed at Grade II.
New Manor Farm moated site		Earthworks	Preston Brook; 53.3188°N 2.6311°W	Medieval	A rectangular platform surrounded by a water-filled moat on which is a modern farmhouse.
Norbury Booths Hall moated site		Moat and earthworks	Knutsford; 53.2981°N 2.3467°W	Medieval	The largest moat in Cheshire, partly water-filled. A stone chamber outside the moat, which was formerly a cess-pit, is linked by a stone-lined culvert.
Norton Priory		Ruined abbey	Norton, Runcorn; 53.3424°N 2.6795°W	12th century and later	A former Augustinian abbey. After the Dissolution of the Monasteries this was converted into a Tudor, then a Georgian house. This house was demolished in 1928 and the ruins, which are listed at Grade I, now form the basis for a museum.
Old Hall Heys moated site		Earthworks	Hampton Heath; 53.037166°N 2.755984°W	Medieval	A dry rectangular moat from 10–12m wide, enclosing an island 38m x 43m.
Overton		Earthworks	Overton; 53.0294°N 2.7872°W	Medieval and post-medieval	Earthworks of platforms for buildings, hollow ways and the remains of ridge and furrow cultivation indicate a deserted village.
Peel Hall moated site		Moated site	Kingsley; 53.2747°N 2.6907°W	Medieval	This consists of a water-filled moat which is lined with a stone wall. The house burnt down in the 1660s and an 1840 house now occupies the platform.
Peover Superior churchyard cross		Stone structure	Peover Superior; 53.2581°N 2.3431°W	Medieval	The cross base is square rising to octagonal and the shaft was added in 1907. It stands in St Lawrence's churchyard and is listed at Grade II. Part of the shaft of the cross is used elsewhere in the churchyard to support a sundial and is also listed at Grade II.
Pott Shrigley churchyard cross		Stone	Pott Shrigley; 53.3098°N 2.0851°W	Medieval	The base of the cross consists of two stepped stones, which are probably medieval, in the churchyard of St Christopher's. The shaft and cross were added later. It is listed at Grade II.
Prestbury Road cross		Standing stone	Near Macclesfield; 53.2728°N 2.1553°W	11th century	A former parish boundary cross which consists of a pillar in buff sandstone with a broken top. It is listed at Grade II.
Pulford Castle		Earthworks	Pulford; 53.1217°N 2.9349°W	11th century	The remains consist of a mound with an encircling earthwork.
Reaseheath moated site		Earthworks	Worleston; 53.0840°N 2.5228°W	Medieval	An enclosure surrounded by a rectangular moat measuring 53m x 43m which is now dry; the southern arm has been destroyed.
Ridge Hall moated site		Moat and channels	Sutton, Macclesfield; 53.2350°N 2.0980°W	Medieval	A dry rectangular moat with associated channels. It is the only Cheshire moat on a hillside and is the highest in the county.
Rixton Hall moat		Moat	Near Hollins Green; 53.4004°N 2.4773°W	Medieval	A water-filled moat. The present hall lies to the south.
Rushton Hall moated site		Earthworks	Eaton, Rushton; 53.1635°N 2.6312°W	Medieval	A rectangular moated site with no sign of a building on the platform. Adjacent is another moat which was probably a fishpond.
Saddlebole boundary marker		Stone	Nether Alderley; Over Alderley; 53.2995°N 2.2109°W	Medieval	A stone marking the boundary between Nether Alderley and Over Alderley.
Salterswall wayside cross		Stone	Winsford; 53.1986°N 2.5593°W	Medieval	This consists of a square sandstone block with a hollow in its top. It is sited at a road junction and was probably the base for a cross.
Sandbach churchyard cross		Stone structure	Sandbach; 53.1434°N 2.3611°W	Medieval	The base is a massive piece of gritstone formed into two steps. On this is part of the shaft which is rectangular at the bottom, rising to octagonal. It stands in St Mary's churchyard.
Shocklach Castle		Earthworks	Shocklach; 53.0519°N 2.8449°W	Medieval	This consists of a motte 4–5m high, and a D-shaped moated enclosure.
Shotwick Castle		Earthworks	Saughall; 53.2270°N 2.9758°W	Medieval	The earthworks consist of a mound, the remains of the motte, surrounded by a ditch with the bailey to the southeast.
Shotwick Hall moated site		Moat and island	Shotwick; 53.2412°N 2.9966°W	Medieval	This consists of a moat which is mainly silted up surrounding an island about 25m x 32m which now contains a coppice.
Southley Manor moated site		Earthworks	Alpraham; 53.1286°N 2.6279°W	Medieval	This consists of two moated platforms with associated field systems.
Stanlow Abbey		Stone walls	Stanlow Point; 53.2900°N 2.8591°W	1178	A Cistercian monastery which moved to Whalley Abbey in 1296, the site becoming a monastic grange. Some walls and foundations are still present.
Stoak churchyard cross		Stone structure	Stoak; 53.2535°N 2.8655°W	Medieval	This consists of a massive square block of local sandstone with the lower part of a shaft which has been made into a sundial. It stands in St Lawrence's churchyard and is listed at Grade II.
St Oswald's well		Well chamber	Winwick; 53.4421°N 2.5925°W	Medieval	The holy well is lined with stones and contains steps; it is overgrown and covered by a stone slab.
St Winefride's well		Well head and drain channel	Clutton; 53.0918°N 2.7874°W	Medieval	The holy well consists of a stone wellhead and drainage channel.
Swineyard Hall moat		Moat	Near High Legh; 53.3503°N 2.4852°W	Medieval	Three sides of the moat are preserved as a stone-lined ornamental pond. A 16th-century hall stands on the platform.
Sutton End Farm cross		Stone	Sutton, Macclesfield; 53.2203°N 2.0676°W	Medieval	A sandstone block which was a waymarker. It is listed at Grade II.
Tabley Old Hall		Derelict house on moated site	Tabley Inferior; 53.2926°N 2.4218°W	c. 1380 and later	This consists of the remains of a house built in 1380, and subsequently extended, which used to contain a timber-framed hall. It partly collapsed in 1927 and was abandoned leaving a shell of the building which is listed at Grade II*.
Tarporley churchyard cross		Stone structure	Tarporley; 53.1579°N 2.6691°W	Medieval	This consists of a square base of red sandstone and a shaft of yellow sandstone which stands in St Helen's churchyard. It is listed at Grade II.
Tatton settlement, old hall and mill dam		Earthworks	Tatton Park; 53.3280°N 2.3673°W	Late Neolithic, Saxon, and medieval	A former village occupied in the late Neolithic, Saxon and medieval periods. Now deserted and only earthworks remain. Includes the ground beneath Tatton Old Hall.
Tilston churchyard cross		Stone structure	Tilston; 53.0497°N 2.8110°W	Medieval	This consists of a two steps with an octagonal base supporting an octagonal shaft. It stands in St Mary's churchyard.
Toothill enclosure		Earthworks	Macclesfield Forest; 53.2454°N 2.0440°W	Medieval	A quadrilateral enclosure whose purpose is uncertain.
Upton Grange moat		Moat	Upton; 53.2163°N 2.8640°W	Medieval	A dry moat to the east of Upton Grange.
Vale Royal Abbey		Buildings, foundations	Vale Royal; 53.2247°N 2.5423°W	Medieval	The largest Cistercian church in England which was demolished after the Reformation and replaced by a mansion.
Venables' tomb		Canopied tomb	Newbold Astbury; 53.1505°N 2.2315°W	Late 13th century	A canopied tomb in the churchyard of St Mary's. It is listed at Grade II*, and is a scheduled monument.
Warmingham churchyard cross		Stone structure	Warmingham; 53.1459°N 2.4364°W	c. 1298	A cross base of three steps and a socket stone to which a later shaft has been added. It stands in St Leonard's churchyard and is a Grade II listed building.
Wervin chapel		Ruined building	Wervin; 53.2403°N 2.8711°W	13th century or earlier	Ruins of a chapel.
Wood Farm moated site		Earthworks	Woolstanwood; 53.0995°N 2.4947°W	Medieval	The moat was trapezoidal in shape and it enclosed a platform 90m square.
Woodhey wayside cross		Stone structure	Faddiley; 53.0694°N 2.6323°W	Medieval	The remains of medieval wayside cross at the junction of four lanes which consist of a square section of a shaft standing on a socket stone on a number of pieces of stone from a later date. It is listed at Grade II*.
Wybunbury moated site		Moat	Wybunbury; 53.0426°N 2.4457°W	Medieval	A moat surrounding a platform 40m square with outlet channels, a causeway and a nearby fishpond.

== See also ==
- List of scheduled monuments in Cheshire dated to before 1066
- List of scheduled monuments in Cheshire since 1539
- Grade I listed buildings in Cheshire
