= Castle Park House =

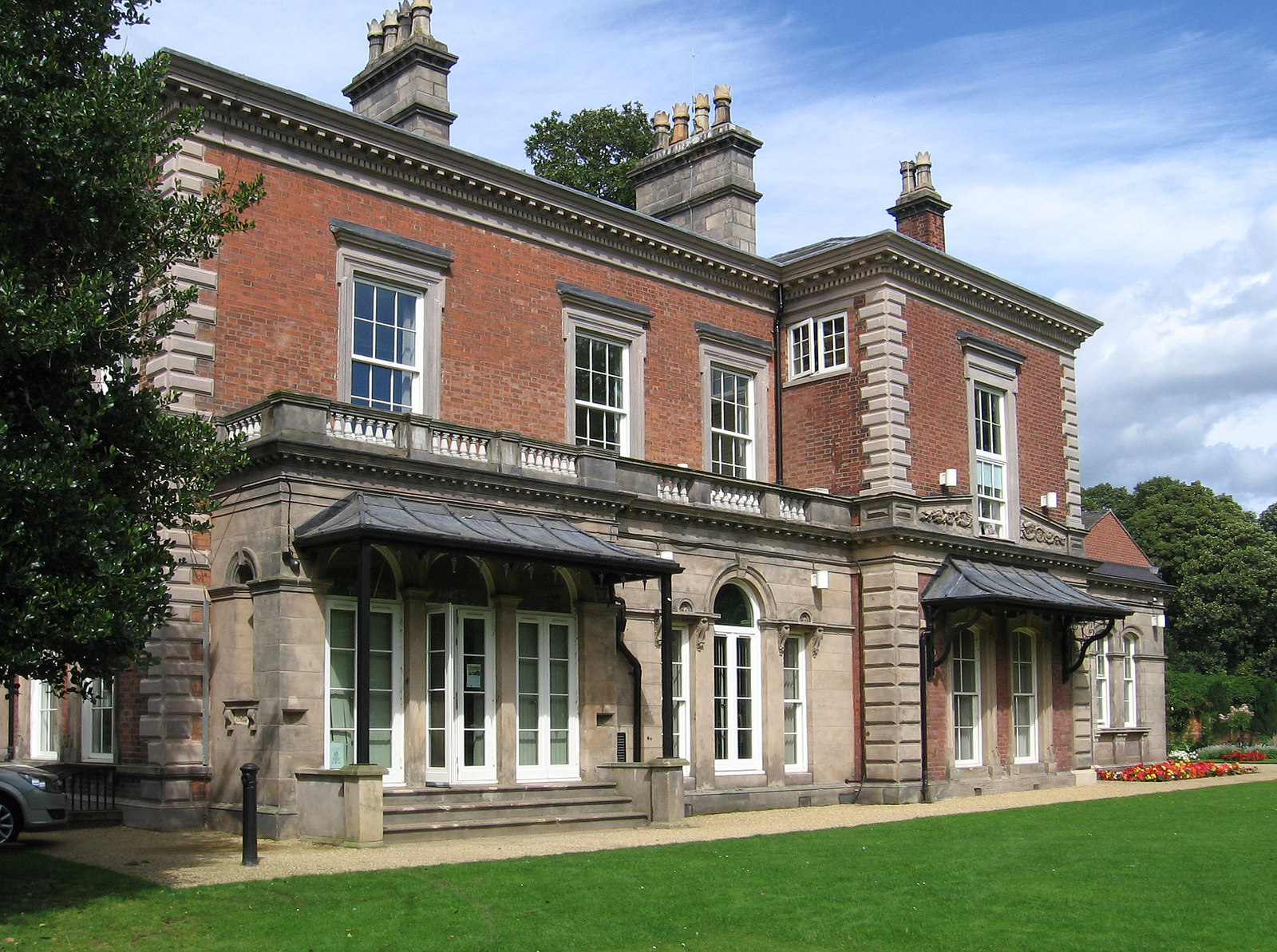

- Location in Cheshire
- 53.2926°N 2.7309°W
- Location: Frodsham, Cheshire, England
- OS grid reference: SJ 514,775

History
- Built: Late 18th century
- Built for: Robert Wainwright Ashley
- Rebuilt: 1850s

Site notes
- Area: Over 24 acres (97,000 m^{2})
- Architect: T. M. Penson (?)
- Architectural style: Italianate
- Governing body: Cheshire West and Chester Council

Listed Building – Grade II
- Official name: Castle Park, Frodsham
- Type: Historic parks and gardens
- Designated: 18 June 2002
- Reference no.: 1001622

Castle Park House is a former country house surrounded by extensive grounds in the market town of Frodsham in Cheshire, England. It is reputedly built on the site of Frodsham Castle, and originates from the late 18th century. It was extended in the 1850s, and its gardens were laid out by Edward Kemp. The house and most of the associated park land is held subject to the terms of a charitable trust - the Castle Park Trust. Cheshire West and Chester Council is the sole trustee of this trust. That council owns the 'top field' outright. The house and park land are used for a variety of functions. The house and park land are 'listed' in other words given special protection in planning law.

== House ==
=== History ===
The house is reputedly built on the site of Frodsham Castle which burnt down in 1654. In the late 18th century the first house on the site, Park Place, was built by Robert Wainwright Ashley, a lawyer in the town. On his death the house was inherited by his eldest son, Major Daniel Ashley II until his death in 1841. It was then inherited by his brother Reverend Thomas Ashley, but mortgaged to Philip Humberston of Chester. During this time it was leased to Captain Harry Heron.

In 1851 it was bought by Joseph Stubs of Warrington, a manufacturer of engineers' tools. He started to develop and extend the house and outbuildings and commissioned Edward Kemp to lay out the woods and gardens, which comprised an area of more than 24 acres (97,000 m^{2}). The architect for the rebuilding was probably T. M. Penson. Its style is "reserved Italianate". Stubs did not live to see the work completed as he died in 1861. It was bought by auction for over £9,500 (equivalent to £980,000 in 2025) by Edward Abbott Wright, a Quaker cotton manufacturer from Oldham. The house then came to be known as Castle Park. The Wrights had five children, a boy who died at the age of 14, and four girls. Edward's wife died in 1868 and Edward continued to live in the house, commuting for his business and political interests from Frodsham railway station, until he died at the age of 83 in 1891. Following this, Edward's two unmarried daughters, Harriet and Emily continued to live in the house until the last remaining daughter, Harriet died in 1931.

=== Today ===
The grandchildren of Edward, who were the beneficiaries of the will, presented the house and 12 acres (49,000 m^{2}) of ornamental grounds to the Runcorn Rural District Council (of which Frodsham was at that time a part) for the "use, enjoyment and benefit" of the inhabitants. The grounds were used as a public park and the house as the offices of the Rural District Council. After the reorganisation of 1974 the ground floor was used by Vale Royal Borough Council and Frodsham Parish Council.

In 2006 the house and park land underwent major refurbishment - much of the funding coming from the Heritage Lottery fund and the then Vale Royal District Council. The house and much of the park land is held by Cheshire West and Chester Council under the terms of a charitable trust although the council owns the Top Field outright.

The archives of the Frodsham and District Local History Group are held in the house.

== Outbuildings and gardens ==
=== History ===
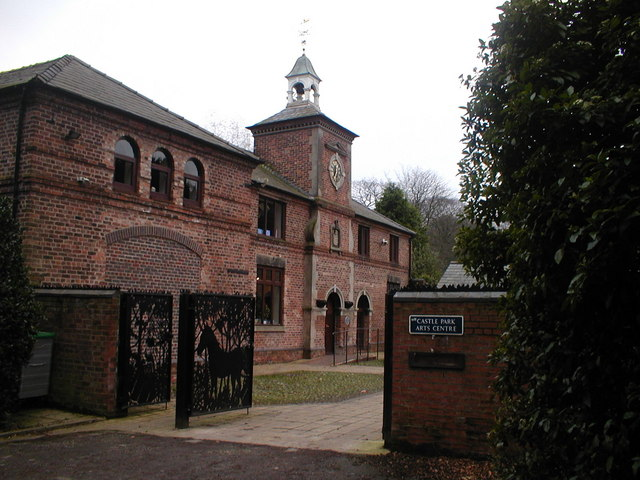
Castle Park Arts Centre

Edward Kemp's plan was for a formal garden containing a conservatory and plant houses to the north of the house. Beyond these were a garden yard, a stable yard, a coach house and a farm yard. To the west of these was a substantial kitchen garden. The other outbuildings included a vinery, with a heated wall, and a smoke house for curing bacon and ham. Joseph Stubs was a collector of rare plants and many of these were planted in what he called the American Garden. In the days of the Wright family a head gardener and seven full-time gardeners were employed and also during this time more outbuildings were constructed beyond the coach house.

=== Today ===
An extensive area of parkland stretches up the hill to the west of the house. Some of the trees planted by Joseph Stubs are still present, although coming to the end of their lives. The formal garden is still there and a garden for the disabled has been constructed by Frodsham Round Table. In the park there are play facilities for children. The coach house has been developed into the Castle Park Arts Centre which has a small café and showrooms for the arts. Other outbuildings are now used as offices for small businesses. The park and gardens have been designated at Grade II in the National Register of Historic Parks and Gardens.
