= Kingsley Castle =

Coordinates: 53.2556°N 2.7003°W

Map showing the location of Kingsley Castle within Cheshire

Kingsley Castle, also known as Castle Cob, a medieval motte near Kingsley, Cheshire, England. (grid reference SJ53387341) It is listed as a Scheduled Ancient Monument. The motte is a cone shaped mound, 2.8 metres (9.2 ft) high; it has a diameter of 23 metres (75 ft) at the base and tapers to 6 metres (20 ft) at the top. It is artificial and made from black soil.

Historians used to think that the motte was a large barrow. The stone steps and concrete foundations of a summerhouse not contemporary with the castle are excluded from the protection of the scheduling. There have been limited excavations on the site by antiquarians.

== See also ==
- List of castles in Cheshire
