= Shotwick Castle =

Coordinates: 53.2269°N 2.9757°W

- Shotwick Park, Cheshire, England
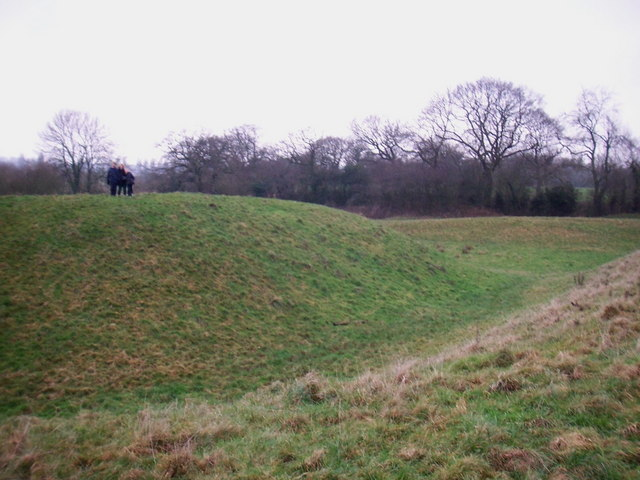
- Earthworks of Shotwick Castle

Site information
- Type: Motte-and-bailey
- Owner: The Crown
- Controlled by: Cheshire West and Chester
- Open to the public: Free access
- Condition: Earthworks only

Site history
- Built: c.1093
- Built by: Hugh Lupus, 1st Earl of Chester
- In use: 11th to 14th century
- Materials: Stone; Timber; Earth
- Demolished: 17th century
- Battles/wars: None
- Events: Welsh Wars

Shotwick Castle is a Norman medieval fortification near the village of Saughall, Cheshire, England. Construction began in the late 11th century. Its purpose was to control a crossing point on the River Dee between England and Wales. The site is a scheduled monument. No masonry features remain above ground except for earthworks.

== History ==
Hugh Lupus, 1st Earl of Chester, had a castle constructed at Shotwick about 1093. It was sited atop a promontory that had steep-sided river banks formed from two watercourses that flowed – at this point – into the River Dee. The castle had an earthen hexagonal motte with an outer bailey. It also had two large defensive ditches (25 metres (82 ft) wide and 3 metres (9.8 ft) deep) that became flooded at high tide. The castle's main purpose was to control movements across a tidal ford that once existed at this point on the original course of the river. (In the 18th century the River Dee was diverted to the south along a man-made canalised section.)

The Earls of Chester, such as Ranulf de Blondeville, had paid for the upkeep of the defences during the 12th and early 13th centuries. Henry II and Henry III stayed at the castle during their campaigns against the Welsh. In 1237 Shotwick was one of several castles belonging to the Earldom of Chester that were acquired by The Crown following the death of John, 7th Earl of Chester. As the Anglo-Scottish magnate died childless, his sisters were obliged to cede some of his estates and properties to Henry III.

In September 1284 Edward I visited the Royal Castle on his way to Flint Castle from Chester Castle following the conclusion of the second Welsh campaign. However, with the end of military action in Wales, the castle lost its strategic importance. By 1327, the land around Shotwick was emparked as a royal deer park for Edward III who used the castle as a hunting lodge. Some parts of the outer bailey and ditches were redeveloped as landscaped gardens and ponds. When the Black Prince visited in 1353 it was not even garrisoned and was referred to as a manor not a castle. The last major repairs were documented in 1371. The area's landscaping was a rough contemporary to Bodiam Castle, East Sussex, completed in 1384.

Shotwick Castle was in ruins by the 17th century in what had become Shotwick Park.

== Archaeology ==
In 1876 a local schoolmaster called Williams made a partial excavation of the castle site, finding glazed pottery, a spur and fragments of deer horns. There is little left of the castle today, other than a few earthworks. A survey of the earthworks in the 1990s showed evidence that it had become a country house with ornamental gardens in the late medieval period.

== See also ==
- Scheduled Monuments in Cheshire (1066–1539)
- List of castles in Cheshire
