= Pulford Castle =

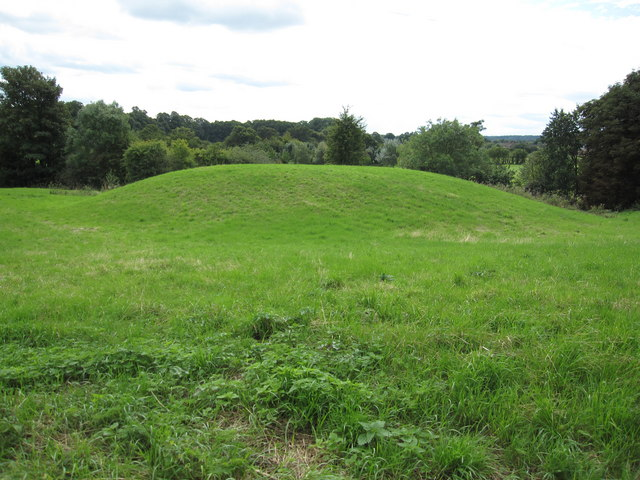

- Location within Cheshire
- 53.12178°N 2.93493°W
- Type: Motte-and-bailey castle
- Location: Pulford, Cheshire West and Chester

Scheduled monument
- Official name: Pulford motte and bailey castle
- Designated: 29 December 1952
- Reference no.: 1012078

Pulford Castle is in the village of Pulford, Cheshire, England, immediately south of St Mary's Church (grid reference SJ375586). It is listed as a Scheduled Ancient Monument.

== History ==
The castle is a small motte and bailey guarding the crossing of Pulford Brook, which forms the border between England and Wales, and adjacent to the Wrexham–Chester road. It was founded in the 12th century by Robert de Pulford. Only the earthworks remain. In 1313, a jury of the Chester county court found that the lord of Little Caldy (Wirral) held that manor by the service of 'palisading' (i.e. repairing the wooden defences) of Robert de Pulford's castle at Pulford.

== See also ==
- List of Scheduled Monuments in Cheshire (1066–1539)
- List of castles in Cheshire
