= Listed buildings in Pulford =

Pulford is a former civil parish, now in the parish of Poulton and Pulford, in Cheshire West and Chester, England. It contains 15 buildings that are recorded in the National Heritage List for England as designated listed buildings. Of these, one is listed at Grade II*, the middle grade, and the others are at Grade II. The parish is within the estate of Eaton Hall, the country seat of the Dukes of Westminster and, apart from the village of Pulford, is rural. The listed buildings are mainly estate buildings and a church, the later buildings being designed by the Chester architect John Douglas, alone or with his partners.

== Key ==
Grade	Criteria
II*	Particularly important buildings of more than special interest.
II	Buildings of national importance and special interest.

== Buildings ==
Name and location	Photograph	Date	Notes	Grade
Pump Cottages; 53.12418°N 2.93291°W	—	17th century	A row of three cottages, which were altered in the 19th century. They are basically timber-framed, later mainly encased in painted brick. The row has an H-shaped plan, with two gables in the front facing the road. The windows are casements. A 19th-century brick outbuilding is included in the listing.	II
Old Rectory; 53.1219°N 2.9339°W	—	c. 1800	This originated as a house with a square plan, and was extended to the north in the mid-19th century. It is built in brick with a hipped slate roof. The original part of the house has two storeys, with three bays on the west and south fronts, and sash windows. The extension has 2 1/2 storeys and casement windows. The outbuilding to the north is included in the listing.	II
Cottage, north of Green Paddocks; 53.1325°N 2.9308°W	—	Before 1815	This originated as a cottage with an attached shippon and hayloft. It is a rectangular building in brick with a slate gabled roof. The cottage has two storeys and a front of three windows. On the front are cast iron Gothick casement windows.	II
Lyndale Farmhouse; 53.1307°N 2.9291°W	—	c. 1830	A painted brick farmhouse with a slate pyramidal roof. It is in two storeys, with two windows across the front, and a central doorway. On the left of the doorway is a canted bay window. The windows are Gothick-style casements.	II
Parish Room; 53.1232°N 2.9347°W		c. 1850	A hall built in brick with rusticated sandstone quoins and a hipped slate roof. At the rear is a Tudor arched opening containing a Gothick window with a cast iron frame. The other windows have been replaced.	II
North Lodge; 53.1227°N 2.9339°W	—	c. 1850	Located on the north side of the entrance to the Pulford Approach to Eaton Hall, the lodge incorporates the lodge keeper's cottage. It is constructed in stone, and has a chimney of three separate octagonal flues. Around the top is a parapet and false gables. At the front of the lodge is a sandstone wall, on the end of which is a pyramidal cap with a ball finial.	II
South Lodge; 53.1225°N 2.9340°W	—	c. 1850	The lodge is on the south side of the entrance to the Pulford Approach to Eaton Hall, and was a store shed disguised as a cottage. It is in Jacobean style, and built in sandstone with parapets and false shaped gables. On the front are mullioned windows, above which are the Grosvenor coat of arms. The sandstone forecourt wall is included in the listing.	II
Oak Cottage and Glenwood; 53.12819°N 2.93157°W	—	1865	A pair of brick cottages on a sandstone plinth with gabled slate roofs. The cottages are in simplified Jacobean style, with two storeys, each cottage being one window wide. The windows are lattice casements. Oak Cottage has an added lean-to porch.	II
Manor Cottages; 53.12771°N 2.93193°W	—	1867	A pair of brick cottages on a sandstone plinth with gabled slate roofs. The cottages are in simplified Jacobean style, with two storeys, each cottage being one window wide. The windows are lattice casements. The single-storey outbuilding to the rear is included in the listing.	II
Green Paddocks; 53.1320°N 2.9310°W	—	1871–72	Originally known as the Limes Farmhouse, it was designed by John Douglas for Hugh Grosvenor, who was then the 3rd Marquess of Westminster. It is built in brick with red tile roofs, and has two storeys with attics. The entrance front is symmetrical, with three bays. The central bay protrudes forward, with an arched doorway, and a pargetted gable. The lateral bays have dormers under shaped gables. The windows are mullioned, or mullioned and transomed.	II
Cuckoo's Nest; 53.1367°N 2.9249°W	—	Late 19th century	This is a complex of buildings constituting the terminus and the workshops for the Eaton Hall Railway. It was designed by John Douglas for the 1st Duke of Westminster. The complex includes the superintendent's office, workshops, offices, barns, and a smithy.	II
Meadow House farm buildings 53.1331°N 2.9563°W		Late 19th century	The design of the farm buildings is attributed to John Douglas. They are built in brick which is rendered with mock timber-framing. They form an irregular L-shaped complex, and have been little altered since they were built.	II
St Mary's Church; 53.1223°N 2.9348°W		1881–84	The church replaced an earlier one on the site. It was designed by John Douglas, with the 1st Duke of Westminster paying part of the cost. The church is built in red sandstone with bands of lighter-coloured stone, and has a red-tiled roof. It has a cruciform plan, and consists of a nave without aisles, a chancel with transepts, a north porch, and a shingled northwest steeple; it is in Decorated style.	II*
Park House and Ivy Cottage; 53.1239°N 2.9340°W	—	1887	This is a house with an attached cottage designed by Douglas and Fordham for the 1st Duke of Westminster. They are built in brown brick with blue brick diapering, and have red tile roofs. The building is in two storeys, the upper storey being slightly jettied. The house has three bays, and the cottage one. The windows are casements.	II
War Memorial; 53.12318°N 2.93459°W		c. 1920	The war memorial stands in front of the village hall in an enclosed area. It consists of an obelisk in pink polished granite with a carved wreath and bow and with a pedimented cornice. This is on tapering plinth on two steps with a base in red sandstone of two steps. There is an inscription on the plinth, and the names of those lost in the two World Wars are inscribed on the steps.	II
