= St Mary's Church, Pulford =

Coordinates: 53.1224°N 2.9348°W

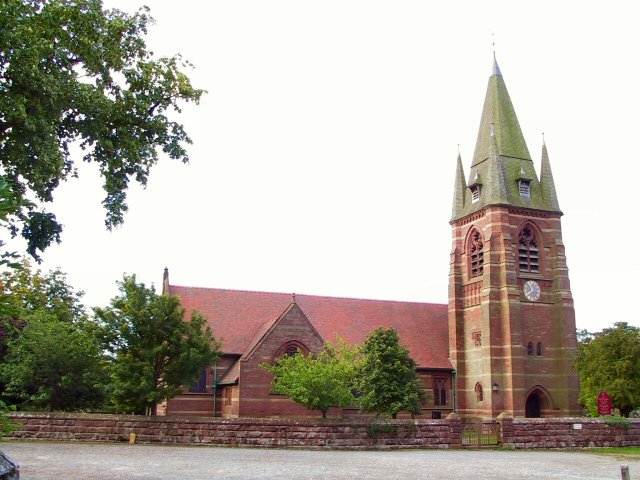
- St Mary's Church, Pulford

- Location in Cheshire
- OS grid reference: SJ 375,587
- Location: Pulford, Cheshire
- Country: England
- Denomination: Anglican
- Website: St Mary, Pulford

History
- Status: Parish church
- Dedication: St Mary

Architecture
- Functional status: Active
- Heritage designation: Grade II*
- Designated: 2 November 1983
- Architect: John Douglas
- Architectural type: Church
- Style: Gothic Revival
- Groundbreaking: 1881
- Completed: 1884

Specifications
- Materials: Red sandstone with bands of lighter stone Red tiled roof, shingled

Administration
- Province: York
- Diocese: Chester
- Archdeaconry: Chester
- Deanery: Chester
- Parish: Eccleston and Pulford

St Mary's Church is in the village of Pulford, Cheshire, England. The church is recorded in the National Heritage List for England as a designated Grade II* listed building. It is an active Anglican parish church in the diocese of Chester, the archdeaconry of Chester and the deanery of Chester. Its benefice is combined with that of St Mary, Eccleston.

== History ==
The present church was built on the site of an earlier church between 1881 and 1884. The architect was John Douglas and its expense was met partly by the 1st Duke of Westminster. In the 1990s the spire was destroyed by fire and has been rebuilt.

== Architecture ==
=== Exterior ===
The church is built in red sandstone with bands of lighter stone. The roofs have red tiles and the spire is shingled. The plan of the church is cruciform and consists of a nave without aisles, a chancel with transepts to the north and south, and a north porch. The south transept forms an organ chamber and vestry. The tower is large and buttressed with a spire and octagonal corner spirelets. The church is designed in Decorated style.

=== Interior ===
The monochrome reredos is by Shrigley and Hunt. Two of the stained glass windows are by Heaton, Butler and Bayne, and one is by Kempe. On the south wall is a memorial board by the Randle Holme family of Chester to the memory of members of the Burgayney family who died between 1670 and 1693. It had been mislaid during the rebuilding of the church in the 1880s and was rediscovered at an auction some 70 years later by a canon from Chester Cathedral. There is a ring of eight bells, all of which were cast by John Taylor and Company, six of them in 1882 and the other two in 1903.

== External features ==
In the churchyard is a sundial dated 1702. Also in the churchyard, to the west of the church, is a war grave of a Royal Welsh Fusiliers soldier of World War I. To the south of the church are the earthworks of Pulford Castle.

== See also ==
- Grade II* listed buildings in Cheshire West and Chester
- Listed buildings in Pulford
- List of new churches by John Douglas
