= Aldford Castle =

Aldford, Cheshire castle

- Blobb Hill
- Aldford, Cheshire
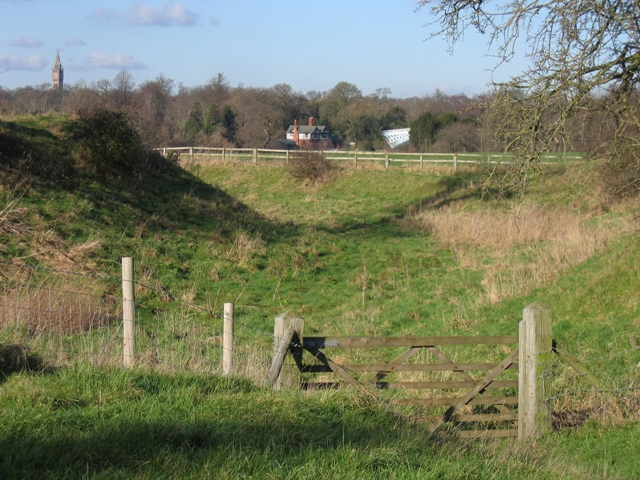
- Earthworks of Aldford Castle

Site information
- Type: Motte and bailey
- Open to the public: No
- Condition: Earthworks

Location
- Location in Cheshire
- Coordinates: 53.1304°N 2.8698°W
- Grid reference: grid reference SJ419596

Site history
- Built: 12th century
- Built by: Richard de Aldford

Aldford Castle is a motte and bailey castle in the village of Aldford in Cheshire. The motte is to the north of St John's Church, and the church stands on the site of an infilled bailey ditch.

The origin and dates of construction of the castle are uncertain. It is thought that it was initially an earth-and-timber construction, possibly built by Robert de Alford in the mid-12th century, in the time of Henry II. However, archaeological evidence of the date is lacking and it may have been significantly earlier, as there are some sources who claim that the castle had been built much earlier, as its command was handed over to Robertus, one of the descendants de Bigod in 1160. One of the earliest written records establishes that it was in the possession of Richard de Alford in the early 13th century and, after his death in 1213, of the family of John de Aderne who likely married de Alford's daughter Margaret. Archaeological findings show that it was rebuilt in stone as a shell keep castle in the 13th century. The purpose of the castle appears to have been as a defensive fortification against the hostile Welsh tribes. There is some debate as to whether the castle, the lands and the title were hereditary or granted due to military service. Some sources even suggest that, up until 1224, the owners had to pay for the lease of the castle.

Today fragments of the stonework around the bailey and significant earthworks survive, five miles from Chester where the tributary stream joins the River Dee at an angle. The castle appears to have been triangular, shaped like a harp, with the keep in the northwestern corner of the triangle. Where the keep used to be is now a mound overlooking the River Dee, which the locals call Blobb Hill. The site is a Scheduled Monument.

== See also ==
- List of castles in Cheshire
- List of Scheduled Monuments in Cheshire (1066–1539)
