= Dodleston Castle =

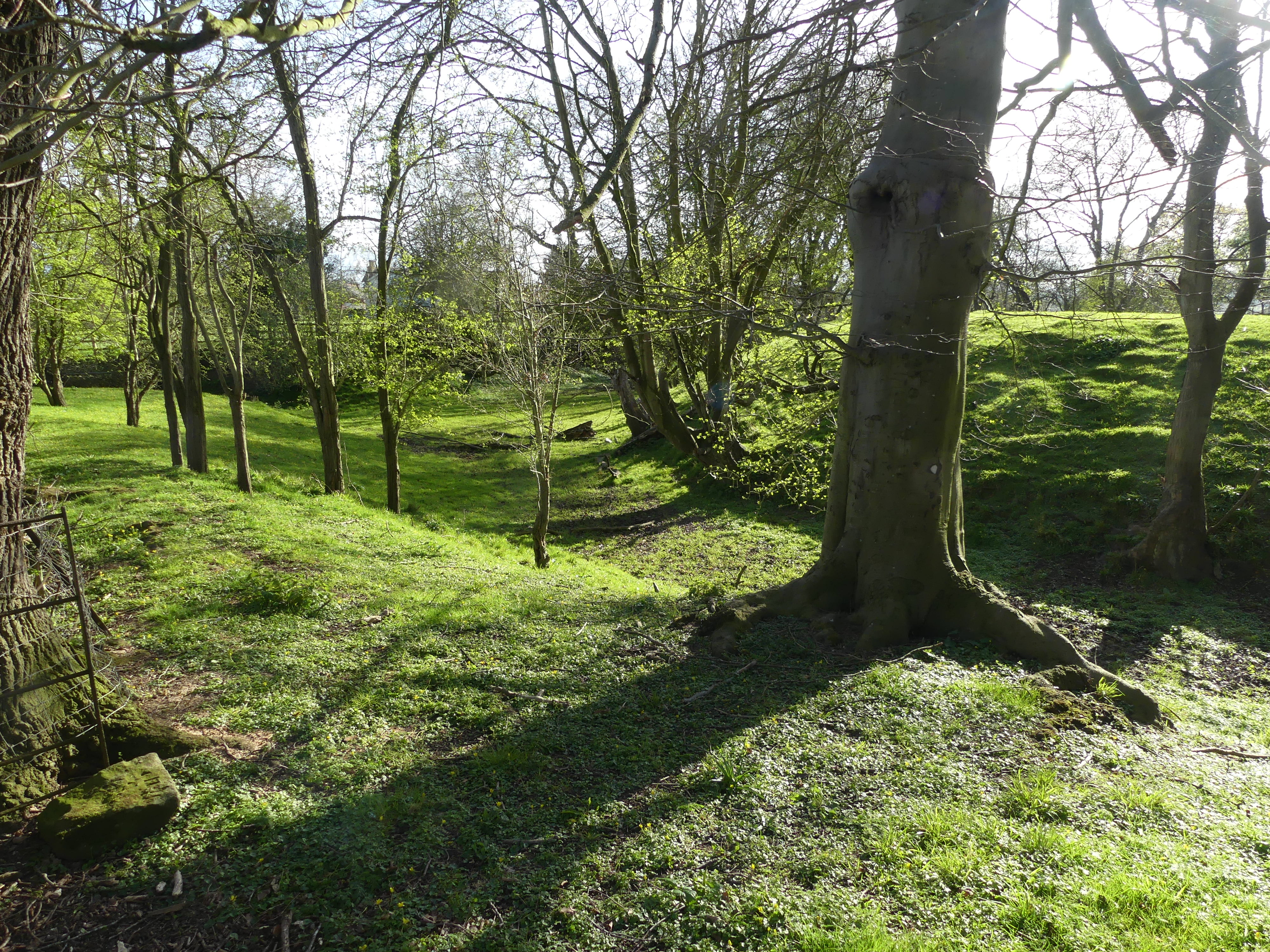
- Earthworks and moat remains, from adjacent churchyard
- Interactive map of the Dodleston Castle area

General information
- Architectural style: Ringwork; Motte-and-bailey
- Location: Dodleston, Cheshire, England
- Coordinates: 53.1410°N 2.9562°W

Scheduled monument
- Official name: Dodleston motte and bailey castle
- Designated: 29 December 1952
- Reference no.: 1012419

Dodleston Castle in Cheshire is a medieval motte-and-bailey castle that was developed from an earlier ringwork It is first recorded in 1277, but may have existed in the 12th century when the manor of Dodleston was held by the Boydel family. The site has been protected as a scheduled monument since 1952. The earthworks were surveyed in 1964, 1986, and 1995 – the third survey was the most detailed and was carried out by University College Chester.
