= Pulford =

Village in Cheshire, England

Coordinates: 53.124°N 2.933°W

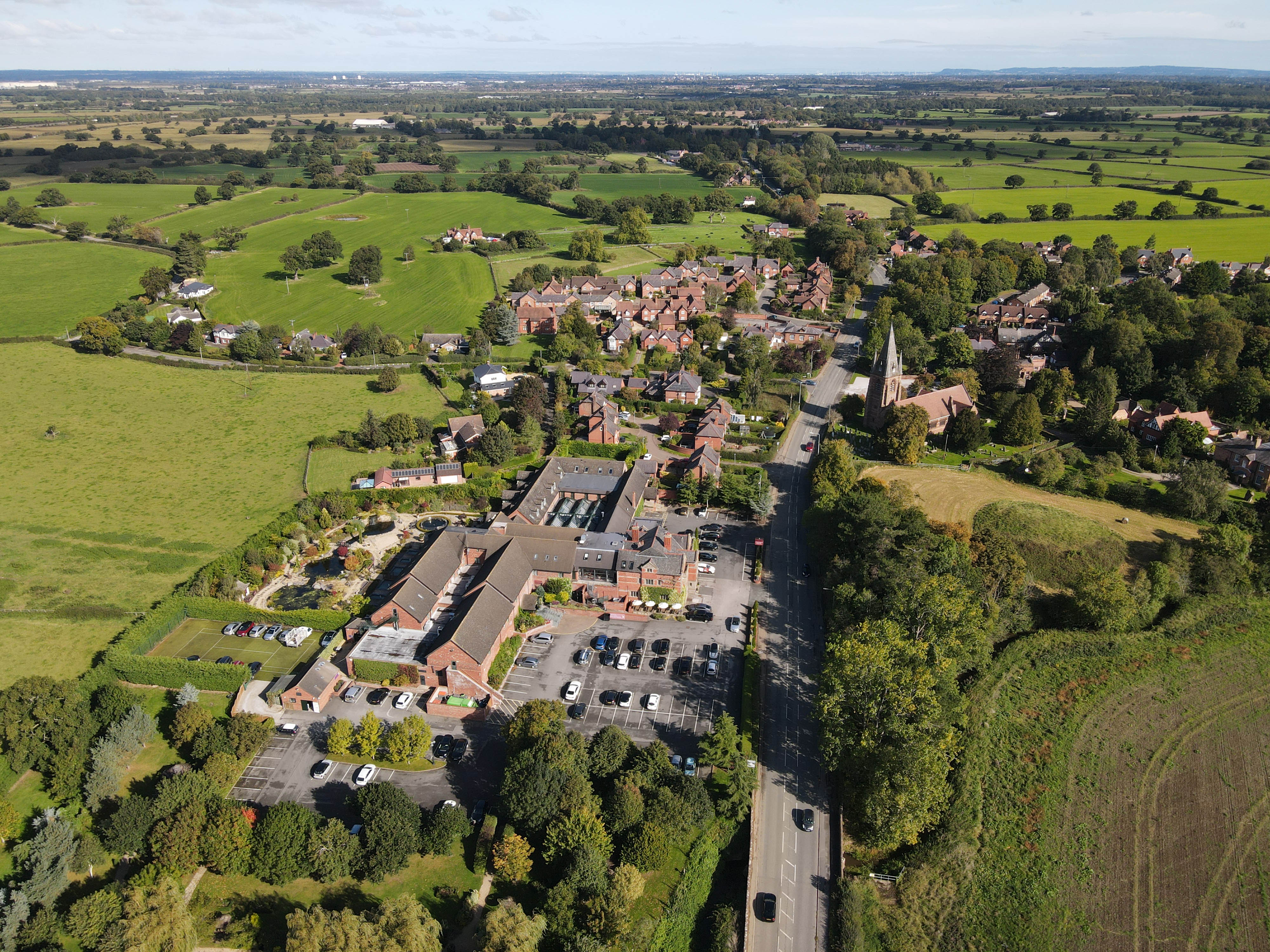
- Pulford village showing St Mary's Church and hotel complex

- Location within Cheshire
- Population: 580 (2011 census)
- OS grid reference: SJ376589
- Civil parish: Poulton and Pulford
- Unitary authority: Cheshire West and Chester
- Ceremonial county: Cheshire
- Region: North West
- Country: England
- Sovereign state: United Kingdom
- Post town: CHESTER
- Postcode district: CH4
- Dialling code: 01244
- Police: Cheshire
- Fire: Cheshire
- Ambulance: North West
- UK Parliament: City of Chester

Pulford is a village and former civil parish, now in the parish of Poulton and Pulford, in the unitary authority of Cheshire West and Chester and the ceremonial county of Cheshire, England. It is on the B5445 road, to the south west of Chester and on the border with Wales. The civil parish, which included the hamlet of Cuckoo's Nest, was abolished on 1 April 2015 and merged with Poulton to form "Poulton and Pulford".

According to the 2001 census, the population of the entire parish was 395, increasing to 580 at the 2011 census.

== History ==
The settlement was recorded in the Domesday Book of 1086, consisting of seven households across two separate landowners: Hugh FitzOsbern and St Weburgh Abbey, in Chester.

Pulford was previously a parish within Broxton Hundred, becoming a civil parish in 1866. The population was recorded over time at 170 in 1801, 204 in 1851, 305 in 1901, 285 in 1951 and increasing to 395 by 2001.

== Landmarks ==
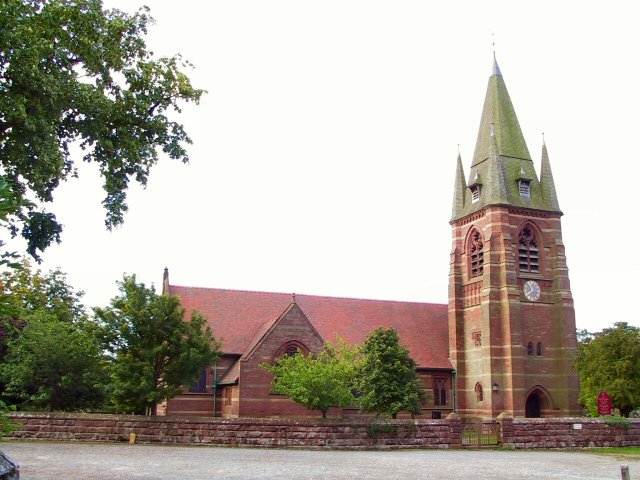
St Mary's Church

Pulford Castle, which no longer stands, was a small Norman motte-and-bailey defensive structure. Today, only the mound of the castle remains, just behind the church of St Mary, on the outskirts of the village. The castle remnants were designated a scheduled monument in 1952. The castle was built at a strategic location, protecting a road at a river crossing. Although no firm date of construction is recorded, it is believed to have been built around 1100. The castle is mentioned as having a garrison stationed at it, during the revolt of Owain Glyndŵr in 1403.

Pulford Parish Church is dedicated to St. Mary and is designated a Grade II* listed building. It was rebuilt in 1884 to a design by the architect John Douglas, the benefactor being Hugh Lupus Grosvenor, 1st Duke of Westminster. Mention of a church on the site can be traced back the 12th century and the first rector is mentioned in ancient records as one Hugo. The church's spire is 120 feet high. In the 1980s a fire completely destroyed the roof of the church tower, which was later restored.

The village is home to a large hotel, the Grosvenor Pulford Hotel. Grosvenor is the family name of the Duke of Westminster, whose seat is at nearby Eaton Hall.

== See also ==
- Listed buildings in Pulford
