= Grade II* listed buildings in Cheshire West and Chester =

There are over 20,000 Grade II* listed buildings in England. This page is a list of these buildings in the unitary authority of Cheshire West and Chester.

== List ==
Name	Location	Type	Completed (Note: The date given is the date used by Historic England as significant for the initial building or that of an important part in the structure's description.)	Date designated	Grid ref. (Note: The grid reference is based on the British national grid reference system, sometimes known as OSGB36, used by the Ordnance Survey.) Geo-coordinates	Notes	Entry number (Note: The "List Entry Number" is a unique number assigned to each listed building and scheduled monument by Historic England.)	Image
Hall Green Farmhouse and attached front garden wall	Acton Bridge	Farmhouse	Late 16th or early 17th century	16 September 1985	SJ5964775398; 53°16′26″N 2°36′23″W	This is basically a timber-framed house with a hall and a cross-wing, later enclosed in brick. Inside the house are mural paintings of Cheshire scenes.	1287596	Upload Photo
Hulme Hall	Allostock	House	15th century	3 January 1967	SJ7247272379; 53°14′52″N 2°24′51″W	Alterations and additions were made in the 17th and 19th centuries. The house is constructed in brick with slate and stone-slate roofs. It has an asymmetrical plan, with two storeys and an attic, The entrance front has three gabled bays, and the garden front has five bays. The moated site on which the house stands is a scheduled monument.	1160324	Hulme Hall More images
Bridge over moat at Hulme Hall	Allostock	Bridge	15th century	10 March 1953	SJ7249272433; 53°14′53″N 2°24′44″W	The bridge is built in sandstone and has two segmental arches. The cutwaters rise as buttresses to parapet level, where they form seats.	1138456	Bridge over moat at Hulme Hall More images
Alvanley Hall	Alvanley	House	17th century	8 January 1970	SJ5035373749; 53°15′31″N 2°44′45″W	An L-shaped sandstone farmhouse in two storeys plus attics with slate roofs. The windows are mullioned. In the cellar are two large medieval circular piers on polygonal bases.	1136561	Alvanley Hall More images
Ashton Hall Farmhouse	Ashton Hayes	Farmhouse	Early 17th century	1 March 1967	SJ5068469006; 53°12′57″N 2°44′24″W	This consists of a farmhouse and a cottage added later in the 17th century. The top storey of the farmhouse was remodelled in the 19th century. The building is in sandstone with concrete tile roofs and brick chimneys on the gables. The house is in three storeys with a five-bay front, and the cottage has two storeys and an attic and is in two bays. The windows in the lower storeys of the house are mullioned and transomed, those in the top storey are casements, and in the cottage they are mullioned.	1130556	Ashton Hall Farmhouse
St Oswald's Church	Backford	Church	Late 13th century	1 June 1967	SJ3980871693; 53°14′20″N 2°54′12″W	The chancel dates from the late 13th century, the tower from about 1500, and the nave was rebuilt in brick in 1731. The church was remodelled in 1877–79 by Ewan Christian. It is constructed in sandstone with slate roofs. Inside the church are wall paintings by Edward Frampton.	1115612	St Oswald's Church More images
St Bartholomew's Church	Barrow	Church	1671	1 June 1967	SJ4695268338; 53°12′34″N 2°47′45″W	The chancel was built in 1671, and the tower is dated 1744. In 1871 John Douglas carried out a limited restoration, followed by a more substantial scheme in 1883. The church is constructed in sandstone with tiled roofs, and consists of a nave, a north aisle, a south porch, a chancel, and a west tower.	1298821	St Bartholomew's Church More images
Brook Farm Cottage	Beeston	House	Late 16th to early 17th century	1 March 1967	SJ5429158629; 53°07′22″N 2°41′04″W	This is a timber-framed house with whitewashed brick infill and a tiled roof. It is in two storeys, the upper floor being gabled and jettied. The windows consist of casements, mullioned and transomed windows, and dormers.	1130508	Brook Farm Cottage
Bostock Hall	Bostock	Country house	c.1775	10 March 1953	SJ6764768250; 53°12′37″N 2°29′09″W	A country house, thought to have been designed by Samuel Wyatt. It is constructed in brick with ashlar dressings and a slate roof. The house has three storeys and a basement, and an L-shaped plan. In the entrance front is a single-storey porch with balustraded parapet. The fenestration includes sash windows, a Venetian window, and a Diocletian window.	1138416	Bostock Hall More images
Bolesworth Castle	Broxton	House	1829	4 January 1984	SJ4950355988; 53°05′55″N 2°45′20″W	This is a castellated country house, designed by William Cole. The interior was partly remodelled and structures in the grounds were created by Clough Williams-Ellis in 1920–23. It is constructed in sandstone, and is in two storeys, with a three-storey turretted centre portion.	1278804	Bolesworth Castle More images
Burton Hall	Burton	House	Early 17th century	22 October 1952	SJ5089063864; 53°10′13″N 2°44′11″W	This is a country house constructed in brick with sandstone dressings and a slate roof. It has a square plan, is in three storeys with a basement, and has a symmetrical three-bay front under a gable with a finial. The door is approached by ten steps. The windows are mullioned and transomed.	1130559	Burton Hall More images
Chorlton Old Hall	Chorlton	House	1666	1 March 1967	SJ4593648203; 53°01′42″N 2°48′27″W	Additions and alterations have been made to the country house since it was first built. It is constructed in brick and has a slate roof. The house is in 2 1/2 storeys, and has a T-shaped plan. The front has four bays, of which the right hand bay and the entrance bay project forward, and have shaped gables. The other two bays contain dormers. The rest of the windows are casements.	1330594	Chorlton Old Hall More images
St James' Church	Christleton	Church	Late 15th century	1 June 1967	SJ4407765722; 53°11′08″N 2°50′18″W	The church, other than the tower, was rebuilt in 1874–78 by William Butterfield. On the tower is a shingled pyramidal cap. The church is constructed in red and white sandstone with a slate roof. The body of the church consists of a nave and chancel in one range with a clerestory, north and south aisles, a south porch, and side chapels to the chancel.	1330249	St James' Church More images
Dixon's Almshouses	Christleton	Almshouse	1868	22 August 1984	SJ4430265926; 53°11′15″N 2°50′06″W	A row of six almshouses, designed by J. Oldrid Scott. They are timber-framed on a sandstone plinth, with tiled roofs, and are in Tudor Revival style. They are in one and two storeys, with a symmetrical six-bay front. Between the timber-framing, the plaster panels are decorated with pargeting. On the front are two gabled two-storey porches, and to the rear are three single-storey projecting entrances with verandahs.	1330247	Dixon's Almshouses More images
Christleton Old Hall	Christleton	House	Early 17th century	4 June 1952	SJ4418765714; 53°11′08″N 2°50′12″W	Originally timber-framed, the house was encased in brick in about 1870. It is in two and three storeys, and has an entrance front of seven bays. Inside is "much good Jacobean plasterwork and panelling".	1130666	Upload Photo
Clutton Lodge (East Lodge)	Clutton	Lodge	c. 1830	1 March 1967	SJ4615854443; 53°05′04″N 2°48′19″W	The lodge is constructed in sandstone with a stuccoed brick roof in Baroque style. The roof is in the form of a dome, and carries a terracotta urn. The lodge has a square plan, with concave sides and canted corners. The doorway and window openings are round-headed; the windows are casements.	1278841	Clutton Lodge (East Lodge)
Clutton Lodge (West lodge)	Clutton	Lodge	c. 1830	1 March 1967	SJ4613354444; 53°05′04″N 2°48′20″W	The lodge is constructed in sandstone with a stuccoed brick roof in Baroque style. The roof is in the form of a dome, and carries a terracotta urn. The lodge has a square plan, with concave sides and canted corners. The doorway and window openings are round-headed; the windows are casements.	1278712	Clutton Lodge (West lodge)
Gate piers and railings at Clutton Lodge	Clutton	Gate	c. 1830	1 March 1967	SJ4614754438; 53°05′04″N 2°48′20″W	The gate piers are square and in stone. They are panelled, and topped by a cornice with a tapering finial. The railings are in wrought iron and are ornately decorated.	1230223	Gate piers and railings at Clutton Lodge
Cogshall Hall	Comberbach	Country house	c. 1830	27 August 1986	SJ6319677951; 53°17′50″N 2°33′13″W	A country house in Georgian style to which a rear wing was added in the 20th century. It is constructed in brick with a slate hipped roof. The entrance front has five bays and an Ionic portico and there is a similar, smaller portico on the right side.	1329859	Cogshall Hall More images
St Wilfrid's Church	Davenham	Church	1842–44	3 January 1967	SJ6632371249; 53°14′14″N 2°30′22″W	The body of the church was rebuilt in 1842–44 by Edmund Sharpe, the steeple was damaged by lightning in 1850 and repaired to Sharpe's design by E. G. Paley. The chancel and transepts were built in 1870 by Paley and Austin. The church is constructed in sandstone with a slate roof. It consists of a nave and aisles, transepts, a chancel, and a west steeple.	1138424	St Wilfrid's Church More images
Davenham Hall	Davenham	Farmhouse	1790s (probable)	3 January 1967	SJ6625670717; 53°13′57″N 2°30′24″W	A country house, extended in the 19th century, and later converted into a nursing home. It is constructed in stuccoed brick and has a slate roof. The entrance front is in six bays. In the centre is a porch with four Tuscan columns and an entablature containing a triglyph, above which are two windows with a pediment over them, and a parapet on each side. Inside the house is delicate plasterwork, and a central staircase hall lit by a dome.	1138431	Davenham Hall More images
Whatcroft Hall	Davenham	Country house	Late 18th century	10 March 1953	SJ6799269856; 53°13′29″N 2°28′51″W	A country house, enlarged in 1807, constructed in brick with a slate roof in Georgian style. There are two storeys, with an entrance front of six bays. In the centre of the house is a spiral staircase, above which is a copper-covered, ogee-shaped cupola, surmounted by a weathervane, and standing on a drum containing Gothic-style windows.	1138463	Upload Photo
Dutton Railway Viaduct	Acton Bridge/Dutton	Railway viaduct	1836	18 July 1986	SJ5871775505; 53°16′58″N 2°37′43″W	Built by Joseph Locke and George Stephenson for the Grand Junction Railway in sandstone. It consists of 20 arches crossing the River Weaver.	1216523	Dutton Railway Viaduct More images
Equestrian statue of Hugh Lupus, 1st Earl of Chester	Eaton Hall, Eaton	Statue	1870–79	2 November 1983	SJ4133560714; 53°08′25″N 2°52′42″W	The statue was designed by G. F. Watts for the 1st Duke of Westminster. It is in bronze on a stone plinth standing in the forecourt of the hall, and depicts Hugh Lupus seated on a horse, holding a falcon in a gauntlet.	1312814	Equestrian statue of Hugh Lupus, 1st Earl of Chester More images
Former Postillion's House at south-east corner of stable yard, Eaton Hall	Eaton Park, Eaton	Coachmans cottage	1873	2 November 1983	SJ4141960772; 53°08′27″N 2°52′38″W	A remaining fragment of the great house designed by Alfred Waterhouse for the 1st Duke of Westminster. It stands at the southeast corner of the stable yard, and is joined to the chapel by two-storey wing. The building is in stone with a slate Mansard roof, and has three storeys. At the corners are octagonal turrets.	1136231	Former Postillion's House at south-east corner of stable yard, Eaton Hall More images
Stable court north of Eaton Chapel	Eaton Park, Eaton	Stables	1877–79	2 November 1983	SJ4139060811; 53°08′27″N 2°52′35″W	Designed as stables by Alfred Waterhouse for the 1st Duke of Westminster, it consists of four ranges forming a courtyard. It is constructed in brick with half-timbering and tiles roofs. The building includes arched entrances, stair turrets, gables with bargeboards and finials, former accommodation for grooms, a library, and a Long Room (formerly a stable, later converted into a drawing room).	1330616	Stable court north of Eaton Chapel
Walls, gates, overthrow and gate piers, Eaton Hall	Eaton Park, Eaton	Gate	c.1870	2 November 1983	SJ4154860934; 53°08′32″N 2°52′33″W	Designed by Alfred Waterhouse for the 1st Duke of Westminster, the walls are 12 feet (4 m) high and in brick, the gate piers are in brick and sandstone, and the gates and overthrow in wrought iron. The walls separate the nursery and kitchen gardens from the main part of the gardens. The overthrow contains a portcullis medallion and the Grosvenor sheaf.	1138395	Walls, gates, overthrow and gate piers, Eaton Hall
Eccleston Hill Lodge including gatehouse and attached storeshed and domestic offices (west)	Eaton Park, Eccleston	Lodge	1881–82	2 November 1983	SJ4090262203; 53°09′12″N 2°53′02″W		1136352	Eccleston Hill Lodge including gatehouse and attached storeshed and domestic offices (west) More images
Eccleston Paddocks	Eccleston	Managers house	1883	28 August 1973	SJ4117862378; 53°09′18″N 2°52′47″W		1138377	Eccleston Paddocks More images
Former schoolmaster's house with storeshed and domestic offices attached	Eccleston	Teacher's house	1878	2 November 1983	SJ4109762617; 53°09′26″N 2°52′52″W		1138414	Former schoolmaster's house with storeshed and domestic offices attached
St Marys Church of England School	Eccleston	Church school	1878	2 November 1983	SJ4110462616; 53°09′26″N 2°52′51″W		1138415	St Marys Church of England School More images
Edge Hall	Edge	House	c.1600	22 October 1952	SJ4808850308; 53°02′51″N 2°46′33″W	A country house with a timber-framed core, standing on a moated site, it was encased in brick in about 1700. The front dates mainly from 1721, and there have been later alterations and additions. It has two storeys, and is in six bays, with two gables to the left of the entrance, and three to the right. The entrance is recessed, and has a brick parapet with stone balusters. Above the entrance is an octagonal open cupola with a hemispherical roof and a ball finial. The doorcase has Corinthian pilasters supporting an open pediment. On the rear are bow windows. Inside, the hall contains an Ionic screen, and in the dining room is an elaborate chimneypiece.	1105682	Edge Hall More images
Barnston Memorial	Farndon	Obelisk	1858	28 November 1984	SJ4136255174; 53°05′26″N 2°52′37″W	The memorial, designed by E. A. Heffer, is to the memory of Major Barnston, who was killed in the Crimean War. It consists of a slim yellow sandstone obelisk, surrounded by cast iron railings. It is flanked by four crouching lions, and carries a plaque inscribed with details of his service and death.	1279425	Barnston Memorial More images
St Chad's Church	Farndon	Church	14th century	1 March 1967	SJ4132354452; 53°05′02″N 2°52′39″W	The oldest fabric in the church is in the lower part of the tower. The church was badly damaged in the Civil War, following which it was largely rebuilt in 1658. It was restored in the 19th century. The church is constructed in sandstone with slate roofs, and consists of a nave, a chancel, a north porch, a south vestry, and a west tower.	1279424	St Chad's Church More images
Holly Bank, formerly the Doctor's House	Farndon	House	Late 17th century	1 March 1967	SJ4147454423; 53°05′02″N 2°52′30″W	A brick house with stone dressings and a slate roof. It is symmetrical, and in three storeys. The windows are sashes. Inside the house is an inglenook and oak panelling.	1228744	Holly Bank, formerly the Doctor's House More images
St Peter's Church, Hargrave	Hargrave, Foulk Stapleford	School	1627	1 March 1967	SJ4853862215; 53°09′16″N 2°46′16″W	This was originally built as a chapel and a school. It was paid for by Thomas Moulson, who came from the village and later became Lord Mayor of London. The building was later converted for use as a church, and was restored in 1878–80. This restoration, and the addition of a vestry, have been attributed to John Douglas. The church is built in sandstone with a tiled roof, and consists of a nave and chancel in one range, a south porch and a vestry.	1130643	St Peter's Church, Hargrave More images
The Old Vicarage, Vicarage Lane	Frodsham	House	Early 18th century	6 December 1985	SJ5229577208; 53°17′23″N 2°43′01″W	The house was altered in the early 19th century, and then extended and remodelled in 1872 by John Douglas. It is constructed in brick with stone dressings and has a tiled roof. The vicarage is in two storeys plus an attic. Its features include a turret with a tall roof, and diapered brickwork.	1253364	Upload Photo
The Old Schoolhouse	Great Budworth	School	1615	30 June 1958	SJ6649977554; 53°17′38″N 2°30′15″W	A school in the churchyard built for Sir John Deane, later used as a meeting room. It is a brick building with sandstone dressings on a sandstone plinth, with a stone-slate roof, stone quoins, and timber-framed gables. It has a rectangular plan, is in two storeys, and has mullioned windows. The upper storey was added in about 1750, and the building was restored in 1860 for Rowland Egerton-Warburton.	1139127	The Old Schoolhouse More images
Hampton Old Hall	Hampton Heath, Hampton	Timber-framed house	1591	1 March 1967	SJ5084249140; 53°02′14″N 2°44′05″W	The country house has been subsequently altered and extended. The main block is timber-framed on a stone plinth, with wings in stone and diapered brick. The roofs are partly slated and partly tiled. The building is in two storeys with cellars, and the front of the main block is in three bays, each with a gable surmounted by a finial. On the right side is a timber-framed porch. The windows are mullioned and transomed, containing casements.	1129932	Upload Photo
Calveley Hall	Handley	House	1684	22 October 1952	SJ4544158575; 53°07′18″N 2°49′00″W	The country house was remodelled in 1880, and further alterations were made during the 20th century. It is built in rendered brick on a stone plinth, and has slate roofs. The entrance front is symmetrical, with three storeys, and is in seven bays, the lateral bays being recessed. The doorcase has columns and a semi-circular fanlight. The windows are sashes.	1278640	Calveley Hall More images
All Saints Church	Handley	Church	1512	1 March 1967	SJ4663057880; 53°06′55″N 2°47′56″W	The tower is the oldest part of the church. The rest of the church was restored in 1854 by James Harrison who replaced all the masonry, but re-used the hammerbeam roof dated 1661. A chancel and vestry were added in 1891. The church is built in red sandstone with a slate roof, and has a three-bay nave. The tower is embattled, and has gargoyles.	1230337	All Saints Church More images
Hartford Beech	Hartford	Villa	1802	3 January 1967	SJ6400172645; 53°14′59″N 2°32′28″W	The house was remodelled between 1814 and 1824 for Thomas Marshall, and has since been divided into two houses. It is constructed in stuccoed brick, and has a hipped slate roof. The house is in Neoclassical style with Gothic details.	1287228	Upload Photo
All Saints Church	Harthill	Church	1609	1 March 1967	SJ5007155290; 53°05′33″N 2°44′49″W	The church replaced an earlier chapel. It was restored in 1862–63 when the vestry and a larger belfry were added. The church is built in sandstone with a slate roof. The nave and chancel are in one range and have a hammerbeam roof. Inside the church is the framework of a screen bearing the date 1609.	1278683	All Saints Church More images
Hockenhull Hall	Hockenhull	Apartment	Remodelled c.1715	22 October 1952	SJ4839466108; 53°11′21″N 2°46′21″W		1130525	Hockenhull Hall More images
Peel Hall	Horton-cum-Peel	House	1812	22 October 1952	SJ4984169755; 53°13′21″N 2°45′10″W	This was built as a mansion, but was much reduced in size by 1812, and was later used as a farmhouse. It is built in sandstone with slate roofs, and is in Jacobean style. The house has an L-shaped plan, is in three storeys with a basement, and has a symmetrical five-bay south front. The doorcase has a Tuscan architrave and a fanlight. The windows are mullioned and transomed. William III was entertained in the house on his way to Ireland to fight the Battle of the Boyne.	1130527	Peel Hall More images
Lower Huxley Hall	Lower Huxley, Huxley	House	Late 15th century	22 October 1952	SJ4979162267; 53°09′19″N 2°45′09″W	The former manor house stands on a moated site. Major additions and alterations were made to it in the 17th century. The house is partly timber-framed, the rest being in orange brick, with blue brick diapering. It has sandstone dressings and a Welsh slate roof. The house has an L-shaped plan, and is in two storeys with attics. The east wing has a symmetrical three-bay west front, the end bays projecting with gables. The windows are mullioned and transomed. The moated site on which the hall stands is a scheduled monument.	1330237	Lower Huxley Hall More images
Bridge over moat and archway to Lower Huxley Hall	Lower Huxley, Huxley	Bridge	Late medieval	1 March 1967	SJ4976562253; 53°09′18″N 2°45′09″W	The bridge crosses the moat around the hall, with an archway on the hall side of the bridge, and the remains of a former curtain wall. Apart from a few bricks in the wall, the structures are in sandstone. The bridge has two segmental arches, triangular cutwaters, a plain parapet, and a flagged carriageway. The archway has a rosette on its keystone, and an entablature with an open pediment flanked by finials. Only stubs of the wall remain.	1130648	Upload Photo
St James' Church	Ince	Church	c.1485–93	26 September 1963	SJ4498676352; 53°16′53″N 2°49′36″W	The church is built in sandstone with slate roofs. It consists of a nave, a north aisle, a chancel, a south porch, and a west tower. The oldest fabric is in the east window, and the tower dates from the later part of the 15th century. Much of the church was rebuilt in Perpendicular style in 1854 by Edward Hodkinson.	1138815	St James' Church More images
Manor House Farmhouse	Newton, Kingsley	Farmhouse	Late 17th century	6 December 1985	SJ5295875080; 53°16′14″N 2°42′24″W	A brown brick house with blue-brick banding, sandstone quoins, and a slate roof. It is in two storeys and has an attic, a two-storey porch, and a lean-to extension. One of the rooms has oak panelling.	1261737	Manor House Farmhouse
St Peter's Church	Little Budworth	Church	15th–16th century	3 January 1967	SJ5985565369; 53°11′02″N 2°36′08″W	The tower was built between about 1490 and 1526 in Perpendicular style. The body of the church was rebuilt in 1798–1800, and the interior was restored in 1870–71 by John Douglas. It is constructed in sandstone with a slate roof, and consists of a nave, a chancel, and a west tower.	1139201	St Peter's Church More images
Dodds Charity almshouses and garden wall	Little Budworth	Almshouses	Late 17th century	10 March 1953	SJ5949065348; 53°11′01″N 2°36′28″W	The almshouses are constructed in brick with sandstone dressings and a tiled roof. They are in two storeys, with a symmetrical entrance front of five bays. There is a central round-headed doorway surrounded by quoins and voussoirs. The windows are mullioned. The garden wall is included in the listing.	1329852	Dodds Charity almshouses and garden wall More images
Screens, lodges and gates, Oulton Park	Little Budworth	Gate	c. 1775	3 January 1967	SJ5913065309; 53°11′00″N 2°36′47″W	These were designed by Joseph Turner for the Oulton Estate, and are constructed in sandstone. There is a central arched gateway containing iron gates, Above the arch is a heraldic shield, and Rococo decoration, including swags. Flanking the gateway are two-storey lodges with large blind arches and pedimented gables and more swags. Outside the lodges are curved screen walls.	1138435	Screens, lodges and gates, Oulton Park More images
Monument to John Francis Egerton at Oulton Park	Little Budworth	Commemorative monument	1846 or 1847	12 March 1986	SJ5903065208; 53°10′57″N 2°36′52″W	The monument is to John Francis Egerton, and was designed by Scott and Moffatt. It is in the form of an Eleanor cross, is in Gothic style, its features including statues, pinnacles and a spire.	1310479	Monument to John Francis Egerton at Oulton Park
Gates, gatepiers and steps at south-west corner of churchyard	Malpas	Gate	1720s	28 August 1985	SJ4862747147; 53°01′08″N 2°45′57″W		1330288	Gates, gatepiers and steps at south-west corner of churchyard
Gates, overthrow, side screen gatepiers and steps, with handrails, south-east corner of churchyard	Malpas	Gate	1720s	28 August 1985	SJ4869547194; 53°01′09″N 2°45′54″W		1135998	Gates, overthrow, side screen gatepiers and steps, with handrails, south-east corner of churchyard More images
The Old Printing House	Malpas	House	1733	22 October 1952	SJ4867547156; 53°01′08″N 2°45′55″W		1130593	Upload Photo
Vault, tombchest and memorial of the Hurleston family attached to east end of St Peter's Church	Plemstall, Mickle Trafford	Chest tomb	c.1670	27 November 1984	SJ4572670088; 53°13′30″N 2°48′52″W	This consists of a vault, a tombchest, and a memorial plaque in Baroque style. The vault cover is carved with a pair of skeletons, scrolls, and crossed palm fronds.	1229397	Vault, tombchest and memorial of the Hurleston family attached to east end of St Peter's Church More images
Chapel of Mostyn House School	Parkgate, Neston	Collegiate chapel	1895	22 March 1974	SJ2803777952; 53°17′37″N 3°04′52″W	The chapel was designed by Frederick Fraser and Warburton, with input by the headmaster of the school, A. G. Grenfell. It is built in red Ruabon brick with terracotta dressings, and has a red tiled roof with a finial at the east end. The chapel consists of a nave and chancel in a single range, an apsidal east end, and a west bellcote. The furnishings are in collegiate style, designed by Frederick Fraser. In the windows is painted glass made by Morton and Company of Liverpool.	1387786	Chapel of Mostyn House School
St Mary's and St Helen's Church	Neston	Parish church	14th century	27 December 1962	SJ2915077442; 53°17′21″N 3°03′51″W	The body of the church was largely rebuilt in 1875, re-using some 12th-century fabric. It is constructed in sandstone with slate roofs, and is in Early English style. The church consists of a nave with a clerestory, aisles, a chancel with a north vestry, and a west tower, which is battlemented.	1387671	St Mary's and St Helen's Church More images
Farm building to Leighton Hall (Leighton Hall not included)	Leighton, Neston	Farmhouse	1665	22 March 1974	SJ2860979349; 53°18′22″N 3°04′17″W		1387675	Upload Photo
Moorside House and attached railings	Neston	House	Early 18th century	27 December 1962	SJ2878777611; 53°17′27″N 3°04′11″W	The house is in brick on a stone plinth with stone dressings and a slate roof. It has a double-range plan, is in three storeys, and has a four-bay front. Four steps lead up to the doorway, which has a shell canopy. The windows are sashes with wedge lintels. At the top of the house is a cornice and a plain parapet. The wrought iron railings are included in the listing.	1387716	Moorside House and attached railings
Seven Steps, Butchers Shop and Teal Cottage	Parkgate, Neston	Terrace house	Early 18th century	12 July 2002	SJ2788178180; 53°17′45″N 3°05′01″W	A terrace of three pebbledashed houses, built in red brick, possibly with stone dressings. The roofs are slated at the front, and tiled at the back. The houses have three storeys and cellars, gabled half-dormers, and each house is approached by a flight of steps. The butcher's shop has 2 1/2 bays; the other two houses have a single bay. The windows are sashes. Seven Steps contains wall paintings.	1061375	Seven Steps, Butchers Shop and Teal Cottage
St John the Evangelist's Church	Norley	Church	1878–79	17 April 1986	SJ5607572830; 53°15′03″N 2°39′35″W	Designed by J. L. Pearson, the church is constructed in red sandstone with a red tile roof. Its style is that of the later 13th century; it has a central tower.	1139162	St John the Evangelist's Church More images
Puddington Old Hall, Priests House and Priests House Flat	Puddington	House	15th century	4 June 1952	SJ3261873314; 53°15′09″N 3°00′41″W	The hall originated as a timber-framed building with a quadrilateral plan around a courtyard on a moated site. During the Popish Plot it housed Catholics. The house was re-walled in the 18th century, and alterations were made in 1909. It has been converted into two houses and a flat. The building retains three sides around a courtyard, and is in two storeys, with a Welsh slate roof. The windows are casements.	1115567	Puddington Old Hall, Priests House and Priests House Flat More images
Church of St Mary	Pulford	Church	1881–84	2 November 1983	SJ3753658763; 53°07′19″N 2°56′01″W		1138390	Church of St Mary More images
Church of St Mary the Virgin	Bruera, Saighton	Church	14th–15th century	1 June 1967	SJ4376760548; 53°08′20″N 2°50′27″W		1136639	Church of St Mary the Virgin More images
Front garden walls and gatepiers at Shotwick Hall	Shotwick	Gate	c.1665	10 October 1985	SJ3372672041; 53°14′27″N 2°59′35″W		1130585	Front garden walls and gatepiers at Shotwick Hall More images
Shotwick Hall	Shotwick	Manor house	1662	4 June 1952	SJ3374672054; 53°14′28″N 2°59′34″W		1115124	Shotwick Hall More images
Kinderton Hall	Sproston	Country house	Early 18th century	3 January 1967	SJ7086166953; 53°11′56″N 2°26′16″W	A brick country house with a slate roof, it is in two storeys with an attic. Its entrance front is in five bays, and it has a double depth plan. The medieval moated site on which the hall stands, together with two annexes, five fishponds, a garden and a prospect mound, is a scheduled monument.	1160372	Upload Photo
Church of St Lawrence	Stoke	Church	1827	1 June 1967	SJ4236573283; 53°15′11″N 2°51′50″W		1139029	Church of St Lawrence More images
Stretton Hall and adjoining stable wing	Stretton	House	1763	22 October 1952	SJ4469452724; 53°04′07″N 2°49′32″W		1229257	Stretton Hall and adjoining stable wing More images
Stretton Mill and steps, millrace and sluice adjoining	Stretton	Steps	16th century	18 July 1972	SJ4545053014; 53°04′17″N 2°48′51″W		1279423	Stretton Mill and steps, millrace and sluice adjoining More images
The Cottage	Sutton	House	Early 17th century	6 December 1985	SJ5444879504; 53°18′38″N 2°41′06″W	The cottage has earlier internal features, and probably incorporates a timber-framed core. It stands on a sandstone plinth, has a pebbledashed exterior, and a thatched roof. There is a 19th-century brick rear wing.	1253573	Upload Photo
St Helen's Church	Tarporley	Church	15th century	3 January 1967	SJ5535362528; 53°09′29″N 2°40′09″W	The oldest parts of the church are the two chapels. Since then there have been alterations on a number of occasions during the 18th, 19th and 20th centuries. In the 19th century J. S. Crowther carried out three restorations, and in 1931–32 a baptistry was added by Sir Percy Worthington. The church is constructed in sandstone with a slate roof, and has a southwest tower.	1138446	St Helen's Church More images
Market Hall	Tarporley	Market hall	Mid- to late 18th century	3 January 1967	SJ5538062631; 53°09′32″N 2°40′07″W	The former market hall is constructed in brick with stone dressings and has a hipped slate roof. It is in two storeys with a main front of five bays, which were originally open. On the front are two arches and Tuscan columns, and there are more Tuscan columns inside the building. At the top of the building is a cornice and an open pediment. The upper storey contains five sash windows.	1330176	Market Hall More images
Portal	Tarporley	House	1900–05	14 February 1986	SJ5595663383; 53°09′57″N 2°39′37″W	A large house in Vernacular Revival style designed by W. E. Tower. It is timber-framed with rendered infill, and has a stone slate roof. The house is in two storeys, with a single-storey stable wing to the left and a gabled wing on the right. The symmetrical garden front contains three large bay windows.	1330174	Upload Photo
Rode Street House	Tarporley	Farmhouse	Early to mid 18th century	3 January 1967	SJ5436563354; 53°09′55″N 2°41′03″W	A farmhouse built in brick with stone dressings and a slate roof in two storeys and an attic. The front is in four bays. Flanking the two central bays are large pilasters with capitals, standing on plinths. At the top is a partial Doric entablature and a pediment. The windows are a mix of sashes and casements.	1138449	Rode Street House More images
The Swan Hotel	Tarporley	House	1769	14 February 1986	SJ5538262610; 53°09′32″N 2°40′07″W	A hotel built in brick with ashlar dressings and a slate roof. It is in three storeys and has a symmetrical entrance front of five bays, the central three of which are canted and contain Venetian windows.	1136655	The Swan Hotel More images
Tarvin Hall	Tarvin	House	Mid-–late 18th century	1 March 1967	SJ4895266951; 53°11′49″N 2°45′51″W		1330303	Tarvin Hall
The Flaggs and Hamilton House, and front garden walls and gates	Tarvin	House	1756	22 October 1952	SJ4912766999; 53°11′50″N 2°45′42″W		1330300	The Flaggs and Hamilton House, and front garden walls and gates More images
Church of St Alban	Tattenhall	Church	Early 16th century	1 March 1967	SJ4863958611; 53°07′19″N 2°46′03″W		1230254	Church of St Alban More images
Tattenhall Hall	Tattenhall	House	Early 17th century	1 March 1967	SJ4863358204; 53°07′06″N 2°46′03″W		1230476	Tattenhall Hall More images
Woodlake House	Tattenhall	Farmhouse	Mid-16th century	1 March 1967	SJ4883357403; 53°06′40″N 2°45′52″W		1278610	Upload Photo
Church of St John	Threapwood	Church	1815	1 March 1967	SJ4400245329; 53°00′07″N 2°50′04″W		1129936	Church of St John More images
Church of St Mary	Tilston	Church	16th century	1 March 1967	SJ4574350582; 53°02′58″N 2°48′34″W		1129940	Church of St Mary More images
Beeston Cast Iron Lock at SJ553598	Shropshire Union Canal, Tiverton	Canal lock	1828	18 October 1991	SJ5539559892; 53°08′04″N 2°40′05″W	The lock on the Shropshire Union Canal was designed by Thomas Telford. It is unique in that its sides are lined with cast iron plates to hold back sand and marshland. The bottom gates are wooden; the upper gates are steel. Crossing the tail of the lock is an iron footbridge. The lock is also a scheduled monument.	1240680	Beeston Cast Iron Lock at SJ553598 More images
Church of St Peter	Waverton	Church	16th century	1 March 1967	SJ4618063355; 53°09′51″N 2°48′18″W		1135747	Church of St Peter More images
Hefferston Grange (part of the Grange Hospital)	Weaverham	Country house	1741	18 July 1986	SJ6039973475; 53°15′24″N 2°35′42″W	This was built as a country house, incorporating parts of an earlier house, and was enlarged in the 1770s. During the 20th century it was used as a hospital for the treatment of tuberculosis, and has since been converted into apartments. The building is in early Georgian style, and is constructed in brick with stone dressings and a slate roof. The windows are sashes. Internally, some of the rooms have stucco decoration in Rococo style.	1287121	Hefferston Grange (part of the Grange Hospital) More images
Vale Royal Abbey	Whitegate and Marton	Abbey	1277	11 October 1949	SJ6387469861; 53°13′29″N 2°32′33″W	Once the largest Cistercian abbey in England, much of it was demolished after the Dissolution of the Monasteries when it was converted into a house. The building was extended from 1833 by Edward Blore, and more work was carried out from 1860 by John Douglas. It has since been converted partly into a golf club house, and partly into apartments. The land on which the abbey stood is a scheduled monument.	1160862	Vale Royal Abbey More images
St Luke's Church	Whitley	Church	Late 16th century (probable)	8 January 1970	SJ6143678869; 53°18′19″N 2°34′49″W	Rebuilt on the site of an earlier church, the roof was added in the 17th century, and the church was much restored during the 19th century. It is constructed in brick with sandstone dressings, and has a slate roof. At the east end is an apse, and at the northwest is a stone bell turret with a slate spire containing one bell.	1139134	St Luke's Church More images
Tirley Garth and entrance courtyard walls	Willington	House	1906–c.1914	8 November 1985	SJ5449966269; 53°11′29″N 2°40′52″W		1330306	Tirley Garth and entrance courtyard walls More images
Trafford Hall with attached service wing and carriage house	Wimbolds Trafford	House	1756	1 June 1967	SJ4511772162; 53°14′36″N 2°49′21″W		1145900	Trafford Hall with attached service wing and carriage house More images
Barn c.15 yards to west of Twelve Acres Farmhouse	Wimboldsley	Barn	Early 17th century	12 March 1986	SJ6801763286; 53°09′57″N 2°28′47″W	Altered later, the barn is built partly in timber framing with rendered infill, and partly in brick, with a slate roof. The building is in two storeys, with a north front of nine bays. Features include doorways, pilaster buttresses, casement windows, and diamond-shaped breathers.	1160751	Barn c.15 yards to west of Twelve Acres Farmhouse
Lea Hall	Wimboldsley	House	Late 17th–early 18th century	3 January 1967	SJ6803464146; 53°10′25″N 2°28′47″W	A former country house, later divided into flats. It is constructed in brick with ashlar dressings and a tile roof. It is in two storeys, with an attic and a basement. The symmetrical entrance front is in five bays. The central bay projects forward and contains a doorway with a swan's nest pediment decorated with scrolls, and a crest.	1160742	Lea Hall More images
St Chad's Church	Over, Winsford	Church	14th century (probable)	11 October 1949	SJ6501965098; 53°10′54″N 2°31′30″W	Constructed in sandstone, the church was remodelled in 1543. Restorations and additions were made in 1829, 1868–78, 1897–98, 1904–05, and 1926. Most of the church, including the west tower, is in Perpendicular style, except for the east window, which is in Decorated style.	1139180	St Chad's Church More images
Base and part shaft of Roodeye Cross	Chester Racecourse	Boundary stone	13th century	23 July 1998	SJ4017065845; 53°11′10″N 2°53′44″W		1375954	Base and part shaft of Roodeye Cross More images
Bluecoat School and former Chapel of St John Baptist	Chester	Charity school	1717	28 July 1955	SJ4038166701; 53°11′38″N 2°53′33″W		1375966	Bluecoat School and former Chapel of St John Baptist More images
Castle House, Castle Street	Chester	Town house	Late 16th century	28 July 1955	SJ4053665904; 53°11′12″N 2°53′24″W		1376121	Castle House, Castle Street More images
Chester College Chapel	Chester	Collegiate chapel	1844–47	10 January 1972	SJ4021267244; 53°11′55″N 2°53′42″W		1375741	Chester College Chapel More images
Chester Leadworks and Shot Tower	Boughton, Chester	Shot tower	1799	12 October 1981	SJ4143666704; 53°11′38″N 2°52′36″W		1375860	Chester Leadworks and Shot Tower More images
Chester Railway Station	Chester	Railway station	1847–48	31 July 1970	SJ4122667008; 53°11′48″N 2°52′48″W		1375937	Chester Railway Station More images
Church of St Marys	Handbridge	Parish church	1885–87	10 January 1972	SJ4069265462; 53°10′58″N 2°53′15″W		1375848	Church of St Marys More images
St Nicholas' Church	Burton	Parish church	1721	27 December 1962	SJ3172374343; 53°15′42″N 3°01′30″W	The church incorporates a chapel dating from 1380, and the chancel was rebuilt in 1870. It is built in sandstone and has a slate roof. The church consists of a continuous nave and chancel, a north aisle, a north vestry and a west tower. The tower is in four stages and has a plain parapet and a clock face, the clock having only one hand.	1387811	St Nicholas' Church More images
Church of St Paul	Boughton	Parish church	1876	10 January 1972	SJ4180766444; 53°11′30″N 2°52′16″W		1375705	Church of St Paul More images
Frederick Coplestone Memorial	Overleigh New Cemetery, Handbridge	Gravestone	1934	5 August 2002	SJ4034965082; 53°10′45″N 2°53′34″W		1350324	Frederick Coplestone Memorial
Equestrian Statue of Stapleton Cotton Viscount Combermere	Chester	Statue	1865	10 January 1972	SJ4038665865; 53°11′10″N 2°53′32″W		1376255	Equestrian Statue of Stapleton Cotton Viscount Combermere More images
Former premises of Trustee Savings Bank, Grosvenor Street	Chester	Bank (financial)	1851–53	10 January 1972	SJ4045265932; 53°11′13″N 2°53′29″W		1376260	Former premises of Trustee Savings Bank, Grosvenor Street More images
Former Rectory and Garden Railing	Chester	Vicarage	c.1750	28 July 1955	SJ4094666245; 53°11′23″N 2°53′02″W		1375975	Former Rectory and Garden Railing More images
Gamull House	Chester	Timber-framed house	Medieval	28 July 1955	SJ4060465928; 53°11′13″N 2°53′20″W		1376310	Gamull House More images
Hooton Lodge with screen wall and gates	Hooton	Gate	c.1788	26 September 1963	SJ3670877421; 53°17′23″N 2°56′58″W		1330389	Hooton Lodge with screen wall and gates More images
Kings Buildings	King Street, Chester	Apartment	1775	28 July 1955	SJ4027466568; 53°11′33″N 2°53′39″W		1376291	Kings Buildings More images
Little Abbey Gateway	Chester	Gate	14th century	28 July 1955	SJ4046766561; 53°11′33″N 2°53′28″W		1376368	Little Abbey Gateway More images
Newton Hall	Chester	Country house	c.1700	8 May 1950	SJ4168368360; 53°12′32″N 2°52′24″W		1375881	Upload Photo
Nos 2 (Street) and 1 (Row)	Bridge St., Chester	Apartment	1888	10 January 1972	SJ4053566272; 53°11′24″N 2°53′24″W		1376055	Nos 2 (Street) and 1 (Row) More images
Nos. 2–8 (Street) and Nos. 2-6 and 8 (part) (Row), Bridge St. and Nos. 1 and 3 (Street) and No. 1 (Row), Watergate St.	Chester	Town house	1892	10 January 1972	SJ4050866259; 53°11′23″N 2°53′26″W		1376056	Nos. 2–8 (Street) and Nos. 2-6 and 8 (part) (Row), Bridge St. and Nos. 1 and 3 (Street) and No. 1 (Row), Watergate St. More images
No.11 (Street) and No. 11 (Row) (Lowe)	Bridge St, Chester	Town house/Shop	Early–mid-14th century	10 January 1972	SJ4054666253; 53°11′23″N 2°53′24″W		1376062	No.11 (Street) and No. 11 (Row) (Lowe) More images
Nos. 15, 17 and 19 (Street and Row)	Bridge St., Chester	Town house	Early–mid-14th century	28 July 1955	SJ4055666241; 53°11′23″N 2°53′23″W		1376066	Nos. 15, 17 and 19 (Street and Row) More images
No. 21 (Street) and No. 27 (Row)	Bridge St., Chester	Galleried row house	Mid-17th century	28 July 1955	SJ4045566247; 53°11′23″N 2°53′29″W		1376428	No. 21 (Street) and No. 27 (Row) More images
No. 23 (Street) and No 27 (Row)	Bridge St., Chester	Town house	1804	10 January 1972	SJ4055866227; 53°11′22″N 2°53′23″W		1376072	No. 23 (Street) and No 27 (Row) More images
St Michael's Buildings – Nos. 31, 33 and 35 (Street) and Nos. 37 and 39 (Row)	Bridge St., Chester	Chester Rows	1909–11	10 January 1972	SJ4057266200; 53°11′21″N 2°53′22″W	The buildings were first completed in 1910 for the 2nd Duke of Westminster. They were designed by W. T. Lockwood.	1376077	St Michael's Buildings – Nos. 31, 33 and 35 (Street) and Nos. 37 and 39 (Row) More images
No. 32 (Street) and No 30 (Row)	Bridge St., Chester	Apartment	Medieval, 1811 and early and late C20	10 January 1972	SJ4052366189; 53°11′21″N 2°53′25″W		1376078	No. 32 (Street) and No 30 (Row) More images
No. 36 (Street) and No. 34 (Row)	Bridge St., Chester	Timber-framed house	Late 16th century	10 January 1972	SJ4052066176; 53°11′21″N 2°53′25″W		1376080	No. 36 (Street) and No. 34 (Row) More images
No. 43 (Street) and No 49 (Row)	Bridge St., Chester	Jettied house	Mid-17th century	28 July 1955	SJ4057166166; 53°11′20″N 2°53′22″W		1376089	No. 43 (Street) and No 49 (Row) More images
No. 57 (Street) and Nos. 63 and 65 (Row)	Bridge St., Chester	Apartment	Early 19th century	10 January 1972	SJ4057566130; 53°11′19″N 2°53′22″W		1376104	No. 57 (Street) and Nos. 63 and 65 (Row) More images
No. 4 (Street) and No. 2 (Row)	Eastgate St., Chester	Town house	1888	23 May 1967	SJ4054066272; 53°11′24″N 2°53′24″W		1376209	No. 4 (Street) and No. 2 (Row) More images
Boot Inn, No. 17 (Street) and No. 9 (Row)	Eastgate St., Chester	Galleried row	Mid-17th century	28 July 1955	SJ4058766326; 53°11′25″N 2°53′22″W		1376216	Boot Inn, No. 17 (Street) and No. 9 (Row) More images
No. 26 (Street) and No. 32 (Row), Eastgate St.	Chester	Galleried row	17th century	28 July 1955	SJ4060766280; 53°11′24″N 2°53′20″W		1376230	No. 26 (Street) and No. 32 (Row), Eastgate St. More images
National Westminster Bank – No. 33 (Street)	Eastgate St., Chester	Bank (financial)	1859–60	23 May 1967	SJ4063466342; 53°11′26″N 2°53′19″W		1376236	National Westminster Bank – No. 33 (Street) More images
No. 35 (Street), Eastgate St.	Chester	Terrace	1895–99	23 May 1967	SJ4064866367; 53°11′27″N 2°53′18″W		1376389	No. 35 (Street), Eastgate St. More images
Nos. 5, 7 and 9 (Street)	Northgate St., Chester	Apartment	1900	10 January 1972	SJ4051866334; 53°11′26″N 2°53′25″W		1376336	Nos. 5, 7 and 9 (Street) More images
Nos. 21 and 23 (Street)	Northgate St., Chester	Apartment	1897	28 July 1955	SJ4051066373; 53°11′27″N 2°53′26″W		1376344	Nos. 21 and 23 (Street) More images
No. 25 (Street)	Northgate St., Chester	Restaurant	1903	10 January 1972	SJ4050566379; 53°11′27″N 2°53′26″W		1376346	No. 25 (Street) More images
Number 26 (Street and Row)	Northgate St., Chester	Town house	c.1710	28 July 1955	SJ4044266276; 53°11′24″N 2°53′29″W		1376433	Number 26 (Street and Row) More images
Dublin Packet Public House – Nos. 27, 29 and 31 (Street)	Northgate St., Chester	Public house	Early 19th century	10 January 1972	SJ4050466385; 53°11′27″N 2°53′26″W		1376348	Dublin Packet Public House – Nos. 27, 29 and 31 (Street) More images
Pied Bull Hotel – No. 57 (Street)	Northgate St., Chester	Inn	17th century	28 July 1955	SJ4042166587; 53°11′34″N 2°53′31″W		1376356	Pied Bull Hotel – No. 57 (Street) More images
Room – No 10 (Street) and No. 8 (Row)	Watergate St., Chester	Timber-framed house	Early 17th century	28 July 1955	SJ4047966279; 53°11′24″N 2°53′27″W	Whistles clothes shop	1376423	Room – No 10 (Street) and No. 8 (Row) More images
No. 22 (Street) and (Row)	Watergate St., Chester	Galleried row house	17th century	28 July 1955	SJ4045666280; 53°11′24″N 2°53′29″W	Grosvenor Antiques	1376429	No. 22 (Street) and (Row) More images
No. 24 (Street and Row)	Watergate St., Chester	Apartment	14th century	28 July 1955	SJ4044866279; 53°11′24″N 2°53′29″W	Eva shop	1376431	No. 24 (Street and Row) More images
Nos. 38, 40 and 42 (Street) and Nos. 34, 36 and 38 (Row)	Watergate St., Chester	Galleried row house	Early–mid-14th century	28 July 1955	SJ4041066266; 53°11′23″N 2°53′31″W	Katies Tea Rooms (38), The Antique Shop (40), Corbett Sports (42)	1376437	Nos. 38, 40 and 42 (Street) and Nos. 34, 36 and 38 (Row) More images
No. 68 (Street)	Watergate St., Chester	Town house	1729	28 July 1955	SJ4033966247; 53°11′23″N 2°53′35″W	Baron Fine Art	1376448	No. 68 (Street) More images
Number 5, Bridge Place with rear dwelling and attached wall	Chester	House	Mid-18th century	28 July 1955	SJ4068265861; 53°11′10″N 2°53′16″W		1376052	Number 5, Bridge Place with rear dwelling and attached wall More images
Oddfellows Hall	Chester	Town house	1676	28 July 1955	SJ4057166025; 53°11′16″N 2°53′22″W		1376299	Oddfellows Hall More images
Old Newgate	Chester	Town gate	Early 17th century	28 July 1955	SJ4074466151; 53°11′20″N 2°53′13″W		1376378	Old Newgate More images
Part of a Roman quay wall opposite St Martins Lodge	Chester	Wall	2nd century Roman	23 July 1998	SJ4021465945; 53°11′13″N 2°53′41″W		1375955	Part of a Roman quay wall opposite St Martins Lodge More images
Part of City Wall from Bridgegate to County Hall (not included)	Chester	Wall	1702–08	28 July 1955	SJ4065365815; 53°11′09″N 2°53′18″W		1376173	Part of City Wall from Bridgegate to County Hall (not included)
Part of Roman quay wall south of lateral steps from Nuns Road (steps not included)	Chester	Wall	2nd century Roman	23 July 1998	SJ4022765911; 53°11′12″N 2°53′41″W		1375956	Upload Photo
Sedan House	Chester	Terraced house	c.1780	28 July 1955	SJ4012766257; 53°11′23″N 2°53′46″W		1376413	Sedan House More images
Shipgate House	Chester	Town house	17th century	28 July 1955	SJ4063665812; 53°11′09″N 2°53′19″W		1376399	Shipgate House More images
Southern General Service Hangar (Hangar 1), Hooton Park Aerodrome	Hooton Park	Aircraft hangar	1917	6 May 1988	SJ3731478782; 53°18′07″N 2°56′27″W		1242397	Upload Photo
Central General Service Hangar (Hangar 2), Hooton Park Aerodrome	Hooton Park	Hangar	1917	6 May 1988	SJ3727278855; 53°18′10″N 2°56′29″W		1075378	Central General Service Hangar (Hangar 2), Hooton Park Aerodrome
Northern General Service Hangar (Hangar 3), Hooton Park Aerodrome	Hooton Park	Hangar	c.1917	6 May 1988	SJ3723078928; 53°18′12″N 2°56′31″W		1075377	Upload Photo
The Friars	Chester	House	c.1740	28 July 1955	SJ4039366143; 53°11′19″N 2°53′32″W		1376494	The Friars More images
The Georgian House	Chester	Town house	Mid–late 18th century	28 July 1955	SJ4050065923; 53°11′12″N 2°53′26″W		1376118	The Georgian House More images
The Hermitage	Chester	House	1363	28 July 1955	SJ4114265882; 53°11′11″N 2°52′51″W		1375947	The Hermitage More images
The Old Kings Head Hotel	Chester	Jettied house	15th century	28 July 1955	SJ4059165952; 53°11′13″N 2°53′21″W		1376307	The Old Kings Head Hotel More images
The Old Palace	Chester	Bishop's palace	1751	28 July 1955	SJ4084766064; 53°11′17″N 2°53′07″W		1375949	The Old Palace More images
Town Hall	Chester	Town hall	1865–69	10 January 1972	SJ4045066446; 53°11′29″N 2°53′29″W		1376371	Town Hall More images
Tudor House	Chester	Galleried row house	1603	28 July 1955	SJ4061466014; 53°11′15″N 2°53′20″W		1376301	Tudor House More images
Walmoor House	Chester	House	1896	10 January 1972	SJ4207765782; 53°11′08″N 2°52′01″W		1375760	Walmoor House More images
Watergate House	Chester	Town house	1820	10 January 1972	SJ4022066191; 53°11′21″N 2°53′41″W		1376469	Watergate House More images
Willaston Old Hall	Willaston	Manor house	1558	27 December 1962	SJ3301977667; 53°17′29″N 3°00′18″W		1387666	Willaston Old Hall More images
3–6 Abbey Green	Chester	House	20th century	28 July 1955	SJ4050866638; 53°11′36″N 2°53′26″W		1376019	3–6 Abbey Green More images
6–11 Grosvenor Park Road	Chester	Row	1872	10 January 1972	SJ4117966407; 53°11′28″N 2°52′50″W		1375834	6–11 Grosvenor Park Road More images
11 White Friars	Chester	Town house	Early 18th century	10 January 1972	SJ4049266081; 53°11′18″N 2°53′26″W		1376478	11 White Friars More images
1 Stanley Place	Chester	Terrace	c.1780	28 July 1955	SJ4017666264; 53°11′23″N 2°53′44″W		1376404	1 Stanley Place More images
3, Stanley Street	Chester	Town house	1781	28 July 1955	SJ4017466306; 53°11′25″N 2°53′44″W		1376416	3, Stanley Street More images
1 and 2, Abbey Square	Chester	Town house	1821–22	28 July 1955	SJ4050266502; 53°11′31″N 2°53′26″W		1376023	1 and 2, Abbey Square More images
3 Abbey Square	Chester	Town house	1771–72	28 July 1955	SJ4049666511; 53°11′31″N 2°53′27″W		1376024	3 Abbey Square More images
Nos 4, 5 and 6, Abbey Square	Chester	Town house	c.1760	28 July 1955	SJ4049166530; 53°11′32″N 2°53′27″W		1376025	Nos 4, 5 and 6, Abbey Square More images
Nos 7 and 8, Abbey Square with attached Walls	Chester	Town house	1754–60	28 July 1955	SJ4049966552; 53°11′33″N 2°53′26″W		1376026	Nos 7 and 8, Abbey Square with attached Walls More images
No 9, Abbey Square with attached Walls	Chester	Town house	1754–60	28 July 1955	SJ4051466557; 53°11′33″N 2°53′26″W		1376027	No 9, Abbey Square with attached Walls More images
Number 10, Abbey Square with attached Walls	Chester	Town house	1754–60	28 July 1955	SJ4052466560; 53°11′33″N 2°53′25″W		1376028	Number 10, Abbey Square with attached Walls More images
Number 11, Abbey Square and Attached Walls	Chester	Town house	c.1760	28 July 1955	SJ4053266563; 53°11′33″N 2°53′25″W		1376029	Number 11, Abbey Square and Attached Walls More images
5–11 Abbey Street	Chester	House	Late 19th century	28 July 1955	SJ4059766549; 53°11′33″N 2°53′21″W		1376039	5–11 Abbey Street More images
Crewood Hall	Kingsley	Country house	Late 16th century	14 December 1978	SJ5662976154; 53°16′50″N 2°39′07″W	Basically a timber-framed country house, with a two-storey porch added in 1623. Much of it was encased in brick in the 19th century when the house was also extended. It is a two-storey house, consisting of a hall with two cross wings and the porch.	1253462	Upload Photo

== See also ==
- Grade I listed buildings in Cheshire West and Chester
- Grade II* listed buildings in Cheshire
  - Grade II* listed buildings in Cheshire East
  - Grade II* listed buildings in Warrington
  - Grade II* listed buildings in Halton (borough)
