= Hockenhull =

Former civil parish in Cheshire, England

Coordinates: 53.184°N 2.787°W

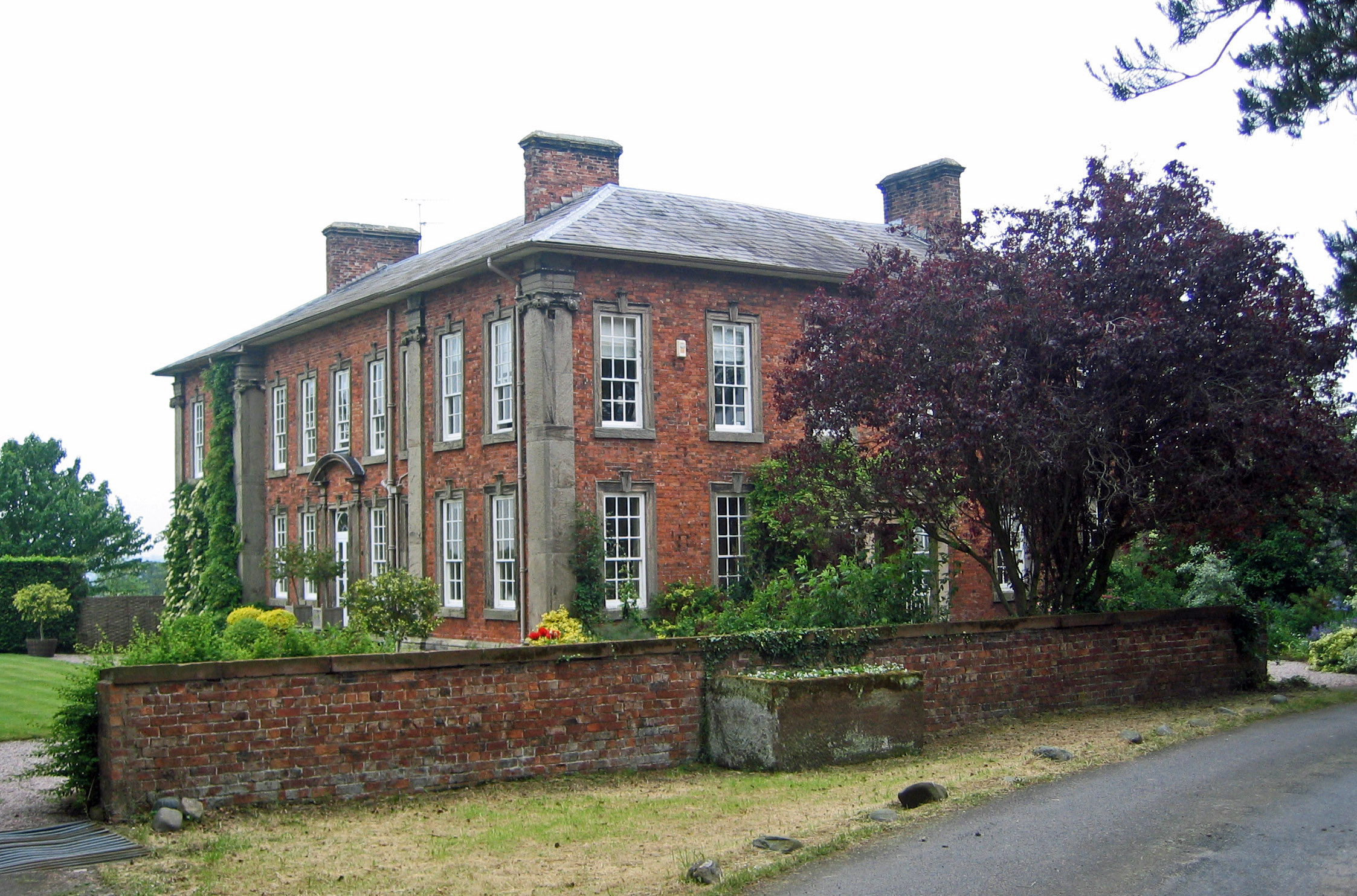
- Hockenhull Hall

- Location within Cheshire
- Population: 19 (2001)
- OS grid reference: SJ4765
- Civil parish: Tarvin
- Unitary authority: Cheshire West and Chester
- Ceremonial county: Cheshire
- Region: North West
- Country: England
- Sovereign state: United Kingdom
- Post town: CHESTER
- Postcode district: CH3
- Dialling code: 01829
- Police: Cheshire
- Fire: Cheshire
- Ambulance: North West
- UK Parliament: Chester South and Eddisbury

Hockenhull is a former civil parish, now in the parish of Tarvin, in the borough of Cheshire West and Chester and ceremonial county of Cheshire in England. In 2001 it had a population of 19. Hockenhull was formerly a township, in 1866 Hockenhull became a civil parish, on 1 April 2015 the parish was abolished and merged with Tarvin.

The parish contained one listed building, Hockenhull Hall, which is designated by English Heritage at Grade II*. This grade is the middle of the three gradings given to listed buildings and is applied to "particularly important buildings of more than special interest".
