= Watergate House, Chester =

Watergate House
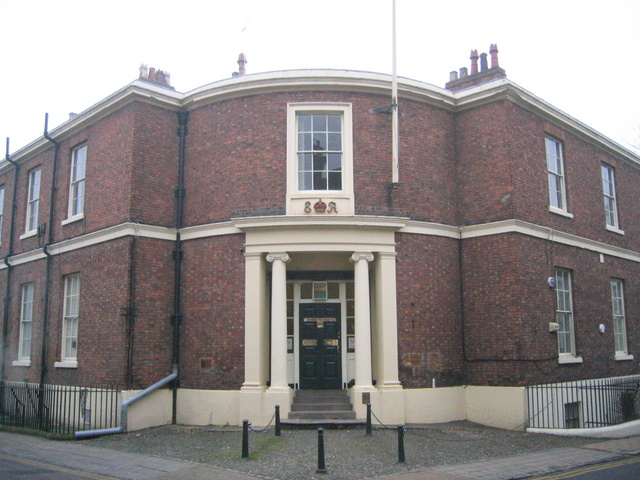
- Entrance to Watergate House

- Location in Cheshire
- 53.1894°N 2.8962°W
- Location: Watergate Street, Chester, Cheshire, England
- OS grid reference: SJ 402 662

History
- Built: 1820
- Built for: Henry Potts

Site notes
- Architect: Thomas Harrison
- Architectural style: Neoclassical

Listed Building – Grade II*
- Designated: 10 January 1972
- Reference no.: 1376469

Watergate House is in Watergate Street, Chester, Cheshire, England. It is recorded in the National Heritage List for England as a designated Grade II* listed building.

== History ==
Watergate House was built in 1820 as a town house for Henry Potts, Clerk of the Peace for the County of Cheshire. It was designed by Thomas Harrison. In 1907 it became the headquarters of Western Command. After the command moved to the new Command Headquarters in Queen's Park Road in 1938, Watergate House then became the headquarters of the Cheshire Community Council, and has since been used as offices.

== Architecture ==
The house is constructed in Flemish bond brown brick with stone dressings and a grey slate roof. It has two storeys plus a basement. The plan of the main block is square, with the entrance in a recessed convex quadrant at the northeast corner. A service wing projects to the south. Six curved steps lead up to a curved eight-panel door with four-pane sidelights and a three-pane overlight. The door is surrounded by an Ionic doorcase. Above this, in the upper storey, is a twelve-pane sash window in an architrave, the bottom panel of which is inscribed with aa crown flanked by initials "E" and "R". Both storeys on the east and north sides contain three twelve-pane sash windows. On the west (garden) front is a central two-storey bay window containing sash windows, flanked by sash windows in each storey. The entrance door leads through a domed circular lobby to an octagonal central hall.

== See also ==
- Grade II* listed buildings in Cheshire West and Chester
- List of works by Thomas Harrison
