= Sedan House, Chester =

Sedan House
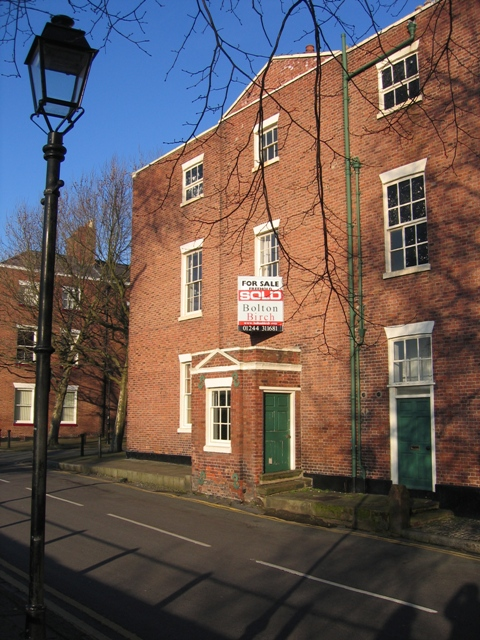
- Sedan House, showing the porch

- Location in Cheshire
- 53.1900°N 2.8975°W
- Location: 13 and 13B Stanley Place, Chester, Cheshire, England
- OS grid reference: SJ 401 663

History
- Built: c. 1780

Site notes
- Architectural style: Georgian

Listed Building – Grade II*
- Designated: 28 July 1955
- Reference no.: 1376413

The Sedan House is at 13 and 13B Stanley Place, Chester, Cheshire, England. It is recorded in the National Heritage List for England as a designated Grade II* listed building. The house is sited on the corner of Stanley Place and City Walls Road. It takes its name from the porch on City Walls Road that was used for those being carried in a sedan to enter the house.

== History ==
Stanley Place, including the Sedan House, was built in about 1780 on land formerly occupied by the Franciscan and Dominican friaries. Stanley Place remains as one of Chester's few unaltered Georgian streets.

== Architecture ==
Sedan House is constructed in brown brick on a painted stone plinth, with a grey slate roof. It has three storeys. The windows are sashes. Extending from the house on the side of City Walls Road is a single-storey porch. This has two doors, one on the north side and one on the south. On the west side is a nine-pane window. Leading up from the north side is a single stone step, with two steps to the south. It is thought that this is the only surviving porch of this type in the northwest of England.

== See also ==
- Grade II* listed buildings in Cheshire West and Chester
