= St Michael's Buildings, Chester =

Architecture in Cheshire, England

Coordinates: 53.1895°N 2.8911°W

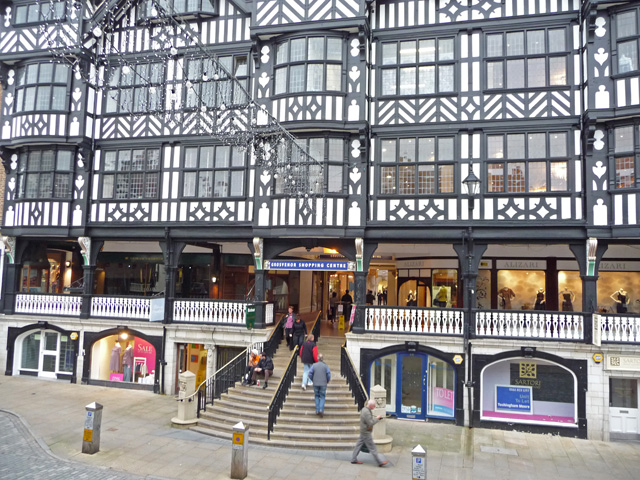
Bridge Street façade

St Michael's Buildings are on the east side of Bridge Street, Chester, Cheshire, England. They contain a section of Chester Rows, with shops at street level and along the Rows, and an arcade of shops stretching behind these to link with the Grosvenor Shopping Centre. The whole structure is recorded in the National Heritage List for England as a designated Grade II* listed building.

== History ==
The buildings were first completed in 1910 for the 2nd Duke of Westminster. They were designed by W. T. Lockwood. In the initial design, the Bridge Street façade was faced with cream and gold ceramic tiles (faience), with Baroque decoration. However, there was strong public opposition to the design because it was too much of a contrast from the Black-and-white Revival buildings that had been recently erected in the city. Following a petition from Chester City Council, and the Bishop of Chester, the duke was persuaded to remove the façade, and to replace it with timber framing. The entrance from Bridge Street was modified in 2000 when the steps were replaced.

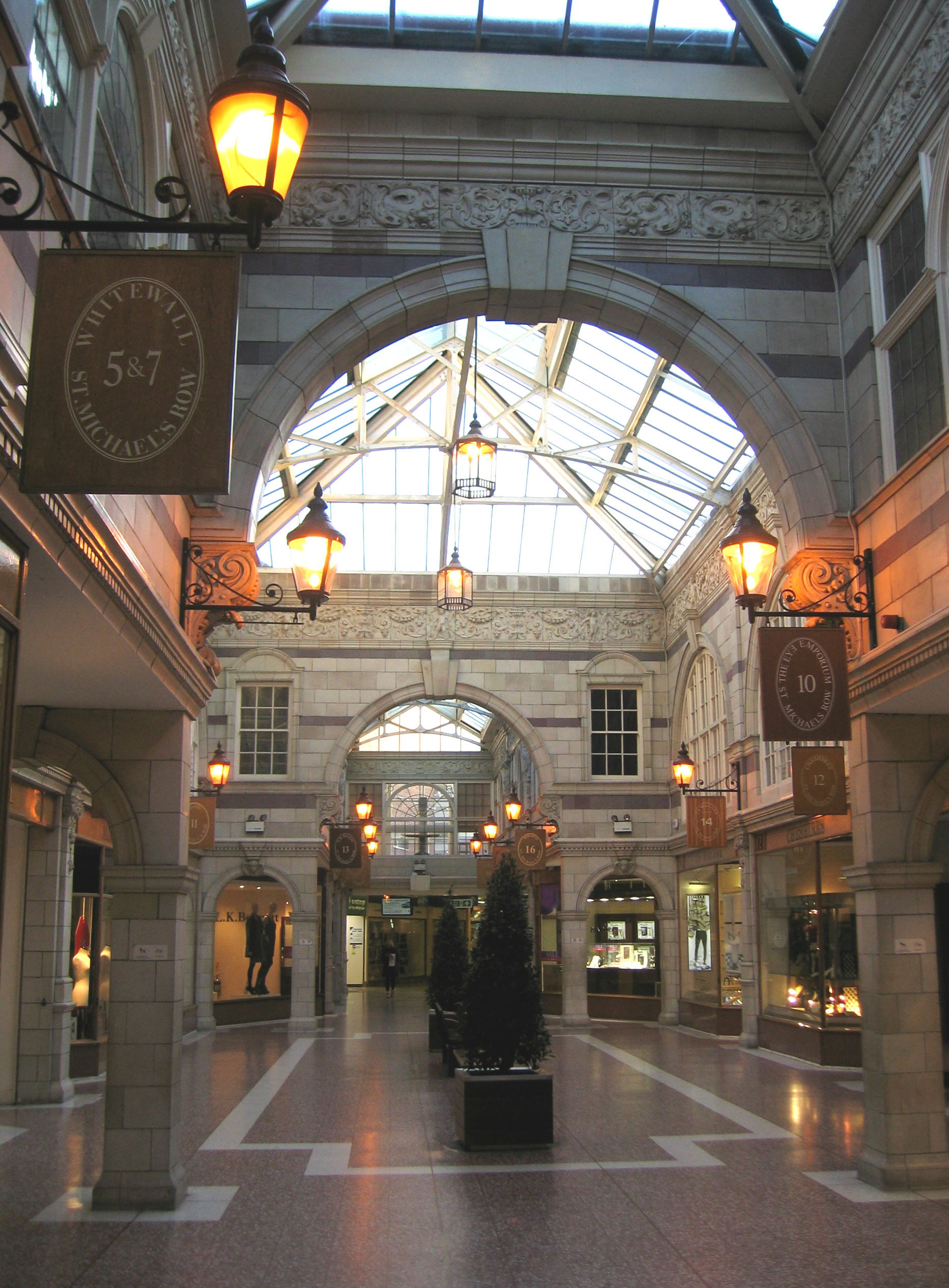
Interior of the arcade

== Architecture ==
The structure probably has a steel frame. The Bridge Street façade is mainly timber framed, with plaster panels, and some brick and faience decoration. It is roofed in green Westmorland slate. It is in five storeys, with five gables, and is expressed in an E-plan with three projecting bays. There are two shops at street level, two more at row level, and a further 20 in the arcade, most of which have modern fronts. The interior of the arcade is faced with faience.

== See also ==
- Grade II* listed buildings in Cheshire West and Chester
