= Tudor House, Chester =

Tudor House
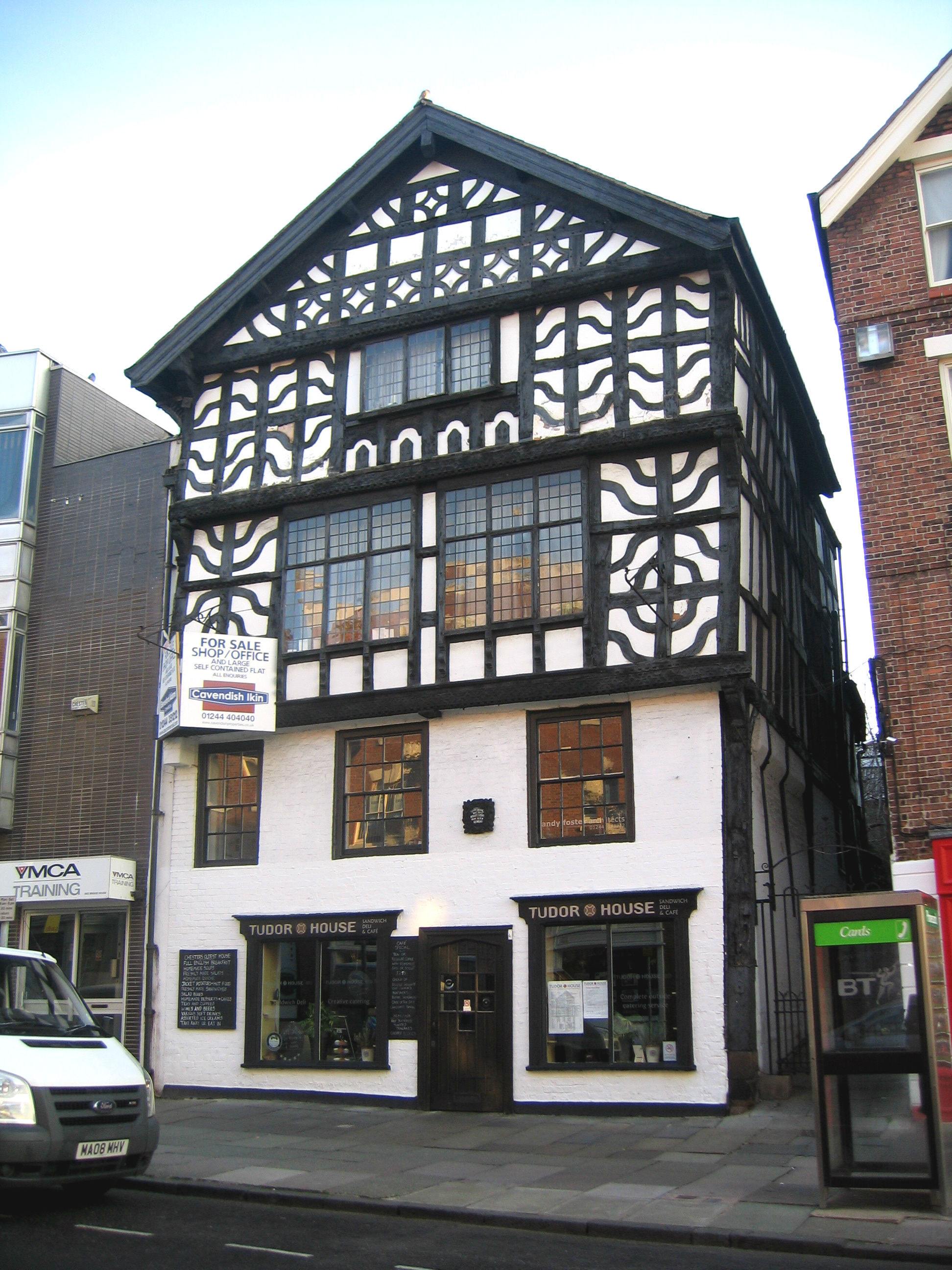
- Tudor House

- Location in Cheshire
- 53.1878°N 2.8903°W
- Location: 29 and 31 Lower Bridge Street, Chester, Cheshire, England
- OS grid reference: SJ 406 660

History
- Built: 1603 (probable)

Listed Building – Grade II*
- Designated: 28 July 1955
- Reference no.: 1376301

The Tudor House is a shop and house at 29 and 31 Lower Bridge Street, Chester, Cheshire, England. It is recorded in the National Heritage List for England as a designated Grade II* listed building.

== History ==
The house was built for a wealthy merchant. It was most likely built in 1603. Above the door is a plaque inscribed with the date 1503, but this is an error because the building has been dated to the early 17th century by dendrochronology. It was extended to the rear in the middle of the 17th century, and in 1728 it was rebuilt, enclosing the portion of the Row passing through its first floor. At street level are two undercrofts. In the past one undercroft was in use as a bakehouse, while the other formed part of the Britannia Inn. The building has subsequently been used as a café on the ground floor, with an apartment above it. The timber framing on the south side of the building was reconstructed in 1973–74.

== Architecture ==
Tudor House is constructed in sandstone, in brick, and in timber framing with plaster panels, and is roofed in slate. It has four storeys plus a cellar. The lower two storeys are in brick, with timber-framing above. The entrance door at street level is in a doorway with a Tudor arch, and on each side of it is a two-pane window. Above the windows are headboards inscribed "TUDOR" and "HOUSE". The first floor contains three casement windows. The two top storeys are both jettied and timber-framed. The third storey contains two three-light mullioned and transomed casement windows, with panels containing S-shaped braces on their outer sides. The top storey has one three-light mullioned window over four arched panels. To the side of it are panels containing S-shaped braces, and above it is a gable with lozenge- and S-shaped braces. The lower two storeys on the south side of the house are constructed in sandstone, with timber-framing above.

== See also ==
- Grade II* listed buildings in Cheshire West and Chester
