= Oddfellows' Hall, Chester =

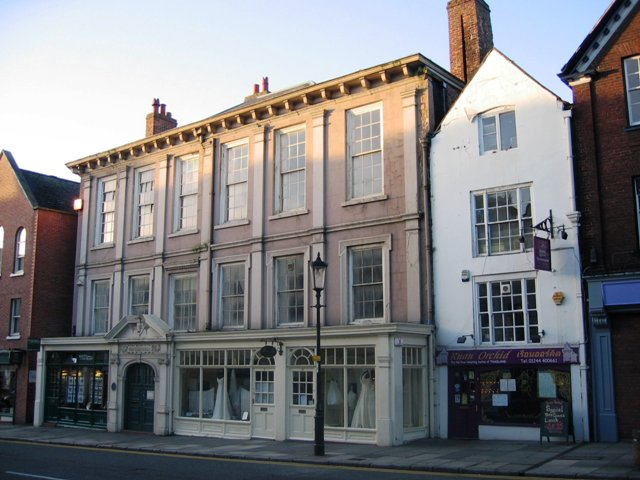
- Oddfellows' Hall

- Location in Cheshire
- 53.1897°N 2.8916°W
- Location: 16–24 Lower Bridge Street, Chester, Cheshire, England
- OS grid reference: SJ 406 660

History
- Built: 1676
- Built for: Lady Mary Calverley

Site notes
- Architectural style: Neoclassical

Listed Building – Grade II*
- Designated: 28 July 1955
- Reference no.: 1376299

Oddfellows' Hall, originally Bridge House is at 16–24 Lower Bridge Street, Chester, Cheshire, England. It is recorded in the National Heritage List for England as a designated Grade II* listed building.

== History ==
The hall was originally a town house built in 1676 for Lady Mary Calverley. She had petitioned the City Assembly for permission to demolish her house, which contained a section of the Chester Rows, and replace it with a new house. This was granted, but as it led to the loss of a portion of the Rows she was fined £20 (equivalent to £4,100 in 2025). It was the first building in central Chester to be designed in classical style. During the early 18th century the house was occupied by John Williams, a local attorney general. Since that time the building has been used for various purposes, including a school, a club, offices, and shops. The access to the building was altered in the late 19th century. Also in that century a sixth bay was added to the north, and in the later part of the century the ground floor was projected forward to incorporate shops. As of 2011 it is in use as a restaurant and hotel called Oddfellows Chester and a part of the Oddfellows hotel group of boutique hotels.

== Architecture ==
The building is constructed in brick, rendered at the front, and it has a grey slate roof. It is in three storeys and has six bays. On the street level, the third bay from the south has a projecting entrance porch. On each side of its arched doorway is a pilaster, and above the doorway is a broken pediment, over which is a frieze inscribed with ODDFELLOWS HALL. The other bays in the ground floor contain modern frontages. The first and second floor bays are linked and articulated by a colossal order formed of superposed Doric pilasters, and each bay contains a sash window. At the top of the building a cornice is supported on square brackets. The interior contains richly ornamented baroque decoration.

== See also ==
- Grade II* listed buildings in Cheshire West and Chester
