= Chester College Chapel =

Chester College Chapel (University of Chester)
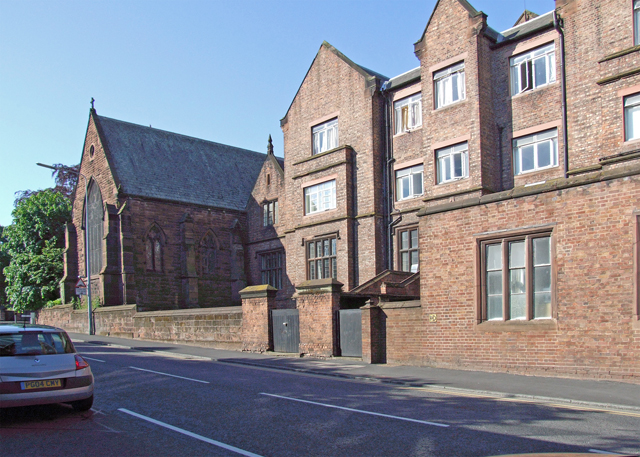
- The former Chester College with the chapel on the left

- Location in Cheshire
- 53.1989°N 2.8966°W
- Location: Parkgate Road, Chester, Cheshire, England
- OS grid reference: SJ 402 672

History
- Built: 1844–47
- Built for: Chester College

Site notes
- Architect: J. E. Gregan
- Architectural style: Gothic Revival

Listed Building – Grade II*
- Designated: 10 January 1972
- Reference no.: 1375741

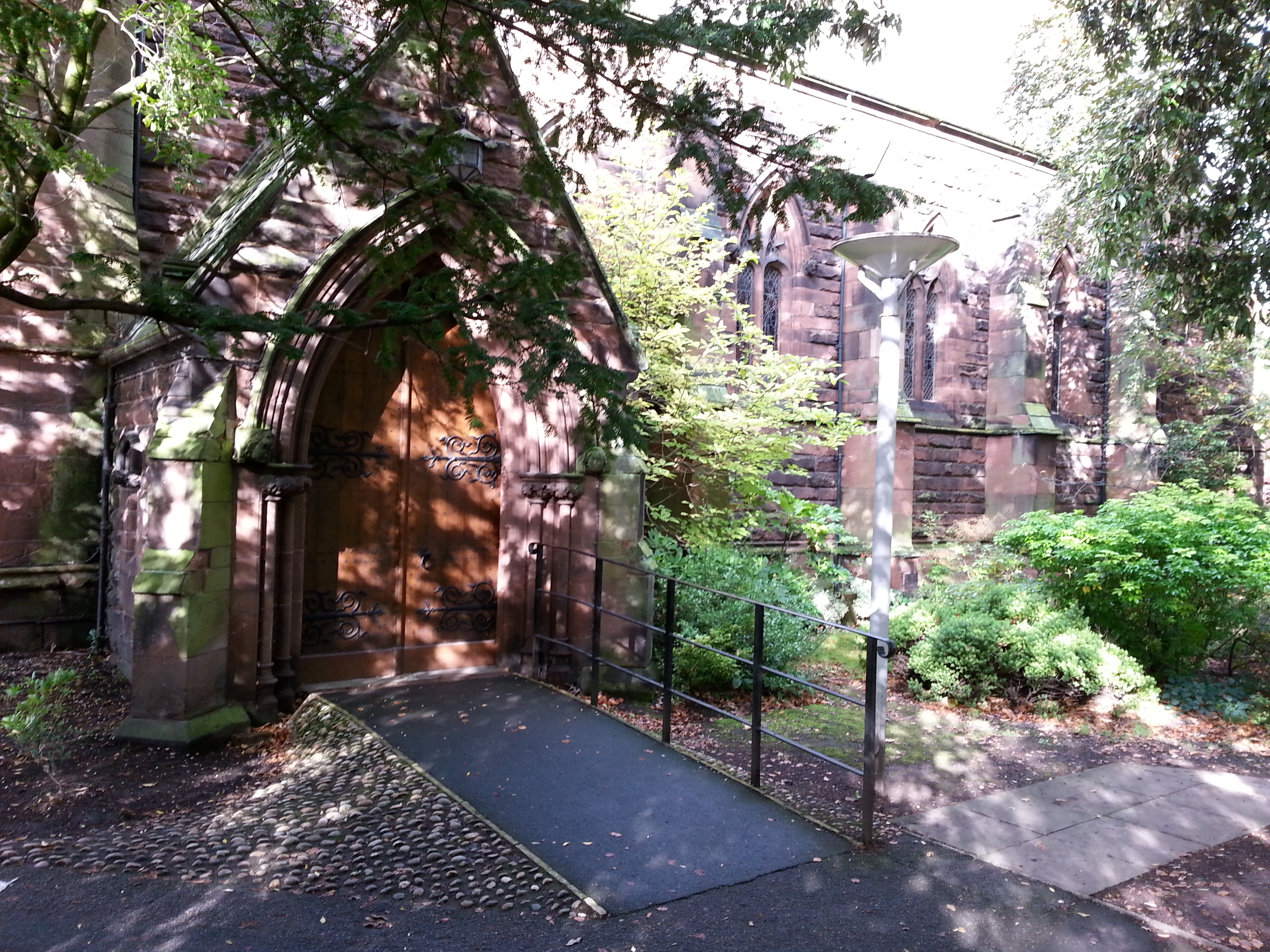
New entrance door

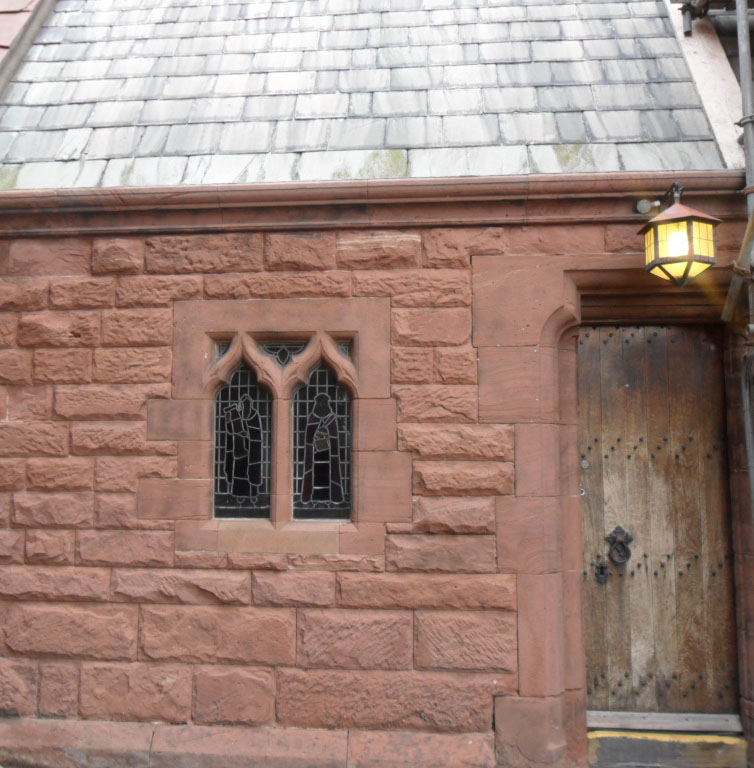
University Chapel at Chester Campus, Parkgate Road.

Chester College Chapel is on the corner of Cheyney Road and Parkgate Road in Chester, Cheshire, England. The chapel has been incorporated as part of the University of Chester. It is recorded in the National Heritage List for England as a designated Grade II* listed building.

== History ==
Chester College was built between 1839 and 1842 as the first purpose-built teacher training college in England. Its chapel was added between 1844 and 1847. The chapel was designed by the Manchester architect J. E. Gregan, and its construction was assisted by the students of the college, who helped to quarry and carve the stone, to carve the woodwork, and to work with the stained glass. The chapel has since been incorporated into the University of Chester.

== Architecture ==
The chapel is constructed in coursed red sandstone, with a Westmorland green slate roof. Its architectural style is Geometric. It has a rectangular plan, with north and south porches, and a southwest bellcote. The bellcote is slender and octagonal, with arched bell openings, and is surmounted by a crocketed spire. At the west end of the chapel is a four-light window, and there is a five-light east window. Inside the chapel is a tiered west gallery, The stalls face each other. Around the chapel is an oak dado inscribed with texts. The chapel is floored with encaustic tiles. The organ case is elaborate with carved tracery, and has three gables. It was built in 1856, and was designed by Revd T. N. Hutchinson. The church contains three copies of paintings by Old Masters, which were donated by the Duke of Westminster. The stained glass in the east window was designed by the students of the college. On the south side of the chapel are windows designed by Trena Cox between 1923 and 1962, by Wippell in 1964, and by Powells in 1952, depicting the students building the chapel. The west window dating from 1989 is by Penny Kemp-Jones. Inside the chapel is a memorial to Revd Arthur Rigg, the first principal of the college who served for 30 years, which was designed by J. S. Westmacott.

== See also ==
- Grade II* listed buildings in Cheshire West and Chester
