= St John's Rectory, Chester =

St John's Rectory
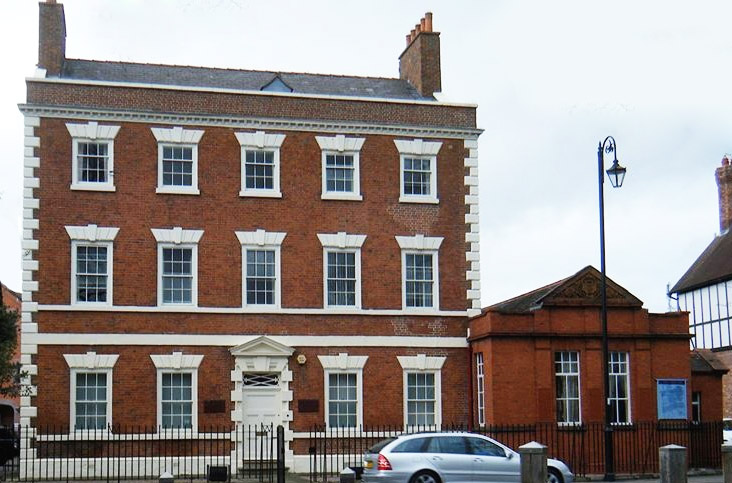

- Location in Cheshire
- 53.1900°N 2.8853°W
- Location: 3 Vicar's Lane, Chester, Cheshire, England
- OS grid reference: SJ 410 663

History
- Built: c. 1750
- Built for: St John's Church

Site notes
- Architectural style: Georgian

Listed Building – Grade II*
- Designated: 28 July 1955
- Reference no.: 1375975

St John's Rectory is at 3 Vicar's Lane, Chester, Cheshire, England. It is recorded in the National Heritage List for England as a designated Grade II* listed building.

== History ==
This was originally built in about 1750 as the rectory for St John's Church, which stands on the other side of Vicar's Lane. It continued to have this function until 1957. It was then used by the Grosvenor Club, following which it contains offices.

== Architecture ==
The rectory is constructed in brick with stone dressings, and it has a grey slate roof. It stands on a painted stone plinth, and at the corners are rusticated quoins. It has three storeys and its front is symmetrical in five bays. Between the ground and first floors are stone bands. Above the top floor windows is a modillion cornice, and a coped brick parapet. The entrance door in the central bay has a Gibbs surround with a pulvinated frieze and a pediment. In the other bays on the ground floor and all the bays in the middle floor contain twelve-pane sash windows, and in the top floor the sash windows have nine panes. All the windows have rusticated wedge lintels with projecting keystones. Inside the building is a six-flight open-well staircase with three column-on-vase balusters on each step.

== See also ==
- Grade II* listed buildings in Cheshire West and Chester
