= Eaton, west Cheshire =

Former civil parish in Cheshire, England

Eaton
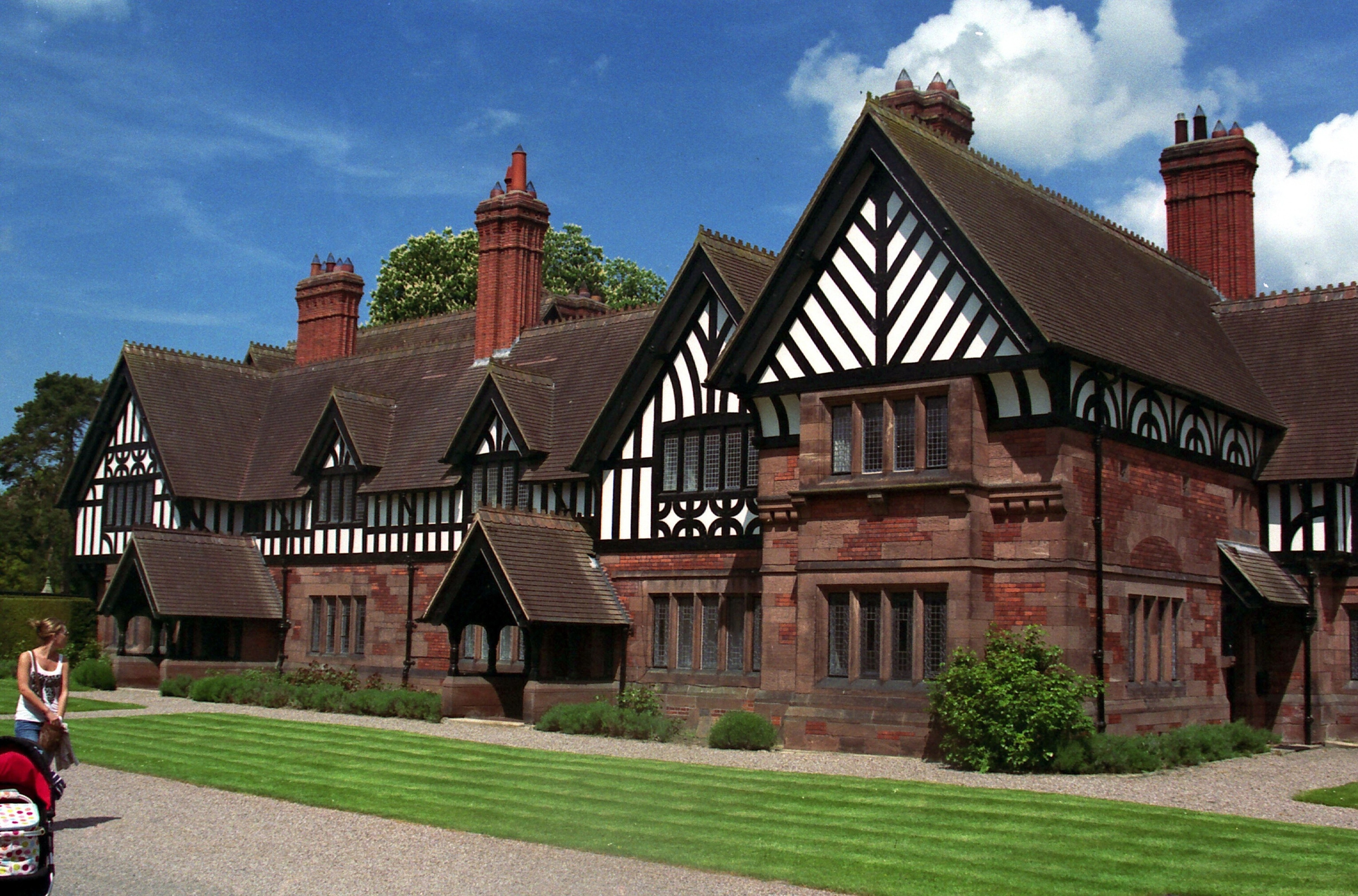

- Location within Cheshire
- Civil parish: Eaton and Eccleston; Poulton and Pulford
- Unitary authority: Cheshire West and Chester
- Ceremonial county: Cheshire
- Region: North West
- Country: England
- Sovereign state: United Kingdom
- UK Parliament: Chester South and Eddisbury

Eaton is a former civil parish, now in the parishes of Eaton and Eccleston and Poulton and Pulford, within the borough of Cheshire West and Chester and the ceremonial county of Cheshire in England. It had a population of 51 in 2001.

It is most notable for containing Eaton Hall, home of the Duke of Westminster.

Eaton was formerly a township in the parish of Eccleston, in 1866 Eaton became a separate civil parish, on 1 April 2015 the parish was merged with the adjacent parish Eccleston to form a new combined parish, "Eaton and Eccleston"; because of minor boundary changes, a small part also went to Poulton and Pulford.

== Governance ==
Eaton is represented by the Constituency of the Chester South and Eddisbury in the UK House of Commons. It is represented on Cheshire West and Chester Borough Council which holds its meetings at Chester Town Hall. Since 2015 local government in Eaton has been divided between two civil parishes:

- Eaton and Eccleston, governed by a seven-member parish council, with meetings held in the Eccleston Village Hall in the third week of January, May, July and October each year. There are also special meetings scheduled to deal with specific issues when needed.
- Poulton and Pulford, governed by a ten-member parish council, with meetings held in the Pulford Village Hall in the third week of January, May, July and October each year. There are also special meetings scheduled to deal with specific issues when needed.

== See also ==
- Listed buildings in Eaton, west Cheshire
