= St Mary's Church, Handbridge =

Coordinates: 53.1829°N 2.8889°W

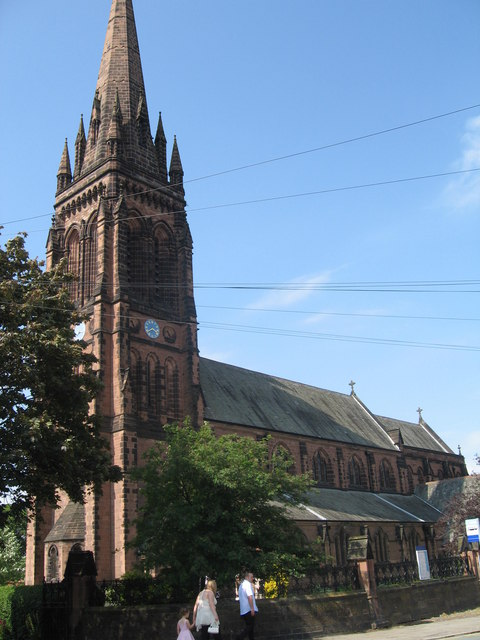
- St Mary's Church, Handbridge

- Location in Cheshire
- OS grid reference: SJ 406 655
- Location: Handbridge, Chester, Cheshire
- Country: England
- Denomination: Anglican
- Churchmanship: Broad church
- Website: www.stmaryschester.co.uk

History
- Status: Parish church

Architecture
- Functional status: Active
- Heritage designation: Grade II*
- Designated: 10 January 1972
- Architect(s): F. B. Wade, P. H. Lockwood
- Architectural type: Church
- Style: Gothic Revival
- Completed: 1887

Specifications
- Materials: Red sandstone, slate roofs

Administration
- Province: York
- Diocese: Chester
- Archdeaconry: Chester
- Deanery: Chester
- Parish: St Mary without the Walls, Chester

Clergy
- Rector: Revd Antony Dutton

St Mary's Church is located on Overleigh Road in Handbridge, an area south of the River Dee, in the city of Chester, Cheshire, England. It is also known as the Church of St Mary-without-the-Walls, which was to distinguish it from Church of St Mary-on-the-Hill across the River Dee within the city walls. The church is recorded in the National Heritage List for England as a designated Grade II* listed building. It is an active Anglican parish church in the diocese of Chester, the archdeaconry of Chester and the deanery of Chester.

== History ==
The church was built between 1885 and 1887 to a design by F. B. Wade for the 1st Duke of Westminster. A porch was added on the south face of the tower in 1914 which was designed by P. H. Lockwood.

== Architecture ==
=== Exterior ===
St Mary's is constructed in ashlar Waverton stone with dressings of Runcorn sandstone. It has Westmorland green slate roofs. The plan consists of a five-bay nave with a clerestory, a three-bay chancel, a chapel at the southeast, an organ chamber and a vestry. There are two porches, one on the south and one on the north. At the west end is a three-stage tower with a recessed spire. It has clock faces to the north, west and south, paired louvred bell-openings on each face, a machicolated parapet, two pinnacles at each corner, lucarnes to each cardinal face of the spire and a weathervane.

=== Interior ===
The baptistry is in the tower and has an encaustic tiled floor and a stone font with an oak cover. The stained glass in the baptistry is dated 1887 and is by Edward Frampton. It depicts Christ's baptism. In the baptistry is a portrait memorial dated 1900 to the first Duke of Westminster. The nave is floored with wood blocks. There are three steps up to the chancel with wrought iron rails. The chancel has a mosaic floor. The southeast chapel has a wrought iron screen. The pulpit and lectern are in oak. To the north of the chancel is a sedilia. The east window is probably also by Frampton. The reredos was designed by Frederic Shields and made in cloisonné by Clement Heaton. There is a ring of eight bells which were cast by Mears and Stainbank at the Whitechapel Bell Foundry in 1887.

== External features ==
The walls, gates and railings of the churchyard were also designed by F. B. Wade for the first Duke of Westminster in 1887, and are listed Grade II.

== See also ==
- Grade II* listed buildings in Cheshire West and Chester
