= Old King's Head Hotel, Chester =

Old King's Head Hotel
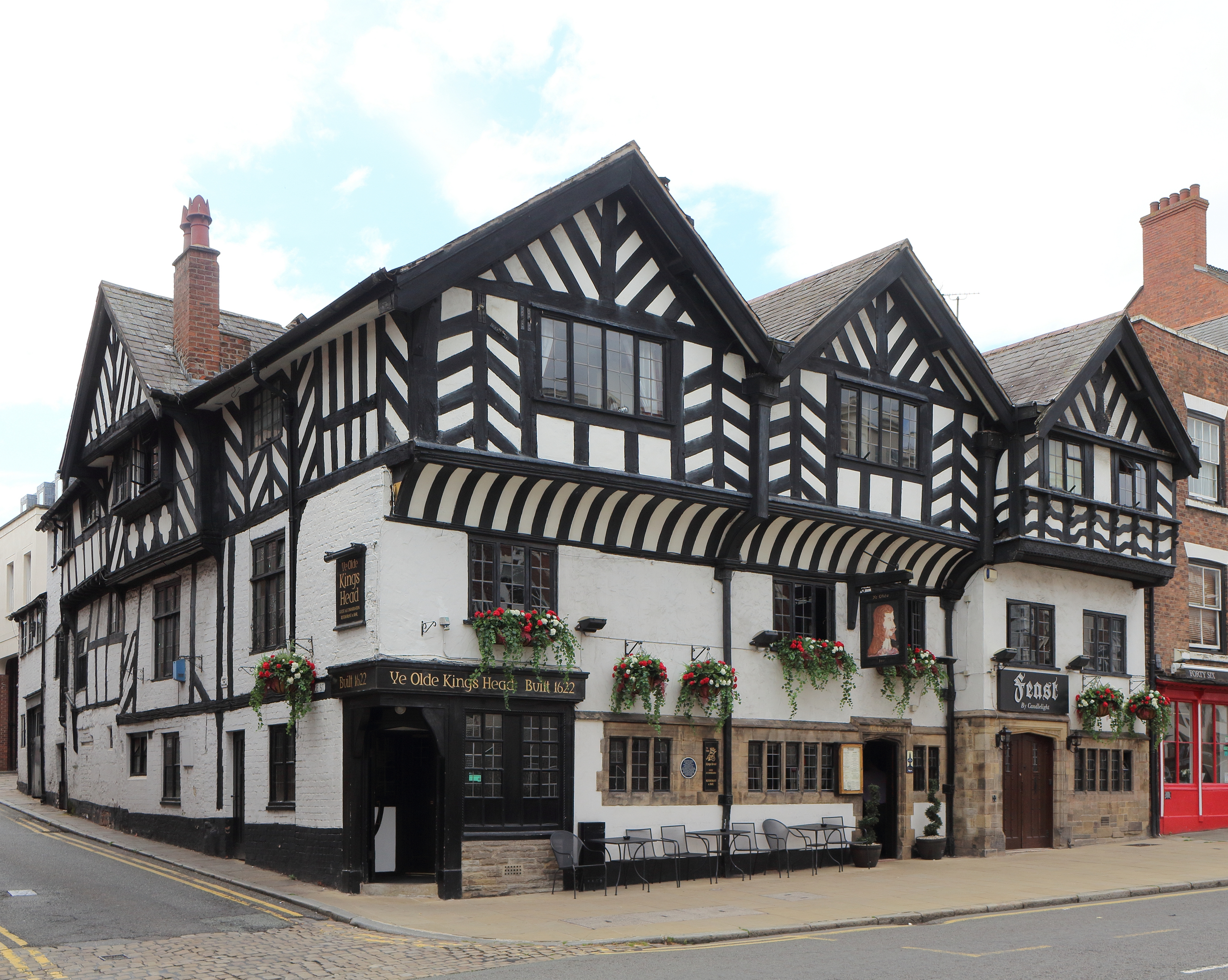
- Old King's Head Hotel, Chester

- Location in Cheshire
- 53.1874°N 2.8905°W
- Location: Lower Bridge Street, Chester, Cheshire, England
- OS grid reference: SJ 406 660

History
- Built: c. 1208
- Built for: Peter the Clerk

Listed Building – Grade II*
- Designated: 28 July 1955
- Reference no.: 1376307

The Old King's Head Hotel is a hotel and public house at 48–50 Lower Bridge Street, on the corner of Castle Street, Chester, Cheshire, England. It is recorded in the National Heritage List for England as a designated Grade II* listed building.

== History ==
The building was constructed in about 1208. It was the town house for Peter the Clerk, the administrator of Chester Castle. It initially contained a section of the Chester Rows, but these were enclosed during the alterations made between the 15th and early 17th centuries. The latest of these alterations were made for Randle Holme I. Inside the building on the middle floor you can still see evidence of the original Chester rows as the support pillars are still in place. The building was restored in 1935, and again during the 1960s.

== Architecture ==
It is basically a timber-framed building, part of which has been refaced with yellow sandstone, and with brick that has been painted or rendered. The roofs are slated. The building is in three storeys, of which the upper storey facing Lower Bridge Street is jettied. Both faces have three bays. The three bays on Lower Bridge Street are gabled, as is the middle bay on Castle Street.

== See also ==
- Grade II* listed buildings in Cheshire West and Chester
