= Old Bishop's Palace, Chester =

Old Bishop's Palace
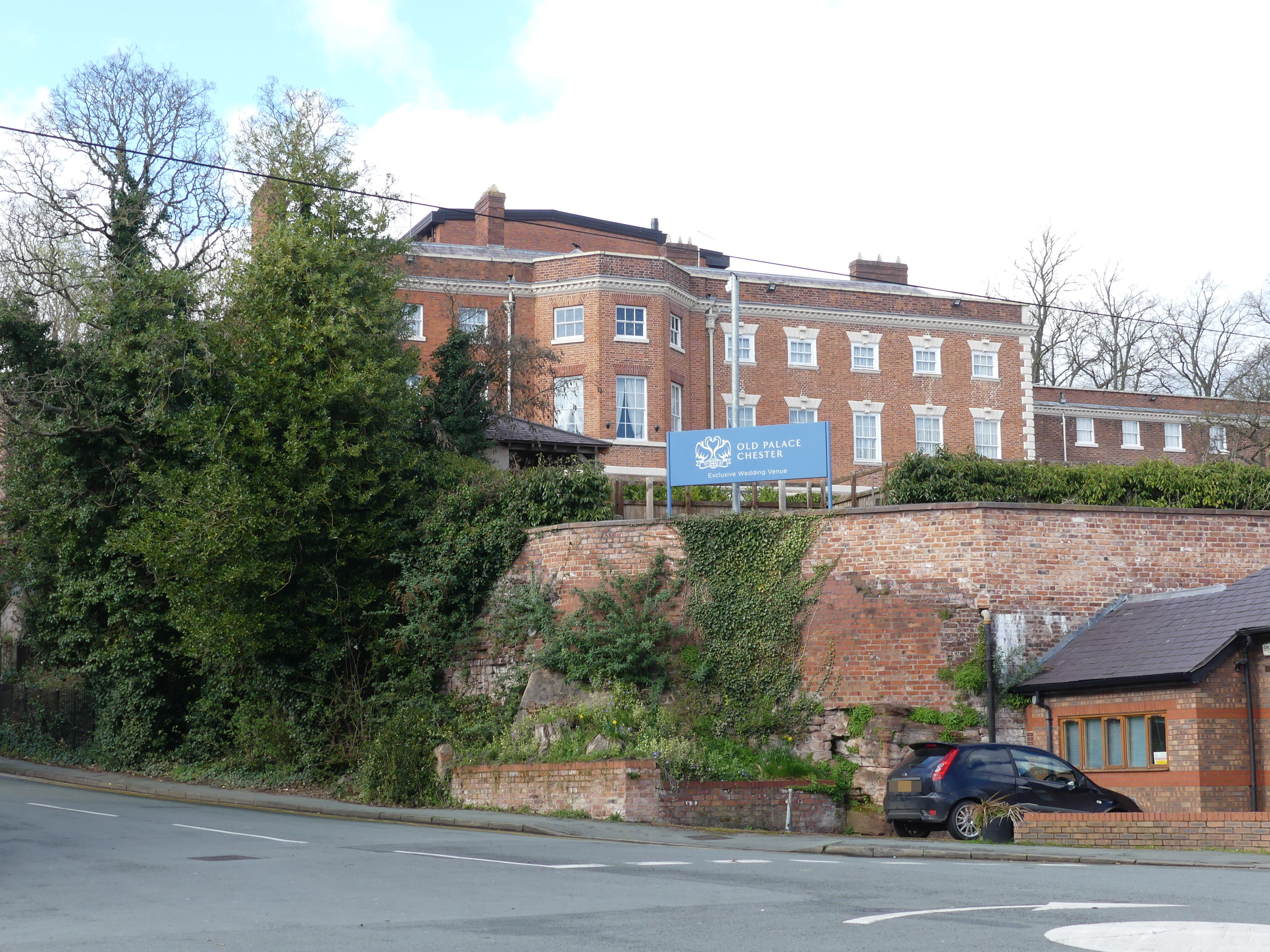

- Location in Cheshire
- 53.1884°N 2.8867°W
- Location: The Groves, Chester, Cheshire, England
- OS grid reference: SJ 409 661

History
- Built: 1745–51
- Built for: Bishop Samuel Peploe

Site notes
- Architectural style: Georgian

Listed Building – Grade II*
- Designated: 28 July 1955
- Reference no.: 1375949

Old Palace Chester is located in an elevated position overlooking The Groves and the River Dee in Chester, Cheshire, England. It is recorded in the National Heritage List for England as a designated Grade II* listed building.

== History ==
Building of the palace began before 1745, and it was completed in 1751. It was built for Samuel Peploe, Bishop of Chester. The palace was substantially expanded in the 18th century, and altered again in the 19th century but, apart from the main door, its external appearance has been virtually unchanged since the 18th century. It became the official residence of the bishops of Chester in 1865, and continued to be used for this purpose until the 1920s. It then was converted for use as a YMCA hostel, and retained this purpose until the early 1980s, when it was further converted into commercial offices.

== Architecture ==
The palace is constructed in red brick with stone dressings and has grey slate roofs. It is in three storeys plus cellars, and has a hipped roof. The front of the main block facing the river has eleven bays with rusticated quoins at the corners. The fourth to sixth bays form a canted projection rising through the three storeys containing the entrance door in the ground floor. All the other bays in each storey contain a sash window. Between the ground and first floors is a stone band. Above the upper storey is a stone cornice and a brick coped parapet. There is a one-bay wing at the right end of the building. In the wing and on the sides of the building are more sash windows. The interior contains an open-well staircase with six flights and turned balusters; the balustrade has replaced a former Chinese Chippendale balustrade. On the first floor is a large room with an 18th-century decorated ceiling.

== See also ==
- Grade II* listed buildings in Cheshire West and Chester
