= Pied Bull Hotel =

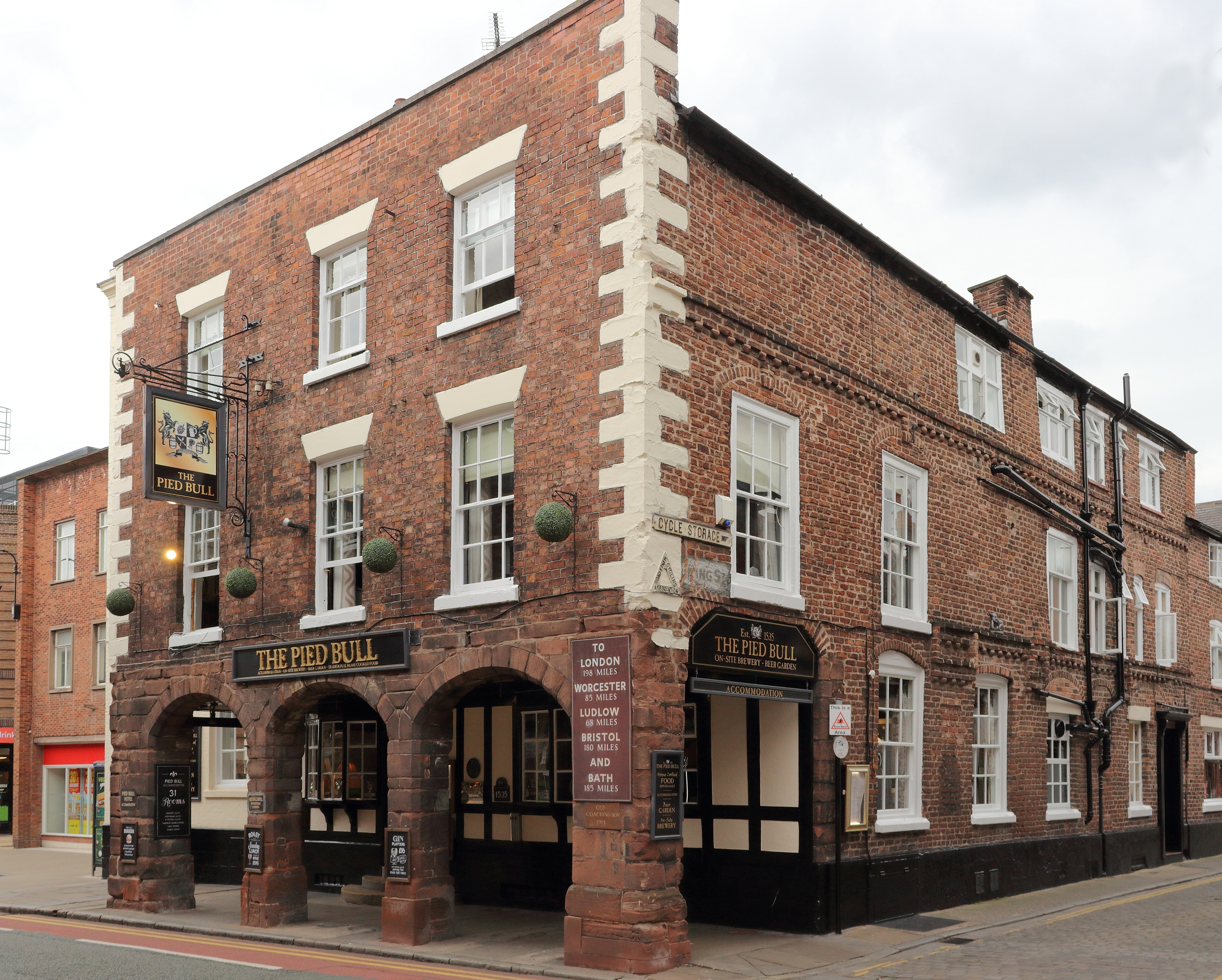
- Pied Bull Hotel

- Location in Cheshire
- 53.1931°N 2.8931°W
- Location: 57 Northgate Street, Chester, Cheshire, England
- OS grid reference: SJ 404 666

History
- Built: 17th century

Listed Building – Grade II*
- Designated: 28 July 1955
- Reference no.: 1376356

The Pied Bull Hotel is located at 57 Northgate Street, on the corner of King Street, Chester, Cheshire, England. It is recorded in the National Heritage List for England as a designated Grade II* listed building.

== History ==
The building dates from the 17th century, probably in the site of two medieval tenements. It was partly refronted in the later part of the 17th century, and extended to the rear in the 19th century. It is thought to be the Chester inn described by George Borrow in Wild Wales.

== Architecture ==
The hotel is constructed in brick, with some sandstone and timber framing, and has grey slate roofs. It is in three storeys with cellars. On the Northgate Street side of the building is a three-arched arcade, above which are two storeys in Flemish bond brick. The rear face to the arcade is timber framed and includes an entrance containing a 17th-century door, with a slightly bayed window on each side. On the corners of the building are sandstone quoins. In the upper two storeys are sash windows, and at the top is a plain stone coped parapet.

Most of the historical features have been removed from the interior. The features retained include a large sandstone fireplace in the front room, which dates probably from the early or mid-17th century, and the 17th-century carved oak staircase.

== See also ==
- Grade II* listed buildings in Cheshire West and Chester
