= Shipgate House =

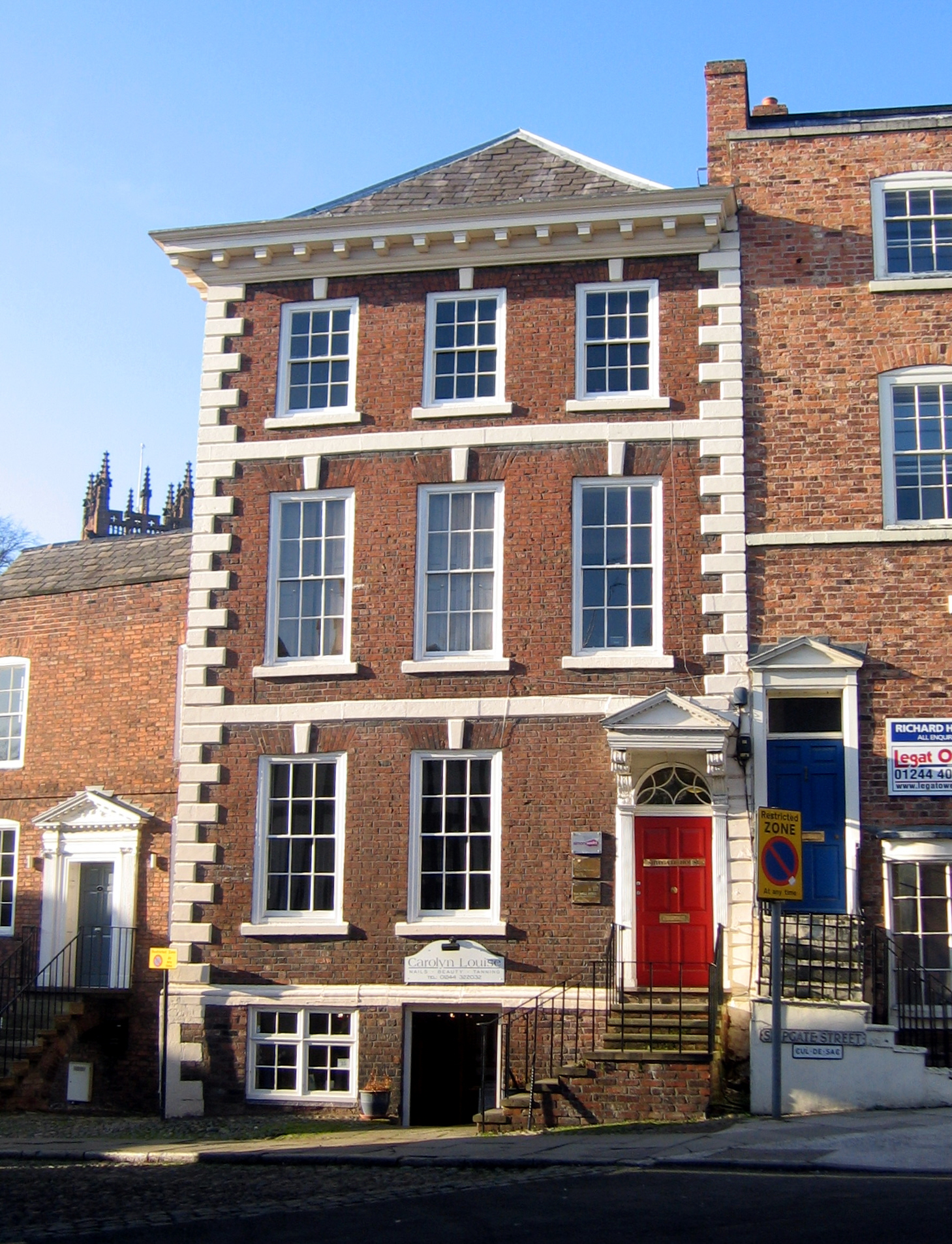
- Shipgate House

- Location in Cheshire
- 53.186557°N 2.890056°W
- Location: 2 Shipgate Street, Chester, Cheshire, England
- OS grid reference: SJ 406 658

History
- Built: 17th century
- Rebuilt: Mid-18th century

Site notes
- Architectural style: Georgian
- Restored: 1971–74
- Restored by: Chester City Council

Listed Building – Grade II*
- Designated: 28 July 1955
- Reference no.: 1376399

Shipgate House is at 2 Shipgate Street, Chester, Cheshire, England. It is recorded in the National Heritage List for England as a designated Grade II* listed building. The house takes its name because it stands near the site of the old Shipgate, which has been moved and rebuilt in Grosvenor Park.

== History ==
The earliest parts of the house date from the 17th century, but most of its remaining fabric is from a rebuilding in the middle of the 18th century. In 1963 the house and an adjoining cottage were bought by Cheshire County Council with a view to demolishing them and building an extension to County Hall. However this was successfully opposed by the Chester Civic Trust. The house was substantially restored between 1971 and 1974.

== Architecture ==
The basement is constructed in coursed sandstone, and probably dates from the 17th century. The rest of the house is in red-brown Flemish bond brick. The dressings are in stone, and the hipped roof is in grey slate. The building is in three storeys plus the basement, and has three bays. There are three steps leading down to an entrance doorway in the basement. Leading up to the entrance on the bottom storey is an L-shaped stairway of five and four steps. Over the door is a fanlight, and it has a fluted pilaster on each side. Above it is a pediment supported by modillion brackets. Each bay on every storey contains a sash window with a stone sill below and a keystone above. Between the storeys are stone bands. The projecting eaves are carried on a stone cornice beam. The interior is notable for its open-well oak staircase rising through all the floors; it has square newels, and two barleysugar balusters on each step. The house is listed at Grade II* because of its façade and its oak staircase.

== See also ==
- Grade II* listed buildings in Cheshire West and Chester
