= Anchorite's Cell, Chester =

Historic building in Chester, England

Anchorite's Cell The Hermitage
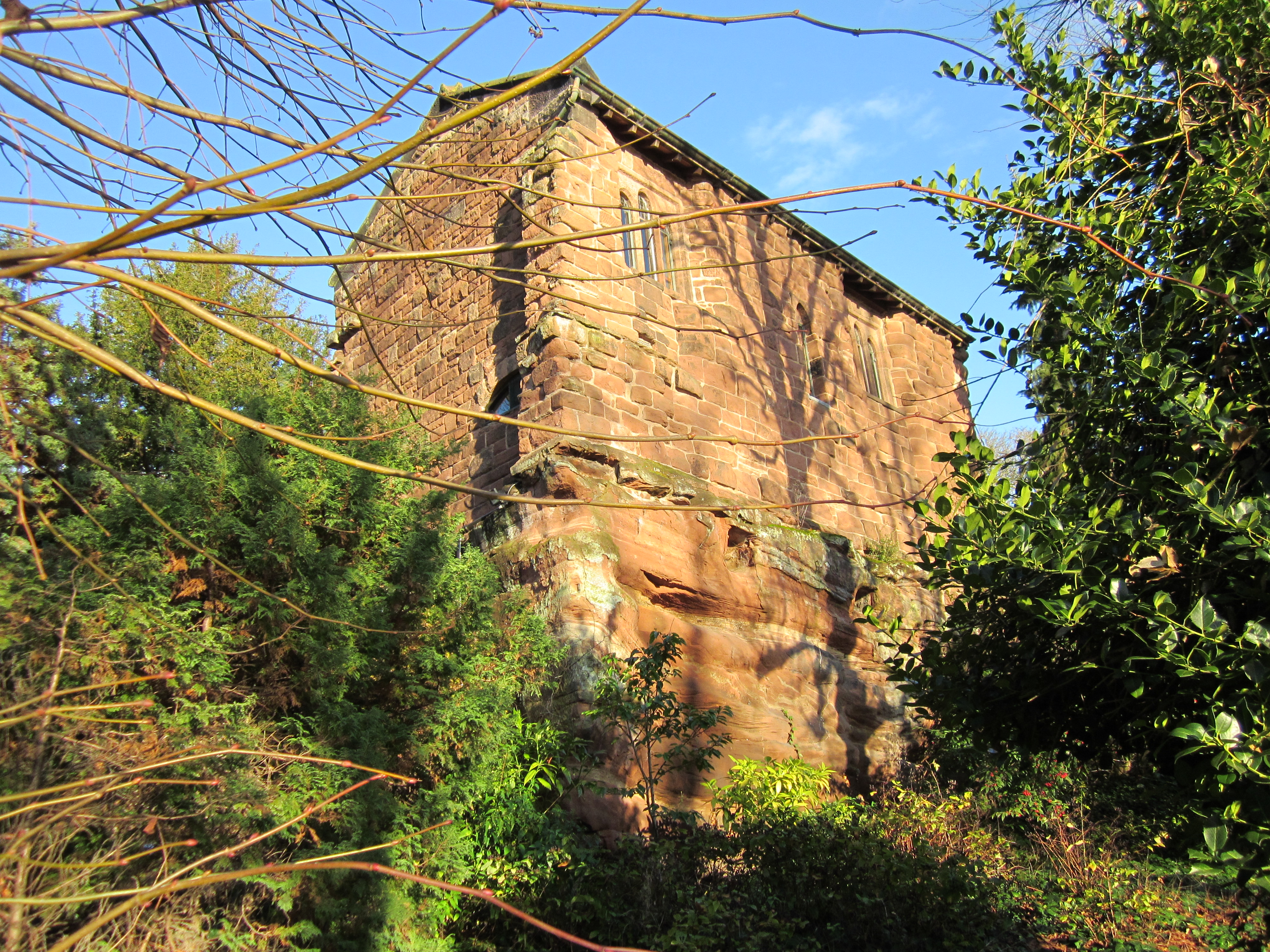
- The Anchorite's Cell, photographed in 2011

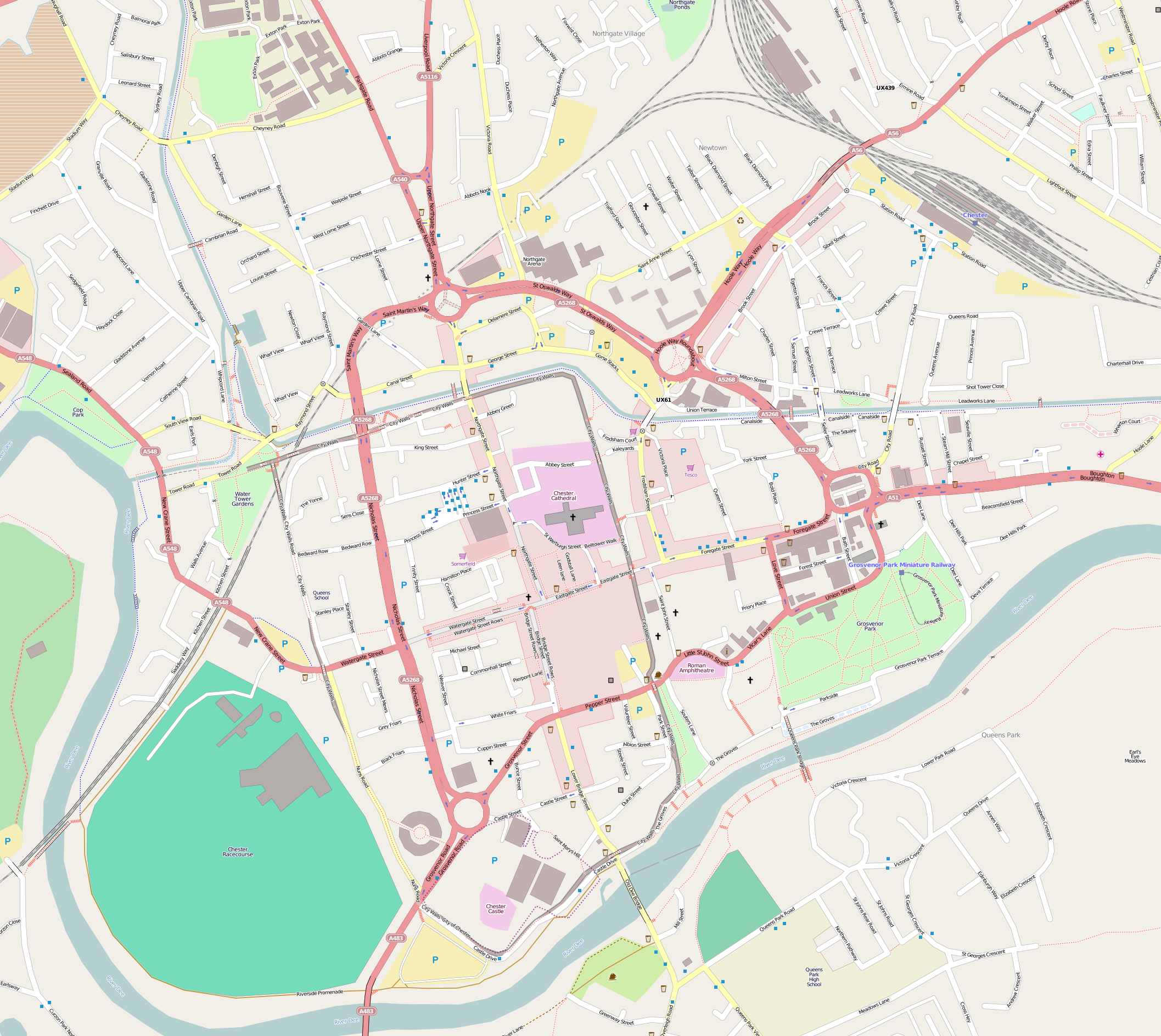
- Location within Chester city centre

General information
- Status: Completed
- Type: Religious retreat (original); house (since the 19th century)
- Location: The Groves; CH1 1SD, Chester, England
- Coordinates: 53.1884°N 2.8852°W
- Completed: 1363; 663 years ago
- Renovated: 19th century; 1897; c. 1970

Technical details
- Material: Sandstone and slate

Listed Building – Grade II*
- Official name: The Hermitage
- Designated: 28 July 1955
- Reference no.: 1375947

The Anchorite's Cell (or Hermitage) is a small building overlooking The Groves, Chester, Cheshire, England (grid reference SJ409660). It is recorded in the National Heritage List for England as a designated Grade II* listed building.

== History ==
The structure was built in 1363 as a religious retreat for a monk or a hermit. It belonged to the nearby St John the Baptist's Church until the Reformation. During the 19th century the building was restored and converted into a house. In 1897 the porch of St Martin's Church, which was being demolished, was moved here and made into a north entrance. The building was refurbished in about 1970 as a cottage.

== Architecture ==
The building, which stands on a plinth formed from a sandstone outcrop, is constructed in coursed sandstone ashlar and has a grey slate roof. It is in two storeys with the entrance on the north side. The porch has a segmental arch flanked by colonettes with trefoils in the spandrels, and a triple lancet window on the right side. To the right of the porch is a two-light mullioned casement window, and a projecting stone chimney. In the upper storey, above the porch, is a panel containing a triple lancet window. To the right of this is another lancet window and the voussoirs of a blocked arch. In the east end of the building is a segmental-arched window in the ground floor, a three-light mullioned window with intersecting tracery in the upper floor, and a coped gable. At the west end is a high-level segmental-arched window in the ground floor, a buttress at the southwest corner, and a coped gable with a gabled finial. There are more lancet windows in the south side.

== See also ==
- Grade II* listed buildings in Cheshire West and Chester
