= 33 Eastgate Street, Chester =

Coordinates: 53.1908°N 2.8899°W

33 Eastgate Street
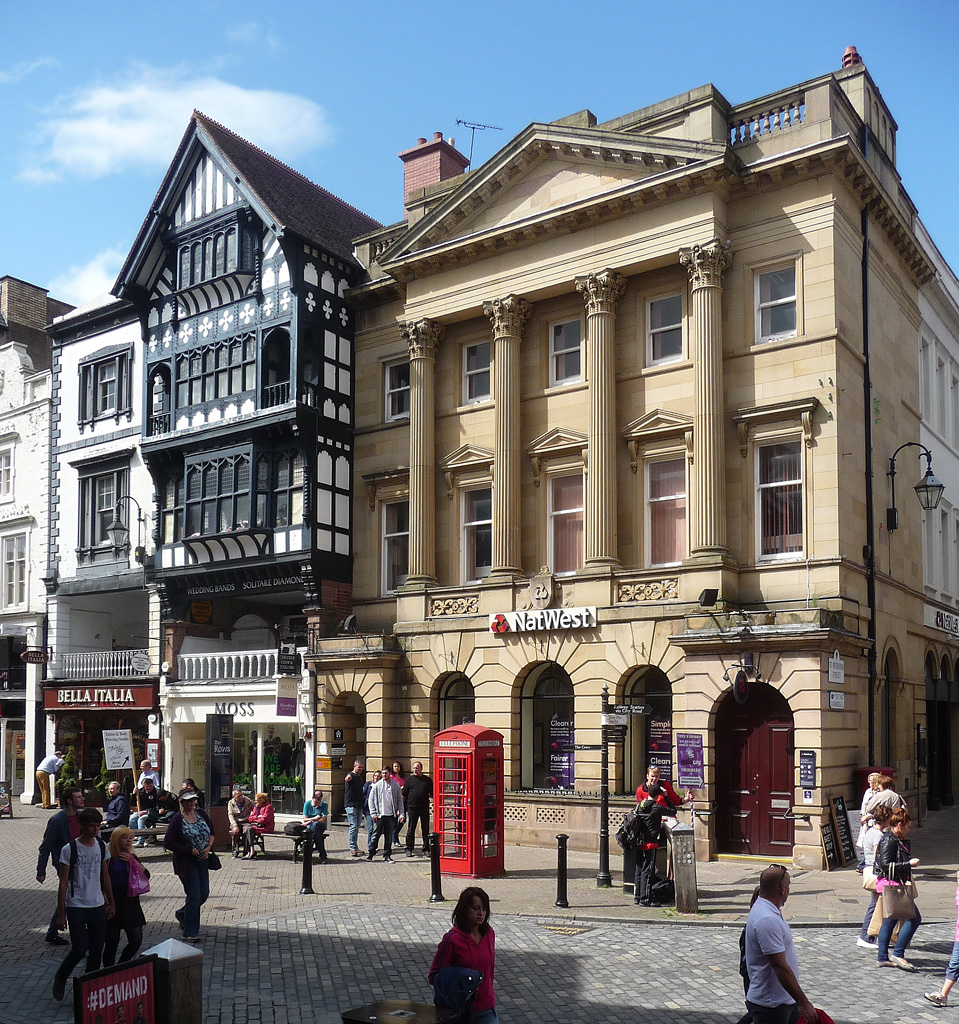
- Interactive map of the 33 Eastgate Street area

General information
- Status: Grade II* listed
- Type: Bank
- Architectural style: Neoclassical
- Location: Corner of Eastgate Street and St Werburgh Street, Chester, England
- Completed: 1859–60

Technical details
- Floor count: 3

33 Eastgate Street, Chester, at the corner of Eastgate Street and St Werburgh Street, Chester, England, was built in 1859–60 for the Chester Bank and, as of 2012, it continues in use as the NatWest Bank. It is recorded in the National Heritage List for England as a designated Grade II* listed building. It is in Neoclassical style, but was built at the time that the Black-and-white Revival was underway in the city, and was therefore the subject of much criticism for being "out of place". It consists of three storeys, with five bays on the Eastgate Street side, and three bays facing St Werburgh Street. The ground floor is rusticated with tall round-arched openings. On the side facing Eastgate Street the middle three bays of the upper storeys are occupied by a blank portico with four Corinthian columns supporting a pediment with modillion cornices. All the windows are sashes. The banking hall has a panelled ceiling carried on four Ionic columns.

== See also ==
- Grade II* listed buildings in Cheshire
