= Chester Town Hall =

Municipal building in Chester, Cheshire, England

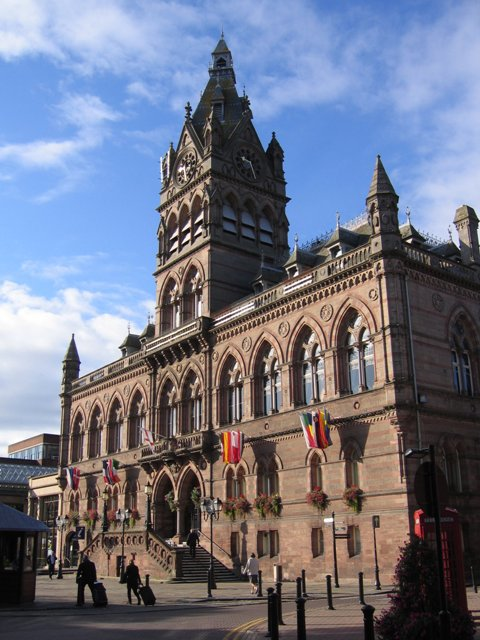

- Location in Cheshire
- 53.1918°N 2.8927°W
- Location: Chester, Cheshire, England
- OS grid reference: SJ 404 664

History
- Built: 1864–69
- Built for: Chester City Council

Site notes
- Architect: William H. Lynn
- Architectural style: Gothic Revival
- Restored: 1898
- Restored by: T. M. Lockwood
- Governing body: Cheshire West and Chester

Listed Building – Grade II*
- Designated: 10 January 1972
- Reference no.: 1376371

Chester Town Hall is in Northgate Street in the centre of the city of Chester, Cheshire, England. It is recorded in the National Heritage List for England as a designated Grade II* listed building.

== History ==
In 1698 an exchange was built to accommodate the city's administrators. This building burnt down in 1862. A competition was held to build a new town hall and this was won by William Henry Lynn of Belfast. The building cost £40,000 (equivalent to £4,120,000 in 2025). It was officially opened on 15 October 1869 by the Prince of Wales (the future Edward VII) who was accompanied by W. E. Gladstone, the Prime Minister. On 27 March 1897 the council chamber on the second floor was gutted by fire. It was restored by T. M. Lockwood the following year. In 1979 a clock was installed in the tower with three faces; there is no face on the west side of the tower. Queen Elizabeth II, accompanied by the Duchess of Sussex, attended lunch at the town hall during their visit to Cheshire on 14 June 2018.

== Architecture ==
=== Exterior ===
The hall is built in banded pink and buff sandstone with a grey-green slate roof. The building is nearly symmetrical, in ten bays, and in the Gothic Revival style, applying features of late 13th-century Gothic architecture to a modern use. Above the central two bays is a tower which terminates with gables and a short diagonal spire. The spire rises to a height of 160 feet (49 m). The building has a semi-basement, two main storeys and a dormer attic. The entrance is approached by two opposed flights of steps. Above the porch are four sculptures in Bath stone depicting episodes from the history of the city.

=== Interior ===
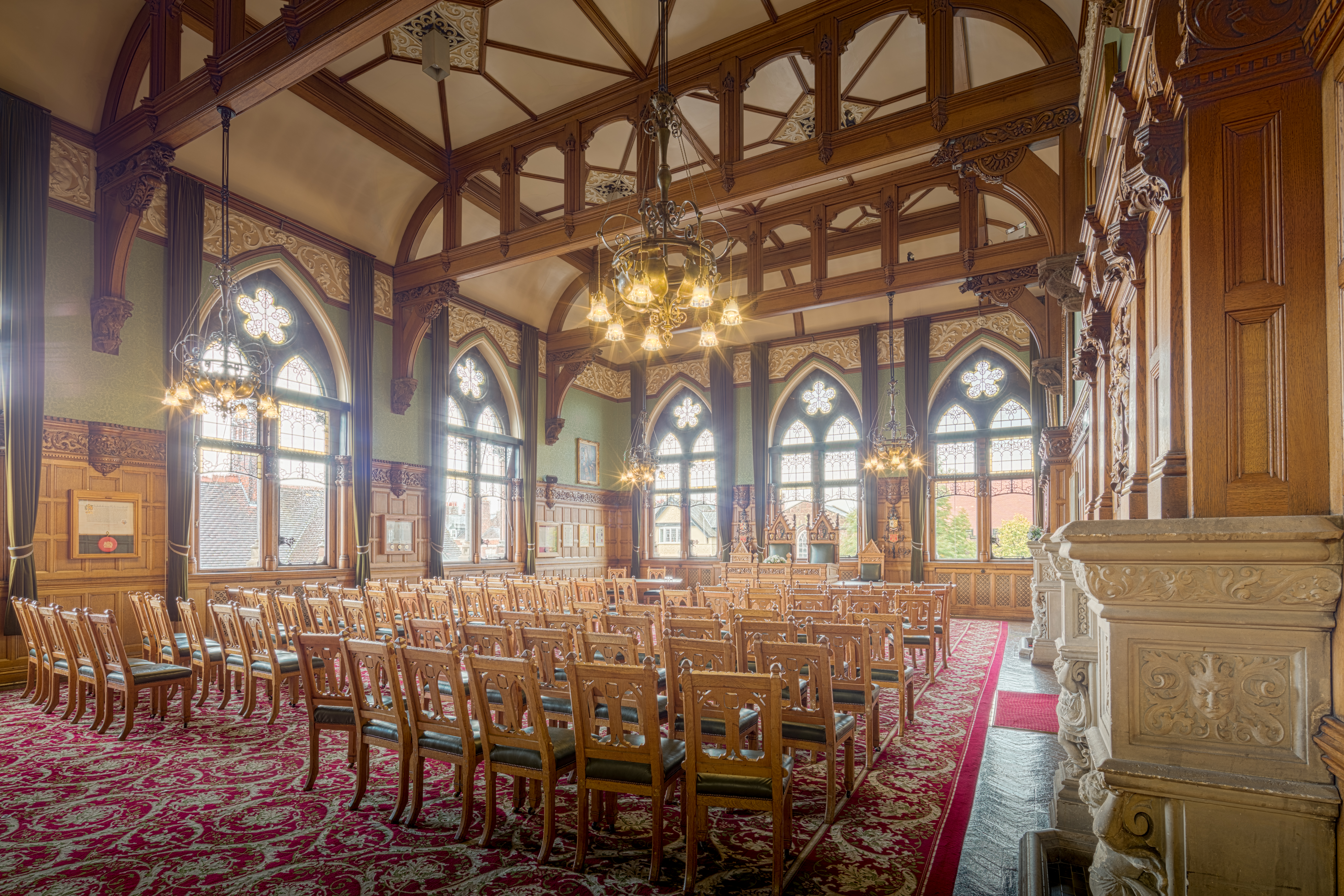
Council Chambers

The entrance leads to the Waiting Hall. Also on this floor are the Palatine Room, the Assembly Room and the Court Room. Flanking the doors of the Waiting Hall are busts of George V and Sir Horatio Lloyd, who was Recorder of Chester from 1866 to 1921. Also in the hall are three sculptures which depict minstrels marching to the aid of Earl Ranulph III who was besieged in Rhuddlan Castle, Sir William Brereton following his arrest in 1642, Edward, the Black Prince granting a charter to the city in 1354 and Henry VII granting county status to Chester in 1506. Outside the Assembly Room is a war memorial to the 768 citizens of Chester who died as a result of the First World War and a plaque to the memory of those who died in the Second World War. The Assembly Room is the largest room in the Town Hall and has a stage at one end. On the staircase are shields and plaques presented by visitors to the Town Hall. Above the staircase are Victorian stained glass windows depicting the seven Norman Earls of Chester.

On the first floor are the council chamber, the Lord Mayoral suite, a committee room and the members' room. The council chamber was rebuilt after the fire of 1897. It is panelled and contains wooden and stone carvings. The Lord Mayoral suite consists of the Lord Mayor's Parlour and the Mayoress' Parlour. In the committee room are panels bearing the names of the mayors of Chester from 1238, the sheriffs from 1836, the earls from around 1070, the clerks and town clerks from 1291 and the recorders from 1506.

== Present use ==
The Town Hall stands as a symbolic expression of the civil government of the city. Many of the rooms in the Town Hall are available for hire, and the hall is licensed for weddings.

== See also ==
- Grade II* listed buildings in Cheshire West and Chester
