= 43 Bridge Street, Chester =

- St Michael's Rectory
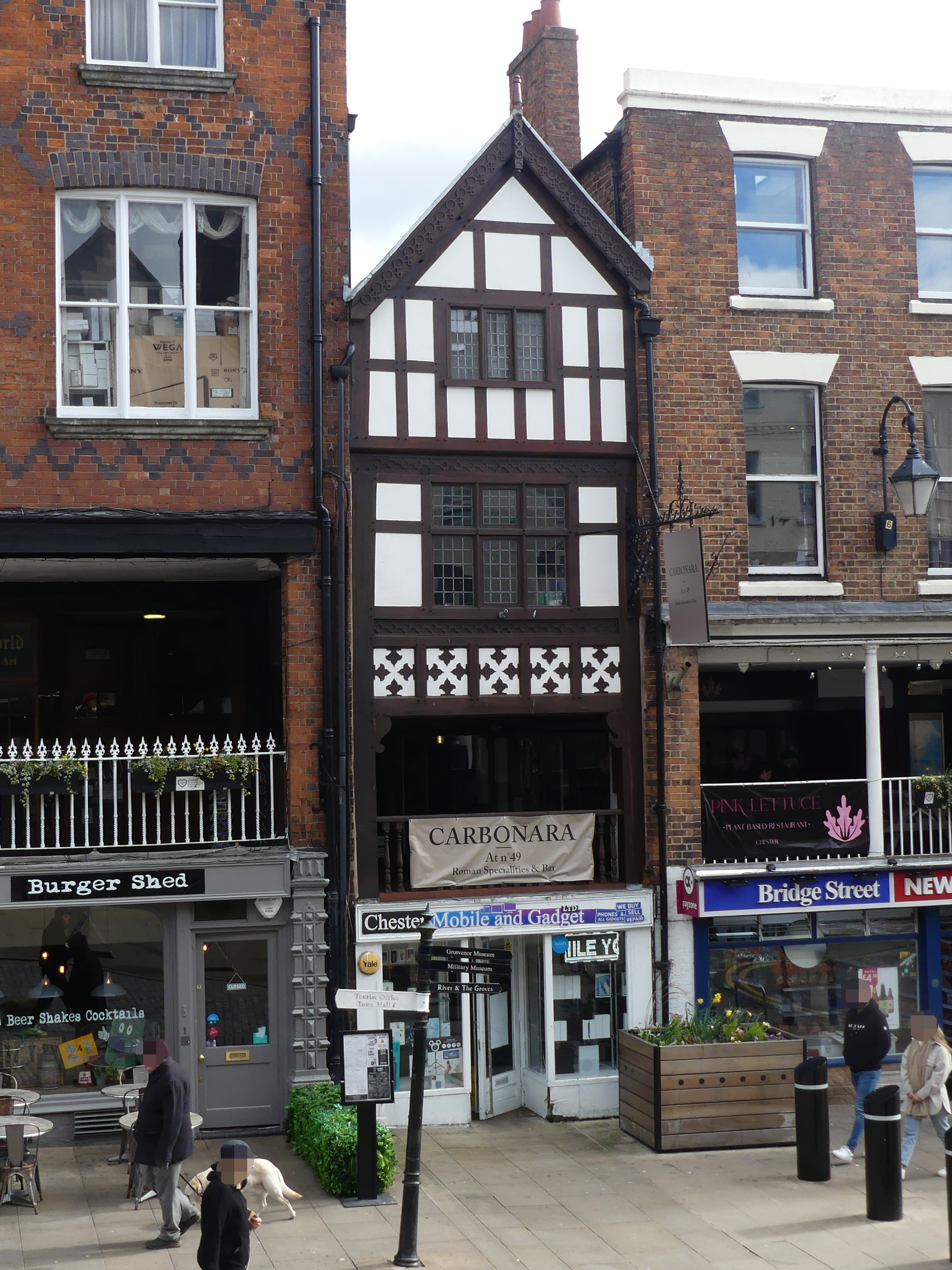
- From the Row opposite

- Location in Cheshire
- 53.1890°N 2.891°W
- Location: Chester, Cheshire, England
- OS grid reference: SJ 406 662

History
- Built: 17th century

Listed Building – Grade II*
- Official name: Number 43 Street; Number 49 Row
- Designated: 28 July 1955
- Reference no.: 1376089

43 Bridge Street is an undercroft and shop in Chester, Cheshire, England. It is recorded in the National Heritage List for England as a designated Grade II* listed building. It is also known as St Michael's Rectory.

== History ==
The building was originally a town house, but in 1659, soon after it was built, it was bequeathed to the parish of St Michael for use as a rectory. It ceased to be used as a rectory in 1907, and was converted into a shop by an antique dealer named Crawford. It was restored in the late 20th century.

== Architecture ==
Constructed in timber framing with plaster panels, the shop has a grey slate roof. It has four storeys, and consists of a single, narrow bay. A portion of the Chester Rows passes through the first floor. At street level is a modern shop front, behind which is the former undercroft. At the front of the first floor is a rail on balusters, behind which is a stallboard, the paved walkway of the Row, and a modern shop front. Above this is a row of five ornately shaped panels. The second floor contains a three-light mullioned and transomed casement window, with two panels on each side. The top storey is jettied and gabled. It contains a row of six plain panels, above which is a small three-light casement window with two panels on each side, and a queen post gable with patterned bargeboards and a finial. The interior has retained part of a 17th-century moulded ceiling, the form of the galleried former great hall, and an 18th-century staircase. In also contains four panels depicting the Stations of the Cross. These appear to be medieval, but are in fact plaster panels painted to resemble wood that were installed by Crawford when the rectory was converted into a shop.

== Current use ==
As of 2023 the street-level unit was occupied by a mobile phone repair shop and the property above on the Row (No. 49) housed an Italian restaurant.

== See also ==
- Grade II* listed buildings in Cheshire
