= Hockenhull Hall =

Mansion house in Cheshire, England

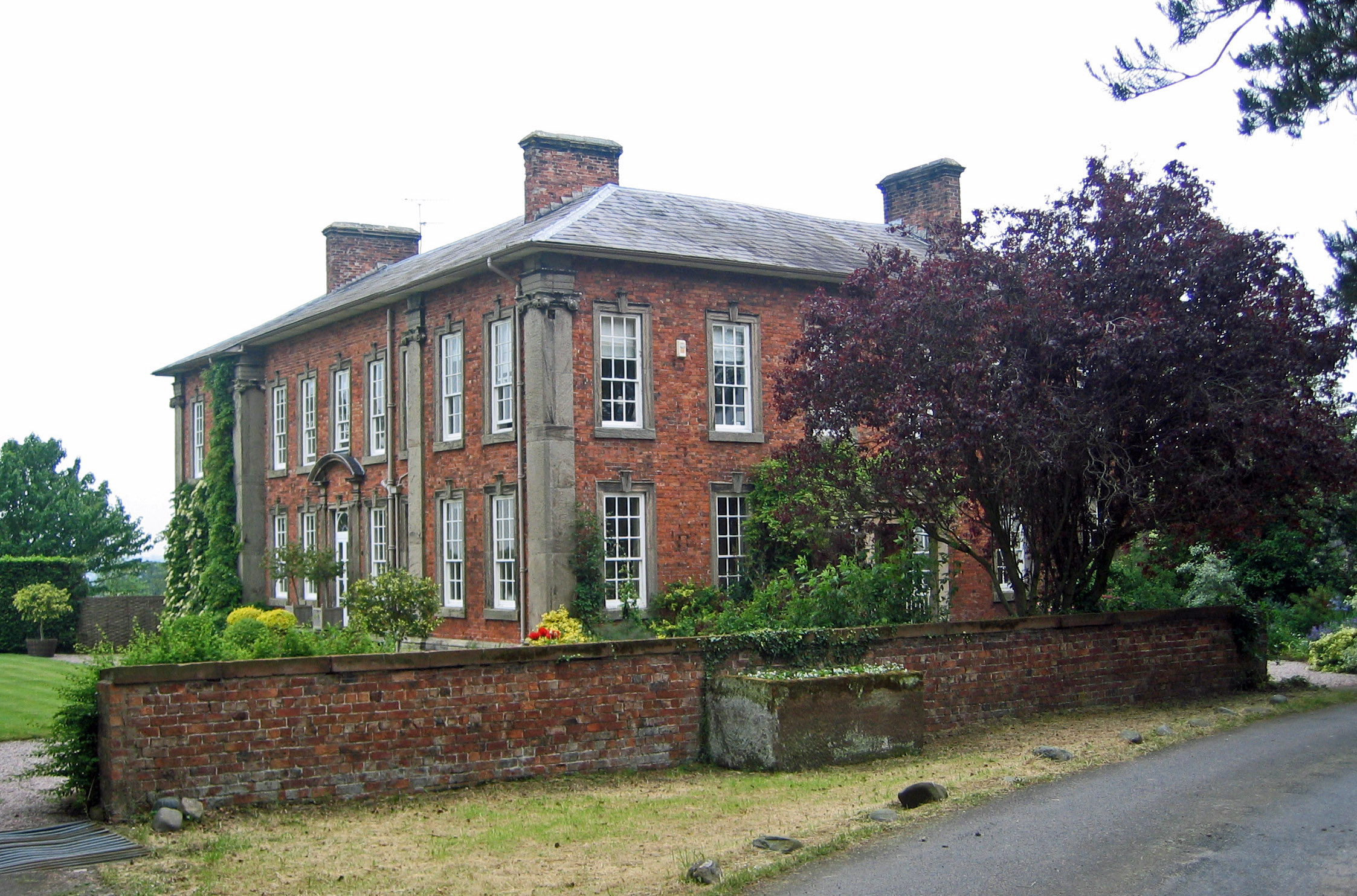
- Hockenhull Hall from the southeast

- Location within Cheshire
- 53.1896°N 2.7738°W
- Location: Tarvin, Cheshire, England
- OS grid reference: SJ 483 661

History
- Built: c. 1715
- Built for: Hugh Wishaw

Site notes
- Elevation: 128 feet (39 m)
- Architect: Francis Smith (attrib.)
- Architectural style: Georgian

Listed Building – Grade II*
- Designated: 22 October 1952
- Reference no.: 1130525

Hockenhull Hall is a mansion house to the southwest of the village of Tarvin, Cheshire, England. It is recorded in the National Heritage List for England as a designated Grade II* listed building. Hockenhull Hall dates from the 17th century but was completely remodelled about 1715 for Hugh Wishaw of Chester. Its design is attributed to the architect Francis Smith. It is built in brick with sandstone dressings and has a square plan. The roof is in Welsh slate and is hipped. The hall is built in two storeys over a basement, with the main façades facing the south and the east.

The hall is part of a working farm. In 2009 it was placed on the market with an estimated price of £4 million.

== See also ==
- Grade II* listed buildings in Cheshire West and Chester
