= List of works by James Harrison =

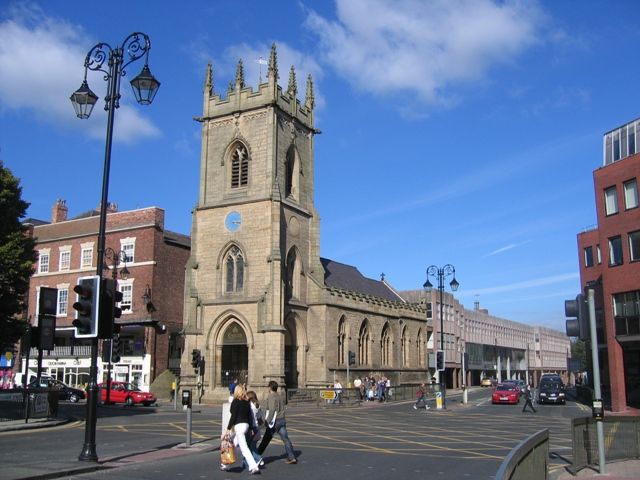
St Michael's Church, Chester

James Harrison (1814–66) was an English architect who worked mainly in Chester, Cheshire. He worked mainly on churches — building new churches, rebuilding old churches, and making amendments and alterations to existing churches. Harrison also designed a number of houses in the Queen's Park area of Chester, and farm buildings on the Bolesworth estate.

Harrison and Thomas Mainwaring Penson were the first architects to introduce buildings of the Black-and-white Revival to Chester in the 1850s. His rebuilding of God's Providence House in Watergate Street is described as "the first conservation case in the modern sense".

== Key ==
Grade	Criteria
I	Buildings of exceptional interest, sometimes considered to be internationally important
II*	Particularly important buildings of more than special interest
II	Buildings of national importance and special interest

== Works ==
Name	Location	Photograph	Date	Notes	Grade
St Margaret's Church	Whalley Range, Greater Manchester; 53.4554°N 2.2603°W		1848–49	A new church costing £6,000 (equivalent to £660,000 in 2025), paid for by Samuel Brooks, a banker who was developing the area.	II
St Michael's Church	Chester, Cheshire; 53.1887°N 2.8907°W		1849–50	Largely rebuilt, but retaining interior fabric from the older church. It closed as a church in 1972–73, and was converted into a heritage centre.	II
Trustee Savings Bank	Chester, Cheshire; 53.1871°N 2.8926°W		1851–53	Designed in Tudor Gothic style. An extension was added in the 1970s and the building was converted into a restaurant.	II*
Holy Ascension Church	Upton, Chester, Cheshire; 53.2157°N 2.8879°W		1853–54	Built in 14th-century style. Transepts were added in 1958 and 1967.	II
All Saints Church	Handley, Cheshire; 53.1154°N 2.7989°W		1853–55	The nave was rebuilt in Decorated style, re-using the roof of 1661. The chancel and vestry were added in 1891.	II*
St Nicholas' Chapel	Chester, Cheshire; 53.1913°N 2.8909°W		1854–55	Harrison converted the former medieval chapel into concert hall. It was later changed to be used as a shop. The site is a Scheduled monument.	II
Christ Church	Hough Green, Chester, Cheshire; 53.1796°N 2.9147°W		1855	New church.	II
St Deiniol's Church	Hawarden, Flintshire, Wales; 53.1859°N 3.0258°W		1855–56	Restored by Harrison, but badly damaged by fire in 1857.	II*
Holy Trinity Church	Capenhurst, Cheshire; 53.2573°N 2.9489°W		1856–59	New church. The tower was added in 1889–90 by John Douglas.	II
St Matthew's School	Buckley, Flintshire		1857	Since converted into a private house.	
St Andrew's Church	Newgate Street, Chester, Cheshire		1857–60	(With J. and J. M. Hay) A Presbyterian church, since closed.	
40 Bridge Street	Chester, Cheshire; 53.1892°N 2.8915°W		1858	Substantially rebuilt in Gothic Revival style.	II
51–53 Bridge Street	Chester, Cheshire; 53.1890°N 2.8910°W		1858	An early example of Black-and-white Revival (vernacular) architecture in Chester.	II
Haybarn	Tattenhall Hall, Tattenhall, Cheshire; 53.1179°N 2.7685°W		1858	It is the best and the least-altered building on the model farm belonging to the hall. Built for Robert Barbour.	II
Gate piers and wing walls	Tattenhall Hall, Tattenhall, Cheshire; 53.1186°N 2.7719°W		1858 (?)	Built for Robert Barbour.	II
St Olave's Church	Chester, Cheshire; 53.1873°N 2.8899°W		1859	A simple church dating from the 11th century, restored by Harrison.	II
St Luke's Church	Dunham on the Hill, Cheshire; 53.2520°N 2.7924°W		1860–61	A new church in early 14th-century style.	II
Church of St Mary-on-the Hill	Chester, Cheshire; 53.1863°N 2.8911°W		1861–62	Renewal of the exterior stonework and rebuilding of the top of the tower. Harrison also designed a memorial in the church to William Currie, who died in 1834.	I
God's Providence House	Chester, Cheshire; 53.1901°N 2.8926°W		1862	Virtual replacement of a house dating from 1652, using some of the original carved timber.	II
Holy Trinity Church	Chester, Cheshire; 53.1899°N 2.8946°W		1865–69	A new church replacing an older church on the site. Harrison died before it was completed. It is now the Guildhall.	II
Drill Hall	Chester, Cheshire; 53.1879°N 2.8887°W		1868	Converted into flats during the 20th century.	II
