= Listed buildings in Golborne Bellow =

Golborne Bellow is a former civil parish, now in the parish of Tattenhall and District, in Cheshire West and Chester, England. It contains three buildings that are recorded in the National Heritage List for England as designated listed buildings, all of which are at Grade II. This grade is the lowest of the three gradings given to listed buildings and is applied to "buildings of national importance and special interest". Other than part of the village of Gatesheath, the parish is entirely rural. The listed buildings consist of two farmhouses, and a set of farm buildings.

Name and location	Photograph	Date	Notes
Gatesheath Hall; 53.1345°N 2.7852°W	—	Late 17th century	A farmhouse whose main fabric dates from the mid-18th century with additions the following century. It is constructed in brick with stone dressings and a slate roof. The farmhouse has a double-pile plan, and a symmetrical three-storey, three-bay front. In the central bay is a stone porch with a wooden doorcase flanked by fluted pilasters. The windows are casements. There is a three-bay extension to the right, and a dovecote has been incorporated in the rear as a bathroom.
Russia Hall; 53.1243°N 2.7861°W	—	Late 18th century	Alterations and additions were made in the middle of the 19th century. It is a brick farmhouse with a slate roof, and has a long rectangular plan. The farmhouse has three storeys and a five-bay front. There are two doorways, one of which is blocked. The windows are sashes with stone heads and cills.
Farm buildings, Gatesheath Hall; 53.1347°N 2.7848°W	—	Early 19th century	The farm buildings are in brick with a slate roof and stone-coped gables. They have an L-shaped plan. Features include circular pitch holes, diamond-shaped ventilation holes, and an external stairway.

== See also ==
- Listed buildings in Beeston
- Listed buildings in Broxton
- Listed buildings in Burwardsley
- Listed buildings in Chowley
- Listed buildings in Golborne David
- Listed buildings in Handley
- Listed buildings in Hargrave
- Listed buildings in Huxley
- Listed buildings in Tattenhall
