= Hatton, Cheshire West and Chester =

Former civil parish in Cheshire, England

Coordinates: 53.138°N 2.798°W

Hatton
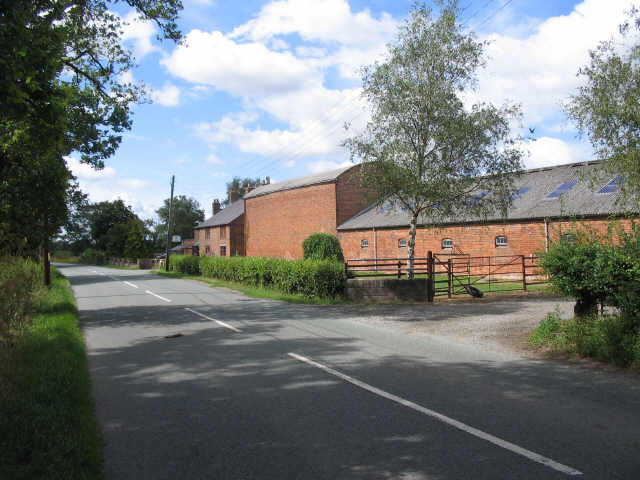
- Grange Farm

- Location within Cheshire
- Population: 198 (2011 census) (Note: The ONS 2011 population figure includes the civil parishes of Golborne Bellow and Hatton)
- OS grid reference: SJ467604
- Civil parish: Hargrave and Huxley/ Golborne David/ Tattenhall and District
- Unitary authority: Cheshire West and Chester
- Ceremonial county: Cheshire
- Region: North West
- Country: England
- Sovereign state: United Kingdom
- Post town: CHESTER
- Postcode district: CH3
- Dialling code: 01829
- Police: Cheshire
- Fire: Cheshire
- Ambulance: North West
- UK Parliament: Chester South and Eddisbury

Hatton is a former civil parish, now in the parishes of Hargrave and Huxley, Golborne David and Tattenhall and District, in the unitary authority of Cheshire West and Chester and ceremonial county of Cheshire, England. The parish included most of the village of Hatton Heath, which is approximately 6 miles (9.7 km) south east of Chester and 4 miles (6.4 km) north-west of Tattenhall.

In the 2001 census it had a population of 120, The population in the 2011 census was 198, which included the parish of Golborne Bellow.

== History ==
The name Hatton means "heath farm/settlement" and likely derives from the Old English words hǣð (heather, a tract of uncultivated land) and tūn (a farmstead or settlement).

Hatton was mentioned in the Domesday Book of 1086 as Etune, under the ownership of Ilbert of Roullours. The entry lists only one household (a villager), making it amongst the smallest 20% of settlements recorded in the survey.

It was in Broxton Hundred. Hatton was formerly a township in the parish of Waverton, in 1866 Hatton became a separate civil parish. The population was recorded at 152 in 1801, then 164 in 1851, 134 in 1901 and decreasing to 126 by 1951. On 1 April 2015 the parish was abolished to form "Hargrave and Huxley" and "Tattenhall and District", part also went to Golborne David.

== Landmarks ==
Hatton Hall moated site is an ancient monument and dates to c.1200. The moat surrounds an island of approximately 60m x 55m upon which stood the hall, a quadrangular structure of timber. The hall was replaced by the present farm house c.1830 and a sandstone revetted causeway was constructed in the early 19th century. These are both Grade II listed buildings.
