= St Olave's Church, Chester =

Coordinates: 53.1873°N 2.8899°W

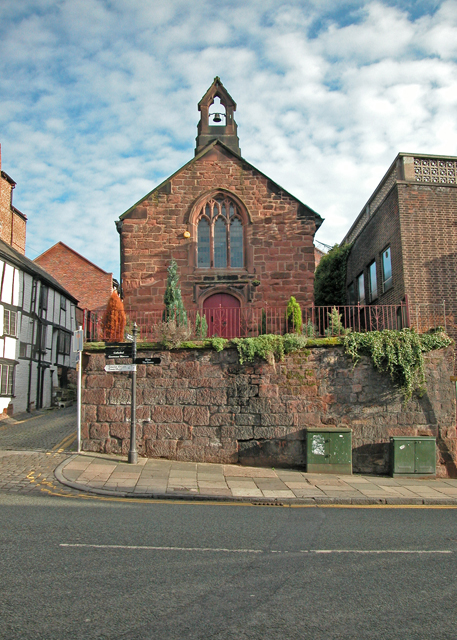
- St Olave's Church, Chester, seen from the west

- Location in Cheshire
- OS grid reference: SJ 406 660
- Location: Lower Bridge Street, Chester, Cheshire
- Country: England
- Denomination: Anglican

History
- Status: Parish church
- Dedication: Saint Olave

Architecture
- Functional status: Redundant
- Heritage designation: Grade II
- Designated: 28 July 1955
- Architects: James Harrison (restoration)
- Architectural type: Church
- Style: Gothic

Specifications
- Materials: Sandstone, slate roofs

St Olave's Church is a redundant Anglican parish church located in Lower Bridge Street, Chester, Cheshire, England. The church is recorded in the National Heritage List for England as a designated Grade II listed building.

== History ==
The church was founded in the 11th century. Its dedication is to the 11th-century patron saint of Norway, St Olaf. At the time that the church was founded, the area around Lower Bridge Street was largely occupied by Scandinavians, and it is thought that this is the reason for the dedication.

The present church building dates from 1611. In 1841 the parish of St Olave's was united with that of St Michael's, and the church closed. The building was restored in 1849 by James Harrison and converted into use as a school. It was declared redundant by the Church of England on 3 October 1972. It has since been used as the Chester Revival Centre, a Pentecostal church, and as an exhibition centre.

== Architecture ==
Constructed in red sandstone with grey slate roofs, the church has a simple rectangular plan. On the west front is the entrance door, above which is a three-light window, and a bellcote on the gable. Along the sides of the church are rectangular windows. The interior is also simple, with plastered walls that lean outward. Ten steps lead up to the west entrance from St Olave's Street to the north of the church. In front of the church is a wall that originally supported a building in front of the church. The wall and its wrought iron railings are included in the listing.

== See also ==
- Grade II listed buildings in Chester (central)
