= Listed buildings in Handley, Cheshire =

Handley is a civil parish in Cheshire West and Chester, England. It contains seven buildings that are recorded in the National Heritage List for England as designated listed buildings. Two of these are listed at Grade II*, the middle grade, and the rest are at the lowest grade, Grade II. The parish contains the villages of Handley and Milton Green, and is otherwise entirely rural. The listed buildings are all domestic, apart from a church.

== Key ==
Grade	Criteria
II*	Particularly important buildings of more than special interest
II	Buildings of national importance and special interest

== Buildings ==
Name and location	Photograph	Date	Notes	Grade
All Saints Church; 53.1154°N 2.7989°W		1512	The tower is the oldest part of the church. The rest of the church was restored in 1854 by James Harrison who replaced all the masonry, but re-used the hammerbeam roof dated 1661. A chancel and vestry were added in 1891. The church is built in red sandstone with a slate roof, and has a three-bay nave. The tower is embattled, and has gargoyles.	II*
Handley Oak; 53.11450°N 2.79764°W		Late 16th century	A cross-wing was added in 1601. Originally a farmhouse, it was converted into three cottages, then into a house. It is timber-framed on a stone plinth, and has a wood shingle roof. The house has two storeys and a three-bay front. The left bay is gabled, its upper part being jettied, The windows are casements, and there is one dormer.	II
Calveley Hall; 53.1216°N 2.8167°W		1684	The country house was remodelled in 1880, and further alterations were made during the 20th century. It is built in rendered brick on a stone plinth, and has slate roofs. The entrance front is symmetrical, with three storeys, and is in seven bays, the lateral bays being recessed. The doorcase has columns and a semi-circular fanlight. The windows are sashes.	II*
Gate piers and walls, Calveley Hall; 53.12149°N 2.81595°W		Late 17th century	The garden walls are in brick with a stone coping, and surround three sides of a rectangular garden. The gate piers are on the east side, and are built in sandstone. Each pier has a capstone, and a cap with a ball finial.	II
Langford House; 53.1147°N 2.7975°W		Late 17th century	Originating as two cottages and later converted into a house, the building was extended in the 18th century and renovated in the 20th century. It is mostly timber-framed on a stone plinth, with some parts in rendered brick, and it has a slate roof. The house is in two storeys, with a four-bay front. The windows are casements.	II
Milton Green Farmhouse; 53.12477°N 2.80586°W		Early 19th century	The farmhouse is built in brick on a stone base and has a slate roof. It has two storeys, a symmetrical three-bay front, and a moulded cornice. Above the central round-headed doorcase is a fanlight. The windows are sashes.	II
Well House Farmhouse; 53.1135°N 2.8026°W		Early to mid-19th century	The farmhouse is built in brick with a slate roof, and has an L-shaped plan. There are two storeys, and a symmetrical three-bay front. The doorcase is in Doric style with a fanlight, and the windows are sashes.	II

== See also ==
- Listed buildings in Aldersey
- Listed buildings in Aldford
- Listed buildings in Chowley
- Listed buildings in Coddington
- Listed buildings in Golborne David
- Listed buildings in Saighton
- Listed buildings in Tattenhall
