= Listed buildings in Golborne David =

Golborne David is a civil parish in Cheshire West and Chester, England. It contains five buildings that are recorded in the National Heritage List for England as designated listed buildings, all of which are at Grade II. This grade is the lowest of the three gradings given to listed buildings and is applied to "buildings of national importance and special interest". The parish is entirely rural, the listed buildings consisting of two farmhouses, a barn, a bridge, and a boundary stone.

Name and location	Photograph	Date	Notes
Corn barn, Golborne Old Hall; 53.1329°N 2.8052°W		Late 17th century	A brick barn with a slate roof. It has two storeys, and a rectangular plan, and is in three bays. It has an elliptical-headed entrance and tall ventilation slots.
Golborne Old Hall; 53.1324°N 2.8050°W		1682	Alterations and additions were made in 1727 and in the late 19th century. It is a brick farmhouse on a stone plinth, with stone dressings and a slate roof. The building is in three storeys, and has a three-bay front. The doorcase is in Doric style, with rusticated pilasters, above which is a plaque. There is one canted bay window, the other windows being two-light mullioned windows and casements.
Golbornebridge Farmhouse; 53.1273°N 2.8070°W	—	Mid-18th century	Incorporated into the farmhouse are re-used timbers, and the farmhouse was altered and extended in the mid-19th century. It is constructed in stuccoed brick with slate roofs, and has a double-pile plan. The farmhouse has two storeys, and its core has a symmetrical three-bay front. The lateral bays contain canted bay windows. There is a simple wooden porch, and the windows are sashes.
Golborne Bridge; 53.12696°N 2.80644°W		Late 18th century (probable)	The bridge is in red sandstone ashlar, and carries the A41 road across Golborne Brook. It consists of a single semi-circular arch carried on low piers. It has a plain parapet with rounded coping. To the north is another arch for flood water; the two arches are separated by a cutwater.
Boundary stone 53.12709°N 2.80638°W		Early 19th century	This parish boundary consists of a red sandstone block standing on the east side of the A41 road to the north of Golborne Bridge. It has a semi-circular plan and is inscribed with "Golbourne" and an Ordnance Survey benchmark.

== See also ==
- Listed buildings in Aldford
- Listed buildings in Golborne Bellow
- Listed buildings in Handley
- Listed buildings in Hargrave
- Listed buildings in Huxley
- Listed buildings in Saighton
- Listed buildings in Tattenhall
