= Broxton =

Broxton may refer to:

- Broxton, Cheshire, England
- Broxton, Oklahoma, United States
- Broxton, Georgia, United States
- Jonathan Broxton (born 1984), baseball player
- Broxton (system on chip), code name for an Intel Atom system on chip platform
