= Calveley Hall =

Country house in Cheshire, England

Coordinates: 53.12158°N 2.81673°W

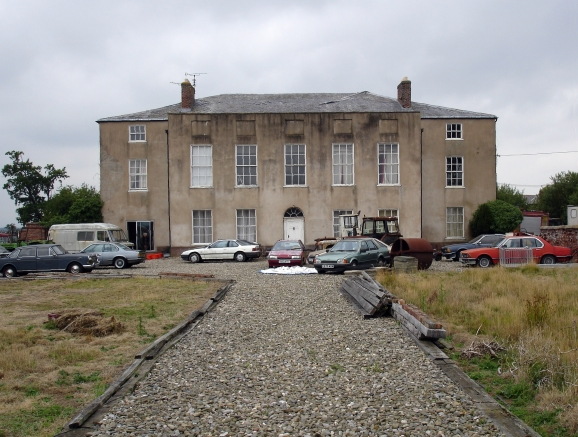
- Interactive map of Calveley Hall

General information
- Location: Milton Green, England
- Year built: 1684
- Renovated: 1818

Listed Building – Grade II*
- Official name: Calveley Hall
- Designated: 22 October 1952
- Reference no.: 1278640

Calveley Hall is a country house to the west of the village of Milton Green, Cheshire, England. It was built in 1684 for Lady Mary Calveley. After Lady Mary's death the estate passed by marriage to the Leghs of Lyme. In 1818 it was remodelled for Thomas Legh, and further alterations have been carried out during the 20th century.

The house and estates in excess of 4,000 acres (1,600 ha) around Aldersey, Aldford, Golborne David and Handley were put up for sale in 1827 to satisfy a judgement in the Court of Chancery. The hall and at least some of the lands were bought by George Woolrich, who then attempted to sell some parcels of it. In 1830, Woolrich tried to lease out the hall itself. Edward Davies Davenport was living there by 1835. Robert Hopley was living there in 1841.

The house is constructed in rendered brick with stone quoins. It stands on a stone plinth, has hipped roofs in Welsh slate, and three brick chimneys. The entrance front has three storeys, and is symmetrical with seven bays, the bays at the ends being slightly set back. The architectural historian Nikolaus Pevsner describes it as being "absolutely plain". Inside the house is a broad staircase with double twisted balusters, and newels carved with coats of arms, including those of Lady Mary. One of the rooms in the upper floor has an overmantel carved with the Calveley arms. The hall is recorded in the National Heritage List for England as a designated Grade II* listed building. The gate piers and front garden walls are listed at Grade II.

In 2006 the building was in a poor state of repair and as of 2022 the building is on the Buildings at Risk Register.

== See also ==
- Grade II* listed buildings in Cheshire West and Chester
- Listed buildings in Handley, Cheshire
