= Milton Green, Cheshire =

Coordinates: 53°7′25.6″N 2°48′21.86″W

Milton Green
- Hamlet
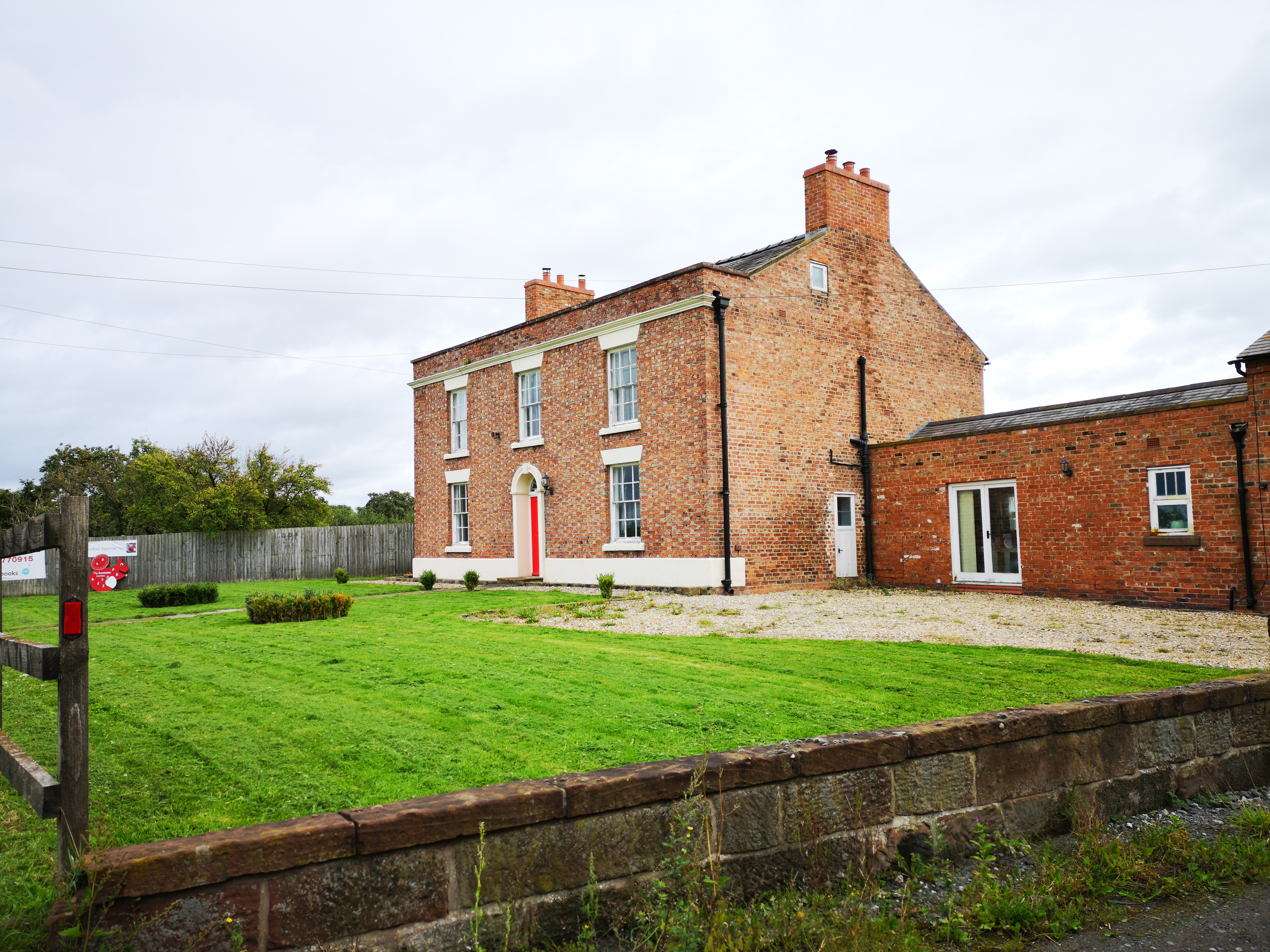
- Listed farmhouse at Milton Green

- Location within Cheshire
- OS grid reference: SJ461545
- Civil parish: Handley
- Unitary authority: Cheshire West and Chester
- Ceremonial county: Cheshire
- Region: North West
- Country: England
- Sovereign state: United Kingdom
- Post town: CHESTER
- Postcode district: CH3
- Dialling code: 01829
- Police: Cheshire
- Fire: Cheshire
- Ambulance: North West
- UK Parliament: Chester South and Eddisbury

Milton Green is a hamlet, 8 miles (13 km) south-south-east of Chester, in the unitary authority of Cheshire West and Chester and the ceremonial county of Cheshire, England. Milton Green is in the parish of Handley and the unitary authority ward of Tattenhall.

The A41 Whitchurch Road runs through the community, which predominantly consists of residential properties. The area has undergone some expansion in the twenty-first century: the Eaton Grange housing development was built in 2013 and at the A41 junction with Frog Lane, The Paddock group of properties were completed in 2019. The hamlet also has a Wesleyan Methodist chapel, a farm shop and a car dealership.

Calveley Hall is a large house near Milton Green that was designated a Grade II* listed building in 1952. Although built in 1684 it was remodelled in 1818 and has several modifications dating from the twentieth century. As of 2026 the house is in a poor state of repair and is listed on the Heritage at Risk Register. Milton Green Farmhouse was built in the early nineteenth century and was granted Grade II listed status in 1984.

== See also ==
- Listed buildings in Handley, Cheshire
