= Brown Knowl Methodist Church =

Coordinates: 53.0769°N 2.7546°W

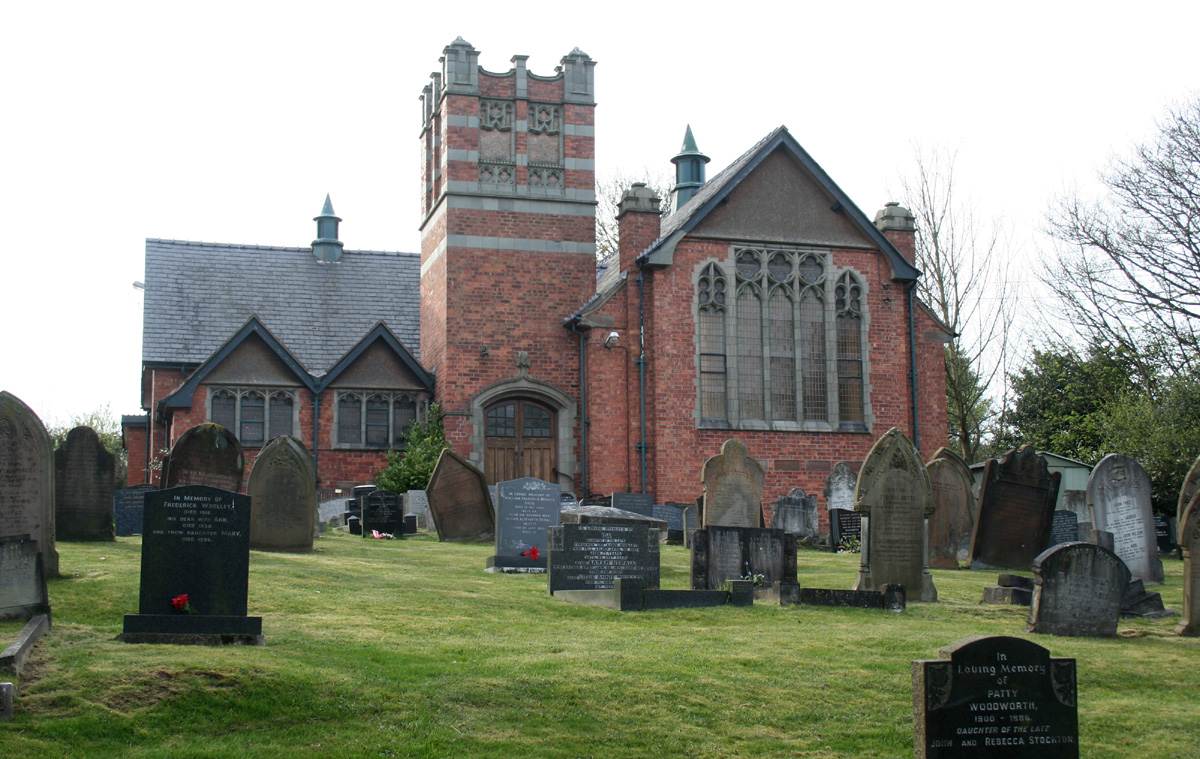
- Brown Knowl Methodist Church

- Location in Cheshire
- OS grid reference: SJ 496 536
- Location: Sherrington's Lane, Brown Knowl, Broxton, Cheshire
- Country: England
- Denomination: Methodist Church of Great Britain

Architecture
- Heritage designation: Grade II
- Designated: 19 June 1984
- Architectural type: Church
- Style: Gothic Revival
- Completed: 1913

Specifications
- Materials: Brick with stone dressings Slate roof

Brown Knowl Methodist Church is in Sherrington's Lane in the settlement of Brown Knowl in the civil parish of Broxton, Cheshire, England. The church, together with the former Sunday school, is recorded in the National Heritage List for England as a designated Grade II listed building.

== History ==
The church was built in 1913 to replace an earlier Primitive Methodist chapel of 1836 that was located nearby.

== Architecture ==
Constructed in red-brown brick with stone dressings, the church has a grey slate roof. The architectural style is Perpendicular. The church and the Sunday school together have an L-shaped plan, and in the angle between them is a tower and a vestry. Facing the road, the church on the right has a five-light window. To the left is a crenellated tower with traceried pebbledashed panels instead of bell openings. Further to the left is the former Sunday school, with two gables, each of which contains a three-light window. On the rear of the building is a date stone carrying the date of 1836.

== External features ==
In the churchyard is the tomb, dating from about 1869, of John Wedgwood and his wife. John Wedgwood was a local preacher who did much to promote Primitive Methodism locally, and was a distant relative of Josiah Wedgwood. The tomb is listed at Grade II.

== See also ==
- Listed buildings in Broxton, Cheshire
