= Sick To Death =

Visitor attraction in Chester

Coordinates: 53.1887°N 2.8907°W

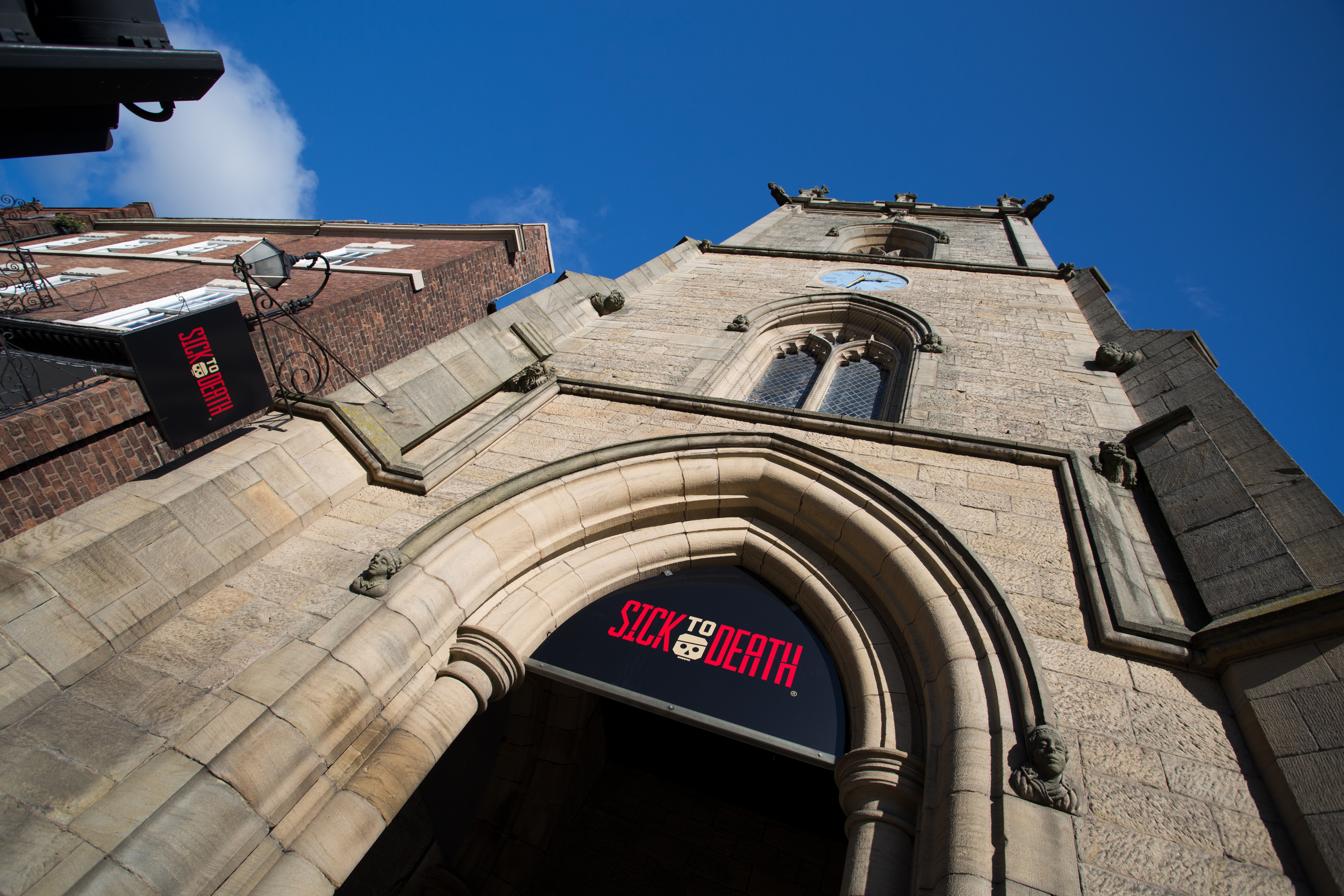

Sick to Death is a historical attraction located in St Michael's Church, a redundant church on the Bridge Street Rows, Chester, England. Opened in May 2021, it depicts the story of medicine through the ages, with a focus on pandemics and plagues. It has since become one of the top attractions in Chester, placing at #2 of things to do in Chester on Tripadvisor as of October 2021. Funded by the Wellcome Trust, Sick to Death is managed by Big Heritage who also manage the internationally renowned museum Western Approaches.
