= The Rookery, Tattenhall =

Country house in Cheshire, England

Coordinates: 53.12356°N 2.77062°W

The Rookery is a former country house in the village of Tattenhall, Cheshire, England. The house was originally owned by the Orton family. It was reconstructed in 1909 for F. W. Wignall of the Tate & Lyle company. It has since been used as a nursing home. The house is timber-framed on a stone plinth. It is recorded in the National Heritage List for England as a designated Grade II listed building.

== See also ==
- Listed buildings in Tattenhall
