= Broxton Old Hall =

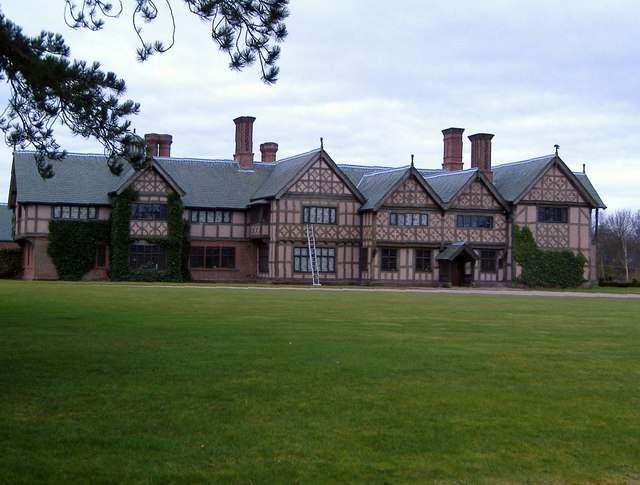
- Broxton Old Hall

- Location in Cheshire
- 53.0743°N 2.7671°W
- Location: Broxton, Cheshire, England
- OS grid reference: SJ 487,533

History
- Built: 1595
- Built for: Thomas Dod, Sir Philip de Grey Egerton

Site notes
- Architect(s): John Douglas (1873 extension)
- Architectural style: Black-and-white Revival
- Restored: 1873 (extension)

Listed Building – Grade II
- Designated: 22 October 1952
- Reference no.: 1229906

Broxton Old Hall (or Broxton Higher Hall) is in Old Coach Road 0.5 miles (1 km) west of the village of Brown Knowl, in the civil parish of Broxton, Cheshire, England. It is recorded in the National Heritage List for England as a designated Grade II listed building.

== History ==
The site has been occupied since before 1327. The oldest surviving part of the present house dates from 1595, when it was built for Thomas Dod. In 1873 the house was extended, incorporating fabric from the older house, by the Chester architect John Douglas. This was commissioned by Sir Philip de Grey Egerton of Oulton Park as a dower house. Late-19th century occupants of the Hall included the calico printer William Graham Crum JP (son of the Scottish chemist Walter Crum and father of John Macleod Campbell Crum). It was purchased by Malcolm Walker, owner of the Iceland Food Store Chain, in 1985 for £750,000, and re-modelled and extended for him by The Carnell Green Partnership in 1987–88.

== Architecture ==
The house is timber-framed with oak frames and plaster panels. The roofs are of stone slates and have ornate bargeboards and finials. The chimneys consist of detached diagonal flues. The house is in two storeys. The original part of the house has four bays and two gables and a gabled porch. To the left of this part of the house is a recessed wing with one gable and to its right is a projecting wing with one gable. To the sides of each of these are further recessed wings, that to the left having a further gable. The windows are of oak; those in the upper storey have mullions and those in the lower storey have mullions and transoms. The architectural historian Nikolaus Pevsner described it as being "an ornate gabled black and white house".

The lodge to the hall is also listed Grade II. It is dated 1873, is a timber-framed building on a brick plinth and was designed by John Douglas. It has one storey and is in Jacobethan style.

== Gardens ==
The grounds of the hall contain a formal garden, garden terraces, lawns, a lake, follies and a yew avenue. The grounds are not open to the public. In the garden is a structure cut into a cliff and partly lined with blocks of sandstone. It dates from the early 19th century or before. Its base measures around 6m square and it is 4m high. On the floor are stone flags and the ceiling slopes to a central ridge. To its right is a shallow partly natural cave. The structure is a Grade II listed building. It has been described variously as a "stone parlour", a grotto, or King James' Parlour.

== See also ==
- Listed buildings in Broxton, Cheshire
- List of houses and associated buildings by John Douglas
