= St Alban's Church, Tattenhall =

Coordinates: 53.1222°N 2.7688°W

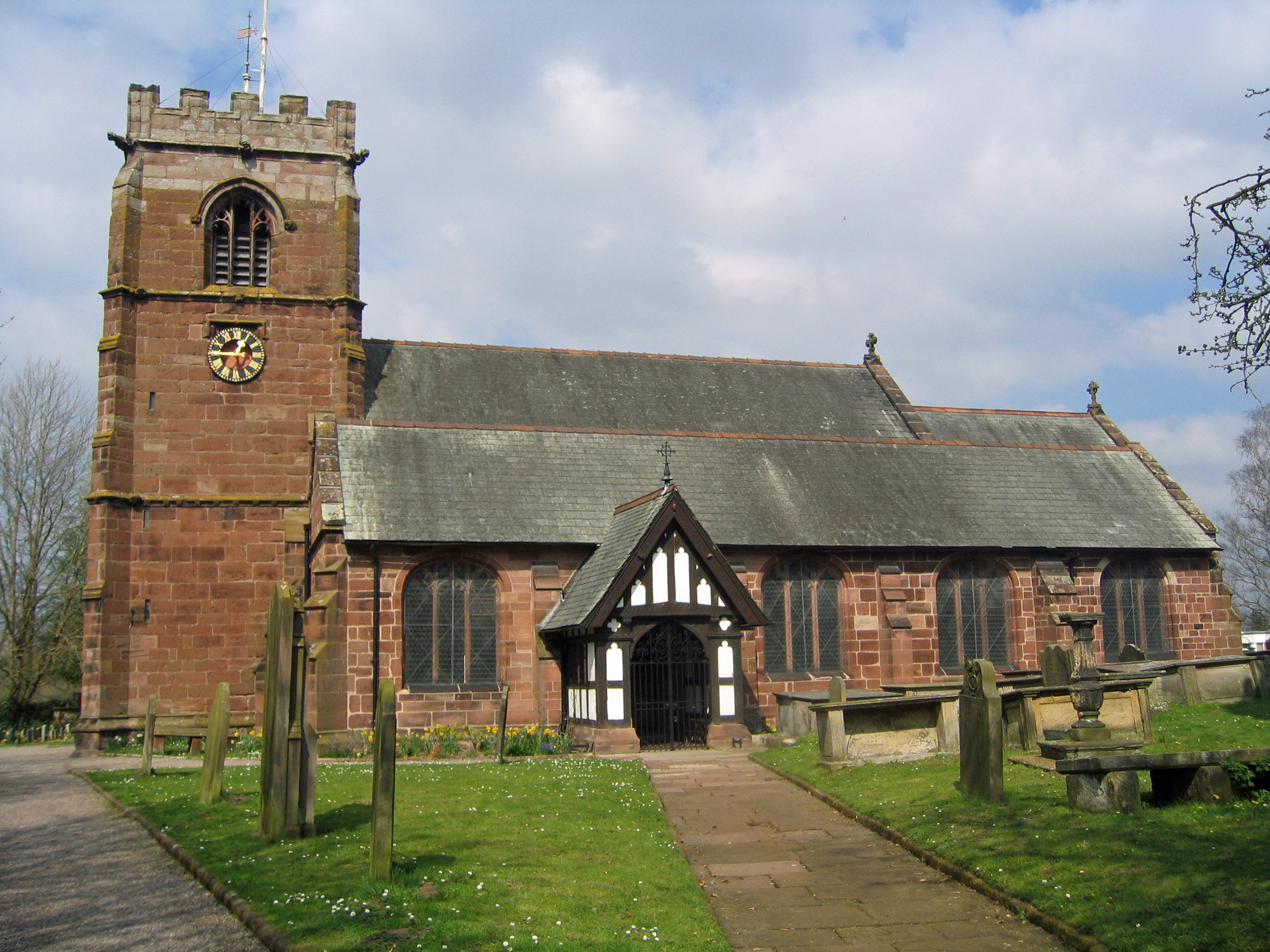
- St Alban's Church, Tattenhall, from the south

- Location in Cheshire
- OS grid reference: SJ 486,585
- Location: Tattenhall, Cheshire
- Country: England
- Denomination: Anglican
- Website: St. Alban's Church, Tattenhall

History
- Status: Parish church
- Dedication: Saint Alban

Architecture
- Functional status: Active
- Heritage designation: Grade II*
- Designated: 1 March 1967
- Architect: John Douglas
- Architectural type: Church
- Style: Gothic Revival

Specifications
- Materials: Ashlar red sandstone Green slate roof

Administration
- Province: York
- Diocese: Chester
- Archdeaconry: Chester
- Deanery: Malpas
- Parish: Tattenhall

Clergy
- Rector: Revd Lameck Mutete

St Alban's Church is in the village of Tattenhall, Cheshire, England. It is an active Anglican parish church in the diocese of Chester, the archdeaconry of Chester and the deanery of Malpas. Its benefice is combined with that of All Saints, Handley. The church is recorded in the National Heritage List for England as a designated Grade II* listed building.

== History ==
It is thought that a church may have existed on this site at the time of the Norman conquest. The tower and parts of the present church date from the early 16th century. The church was restored and largely remodelled in 1869–70 by John Douglas. During this time the remains of an earlier church which had been destroyed by fire were discovered. Also discovered were a skeleton of a large man outside the north wall and a coffin containing bones under the floor of the church.

== Architecture ==
=== Exterior ===
The church is constructed of ashlar red sandstone and it has a green slate roof. The plan consists of a four-bay nave, five-bay north and south aisles, a two-bay chancel, a three-stage west tower and a south porch. The tower has a west door above which is a three-light window. On either side of this are square tablets which are carved with shields and initials, the significance of which is not known. The belfry windows are of three lights above which is a string course with gargoyles. The top is embattled. The south porch, which was dated 1672, was replaced in 1893 by one of timber and plaster.

=== Interior ===
In the church is a brass chandelier dated 1755. On the south wall of the chancel is a stained glass window which contains some medieval glass and depicts images of St Alban and St Stephen, and the coat of arms of the Touchet family. In the south aisle is a window by Kempe dated 1896. The stained glass in the east window is by Hardman and dates from about 1870. The glass from a similar date in the west window is by Lavers and Westlake. There is a ring of six bells. Three of these are by Henry Oldfield II and dated 1596, two are by Gabriel Smith and dated 1710, and the other bell dated 1904 is by John Taylor and Company. The parish registers begin in 1654 and the churchwardens' accounts are from 1764.

== External features ==
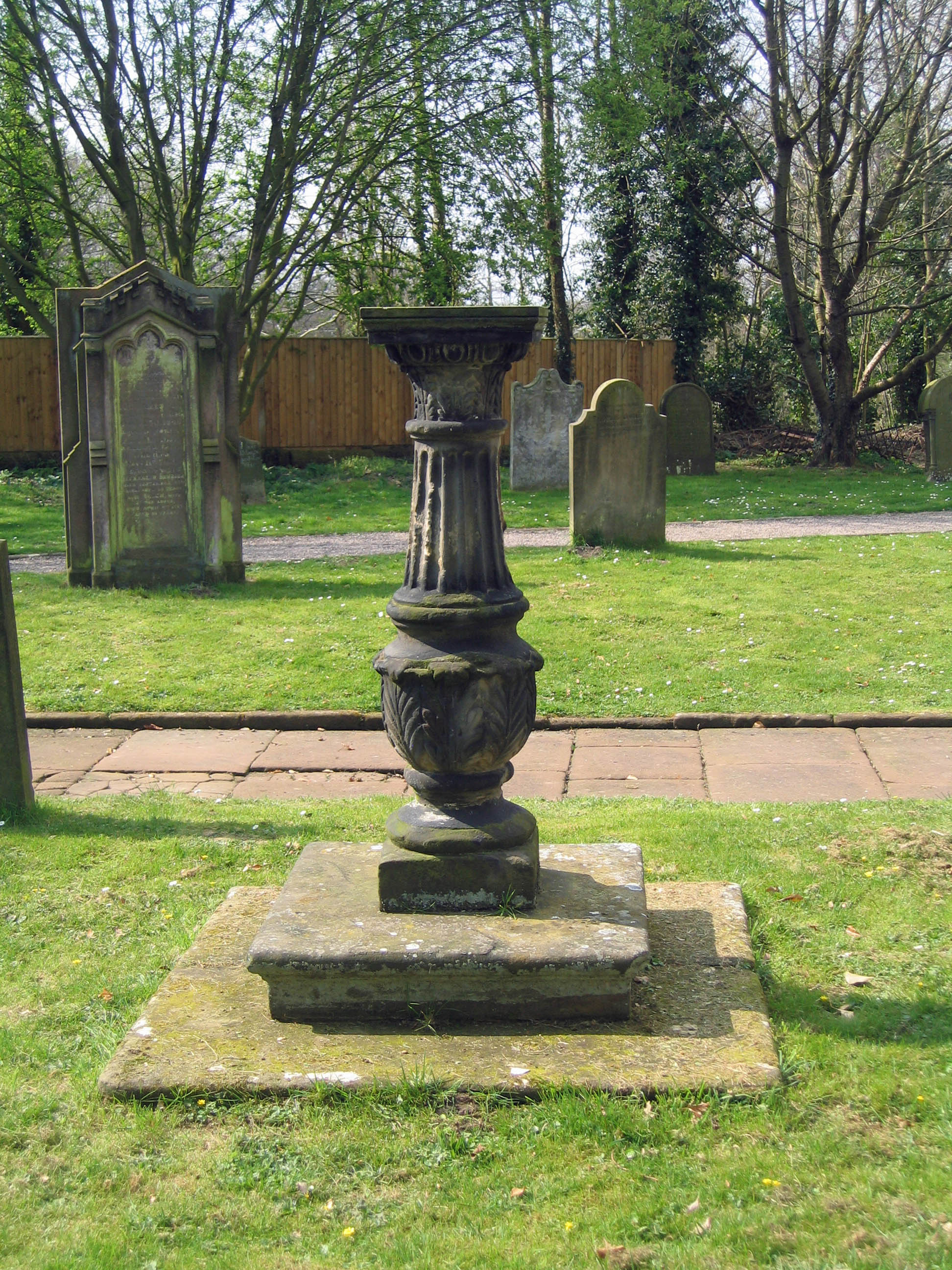
Sundial in churchyard

In the churchyard is a sundial of ashlar buff sandstone dating from the 18th century which was restored in the 20th century. It is listed at Grade II. The churchyard also contains the war graves of a soldier of World War I, and two of World War II.

== See also ==
- Grade II* listed buildings in Cheshire West and Chester
- Listed buildings in Tattenhall
- List of church restorations, amendments and furniture by John Douglas
