= Leslie Jones (cricketer) =

English cricketer

Personal information
- Full name: Leslie Norman Jones
- Born: 13 July 1891; Tattenhall, Cheshire, England
- Died: 8 January 1962 (aged 70); Chester, Cheshire, England
- Batting: Right-handed
- Bowling: Right-arm (unknown style)

Domestic team information
- Years: Team
- 1937: Minor Counties
- 1910–1938: Cheshire

Career statistics
Competition	First-class
Matches	1
Runs scored	13
Batting average	13.00
100s/50s	–/–
Top score	9*
Balls bowled	61
Wickets	7
Bowling average	3.14
5 wickets in innings	1
10 wickets in match	–
Best bowling	5/8
Catches/stumpings	–/–
- Source: Cricinfo, 14 August 2012

Leslie Norman Jones (13 July 1891 – 8 January 1962) was an English cricketer. Jones was a right-handed batsman who was a right-arm bowler, although his bowling style is unknown. He was born at Tattenhall, Cheshire.

Jones made his debut for Cheshire against Northumberland in the 1910 Minor Counties Championship at Boughton Hall Cricket Club Ground. He made eighteen appearances in the Minor Counties Championship for Cheshire before World War I, after which he returned to play for the county. He played minor counties cricket for Cheshire from 1920 to 1938, making 139 further appearances for the county in the Minor Counties Championship, the last of which came against the Yorkshire Second XI. He was also Cheshire captain from 1931 to 1934. Playing minor counties cricket for Cheshire allowed Jones to be selected to play for a combined Minor Counties cricket team, with him making a single first-class appearance for the team at the age of 45 against Ireland in 1937 at Observatory Lane, Rathmines. Ireland won the toss and elected to bat first, making 102 all out, with Jones taking the wickets of Frank Quinn and George Crothers, to finish with figures of 2/14 from four overs. The Minor Counties were then dismissed for just 69 in their first-innings, with Jones ending the innings not out on 9. Ireland improved in their second-innings, making 179 all out, with Jones taking five wickets to finish with figures of 5/8 from 6.1 overs. Set 213 for victory, the Minor Counties were dismissed for 113, with Jones making 4 runs before he was dismissed by James Boucher.

His brother and nephew, both named William, also played for and captained Cheshire. He died at Chester, Cheshire, on 8 January 1962.
