= James Harrison (architect) =

English architect (1814–1866)

James Harrison (1814–1866) was an English architect who practised in Chester, Cheshire, England. He is considered to be a pioneer of the Black-and-white Revival, an example of which is 51–53, Bridge Street, Chester, built in 1858. In 1862 he rebuilt the medieval timber-framed God's Providence House in Chester, which has been described as "the first conservation case in the modern sense". He designed new churches in Gothic Revival style, some of which have been designated as listed buildings, including Holy Ascension Church, Upton by Chester, Holy Trinity Church, Capenhurst, St Luke's Church, Dunham on the Hill, and Holy Trinity Church, Chester. Harrison also made alterations to other churches, including the virtual rebuilding of St Michael's Church, Chester, rebuilding the nave of All Saints Church, Handley, and working on the tower of the Church of St Mary-on-the Hill, Chester. He designed the Trustee Savings Bank in Chester, and converted the medieval St Nicholas' Chapel in Chester into a concert hall. Harrison worked for Robert Balfour, building farms on his Bolesworth estate, and at Tattenhall Hall.

== See also ==
- List of works by James Harrison
