= St Nicholas Chapel, Chester =

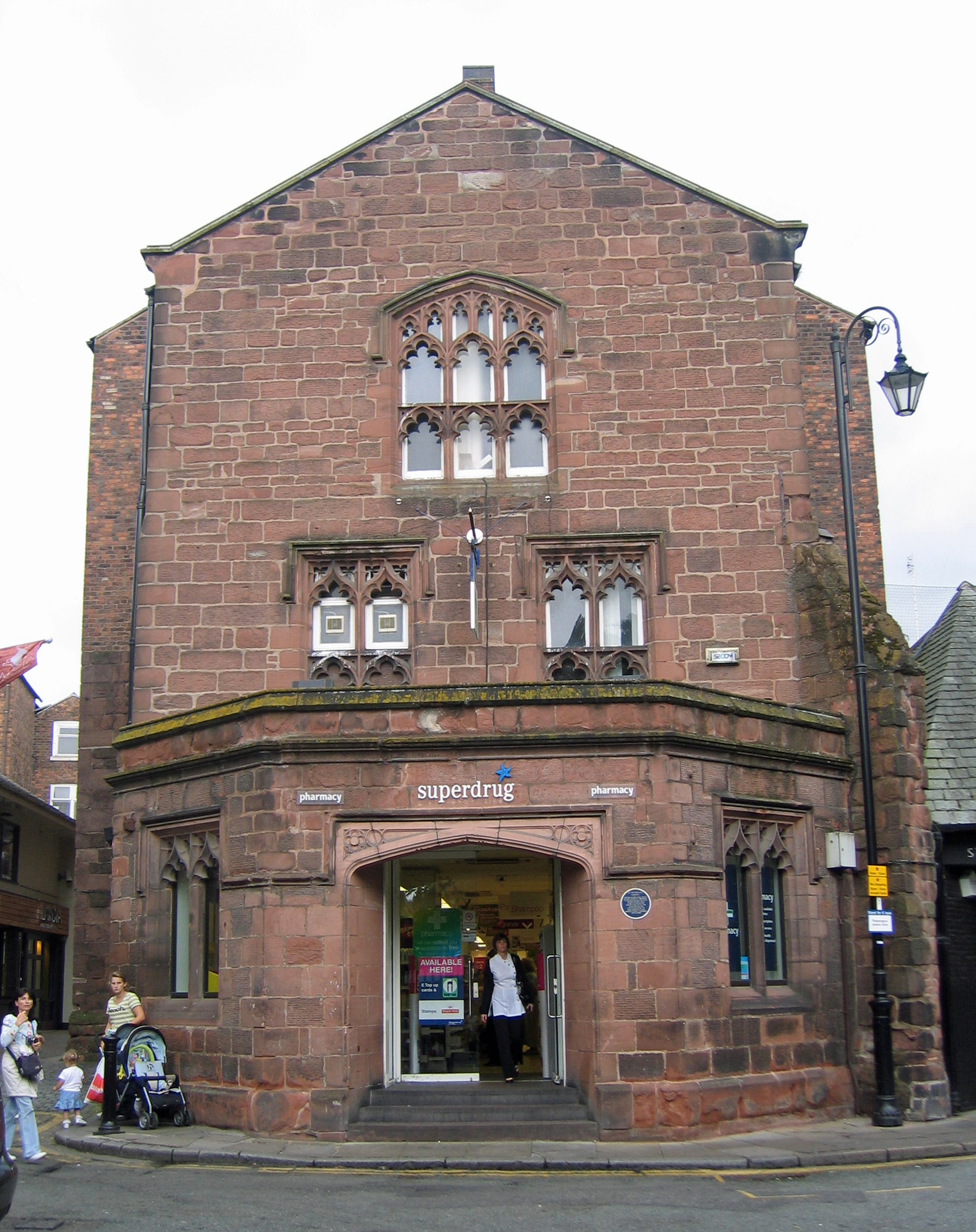
- St Nicholas Chapel

- Location in Cheshire
- 53.19129°N 2.89093°W
- OS grid reference: SJ 405 663

History
- Built: c. 1300
- Built for: Simon de Albo

Site notes
- Architectural style: Gothic

Listed Building – Grade II
- Designated: 28 July 1955
- Reference no.: 1376350

Scheduled monument
- Reference no.: 1006777

St Nicholas Chapel is a former chapel in St Werburgh Street, Chester, Cheshire, England. Since it ceased functioning as a chapel it has had a number of uses, including being at one time a theatre. It is now used as a shop. It is recorded in the National Heritage List for England as a designated Grade II listed building, and is a scheduled monument.

== History ==
The chapel was built in about 1300 for Simon de Albo, the abbot of St Werburgh's, Chester. It was used for a period as the church of the parish of St Oswald, then closed as a church and conveyed to the Mayor and Assembly of Chester in 1488. In 1545 an upper floor was inserted and it was used as the Commonhall and Wool Hall. The building was used for staging plays from around 1750, then further converted as the New Theatre in 1773 and the Theatre Royal in 1777–78. James Harrison modified it again into a hall for concerts and entertainments in 1854–55, when it was known as the Music Hall. It was later used as a cinema, and then as a shop. The alleyway to the side of the building, from Saint Werburgh Street to Northgate Street, is called Music Hall Passage.

== Architecture ==
It is built in sandstone and brick with grey slate gabled roofs in two storeys. Some medieval stonework remains on the south side. The Gothic style front is by James Harrison.

== See also ==
- Grade II listed buildings in Chester (central)
- List of works by James Harrison
