= Austin Carr (cricketer) =

English cricketer

Cricket information
- Batting: Right-handed

Career statistics
Competition	First-class
Matches	6
Runs scored	150
Batting average	15.00
100s/50s	0/1
Top score	82
Balls bowled	12
Wickets	0
Bowling average	–
5 wickets in innings	–
10 wickets in match	–
Best bowling	–
Catches/stumpings	2/–
- Source: CricInfo, 14 April 2023

Austin Michael Carr (29 September 1898 – 20 December 1946) was an English cricketer who played six first-class matches for Worcestershire in the 1920s.

Carr had an unusual introduction to first-class cricket. Worcestershire, short of players, sent out a call to Gilbert Ashton, headmaster of Abberley Hall School and a man who was to play a number of times for the county in the years ahead. However, Ashton was unwell and so sent Carr, a junior member of the school staff. Carr tried to protest that he was not good enough, but in the event he succeeded magnificently, scoring 82 from number eight in the order. He also bowled two overs without reward: his only bowling spell in first-class cricket. In the second innings he was promoted to bat at three, but was dismissed for 17.

After such a performance, Carr was chosen for two more matches that season, one of them against a Nottinghamshire team captained by his namesake Arthur Carr and the other against Lancashire. He could manage only 4, 28 and 2 in his three innings, however, and was no more successful (making 7, 4 and 2) in the couple of games he played in 1922. He was to play only one more first-class match, three years later against Somerset, but again he failed to make a significant score, making 0 and 4 in an innings defeat.

Carr was born at Lower Hall, Broxton, Cheshire; he died at the age of 48 in Great Witley, Worcestershire.

His brother Edward played for Cheshire at minor counties level in 1912.
