= Harry Threadgold =

English footballer

Personal information
- Full name: Joseph Henry Threadgold
- Date of birth: 6 November 1924
- Place of birth: Tattenhall, England
- Date of death: 1996 (aged 71–72)
- Place of death: Southend-on-Sea, England
- Position: Goalkeeper

Youth career
- Tarvin United

Senior career*
Years	Team	Apps	(Gls)
1950–1952	Chester	83	(0)
1952–1953	Sunderland	35	(0)
1953–1963	Southend United	343	(0)
Total		438	(0)
- * Club domestic league appearances and goals

Joseph Henry Threadgold (1924–1996) was a footballer who played as a goalkeeper in the Football League initially for Chester.

He also played for Sunderland and spent 10 years at Southend United from July 1953 until 1963. He retired in May 1963.

He was born on 6 November 1924 in Tattenhall, Cheshire and died in 1996, his ashes were scattered at Roots Hall, Southend United's ground.
