= Herbert Watkins-Pitchford =

Herbert Watkins-Pitchford FRSE CMG (3 June 1866 – 25 June 1951) was a British veterinarian. In 1896, with Arnold Theiler, he was the first to create a successful vaccine against the viral disease of cattle rinderpest.

== Life ==
He was born on 3 June 1866 in Tattenhall in Cheshire, the son of Rev John Watkins Pitchford (1836–1912) and his wife, Louisa Read. He was older brother to the bacteriologist Wilfred Watkins-Pitchford. He was educated at Queen Elizabeth's Grammar School.

He studied at the Royal Veterinary College, London graduating in 1889. Following graduation he practiced as a vet in Camberley until 1895. In 1896, during the period of growing unrest in South Africa, he served as Principal Veterinary Surgeon to Natal Colony. In 1898 he was promoted to Director of the Department of Disease Research, in Pietermaritzburg. During the Second Boer War (1899–1902) he was a major of the Natal Carabineers, and he received the Queen's South African Badge with two bars.

In 1901 he was promoted to Government Bacteriologist and Director of Veterinary Services for Natal, and in 1903 he became Director of the Natal Museum.

In 1906 he was elected a Fellow of the Royal Society of Edinburgh. His proposers were Cathcart Methven, William Anderson, Sir German Sims Woodhead and Diarmid Noel Paton.

Following the creation of South Africa in 1910, Watkins-Pitchford hoped to be appointed Director of Veterinary Services, but this post instead went to his colleague, Arnold Theiler. although offered the post of Deputy Director he instead decided to leave South Africa. In 1912 he returned to England to join the British Army. At the outbreak of the First World War he became a Lt Colonel in the Royal Army Veterinary Remount Commission overseeing horse conscription and inspection in the wake of huge losses of animals at the front.

In 1922 he became Commander of the Army Veterinary School in Aldershot.

He retired in 1935 and returned to South Africa. He died on 25 June 1951 in Illovo in Natal, South Africa.

== Family ==
In 1892 he married May Emily Wilson. They had a son born in 1900, and a daughter, Phyllis.

== Publications ==
- Epilepsy in Dogs (1894)
