= God's Providence House, Chester =

God's Providence House
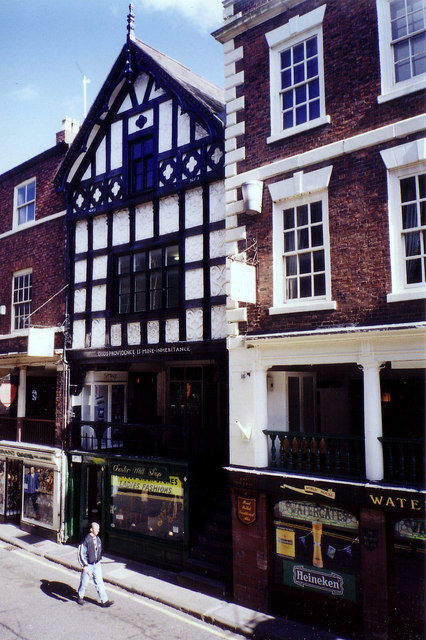
- God's Providence House, Chester
- Interactive map of God's Providence House
- 53.1901°N 2.8926°W
- Location: 9 Watergate Street and 11–11A Watergate Row, Chester, Cheshire, England
- OS grid reference: SJ 404,662

History
- Built: 13th century 1652
- Rebuilt: 1862

Site notes
- Restored by: James Harrison (1862)

Listed Building – Grade II
- Official name: No.9 Street and Nos.11 & 11A Row (God's Providence House)
- Designated: 28 July 1955
- Reference no.: 1376422

God's Providence House is at 9 Watergate Street and 11–11A Watergate Row, Chester, Cheshire, England. The house incorporates part of the Chester Rows, is recorded in the National Heritage List for England as a designated Grade II listed building, and is included in the English Heritage Archive.

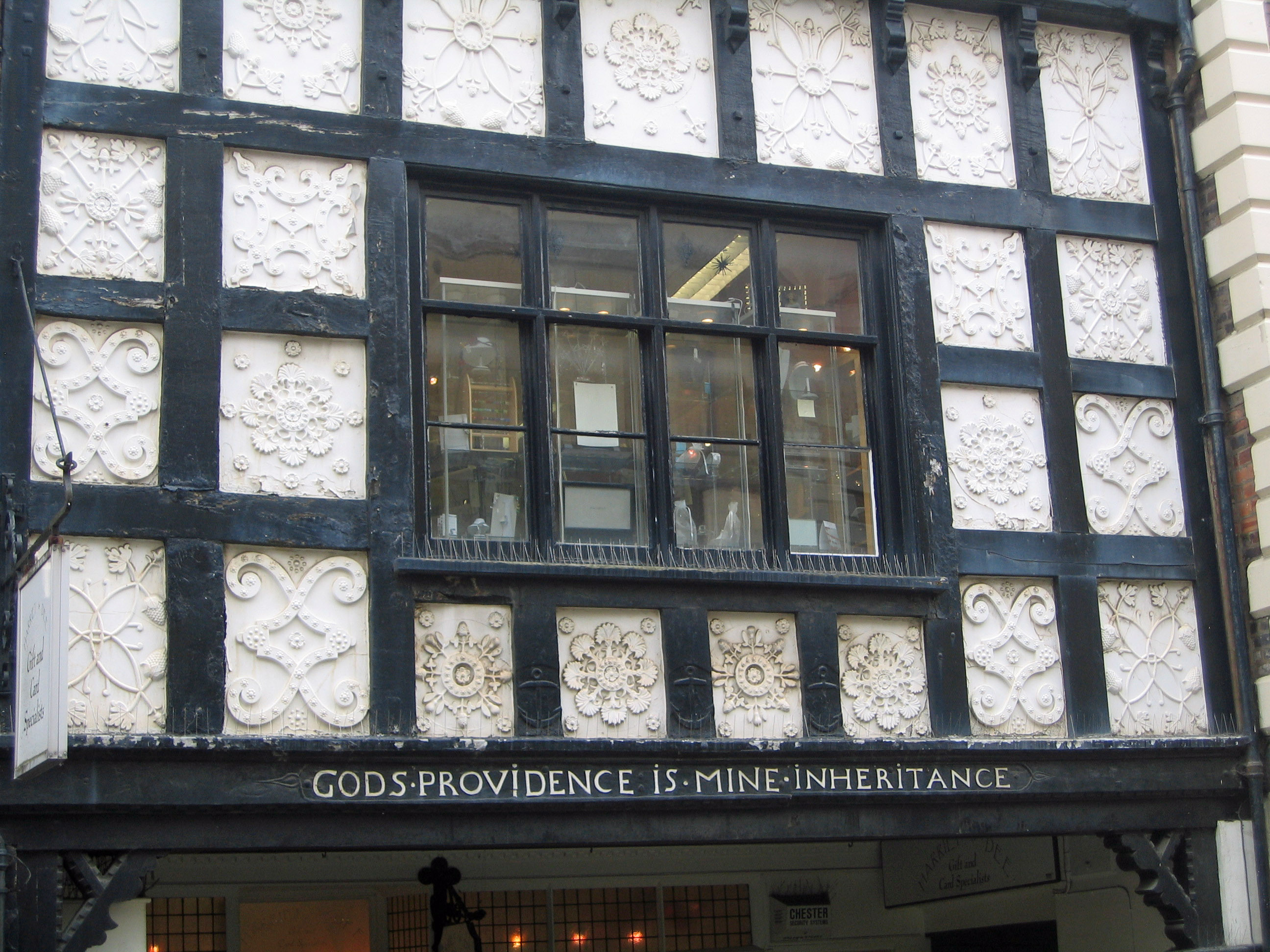
Close-up to show the inscription

== History ==
The original building on the site was constructed in the 13th century but the present house was built in 1652. During the 19th century its owners wanted to demolish it but around this time the Chester and North Wales Architectural, Archaeological and Historical Society were campaigning against the loss of ancient buildings in the city. The owners agreed to a timber replacement of the building which was carried out by James Harrison in 1862, paid for by Robert Gregg, Rope and Twine Manufacturer and later, Mayor of Chester. His initials are on a plaque towards the top of the building. James Harrison incorporated some of the timberwork from the original house, and designed a larger and more elaborate building.

The name of the house is reputed to come from its being the only house to have escaped the outbreak of plague in 1647–48 which killed 2,000 people in the city. However this house was not built until after the plague and it is more likely that it refers to the owners of the previous building on the site being spared the disease.

== Architecture ==
The house is part of a terrace on the south side of Watergate Street. It is built in sandstone and timber framing with plaster panels and a slate roof. It has four storeys and a gable overlooking the street. At the street level is a modern shop front and, to the right, a set of concrete steps leading up to the row level. Set back at this level is another modern shop front. Overlooking the street is a Jacobean style railing. Above the row level is a fascia board inscribed "GOD'S PROVIDENCE IS MINE INHERITANCE". In the centre of the third storey is a central nine-pane casement window, surrounded by timber framing with recessed moulded plaster panels. Across the base of the attic storey is a row of quatrefoil braces, with a four-pane window in the centre. At the sides and above the window is more timber framing with panels similar to those on the third storey. At the top of the gable is an elaborately carved bargeboard and, at its summit, a finial. Internally in the undercroft at street level, some 13th-century sandstone fabric is still present in the east party wall.

== Literature ==
The building features in the novel God's Providence House: A Story of 1791 (1865) by Isabella Banks.

== See also ==
- Grade II listed buildings in Chester (central)
- List of works by James Harrison
