= Golborne David =

Civil parish in Cheshire, England

Coordinates: 53.133°N 2.806°W

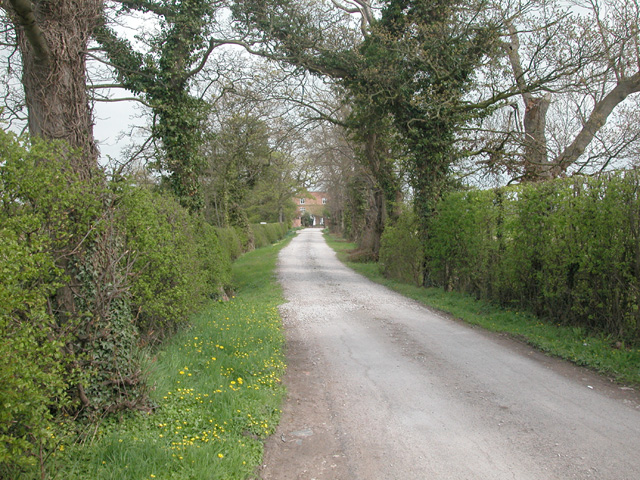
- Golborne Old Hall

- Location within Cheshire
- Population: 253 (2011 census) (Note: The ONS 2011 population figure includes the civil parishes of Chowley, Handley and Golborne David)
- OS grid reference: SJ462598
- Civil parish: Golborne David
- Unitary authority: Cheshire West and Chester
- Ceremonial county: Cheshire
- Region: North West
- Country: England
- Sovereign state: United Kingdom
- Post town: CHESTER
- Postcode district: CH3
- Dialling code: 01829
- Police: Cheshire
- Fire: Cheshire
- Ambulance: North West
- UK Parliament: Chester South and Eddisbury

Golborne David is a civil parish in the unitary authority of Cheshire West and Chester and ceremonial county of Cheshire, England. It is part of the local government ward of Tattenhall.

In the 2001 census it had a population of 55. The Office for National Statistics combined this figure with the neighbouring civil parishes of Chowley and Handley, with the total given as 227. In the 2011 census these parishes were again combined, with the total population recorded as 253.

== History ==
The name Golborne means "marigold stream" and likely derives from the Old English words golde (marigold) and burna (a stream). During the thirteenth century, David de Golberne held this part, with the remainder known as Golborne Bellow.

Golborne was mentioned in the Domesday Book of 1086 as Colburne, with ownership divided between William Malbank and Osbern, son of Tezzo. The entry lists eight households.

Golborne David was a township within Handley parish of Broxton Hundred, which became a civil parish in 1866. The population was recorded at 62 in 1801, 74 in 1851, 67 in 1901, 59 in 1951 and decreasing slightly to 55 by 2001.

== See also ==
- Listed buildings in Golborne David
