= Chowley =

Hamlet in Cheshire, England

Coordinates: 53.102°N 2.784°W

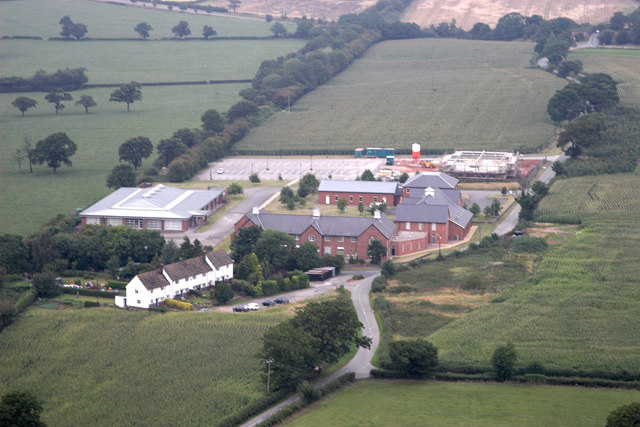
- Chowley Oak Business Park

- Location within Cheshire
- Population: 253 (2011 census) (Note: The ONS 2011 population figure includes the civil parishes of Chowley, Handley and Golborne David)
- OS grid reference: SJ4756
- Civil parish: Chowley
- Unitary authority: Cheshire West and Chester
- Ceremonial county: Cheshire
- Region: North West
- Country: England
- Sovereign state: United Kingdom
- Post town: CHESTER
- Postcode district: CH3
- Dialling code: 01829
- Police: Cheshire
- Fire: Cheshire
- Ambulance: North West
- UK Parliament: Chester South and Eddisbury

Chowley is a hamlet and civil parish in the Borough of Cheshire West and Chester and the ceremonial county of Cheshire, England. It is approximately 9.5 miles (15.3 km) south east of Chester and about 1.3 miles (2.1 km) south west of Tattenhall.

In the 2001 census Chowley had a population of 23. The census statistics have been combined with the neighbouring civil parishes of Handley and Golborne David, and the figure was given as 227. In the 2011 census these parishes were again combined, with the population recorded as 253.

== History ==
The name Chowley means "Ceola's wood/clearing" and likely derives from the Old English personal name Ceola and the word lēah (a wood, forest, glade or clearing).

Mentioned as Celelea in the Domesday Book of 1086, it was partial woodland and consisted of only two households, which belonged to "riders" (roadmen). The landowner was Robert FitzHugh (son of Hugh Lupus), having previously been in the possession of Wulfeva, a free woman.

Chowley was a township in Coddington parish, Broxton Hundred, which became a civil parish in 1866. Its population was 56 in 1801, then 58 in 1851, 35 in 1901 and increasing to 65 by 1951.

== Landmarks ==
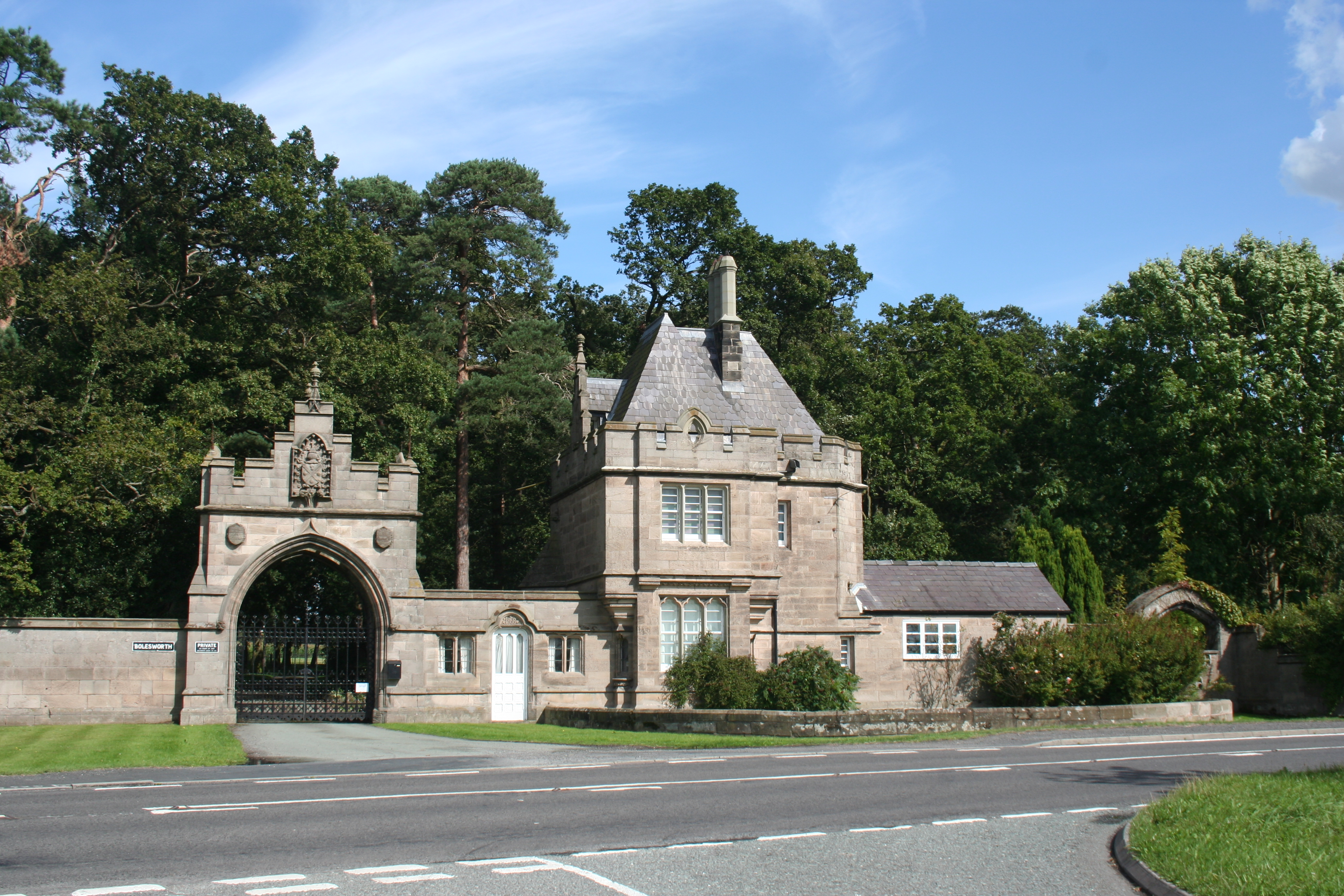
Chowley Lodge

The parish contains one structure designated by English Heritage as a listed building; this is Chowley Lodge, which is listed at Grade II. It was built in 1868 as a lodge to Bolesworth Castle and was designed by Alfred Waterhouse.
