= Guildhall, Chester =

Coordinates: 53.1899°N 2.8946°W

- Guildhall from St Martin's Way

- Location in Cheshire
- OS grid reference: SJ 403 663
- Location: Watergate Street, Chester, Cheshire
- Country: England
- Denomination: Anglican

History
- Former name(s): Holy Trinity Church, Chester

Architecture
- Functional status: Redundant
- Heritage designation: Grade II
- Designated: 28 July 1955
- Architect: James Harrison
- Architectural type: Church
- Style: Gothic Revival
- Completed: 1869

Specifications
- Materials: Red sandstone with slate roofs

The Guildhall, formerly Holy Trinity Church, is a redundant church in Watergate in the city of Chester, Cheshire, England. It is recorded in the National Heritage List for England as a designated Grade II listed building. The church closed in 1960, became known as the Guildhall, and was converted to be used for secular purposes.

== History ==
The original building, which had a north aisle, probably dated from the late 12th century. The east end and south side were rebuilt in 1678. This church had a spire which was rebuilt in the 1770s but in 1811 was taken down for reasons of safety. The present church was built between 1865 and 1869 to a design by James Harrison. He died before it was finished and the church was completed by the firm of Kelly and Edwards of Chester.

After the church deconsecrated in 1960, it was taken on by the Freemen and Guilds of the City of Chester in the late 1960s and converted into two halls, the Major Hall and the Lower Hall, for a variety of secular uses, including conferences, receptions, dances, and concerts.

In October 2011 the Freemen and Guilds of the City of Chester handed responsibility for the building back to the local council but secured continued access for banquets and other important functions. A new members' bar, branded as "The Guild Chester", opened in the guildhall in October 2019.

== Architecture ==
=== Exterior ===
It is built in red sandstone with grey slate roofs. Its plan consists of a continuous nave and chancel with a clerestory, a west porch, a detached south spire and porch, and a vestry to the south. The tower has three stages with double doors to the east and above this a relief sculpture of Christ enthroned. The second stage has a lancet window and clock faces to the east and south. The third stage has two-light bell-openings, corner buttresses, a pierced parapet and a recessed octagonal stone spire with three lucarnes to each face.

=== Interior ===
Most of the fittings have been removed. The east window, dated 1885, is by Kempe, and depicts God and major Old Testament figures and saints. Now hidden by flooring is a memorial to John Whitmore who died in 1374. The former chancel screen and the reredos are also hidden. There is a burial vault under the building which dates back to when the church was built.

== See also ==
- Guild
