= Handley, Cheshire =

Coordinates: 53.115°N 2.795°W

Handley
- Village
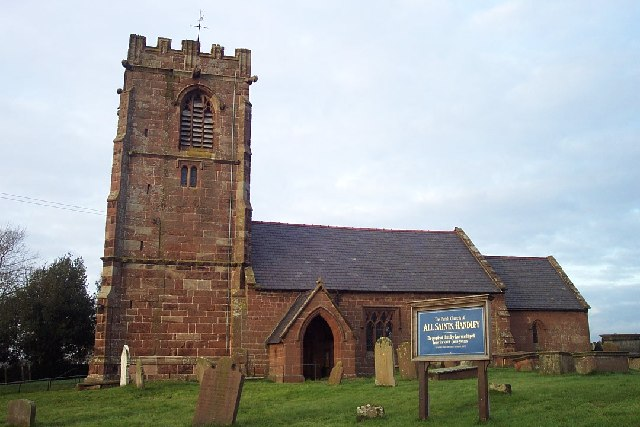
- All Saints' Church, Handley

- Location within Cheshire
- Population: 253 (2011 census) (Note: The ONS 2011 population figure includes the civil parishes of Chowley, Handley and Golborne David)
- OS grid reference: SJ467578
- Civil parish: Handley
- Unitary authority: Cheshire West and Chester
- Ceremonial county: Cheshire
- Region: North West
- Country: England
- Sovereign state: United Kingdom
- Post town: CHESTER
- Postcode district: CH3
- Dialling code: 01829
- Police: Cheshire
- Fire: Cheshire
- Ambulance: North West
- UK Parliament: Chester South and Eddisbury

Handley is a village and civil parish in the unitary authority of Cheshire West and Chester and the ceremonial county of Cheshire, England. It is part of the local government ward of Tattenhall, a larger settlement approximately 2 miles (3.2 km) to the east. The hamlet of Milton Green is to the north west of the village. The A41 road, which previously passed through the village now bypasses it, having been re-routed further to the east.

In the 2001 census Handley had a population of 149. The census statistics have been combined with the neighbouring civil parishes of Chowley and Golborne David, and the figure was given as 227. In the 2011 census these parishes were again combined, with the population recorded as 253.

== History ==
The name Handley means "at the high wood/clearing" and likely derives from the Old English words hēah (a high place) and lēah (a wood, forest, glade or clearing).

Handley was mentioned in the Domesday Book of 1086 as Hanlei, under the ownership of Osbern, son of Tezzo. The entry lists only four households (two villagers, one smallholder and one slave/servant), making it amongst the smallest 20% of settlements recorded in the survey.

The village was a township and parish within Broxton Hundred, which became a civil parish in 1866. The population was recorded at 203 in 1801, then 307 in 1851, 259 in 1901 and increasing to 277 by 1951.

== Landmarks ==
All Saints Church, Handley, is a Grade II* listed building. Nearby Calveley Hall dates from 1684 and is also a Grade II* listed building.

== See also ==
- Listed buildings in Handley, Cheshire
