= St Michael's Church, Chester =

Coordinates: 53.1887°N 2.8907°W

- St Michael's Church, Chester, from the southwest

- Location in Cheshire
- OS grid reference: SJ 406,661
- Location: Corner of Bridge Street and Pepper Street, Chester
- Country: England
- Denomination: Anglican

History
- Status: Redundant
- Dedication: Saint Michael

Architecture
- Functional status: Heritage centre
- Heritage designation: Grade II
- Designated: 28 July 1955
- Architect: James Harrison
- Architectural type: Church
- Style: Gothic, Gothic Revival
- Closed: 1972

Specifications
- Materials: Yellow sandstone, Grey slate roof

St Michael's Church is a redundant church standing on the corner of Bridge Street and Pepper Street in the city of Chester, Cheshire, England. It is recorded in the National Heritage List for England as a designated Grade II listed building. The former church was previously used as a heritage centre, until March 2019, when it opened as Chester: A Life Story, a historical attraction tracing the life of Chester and its inhabitants over the last two thousand years. It was then reopened in 2021 as Sick To Death, a historical attraction depicting the journey of medicine through the ages.

== History ==
A church on the site was burnt down in the great fire of Chester in 1188. It is not known when a stone church was first built but the chancel was built in 1496. The churchwardens' accounts show that the church was almost completely rebuilt in 1582. During the Siege of Chester in the 1640s the church was used as a prison. In 1678 the chancel was widened and in 1710 a steeple 70 feet (21 m) high was built. Much of the church was rebuilt by James Harrison in 1849–50. It was declared redundant in 1972. It was acquired by Chester City Council and in 1975 opened as Britain's first heritage centre. Its parish registers from 1560 have survived.

== Architecture ==
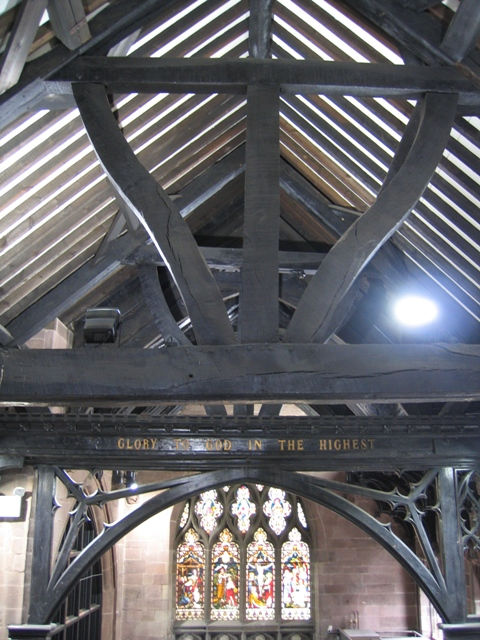
Roof structure

The church is built in yellow sandstone with a grey slate roof. Its plan consists of a west tower, a nave with a north aisle, and a chancel. The tower is in three stages. The south end of Bridge Street Row passes through the open first stage of the tower, with stone steps up to the row to the north and down to the pavement to the south. The second stage has two-light windows with a clock face on the west side and a blank clock-face panel to the south. The third stage has bell openings, above which is a string course with gargoyles. On the top is a crenellated parapet with eight crocketed pinnacles and a wind vane. The south wall is also crenellated. On the chancel gable is a finial cross. Internally the 15th-century north arcade with octagonal piers, and the chancel roof of 1496, have been retained. In the church is a monument to Roger Comberbach, who died in 1771, by Benjamin Bromfield. The stained glass in the window at the east end of the north aisle is by Clayton and Bell.

== See also ==
- Grade II listed buildings in Chester (central)
- List of works by James Harrison
