= Redundant church =

Church building that is no longer used for Christian worship

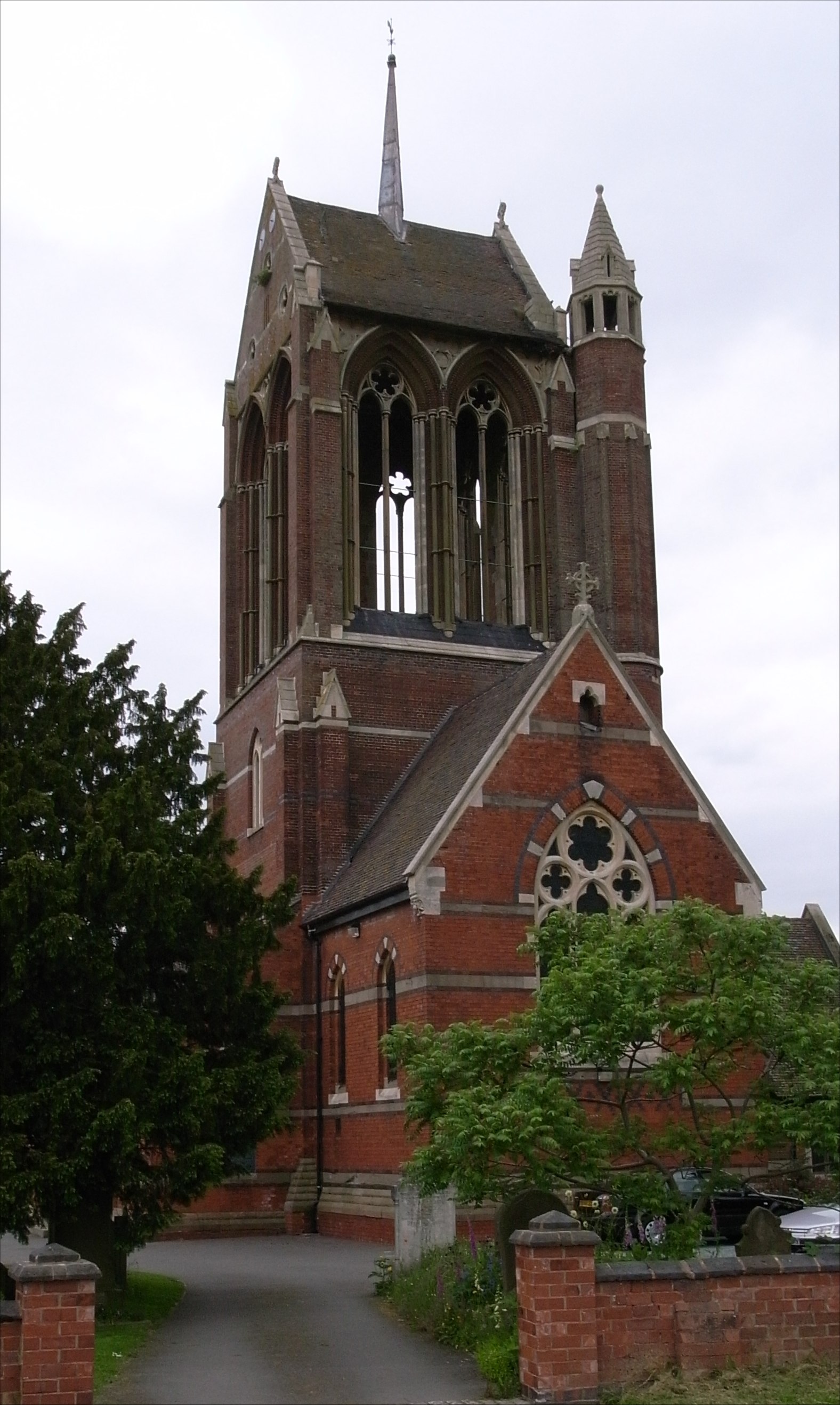
St Mary's in Wythall, Worcestershire, a redundant church, now offices for an electrical company.

A redundant church, now referred to as a closed church, is a church building that is no longer used for Christian worship. The term most frequently refers to former Anglican churches in the United Kingdom, but may also be used for disused churches in other countries. Redundant churches may be deconsecrated, but this is not always done.

Reasons for redundancy include population movements, changing social patterns, merging of parishes, and decline in church attendance (especially in the Global North). Historically, redundant churches were often demolished or left to ruin. Today, many are repurposed as community centres, museums or homes, or are protected under the care of heritage preservation organisations such as Friends of Friendless Churches or the Churches Conservation Trust, and are demolished only if no alternative can be found.

== Anglican buildings ==
Although church buildings fall into disuse around the world, the term "redundancy" was particularly used by the Church of England, which had a Redundant Churches Division. As of 2008, it instead refers to such churches as "closed for regular public worship", and the Redundant Churches Division became the Closed Churches Division.

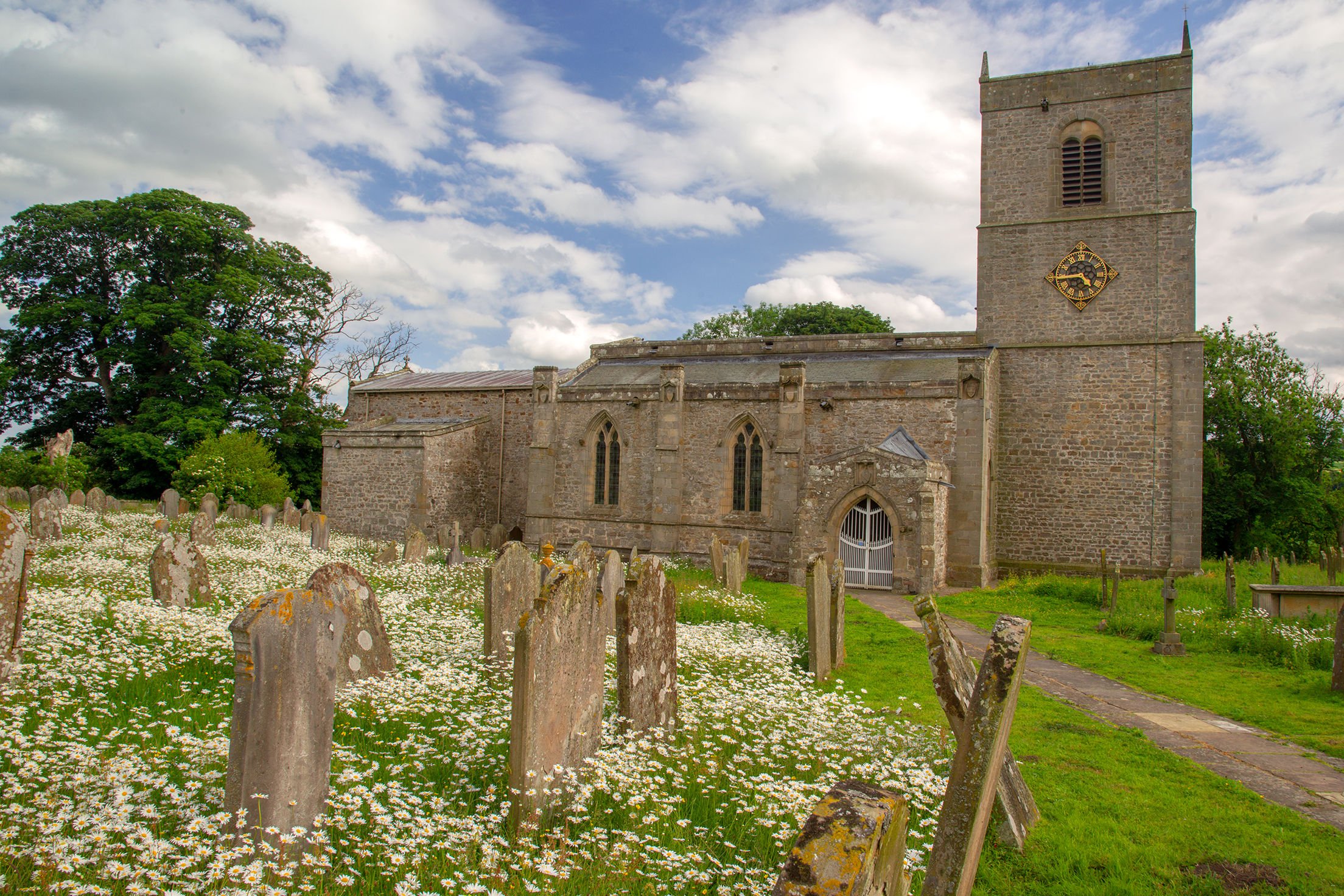
The redundant Holy Trinity Church, Wensley, in North Yorkshire, England, has been vested in the Churches Conservation Trust since 2006.

Church buildings in England may be declared redundant for a number of reasons, but it is primarily due to a reduction in the number of regular Sunday worshippers, which has steadily fallen since the late 1980s, to about 1.7m in 2008, and 1.11m in 2019 (before the COVID-19 pandemic in the UK distorted figures). Other reasons include the amalgamation of parishes; or a preference for another building where two churches are in close proximity, for example at Swaffham Prior, Cambridgeshire. Population shift is another factor. For example, many redundant churches were formerly maintained in deserted or shrunken medieval villages (such as Wharram Percy in Yorkshire). Others are located in town centres that have seen a decline in the resident population. The square mile City of London has only a few thousand permanent residents—far smaller than its historic population, as most workers now commute from outside its boundaries—leaving many redundant churches there.

About 20 to 25 Church of England churches are declared closed for regular public worship each year. They are demolished only as a last resort. Some active use is made of about half of the closed churches. 1795 were closed between 1969 and 2010, or about 11% of existing churches, with about 1/3 listed as Grade I or II. (Of these, only 514 were built later than 1989.) Only 20% were demolished, of which 75% were unlisted.

The aim of the closure process is to find new uses for the structures, for which the diocese is responsible. Some closed churches remain consecrated for occasional use by the Church of England. Some are purchased by other denominations or faiths for regular use. Several charitable trusts preserve churches of architectural merit, such as the Churches Conservation Trust in England, and the Friends of Friendless Churches, which cares for over 70 redundant churches throughout England and Wales. Historic Churches Scotland cares for several former Church of Scotland church buildings.

=== Reuse ===
Depending on their listed status, many closed churches can be converted to other uses. Several are used as community and education centres—for example, All Saints' Church, Bristol and All Saints Church, Harthill. In Chester, Holy Trinity Church now serves as the town's Guildhall, and St Michael's Church as a heritage centre. St Peter's Church, Offord D'Arcy, managed by the Churches Conservation Trust, is used to host festivals, including a film festival.

Others buildings are used in more unusual ways. Old St Ann's Church, Warrington is an indoor climbing centre (one of several churches used in this way). Others are art galleries, coffee shops, and even pubs and clubs (e.g. High Pavement Chapel in Nottingham). Many are converted into residential properties.

In some cases—such as the grade-I-listed St Ninian's, Brougham, a Churches Conservation Trust church—the building's remote location makes alternative use impractical.

== Methodist buildings ==
The popularity of Methodism and other non-conformist churches in the 19th century has left many chapel buildings which cannot be sustained. At their height, various Methodist factions ran about 14,000 chapels in the UK. With declining attendance, in 2002 the United Methodists owned just over 6,000, and disposed of about 100 each year. Particularly significant chapels may have been taken into the care of the Historic Chapels Trust which has since dissolved and its buildings redistributed.
