= All Saints Church, Handley =

Coordinates: 53.1154°N 2.7989°W

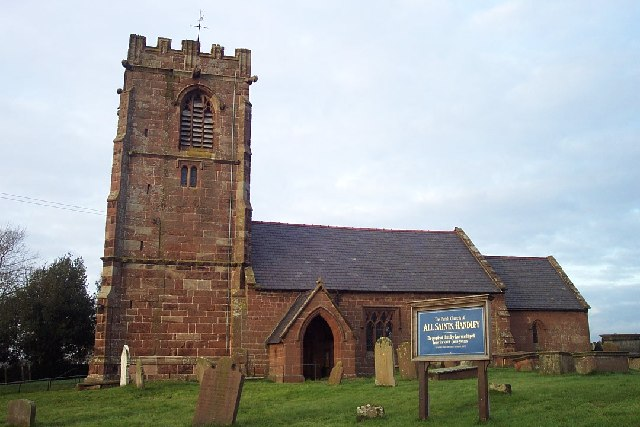
- All Saints Church, Handley, from the south

- Location in Cheshire
- OS grid reference: SJ 466,579
- Location: Handley, Cheshire
- Country: England
- Denomination: Anglican
- Website: All Saints, Handley

History
- Status: Parish church

Architecture
- Functional status: Active
- Heritage designation: Grade II*
- Designated: 1 March 1967
- Architect: James Harrison
- Architectural type: Church
- Style: Gothic, Gothic Revival
- Completed: 1891

Specifications
- Materials: Red sandstone, Welsh slate roof

Administration
- Province: York
- Diocese: Chester
- Archdeaconry: Chester
- Deanery: Malpas
- Parish: Handley

Clergy
- Rector: Rev Canon Lameck Mutete

All Saints Church stands to the north of the village of Handley, Cheshire, England. It is recorded in the National Heritage List for England as a designated Grade II* listed building. The church is an active Anglican parish church in the diocese of Chester, the archdeaconry of Chester and the deanery of Malpas. Its benefice is combined with that of St Alban, Tattenhall.

== History ==
There has been a church on this site from the 12th century. In a restoration in 1854 by James Harrison all the masonry was removed except for the west tower which had been built in 1512. During the restoration a Norman doorway on the north side of the church was lost, but the hammerbeam roof dated 1661 was retained. A chancel and vestry were added in 1891.

== Architecture ==
=== Exterior ===
The church is built in ashlar red sandstone with a Welsh slate roof. Its plan consists of west tower, a three-bay nave, a one-bay chancel, a vestry, and a south porch. The tower has three stages and corner buttresses. An inscription on its south wall records its building in 1512. It has a west door above which is a three-light window with empty niches on each side. The belfry windows have three lights, the top of the tower is embattled, it has gargoyles, and the string course includes carved heads.

=== Interior ===
The nave has a hammerbeam roof with "excellent scrolled carved corbels". On the north side of the church is a stained glass window by William Wailes. The 17th-century font is octagonal in red sandstone and the parish chest is dated 1677. There is a ring of six bells, the oldest three dating from around 1512, from 1615 and from 1682. A bell from 1709 was cast by Rudhall of Gloucester and the remaining two bells were cast in 1906 by John Taylor and Company. The parish registers begin in 1570 and the churchwardens' accounts in 1710.

== See also ==
- Listed buildings in Handley, Cheshire
- List of works by James Harrison
