= Listed buildings in Tattenhall =

Tattenhall is a former civil parish, now in the parish of Tattenhall and District, in Cheshire West and Chester, England. It contains 27 buildings that are recorded in the National Heritage List for England as designated listed buildings. Of these, three are listed at Grade II*, the middle grade, and the others are at Grade II, the lowest grade. Apart from the village of Tattenhall, the parish is rural. In the village the listed buildings include the church and its sundial, the war memorial, and houses and cottages, some dating from the 17th century and with a timber-framed core. Outside the village, the listed buildings include country houses and associated structures, other houses and cottages, farmhouses, and a boundary stone.

== Key ==
Grade	Criteria
II*	Particularly important buildings of more than special interest
II	Buildings of national importance and special interest

== Buildings ==
Name and location	Photograph	Date	Notes	Grade
St Alban's Church; 53.1222°N 2.7688°W		Early 16th century	The earliest parts of the church are its core and the tower. In 1869–70 John Douglas carried out a major restoration. The church is built in red sandstone with a green slate roof, and consists of a nave with aisles, a chancel, an embattled west tower, and a timber-framed south porch.	II*
Woodlake House; 53.11139°N 2.76578°W	—	Mid 16th century	This originated as a Tudor house, later used as a house. It was remodelled in 1683, and further alterations were made in the 20th century. The house is built in rendered brick with stone dressings and a Welsh slate roof. It has an L-shaped plan with a porch in the angle, it is in two and three storeys, and has a three-bay front, the central bay projecting forward under a gable. The windows are casements. Inside the house is an inglenook.	II*
Rock Bank and Rock Cottage; 53.12065°N 2.76858°W	—	1601	Originating as a farmhouse, this was later converted into a house and a shop. Alterations were carried out in the 19th and 20th centuries. The front of the building is timber-framed with brick nogging, the sides and back are in rendered brick, and the roof is in Welsh slate. It is in two storeys, and has a four-bay front. The windows are casements.	II
Tattenhall Hall; 53.11852°N 2.76895°W	—	c. 1610	A country house in Jacobean style, it is built in brick on a stone plinth, with sandstone dressings and a Welsh slate roof. The interior was altered in 1858. It has an irregular H-shaped plan, is in two and three storeys, and has a five-bay entrance front. There are two gables that are similar in style but different in height. The windows are mullioned and transomed.	II*
Bank and house, Church Bank; 53.12124°N 2.76877°W	—	17th century	This originated as a farmhouse, later converted into a house and bank. The building is timber-framed with brick nogging on a stone plinth with a Welsh slate roof. It has a rectangular plan with a cross-wing on the left. The building is in 1 1/2 storeys, and has a five-bay front. The windows are 20th-century casements, the upper ones in gabled dormers with shaped bargeboards.	II
Hawthorn Cottage; 53.11778°N 2.74847°W	—	17th century	A cottage with a shippon added in the following century. It is mainly timber-framed with brick nogging, some brick repairs, and one bay in sandstone. The cottage is in 1 1/2 storeys and has a four-bay front. The windows are casements, the upper ones in half-dormers. The sandstone bay has been painted to give the appearance of timber-framing.	II
Ivy Cottage; 53.12558°N 2.72517°W	—	17th century	The cottage was reconstructed in 1983. It is timber-framed on a sandstone plinth. and has a thatched roof. It is in a single storey and has a front of three bays. The windows are casements. At both ends are small lean-to extensions.	II
Greenbank; 53.11629°N 2.77199°W	—	Mid to late 17th century	A cottage that was extended in the 19th century by the addition of a rear wing. It is a timber-framed building with brick nogging, partly rendered and painted to resemble timber-framing. The south gable wall has been rebuilt in brick and rendered, and the roof is slated. The cottage is in 1 1/2 storeys and has a three-bay front. There is a central porch, two square windows on the ground floor, and three gables dormers above.	II
Sundial; 53.12205°N 2.76871°W		18th century	The sundial is in the churchyard of St Alban's Church. It is in buff sandstone and consists of a fluted baluster standing on three square steps, having a base decorated with acanthus leaves and an egg-and-dart frieze. On the top is a square cap with a square plaque inscribed with the date 1822, and the names of churchwardens.	II
Boundary stone 53.10586°N 2.75171°W	—	Late 18th century	The boundary stone is a rectangular red sandstone block set into the roadside wall. It is carved with a vertical line, to the left of which is the inscribed initial "B" (for Broxton), and to the right "T" (for Tattenhall).	II
Henhull Cottage; 53.11411°N 2.74286°W	—	Late 18th century	This originated as a house, was then used as a wheelwright's cottage and a stable, then converted again for use as a house. It is in brick on a sandstone plinth, with a Welsh slate roof. The house is in two storeys, the southeast face having a four-bay front. To the right of the front are small-paned windows, and to the left ventilation holes. The northwest front has nine bays, and contains two square pitch holes.	II
Laurel Bank; 53.11923°N 2.77099°W	—	Late 18th century	A farmhouse, later a house, it was altered in the 19th century. The house is in brick on a stone plinth with rusticated quoins and a Welsh slate roof. It is in two storeys and has a four-bay front. At the top is a dentilated cornice and coped gables. The windows are sashes, and over the door is an architrave containing a fanlight.	II
Medway House; 53.12125°N 2.76829°W	—	Early 19th century	A brick house on a plastered plinth with a Welsh slate roof. It is in two storeys, and has a symmetrical three-bay front. In the lateral bays are sash windows. The central bay contains a doorway under a semicircular head.	II
St Albans and St Albans House; 53.12158°N 2.76895°W	—	Early 19th century	A pair of brick houses with a Welsh slate roof. They have a rectangular plan, are in two storeys, and have a six-bay front. The windows are sashes under stone wedged heads; in the right end bay is a canted bay window. The doors have wooden architraves, and the right house has a trelliswork porch.	II
Offices, High Street; 53.12044°N 2.76870°W	—	Early 19th century	A house, later converted into offices, it is in stuccoed brick on a stone plinth with a hipped Welsh slate roof. The building has a double-pile plan, is in three storeys, and has a symmetrical three-bay front. The windows are sashes. In the centre is a detached Ionic porch with unfluted columns leading to a doorway with a fanlight above it.	II
The Cottage and Conifers; 53.12138°N 2.76888°W	—	Early 19th century	A brick house and cottage with a Welsh slate roof. The building has a rectangular plan, with two storeys, the house having three bays and the cottage two. At the top is a dentilated cornice. The windows are sashes.	II
Olympus House; 53.12088°N 2.76814°W	—	Early to mid 19th century	A stuccoed brick house on a stone plinth with stone dressings and a Welsh slate roof. It is in three storeys, and has a four-bay front. On the corners are rusticated quoins. The windows are sashes. In the second bay is a detached Doric porch with unfluted columns. Four steps lead up to a doorway with a rectangular fanlight.	II
Claremont; 53.12175°N 2.76489°W	—	c. 1840	A brick house with a hipped Welsh slate roof. It has a double-pile plan, is in two storeys, and has a symmetrical three-bay front, the centre bay being slightly set back. The windows are sashes, those in the ground floor having semicircular heads, those in the upper floor with flat heads, In the centre is a porch with plain pilasters leading by three steps up to the entrance.	II
Greengates; 53.12181°N 2.76518°W	—	c. 1840	A brick house with stone dressings and a stone-slate roof. It has a double-pile plan, is in two storeys, and has a symmetrical three-bay front, the lateral bays projecting slightly forward. The windows are all sashes, those in the ground floor under semicircular heads, and those above with flat heads. In the centre is a Doric porch with half-fluted columns. Above the door is a fanlight.	II
The Mount; 53.12080°N 2.76835°W	—	c. 1850	A house in stuccoed brick with a Welsh slate roof. It has a square plan, is in three storeys, and has a symmetrical three-bay front. At the corners are pilasters, and across the front of the house is a wooden verandah. The central bay contains a doorway with a semicircular head and a fanlight, and at the top of the bay is a simple triangular pediment.	II
Gate piers, walls and railings, Tattenhall Lodge; 53.10662°N 2.75320°W	—	Mid 19th century	The gate piers and attached walls and railings were built for the Bolesworth estate. The piers and walls are in sandstone, the gates are in wrought iron. The piers flank the entrance, and there are intermittent piers along the walls, which are curved. The piers are castellated, and the railings are decorative with clustered-leaf finials.	II
Gate piers and wing walls, Tattenhall Hall; 53.11824°N 2.76930°W	—	1858 (probable)	The gate piers and wing walls stand at the entrance to the grounds of the hall, and were designed by Thomas Harrison. They are in red sandstone and have a Greek cross plan. The piers are plain and stand on moulded plinths, and have moulded caps with ball finials. The wing walls are curved and have triangular and beaded coping.	II
Haybarn; 53.11792°N 2.76848°W	—	1859–60	The haybarn was part of a model farm for Tattenhall Hall designed by Thomas Harrison. It is in brick with a roof partly in Welsh slate and partly in corrugated asbestos. It has a long seven-bay front, the central bay projecting to the south. Along the front is an arcade of seven semicircular-headed arches, and there are similar arches on the gabled sides of the haybarn and on the projection.	II
The Rookery; 53.1236°N 2.7706°W	—	1909	A country house rebuilt on the site of an earlier house, it is timber-framed on a stone plinth, incorporating some brick at the rear, and has a stone-slate roof. It was built for F. W. Wignall of the Tate & Lyle company. It is in two and three storeys, the upper storeys being jettied. Other features include Tudor-style chimney stacks, and a large two-storey gable. The windows are mullioned and transomed.	II
War Memorial; 53.11971°N 2.76936°W	—	1922	The war memorial is in sandstone and consists of a Celtic cross on a tapered shaft. This stands on deep plinth on a stepped base. There are two plates containing the names of those lost in the wars.	II
Rose Corner; 53.11885°N 2.77306°W	—	1927	A pair of partly stuccoed brick cottages with a hipped green slate roof. They were designed by Clough Williams-Ellis in Neo-Palladian style. They have a rectangular plan, are in one and two storeys, and have a symmetrical seven-bay front. In the centre three bays is a four-column portico with a pediment. The windows are sashes. The outer bays have one storey and end in pilasters with urn finials.	II
