= Golborne Bellow =

Former civil parish in Cheshire, England

Coordinates: 53.124°N 2.789°W

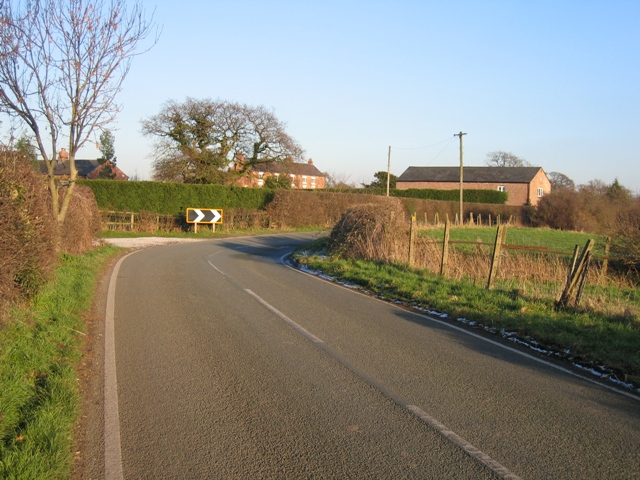
- Russia Hall

- Location within Cheshire
- Population: 89 (2001)
- OS grid reference: SJ473588
- Civil parish: Tattenhall and District
- Unitary authority: Cheshire West and Chester
- Ceremonial county: Cheshire
- Region: North West
- Country: England
- Sovereign state: United Kingdom
- Post town: CHESTER
- Postcode district: CH3
- Dialling code: 01829
- Police: Cheshire
- Fire: Cheshire
- Ambulance: North West
- UK Parliament: Chester South and Eddisbury

Golborne Bellow is a former civil parish, now in the parish of Tattenhall and District, in the Cheshire West and Chester district, and ceremonial county of Cheshire in England. In 2001 it had a population of 89. The parish included part of the village of Gatesheath. Golborne-Bellow was formerly a township in the parish of Tattenhall, in 1866 Golborne Bellow became a separate civil parish, on 1 April 2015 the parish was abolished to form Tattenhall and District.

== See also ==
- Listed buildings in Golborne Bellow
