= Listed buildings in Broxton, Cheshire =

Broxton is a civil parish in Cheshire West and Chester, England. It contains 24 buildings that are recorded in the National Heritage List for England as designated listed buildings, The parish includes the Bolesworth Estate, and the settlement of Brown Knowl, and is otherwise rural. The major structure, and the only one listed at Grade II* is the castellated country house, Bolesworth Castle. All the others are listed at Grade II. These include nine structures associated with Bolesworth Caste, the church in Brown Knowl with a tomb in its churchyard, and an 18th-century milestone. Otherwise the listed buildings are related to houses or farms.

== Key ==
Grade	Criteria
Grade II*	Particularly important buildings of more than special interest.
Grade II	Buildings of national importance and special interest.

== Buildings ==
Name and location	Photograph	Date	Notes	Grade
Broxton Old Hall; 53.0743°N 2.7671°W		1595	The hall was originally built for Thomas Dod, and was extended in 1873, incorporating fabric from the older house, by John Douglas for Sir Philip de Grey Egerton. Further changes were made in 1987–88. The house is timber-framed with plaster panels. The roof is in stone slate, with ornate bargeboards and finials. The house has two storeys, and windows that are mullioned, or mullioned and transomed.	II
Bay Bush; 53.0765°N 2.7536°W	—	17th century	The house originated as a sandstone farmhouse in two bays, with a shippon on the left, both in 1 1/2 storeys. In the late 20th century another bay was added to the right, and the shippon was raised to two storeys. The house has a slate roof, and the windows are casements and gabled dormers.	II
Bellevue Villa; 53.0880°N 2.7690°W	—	17th century	This originated as a two-storey, two bay cottage. This part is timber-framed with rendered brick panels. During the 20th century a single brick bay was added to each end. The roofs are slated. Inside is a restored inglenook with a chamfered bressumer.	II
Broxton Lower Hall; 53.0827°N 2.7765°W	—	1671	The hall was restored and altered in 1886. The original part is timber-framed with plaster panels on a sandstone plinth. The later parts are in brick, and the building has slate roofs. It is in 2 1/2 storeys, and has an almost symmetrical front. There are four gables with bargeboards and finials. The windows are either mullioned, or mullioned and transomed. It was later used as a hotel.	II
Halfway House milestone 53.09021°N 2.76912°W		1761	A large piece of sandstone inscribed with the date, and that it marks the midpoint between Chester and Whitchurch, each being ten miles distant.	II
Barn House; 53.0842°N 2.7652°W	—	Late 18th century	This Georgian house is constructed in brick on a sandstone plinth, all of which is painted white, and has a hipped slate roof. It is in 2 1/2 storeys, with a three-bay front. In the centre is an Ionic portico with a flat entablature. On each side is a canted bay with sash windows, above which is a gabled dormer with a casement window.	II
Stone parlour, Broxton Old Hall; 53.07328°N 2.77014°W	—	Early 19th century or before	This consists of a chamber in the grounds of the hall cut into a sandstone cliff. It is partly lined with sandstone blocks, and formerly had a large window and a doorway. To its right is a natural cave.	II
Barn and shippon, Barnhill Grange; 53.0908°N 2.7692°W	—	Early 19th century	This is a rectangular brick building in two storeys with a slate roof. It contains recesses and openings of various sizes, doors, and pitch holes, some of which are boarded. There are vents with different shapes, including diamonds and loops, and honeycomb brickwork.	II
Bolesworth Castle; 53.0986°N 2.7556°W	—	1829	This is a castellated country house, designed by William Cole. The interior was partly remodelled and structures in the grounds were created by Clough Williams-Ellis in 1920–23. It is constructed in sandstone, and is in two storeys, with a three-storey turretted centre portion.	II*
Gate piers, Bolesworth Castle; 53.09800°N 2.75768°W	—	1829	A pair of sandstone gate piers to the southwest of the castle, designed by William Cole. On each face are blank arrow slits, and at the tops are a projecting frieze, a cyma cornice, and a stone ball.	II
Gates and walls, Bolesworth Castle; 53.10200°N 2.75237°W	—	After 1829	These consist of two pairs of sandstone gate piers linked by walls, containing wrought iron gates from a later time in the 19th century, standing to the northeast of the castle. The pair to the east, flanking the drive, are surmounted by balls; the pair to the west, leading to parkland and the lake are not.	II
Bridge over lake, Bolesworth Castle; 53.10262°N 2.75307°W	—	c. 1830	A sandstone single-arched bridge carrying a track across the lake in the grounds of the castle. The arch is flanked by pilaster buttresses that contain roundels in the spandrels. The approach to the bridge is between curved wing walls, and its flat parapet is pierced by 14 loops.	II
Lower Terrace, Bolesworth Castle; 53.09893°N 2.75630°W	—	c. 1830	The wall to the lower terrace was designed by William Cole. It is in sandstone, and has a battlemented parapet with merlons, and four round bastions.	II
The Villa; 53.0828°N 2.7521°W	—	c. 1830	This is a simple two-storey house three-bay house. It is constructed in white-painted brick with a slate gabled roof. It has a wooden Doric-style doorcase with a pediment. The windows are sashes.	II
Boathouse, Bolesworth Castle; 53.09811°N 2.76059°W	—	Mid 19th century	Constructed in sandstone, the boathouse has a Tudor-arched entrance flanked by buttresses. At the top is an embattled parapet between turrets.	II
Bankhead; 53.0862°N 2.7661°W	—	1864	Designed by Alfred Waterhouse as a dower house for the Bolesworth estate, it is constructed in brick with sandstone dressings, and has tiled roofs. The plan is irregular. Its features include hipped gables containing ornate circular windows. There is a gabled porch, to the right of which is a square bay window; over this is a smaller canted bay window.	II
Stable and coach house, Bankhead; 53.0865°N 2.7657°W	—	1864	The L-shaped building was designed by Alfred Waterhouse for the Bolesworth estate. It is a brick building in a single storey, with haylofts, hipped gables, and a hipped dormer. Other features include a clock, a weathervane, carriage doorways, and hopper windows.	II
Tomb, Brown Knowl Methodist Churchyard; 53.07676°N 2.75415°W	—	c. 1869	This consists of a pier standing on a plinth and a sandstone base, with a cast iron crest. It is the burial place of John Wedgwood who died in 1860 and his wife; Wedgwood was a preacher in the Primitive Methodist church.	II
Lodge, Broxton Old Hall; 53.0745°N 2.7655°W		1873	The single-storey lodge was designed by John Douglas, and is timber-framed on a brick plinth with stone slate roofs. It has a cruciform plan, and is in Jacobean style. Its features include two canted bay windows, a shaped chimney, mullioned windows, and gables with ornate timber-framing, bargeboards and finials.	II
Brown Knowl Methodist Church and Sunday School; 53.0769°N 2.7547°W		1913	The Sunday School is attached at right angles to the church, forming an L-plan, with a tower and a vestry in the angle. They are built in brick with stone dressings and bands, and have slate roofs. The gables of the church are pebbledashed. A five-light window faces the road. The tower has traceried panels rather than bell openings.	II
Temple, Bolesworth Castle; 53.09778°N 2.75659°W	—	1920–23	Designed by Clough Williams-Ellis, this is an octagonal sandstone structure with a copper dome. Its design is based on the Tower of the Winds at Athens. Inside the temple is a statue of Diana with a hound.	II
Middle Terrace, Bolesworth Castle; 53.09901°N 2.75589°W	—	1920–23 (probable)	The terrace walls and steps leading down to the lower terrace were designed by Clough Williams-Ellis. The steps are curved and divided, and pass round the sides of a loggia and under an arch.	II
Shelter, Bolesworth Castle; 53.09851°N 2.75623°W	—	1920–23 (probable)	This is an open shelter sited at the south end of the upper terrace in front of the castle. It was designed by Clough Williams-Ellis, and consists of a semicircular sandstone wall with square balusters, containing a semicircular stone seat.	II
Upper Terrace, Bolesworth Castle; 53.09884°N 2.75596°W	—	1920–23 (probable)	The terrace walls and steps leading down to the middle terrace were designed by Clough Williams-Ellis. The steps form a broad central single flight. On the corners of the walls are urns.	II
