= Tattenhall Hall =

Country house in Tattenhall, Cheshire, England

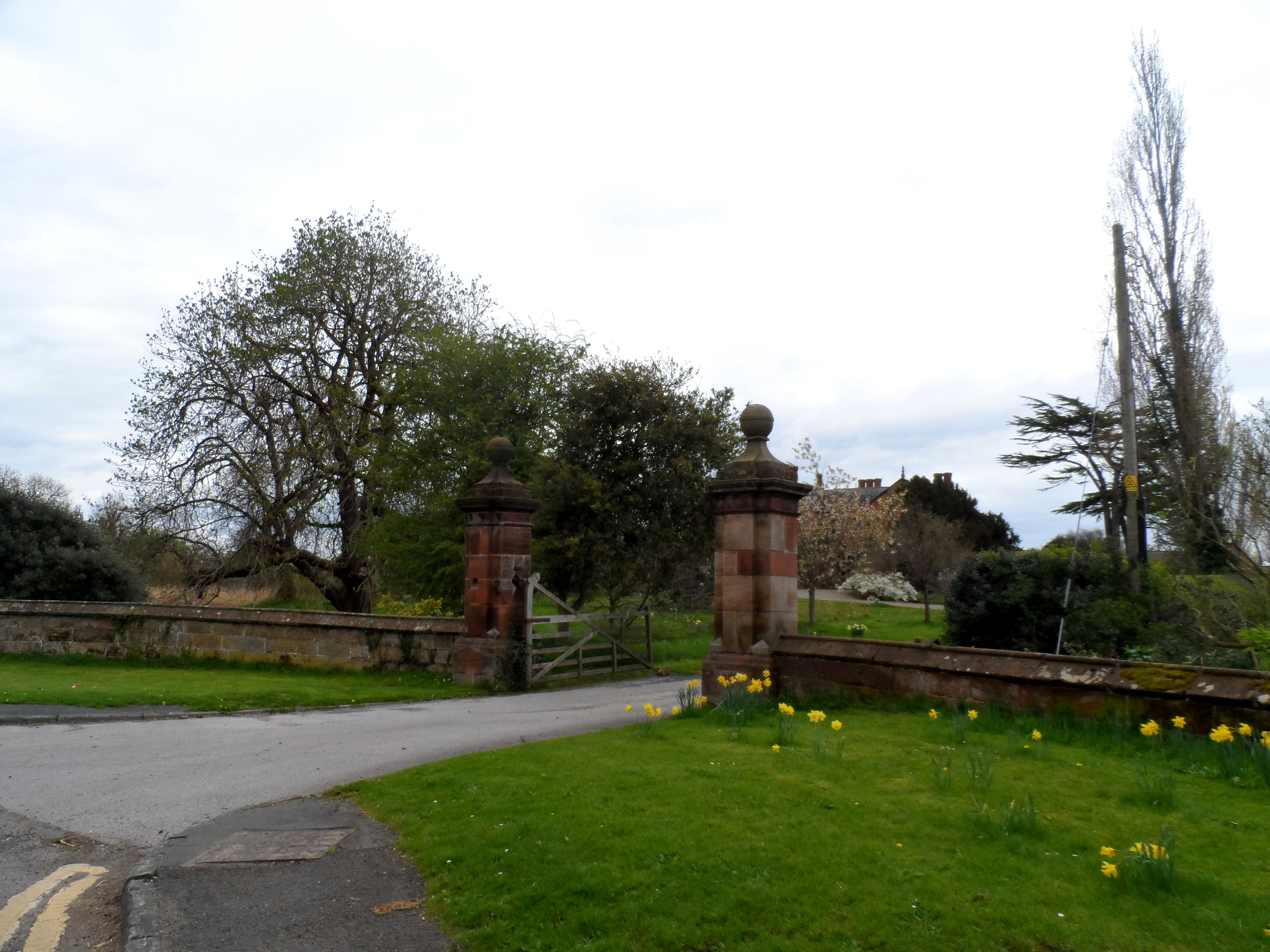
- Interactive map of Tattenhall Hall
- 53°07′07″N 2°46′08″W
- Location: Tattenhall, Cheshire, England

History
- Built: Early 17th century (before 1622)
- Built for: Sir Richard Bostock

Site notes
- Architectural style: Jacobean

Listed Building – Grade II*
- Official name: Tattenhall Hall
- Reference no.: 1230476

Tattenhall Hall is a country house standing to the south of the village of Tattenhall, Cheshire, England. The house is designated by English Heritage as a Grade II* listed building.

The house was built in the early part of the 17th century, before 1622, for Sir Richard Bostock. Sir J Bradshaw of Chester owned the house by 1666 and it later became a farmhouse.

The house was bought in 1856 by Robert Barbour who restored the house and commissioned Thomas Harrison to design gate piers and farm buildings. In the early 20th century the owners were the Cooke family. In 1994 the house, along with 4.5 acres (1.8 ha) of land, was bought by the Benfields and Jannie Hollins and Chris Evered.

== Architecture ==
The house is constructed in brick with sandstone dressings and a Welsh slate roof, and is an early example of a brick building in Cheshire. The architectural style is Jacobean. It has an irregular H-shaped plan, in two and three storeys, with an entrance front of five bays. It contains two gables that are similar in style, but have difference in heights, suggesting that they were designed separately. Much of the interior of the building is from 1858; however, some of the Jacobean panelled window seats and wainscoting survive.

Associated with the hall are two structures listed at Grade II. The sandstone gate piers and wing walls were built probably in 1858 and designed by Thomas Harrison. The hay barn to the southeast of the hall was built in 1858 and was also designed by Harrison.

Since 1994 the gardens have been laid out and the pond dug out. Taking inspiration from the grounds at Great Dixter wild flower meadows have been created using plants such as Betonica officinalis.

== See also ==
- Listed buildings in Tattenhall
