= Broxton, Cheshire =

Village in Cheshire, England

Coordinates: 53.08333°N 2.77888°W

Broxton
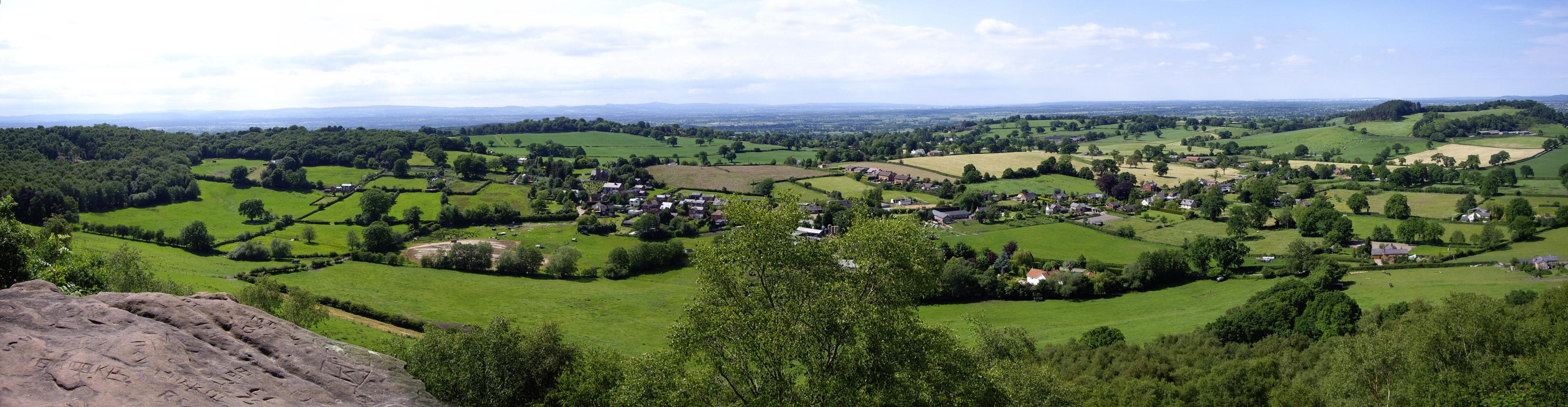
- Broxton from Bickerton Hill

- Location within Cheshire
- Population: 461 (2011)
- OS grid reference: SJ479542
- Civil parish: Broxton
- Unitary authority: Cheshire West and Chester
- Ceremonial county: Cheshire
- Region: North West
- Country: England
- Sovereign state: United Kingdom
- Post town: CHESTER
- Postcode district: CH3
- Dialling code: 01829
- Police: Cheshire
- Fire: Cheshire
- Ambulance: North West
- UK Parliament: Chester South and Eddisbury

Broxton is a village and civil parish in the unitary authority of Cheshire West and Chester and the ceremonial county of Cheshire, England. The village is 11 miles south of Chester, and 10 miles east of Wrexham in Wales. The civil parish also contains the small settlements of Barnhill, Bolesworth, Brown Knowl, Fuller's Moor and Meadow Bank. According to the 2001 Census it had a total population of 390, increasing to 461 at the 2011 census.

== Notable residents ==
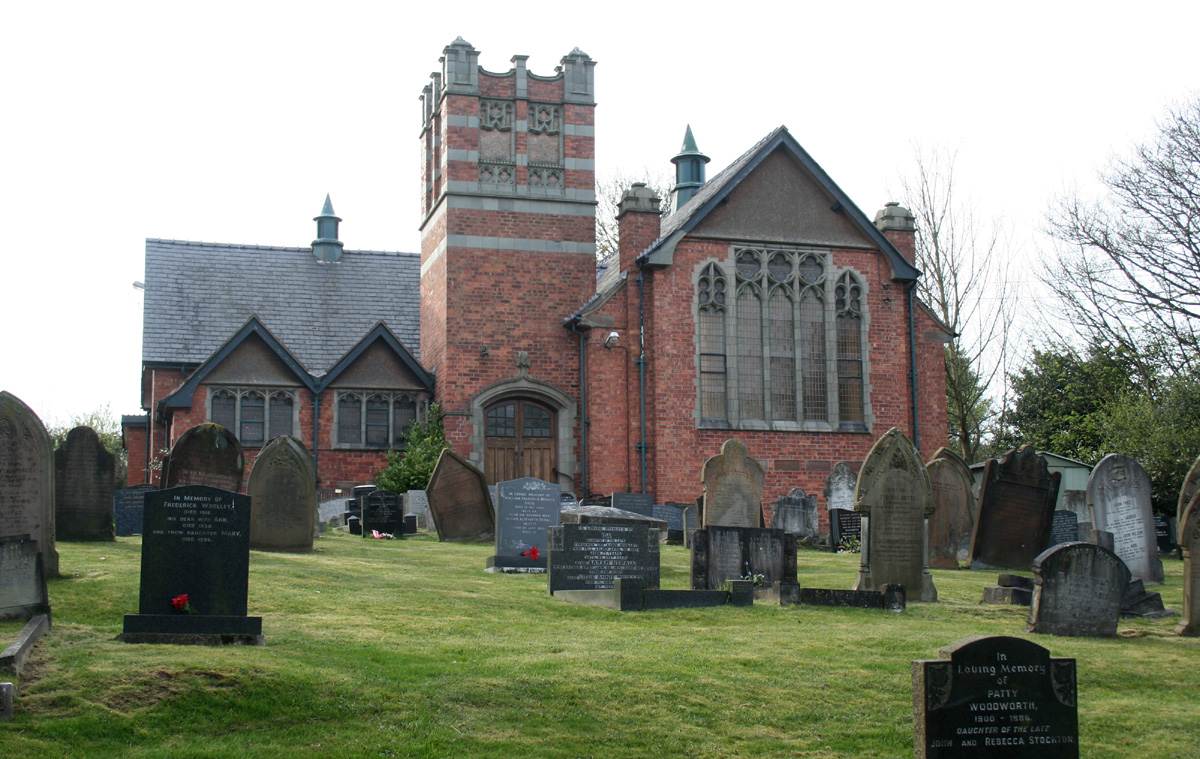
Brown Knowl Methodist Church

- Harry Atkinson, premier of New Zealand on four occasions during the late 19th century was born in Broxton.
- Austin Carr, cricketer, was born at Lower Hall, in Broxton in 1898.
- Roger Moore, actor, lived at Broxton Hall during his marriage to singer Dorothy Squires, which lasted from 1953 to 1968.

== See also ==
- Listed buildings in Broxton, Cheshire
- Broxton Old Hall
