= Bolesworth Castle =

Country house in Cheshire, England

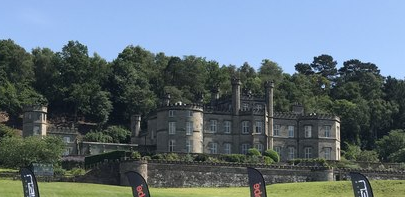
Bolesworth Castle

Bolesworth Castle is a country house 2 miles (3 km) south of the village of Tattenhall, Cheshire, England. It is recorded in the National Heritage List for England as a designated Grade II* listed building.

== History ==
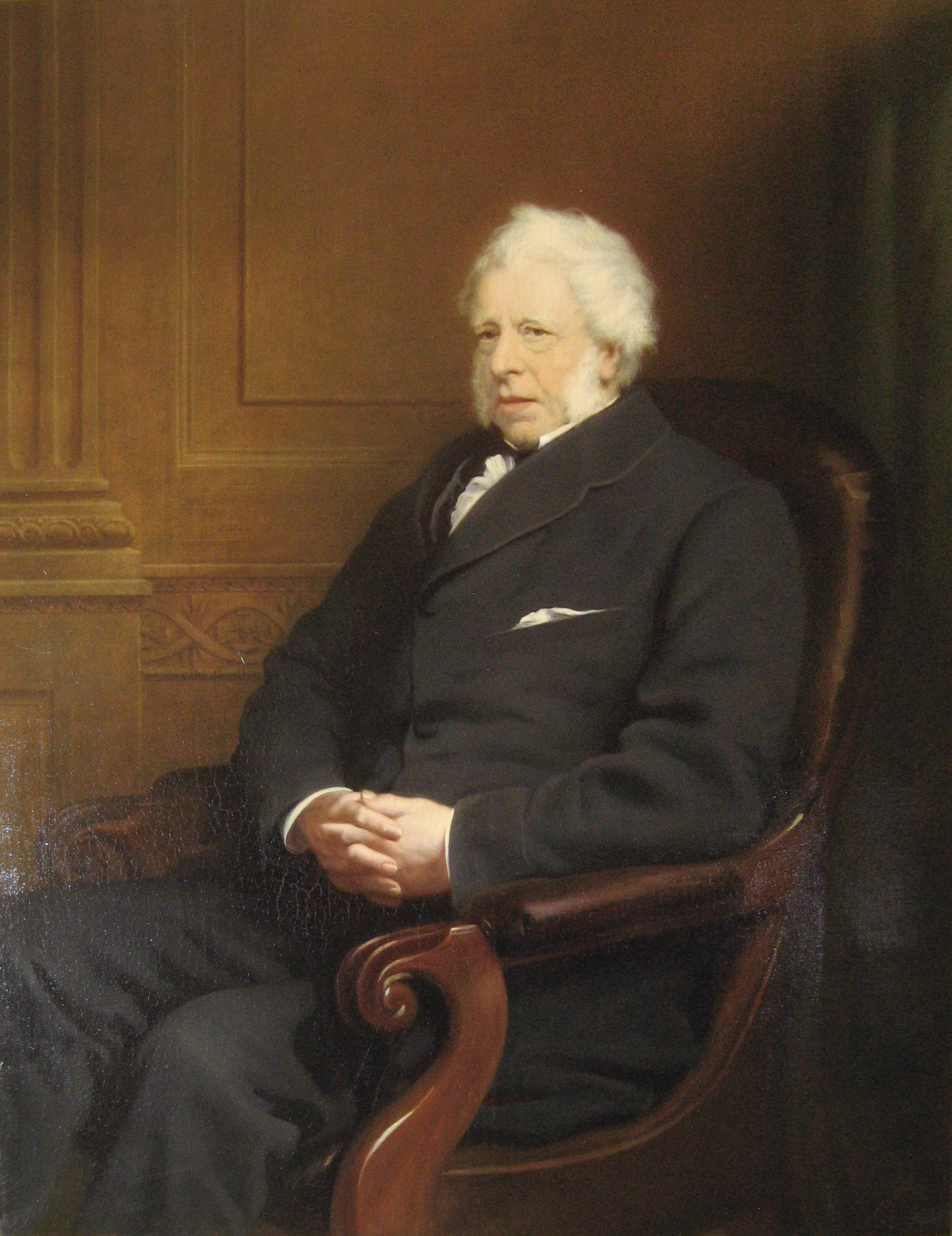
Robert Barbour, who bought Bolesworth Castle in 1856

Bolesworth Castle was built for George Walmesley, a Manchester businessman, to a design by William Cole in 1829, on the site of an older house dating from 1750. In 1856 it was bought by Robert Barbour, a Scottish businessman who founded a cotton textile business in Manchester. It has remained in the Barbour family since. In 1920–23 the castle was partly remodelled by Clough Williams-Ellis.

== Architecture ==
The house is built in ashlar sandstone and is castellated. It is mainly in two storeys with wide canted bays in the centre and on the right, and a wide round bay on the left. At the centre, and recessed, is a three-story tower with turrets.

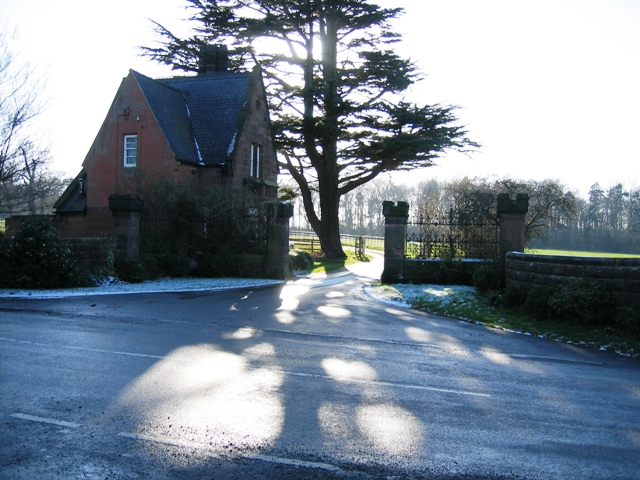
Gates to north drive of Bolesworth Castle

Around the house and in the grounds are a number of structures which are listed Grade II. These are the wall and steps of the upper and middle terraces, the wall of the lower terrace, a temple with a statue of Diana, the park gates, gate piers and wing walls on the north drive, gate piers on the drive from Chowley Lodge, an open shelter, a bridge over the fishpool, and a boat house.

== Recent history and present day ==
The house and estate of 6,000 acres (24 km^{2}) were inherited in 1989 by Anthony Barbour, making him one of the largest landowners in Cheshire. He developed the estate as a centre for small businesses, restoring redundant buildings and modernising its 16 farms, thereby supporting some 800 jobs. Barbour also replanted the garden with over 350 varieties of trees. In 1998 he was awarded the Bledisloe gold medal by the Royal Agricultural Society of England for the work he did on the estate. Barbour died in 2007. Since then the estate has been cared for by his wife, Diana, and by his daughter, Nina, who is the director of the estate.

Today Bolesworth is known for hosting a variety of major equestrian, family and action sports events both on-site and around the country. The Bolesworth International Horse Show takes place each summer, as well as the Al Shira'aa Bolesworth Young Horse Championships, alongside the iconic Christmas at Bolesworth lights trail and many more.

== See also ==
- Grade II* listed buildings in Cheshire West and Chester
- Listed buildings in Broxton, Cheshire
