= Tattenhall =

Village in Cheshire, England

Coordinates: 53.12°N 2.76°W

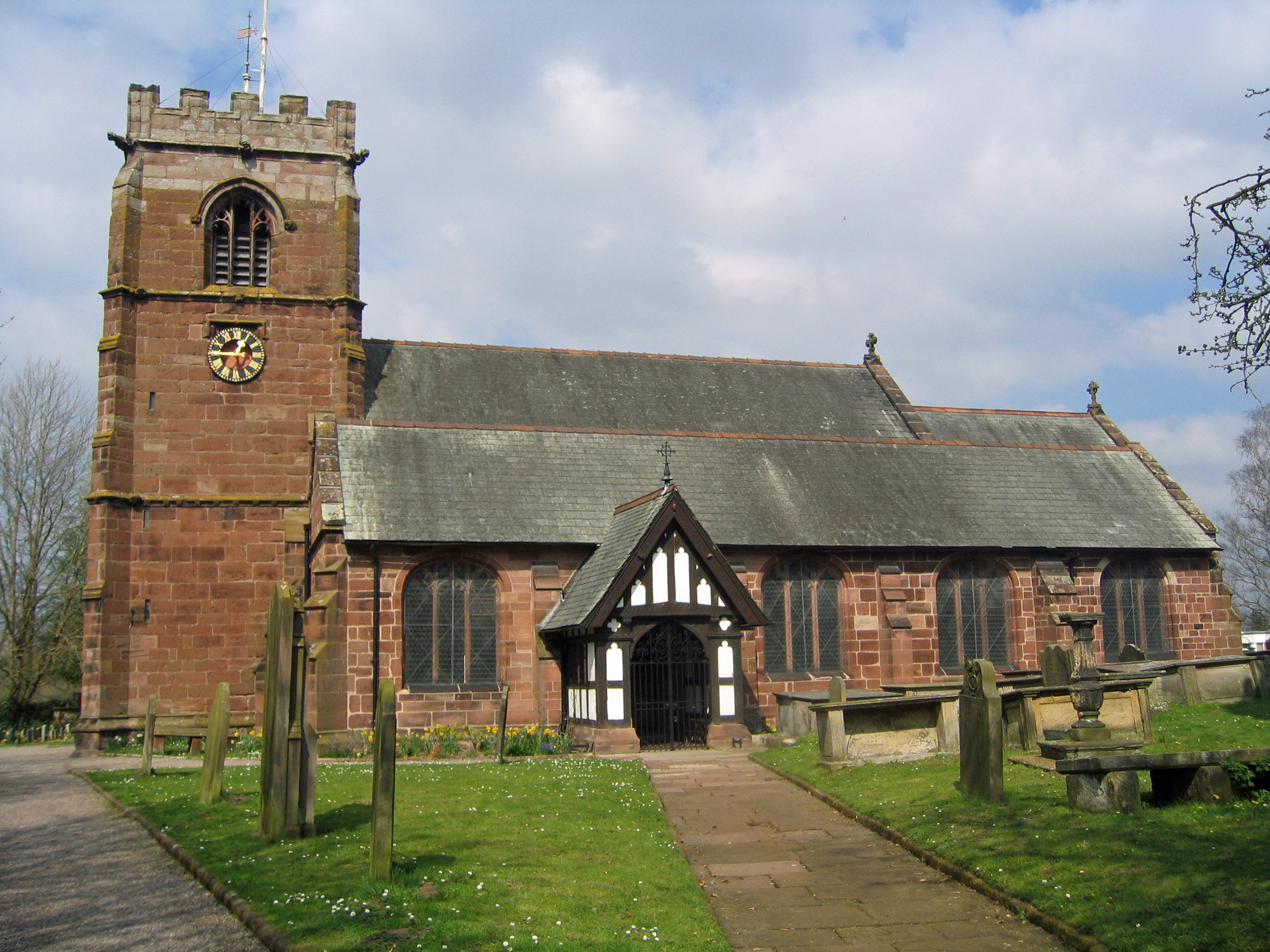
- St Alban's Church

- Location within Cheshire
- Population: 2,079 (2011 census)
- OS grid reference: SJ486585
- Civil parish: Tattenhall and District
- Unitary authority: Cheshire West and Chester
- Ceremonial county: Cheshire
- Region: North West
- Country: England
- Sovereign state: United Kingdom
- Post town: CHESTER
- Postcode district: CH3
- Dialling code: 01829
- Police: Cheshire
- Fire: Cheshire
- Ambulance: North West
- UK Parliament: Chester South and Eddisbury

Tattenhall is a village and former civil parish, now in the parish of Tattenhall and District, 8 miles (13 km) south-east of Chester, in the unitary authority area of Cheshire West and Chester and the ceremonial county of Cheshire, England. In the 2001 census, the population was recorded as 1,986, increasing to 2,079 by the 2011 census.

== History ==
The settlement of Tatenale was recorded in the Domesday Book of 1086. The name is believed to be derived from the Old English personal name Tata and halh, meaning "a meadow" or "nook of land". The spelling of the village has altered over the centuries: Tatenhala (1280), Tattenhall (1289), Tatnall (1473), Tottenhall (1553) and Tettenhall (1649).

The village was a self-sustained settlement in the fifteenth and sixteenth centuries. The building of the Chester Canal (now part of the Shropshire Union Canal) provided an economic boost to the village, improving transportation and allowing local produce to be exported. Tattenhall Road railway station opened in 1840 and linked Tattenhall to Chester and Crewe. Tattenhall railway station opened in 1872, linking the village with Whitchurch. The railways led to the establishment of industries including the manufacture of glue, gelatine, fertiliser and bricks.

Tattenhall railway station closed in 1957, as did the Whitchurch and Tattenhall Railway between Chester and Whitchurch. Tattenhall Road railway station closed in 1966 as part of the Beeching cuts. New housing developments saw the village expand through the second half of the twentieth century.

Tattenhall was a township and parish within Broxton Hundred, which became a civil parish in 1866. The population was recorded at 606 in 1801, 982 in 1851, 975 in 1901, 1,049 in 1951 and 1,986 in 2001. The civil parish was abolished on 1 April 2015 to form "Tattenhall and District".

== Community ==
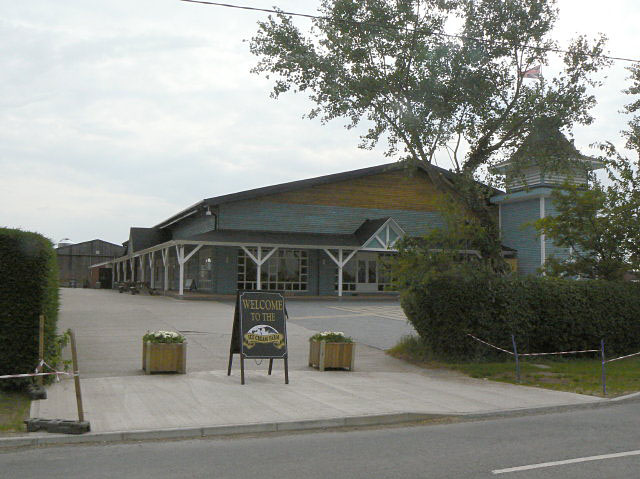
Ice cream farm

St Alban's Church is designated by English Heritage as a Grade II* listed building. Parts of the building are thought to date from the early sixteenth century. Its benefice is combined with that of All Saints, Handley. St Plegmund's Roman Catholic church in the village closed in 2012. Its 1970s building was demolished in 2014.

Tattenhall Park Primary School is a coeducational community primary school, teaching pupils aged 3–11. Older pupils travel to schools in Malpas and Tarporley for state-provided secondary education.

The village centre has a number of shops including a post office and butcher. There are three pubs in Tattenhall: The Sportmans, The Letters Inn and The Bear & Ragged Staff. A number of buildings in the centre of the village are now used as offices. Within Tattenhall are several houses designed in 1927 by the architect Clough Williams-Ellis, famous for creating the Italianate village of Portmeirion in north west Wales.

Although agriculture remains an important element of the local economy, tourism has also become more significant. The Ice Cream Farm, owned by Cheshire Farm Ice Cream, is to the north of the village in nearby Newton-by-Tattenhall. Established in 1986, it is the Guinness World Records ‘Largest Ice Cream Shop’. The 300 berth Tattenhall Marina on the Shropshire Union Canal opened in 2009.

== Governance ==
The unitary authority of Cheshire West and Chester Council replaced Chester City Council and Cheshire County Council on 1 April 2009. The Tattenhall electoral ward includes the villages of Beeston, Burwardsley and Handley, stretching east to Tilstone Fearnall and south to Broxton. In the 2001 census, the total population of the ward was recorded at 4,374.

Tattenhall is within the parliamentary constituency of Chester South and Eddisbury.

There are fifteen parish councillors for Tattenhall and District, with the most recent election taking place on 4 May 2023, although it was uncontested.

== Notable residents ==
- Edward Ould (1852–1909), an architect.
- Herbert Watkins-Pitchford (1868–1951), pioneer veterinarian working in South Africa, born and raised in Tattenhall
- Leslie Jones (1891–1962), cricketer
- Harry Threadgold (1924-1996), football goalkeeper, who played 438 games, incl. 343 for Southend United F.C.
- Tommy Scott (born 1964), frontman/songwriter of the Liverpool band Space, moved to Tattenhall in 2008
- Ben Woodburn (born 1999), footballer, raised locally, played over 125 games and 11 for Wales

== See also ==
- Listed buildings in Tattenhall
- St Alban's Church, Tattenhall
- Tattenhall Hall
- The Rookery, Tattenhall
