= Listed buildings in Foulk Stapleford =

Foulk Stapleford is a former civil parish, now in the parish of Hargrave and Huxley, in Cheshire West and Chester, England. It contains six buildings that are recorded in the National Heritage List for England as designated listed buildings. One of these is listed at the middle grade, Grade II*, and the rest at the lowest grade, Grade II. Apart from the village of Hargrave the parish is entirely rural. The listed buildings consist of farmhouses and farm buildings, the village church, and a memorial.

== Key ==
Grade	Criteria
II*	Particularly important buildings of more than special interest
II	Buildings of national importance and special interest

== Buildings ==
Name and location	Photograph	Date	Notes	Grade
Greenlooms; 53.16736°N 2.78186°W	—	Late 16th century	A farmhouse, partly timber-framed, and partly in brick on a sandstone plinth. It has an L-shaped plan, with a single storey and an attic, and has a three-bay front. The windows are casements, those in the attic being in gabled half-dormers. Inside the farmhouse are inglenooks.	II
Meadow Farmhouse; 53.15537°N 2.77692°W	—	Late 16th century	The farmhouse is built in timber framing and rendered brick, and has a slate roof. It consists of a hall with two cross wings, and a single-storey extension to the left. The rest of the farmhouse is in two storeys, with a four-bay front.	II
St Peter's Church, Hargrave; 53.1545°N 2.7710°W		1627	This was originally built as a chapel and a school. It was paid for by Thomas Moulson, who came from the village and later became Lord Mayor of London. The building was later converted for use as a church, and was restored in 1878–80. This restoration, and the addition of a vestry, have been attributed to John Douglas. The church is built in sandstone with a tiled roof, and consists of a nave and chancel in one range, a south porch and a vestry.	II*
Brereton Park Farmhouse; 53.16115°N 2.75301°W	—	1683	The farmhouse was altered in the early 19th century and a porch was added in the 20th century. It is built in brick with sandstone dressings, and has a slate roof. The windows are casements. Inside is an inglenook with a bressumer.	II
Farm buildings, Greenlooms; 53.1670°N 2.7822°W	—	Early 19th century	The farm buildings consist of a shippon and a hayloft. They are in brick on a stone plinth and have a slate roof. It is a long rectangular building with two short cross wings, in two storeys, and has a nine-bay front. The right cross wing contains a pigeon loft.	II
Memorial stone, Brereton Park Farm; 53.16292°N 2.75482°W	—	1876	A sandstone obelisk about 1.2 metres (3.9 ft) high on a plinth and with a chamfered cap. It carries an inscription to the memory of a man from the Cheshire Hunt who was accidentally killed here.	II

== See also ==
- Listed buildings in Bruen Stapleford
- Listed buildings in Burton
- Listed buildings in Christleton
- Listed buildings in Clotton Hoofield
- Listed buildings in Duddon
- Listed buildings in Huxley
- Listed buildings in Waverton
