= Barclays Bank, Enfield =

Bank building in Enfield, London

Coordinates: 51°39′08″N 0°04′55″W

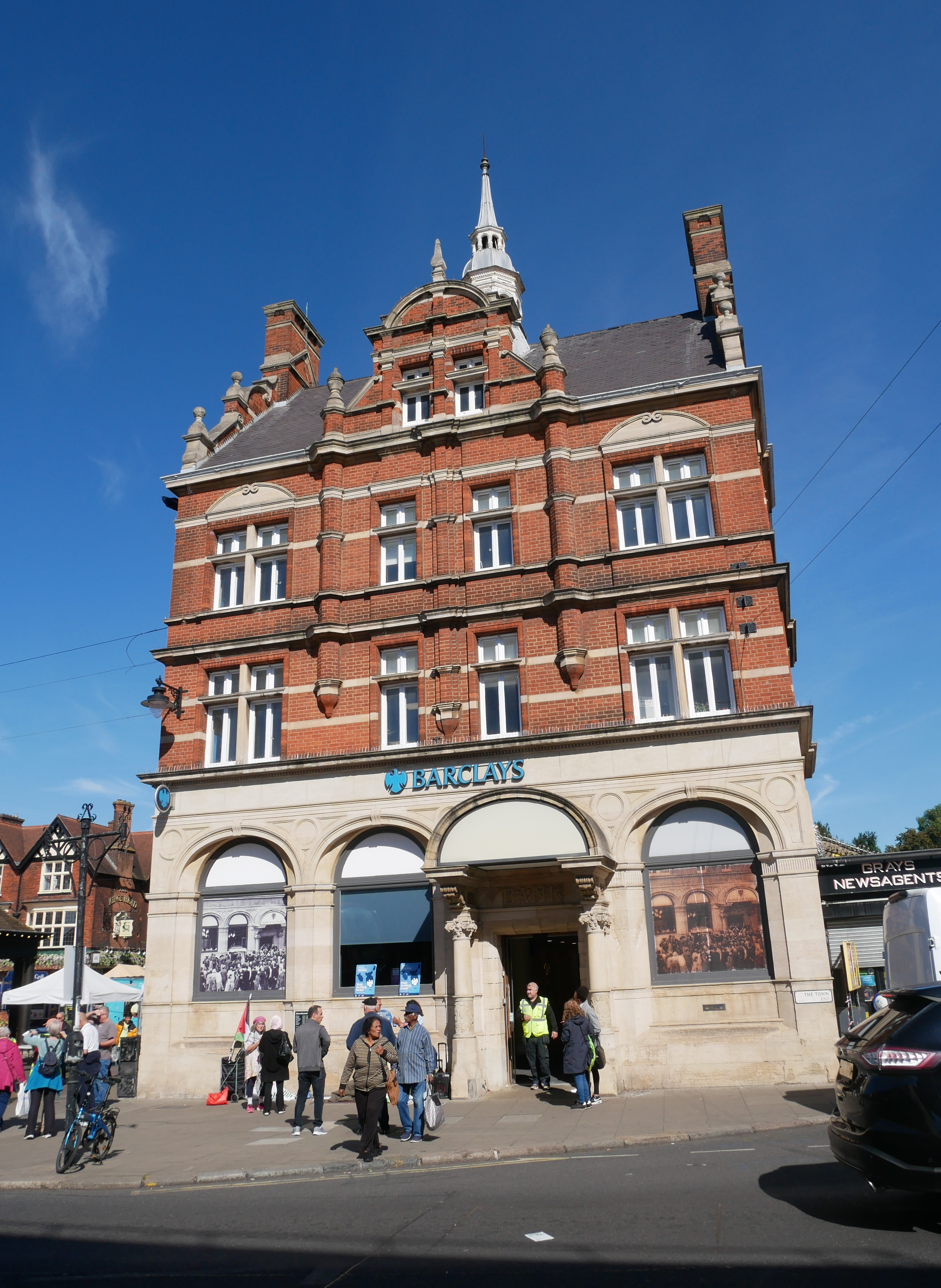
South face of Barclays Bank, Enfield

Barclays Bank, at 20 The Town, Enfield, formerly the London and Provincial Bank, is a Grade II listed building in the London Borough of Enfield. It was designed by William Gillbee Scott in a Flemish Renaissance style and completed in 1897. London and Provincial were taken over by Barclays Bank in 1918.

The interior of the building has been greatly altered since 1897. It received an interior redesign in 1919 and the original double-height banking hall has been reduced to one storey. In the mid-twentieth century a block of offices was built at the rear but those are not listed. In 1967, the world's first automatic teller machine (ATM) was installed on the west side of the building and in 2017, a gold-coloured ATM and plaque were installed to mark the spot.

== History ==
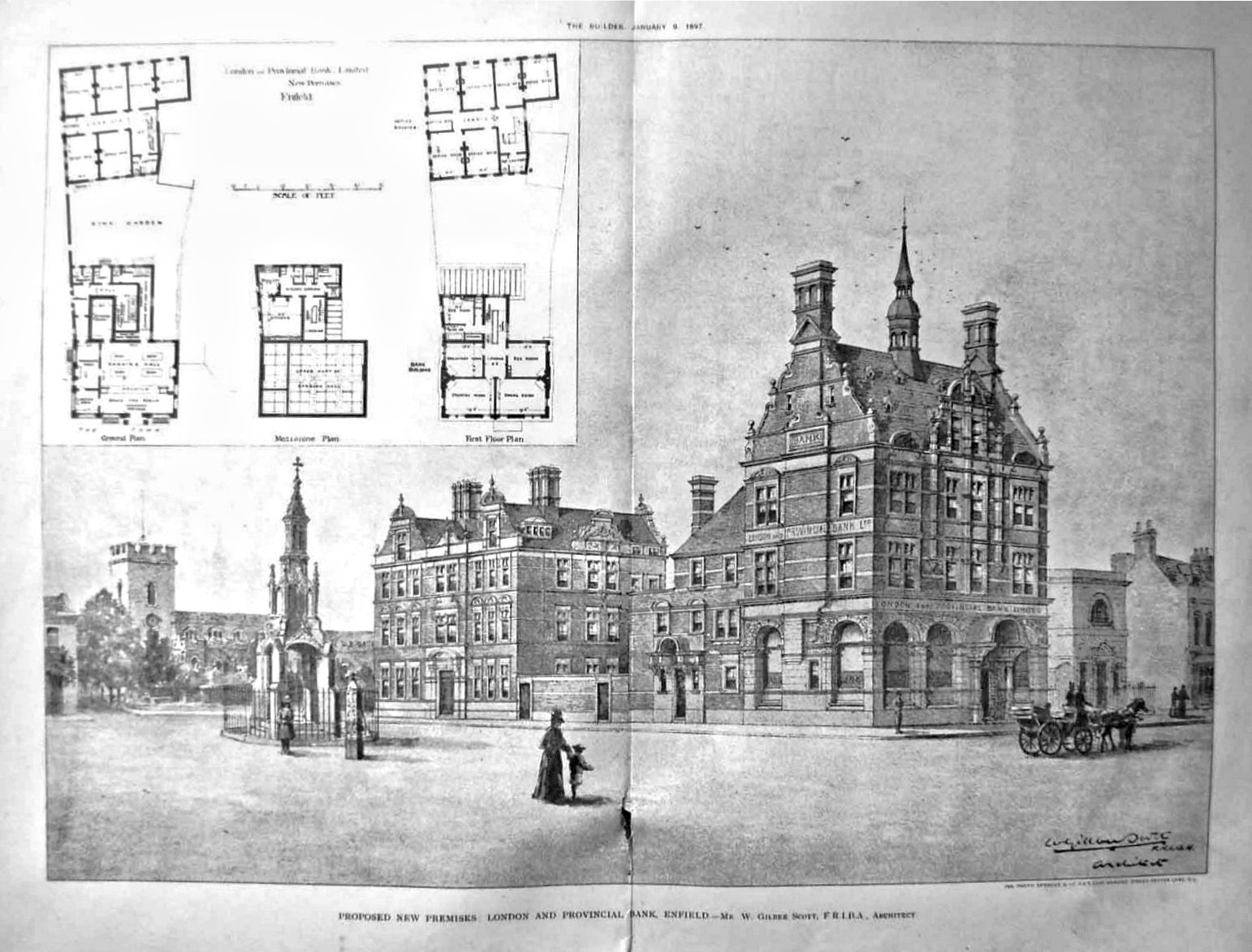
Design for the London and Provincial Bank, Enfield, by W. Gillbee Scott, The Builder, 1897.

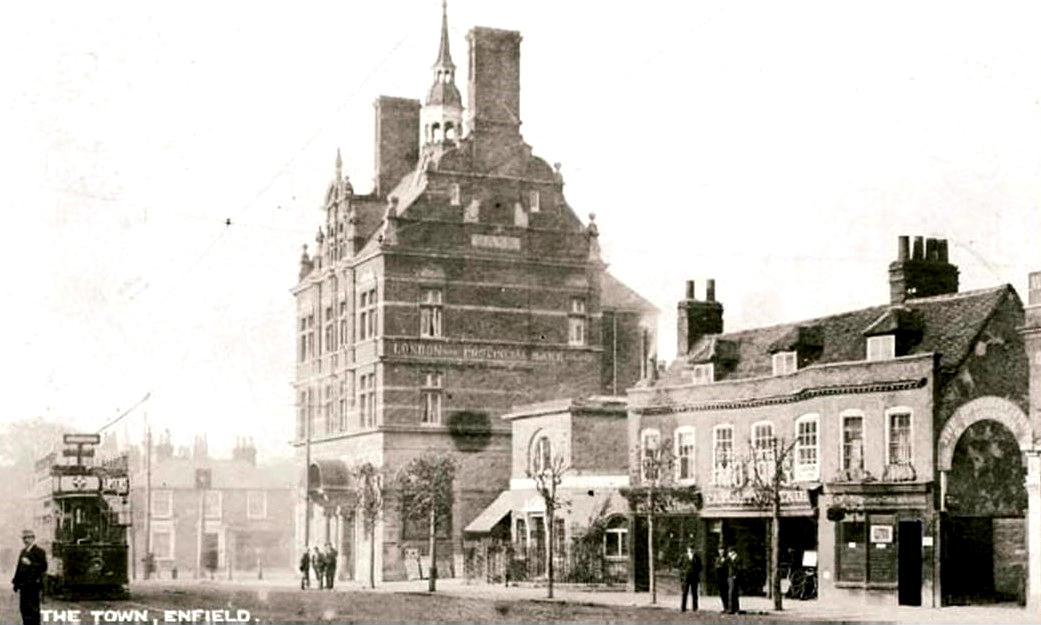
The bank, c. 1909, when still London and Provincial

The first bank to open a branch in Enfield was the London and Provincial Bank in 1875. In 1894, they bought the Greyhound Inn and terraced houses on the eastern side of Enfield Market Square, and in 1896 launched an architectural competition for a new building on that site. The London architect William Gillbee Scott was the winner with his designs shown at the Royal Academy and published in The Builder in January 1897. They were for a main bank building and a block of offices in a similar style to the rear but only the main building was built at the time.

The bank was built by Alan Fairhead and Son of Cecil Road, Enfield, and completed in December 1897. It is of red brick in Flemish bond with stone dressings to all storeys which completely cover the ground floor front elevation. The style is Flemish Renaissance. In 1918, the London and Provincial became Barclays Bank.

The interior of the bank has been much changed during its existence with a redesign by Alfred Foster in 1919 at a cost of £4,055 (equivalent to £235,379 in 2023) and other changes including the loss of the original double-height banking hall that has been reduced to one storey. In the mid-twentieth century a single storey block of offices was added at the rear.

The bank was listed Grade II on the National Heritage List for England in March 2023, in part for its group value with the adjacent Grade II listed Old Vestry Office. The twentieth-century office extension is not included in the listing. To the rear is the Grade II* listed St Andrew's Church and to its west is the Enfield market square. The bank faces Hatton Walk and various retail buildings on the south side of The Town.

== World's first ATM ==
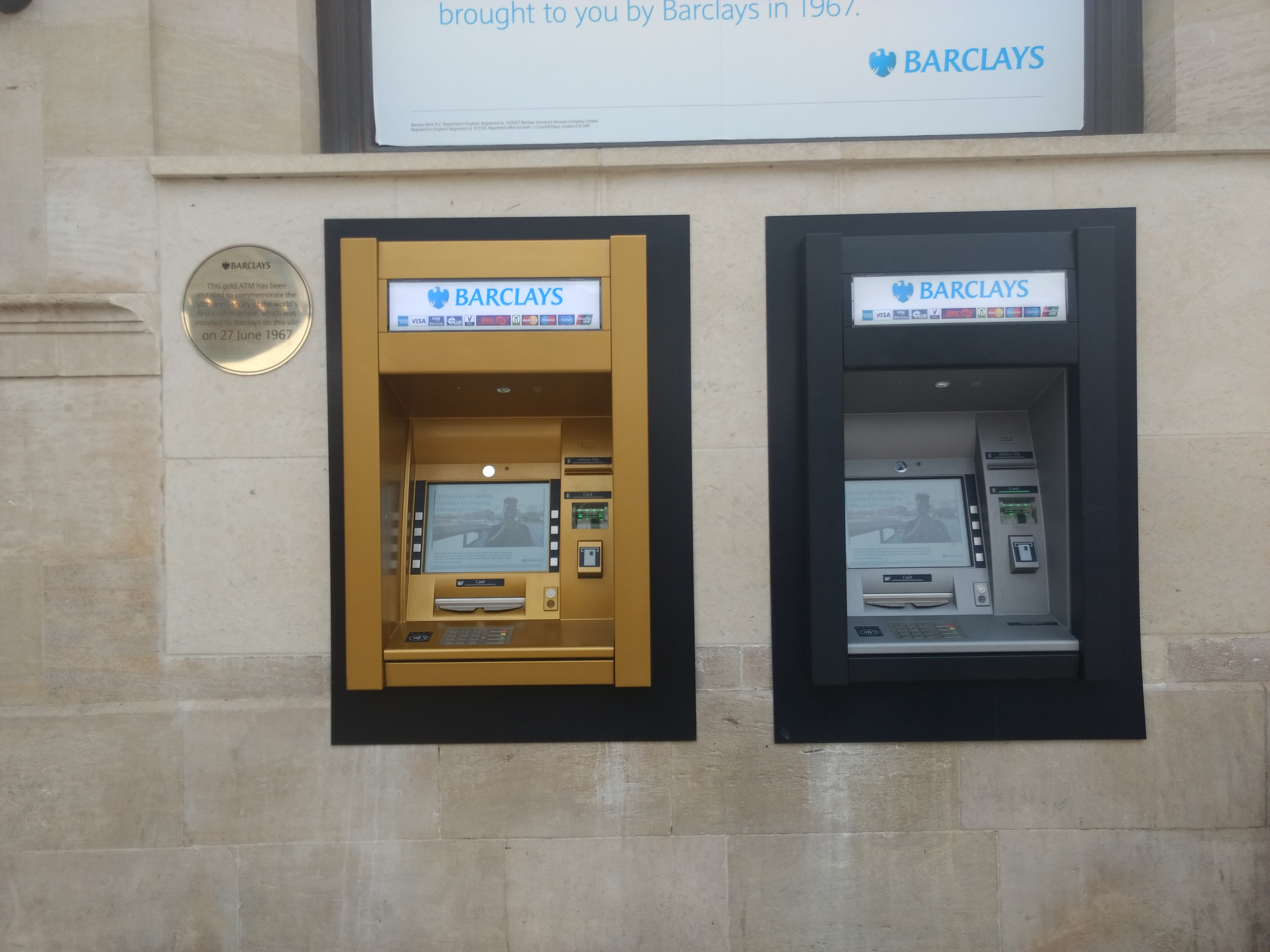
Gold ATM and plaque on the site of the world's first ATM on the west (market) side of the building

The world's first cash machine or automatic teller machine, invented by John Shepherd-Barron, was installed on the western side of the building on 27 June 1967 and opened by the actor and Enfield resident Reg Varney, best known for his lead role in the television sitcom On the Buses (1969-1973). The maximum permitted cash withdrawal at the time was £10 (equivalent to £229 in 2023), and customers had to purchase a paper voucher in advance which they inserted into the machine, along with a personal identification number (PIN). The Enfield branch of Barclays was chosen for the installation because it was likely to easily obtain planning permission for the machine, had a good pavement facade, sufficiently high windows, and a clientele that was a good cross-section of banking customers.

In 2017, Barclays commemorated the 50th anniversary of the first ATM by installing a gold-coloured ATM and a plaque at the site of the original machine.

== Gallery ==
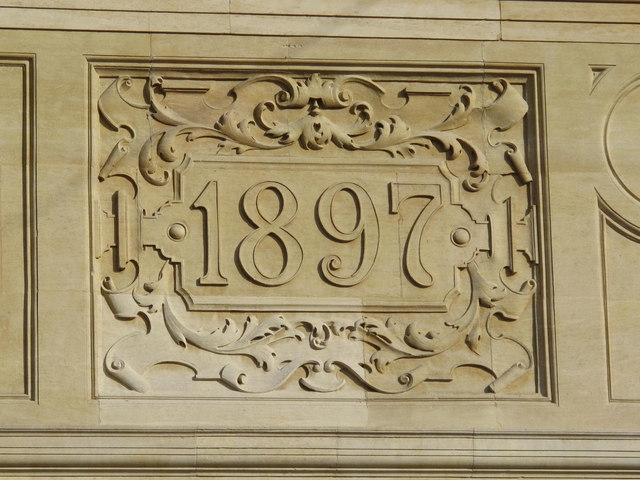
Date stone

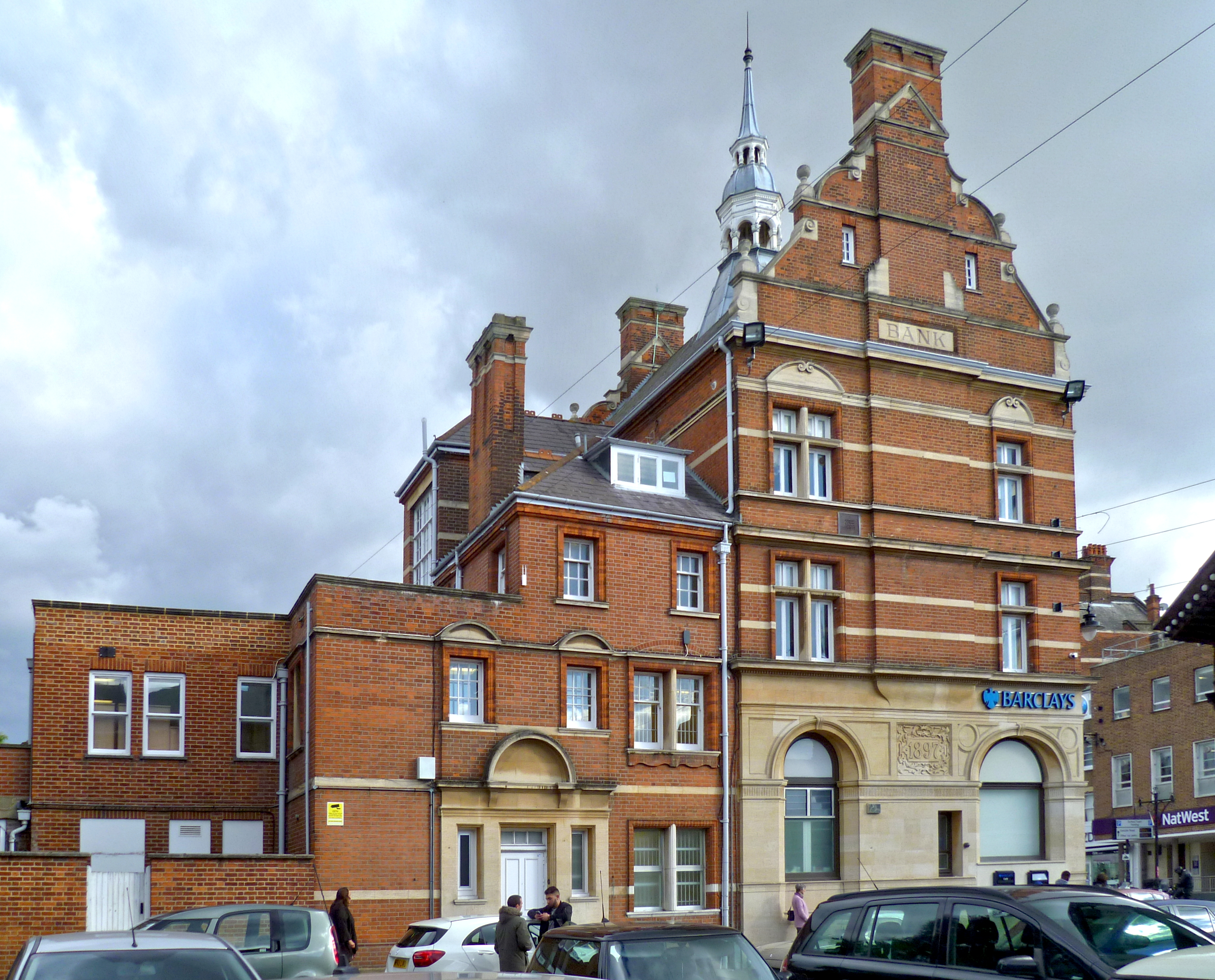
Seen from Enfield market square

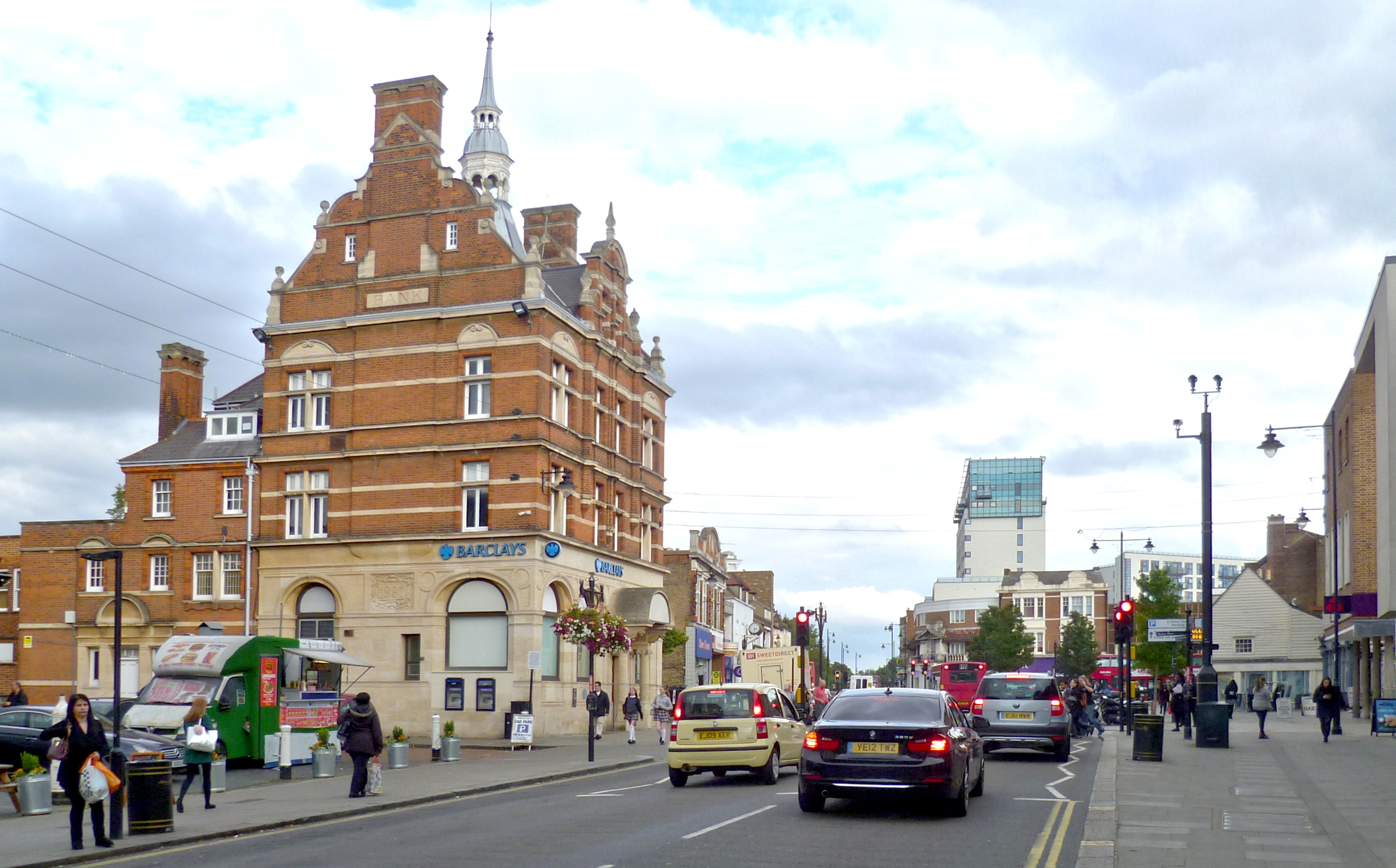
Position in The Town

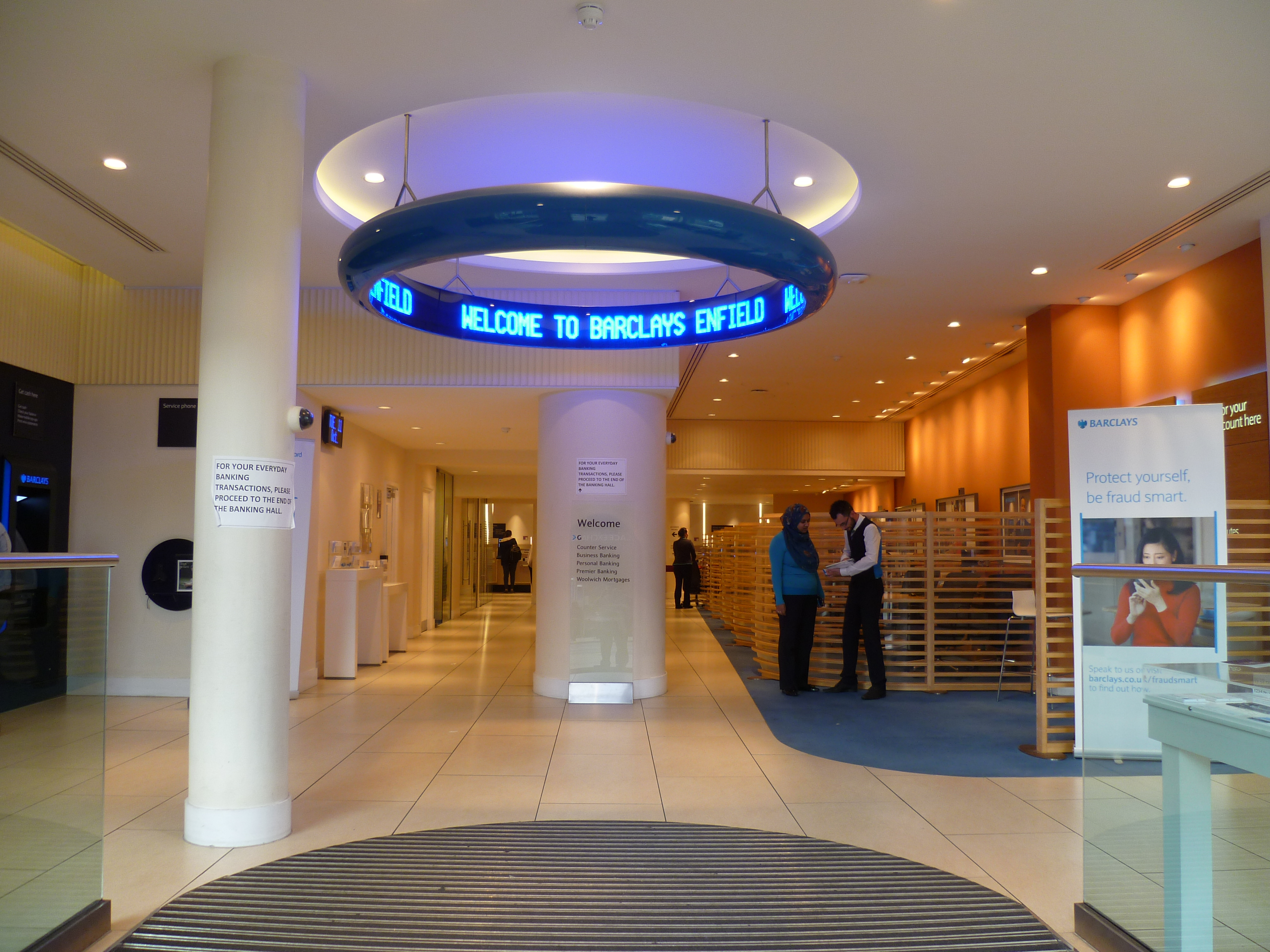
Interior, October 2016
