= Forty Hall =

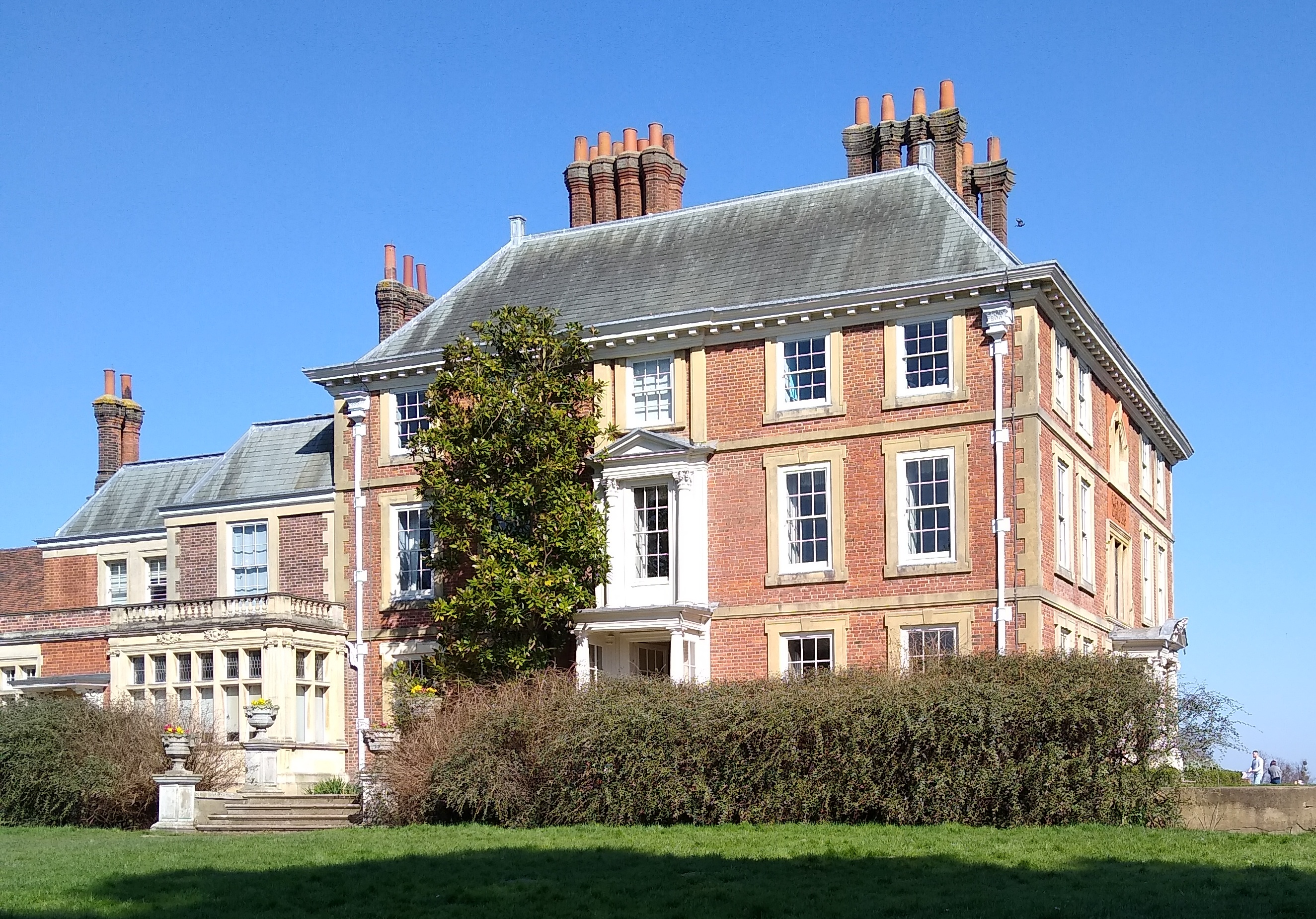
- Forty Hall from the south

- Location within London Borough of Enfield
- 51°40′13″N 0°04′07″W
- Type: Manor House
- Location: Forty Hill

History
- Built: 1620s

Site notes
- Area: Enfield
- Owner: London Borough of Enfield

Listed Building – Grade I
- Official name: Forty Hall
- Designated: 12 March 1951
- Reference no.: 1294469

Forty Hall is a manor house of the 1620s in Forty Hill in Enfield, north London. The house, a Grade I listed building, is today used as a museum by the London Borough of Enfield. Within the grounds is the site of the former Tudor Elsyng Palace.

== Location ==
Forty Hall is located in the north of the London Borough of Enfield, the northernmost borough of London. The hall and formal park are located on the top of Forty Hill, a level gravel plateau standing above the flood plain of the River Lea to the east, and the valley of the Turkey Brook to the north and west. The park slopes down into the valley, where the remains of old ponds lie on the London Clay. A loop in the former course of the New River forms the boundary of much of the estate, though this has since been re-routed to the east. To the north are Whitewebbs and Myddelton House. The road to the east was formerly the main route from Enfield to Waltham Cross, but traffic has been re-routed via the A10.

== History ==
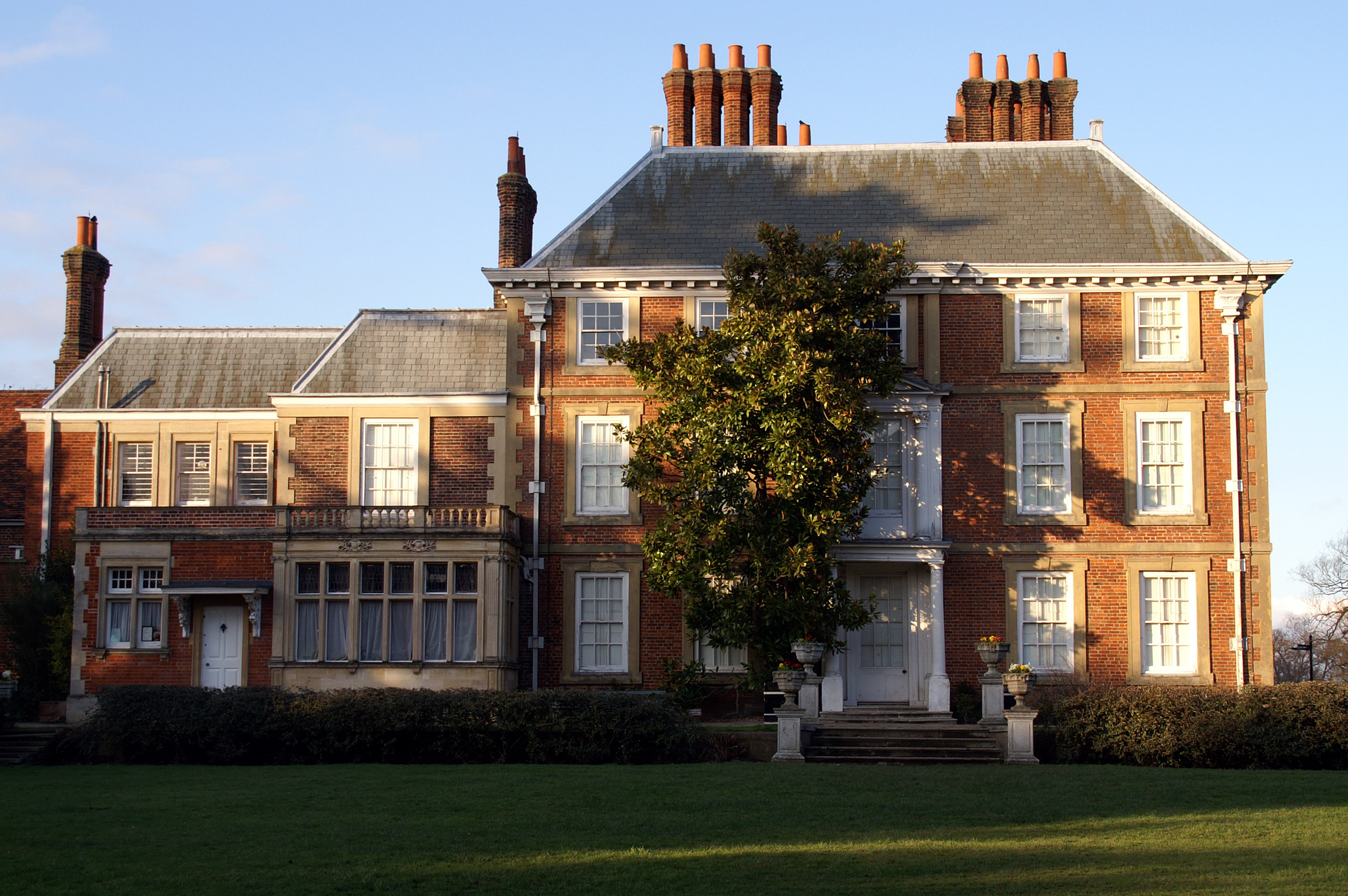
Southern aspect and south-west wing

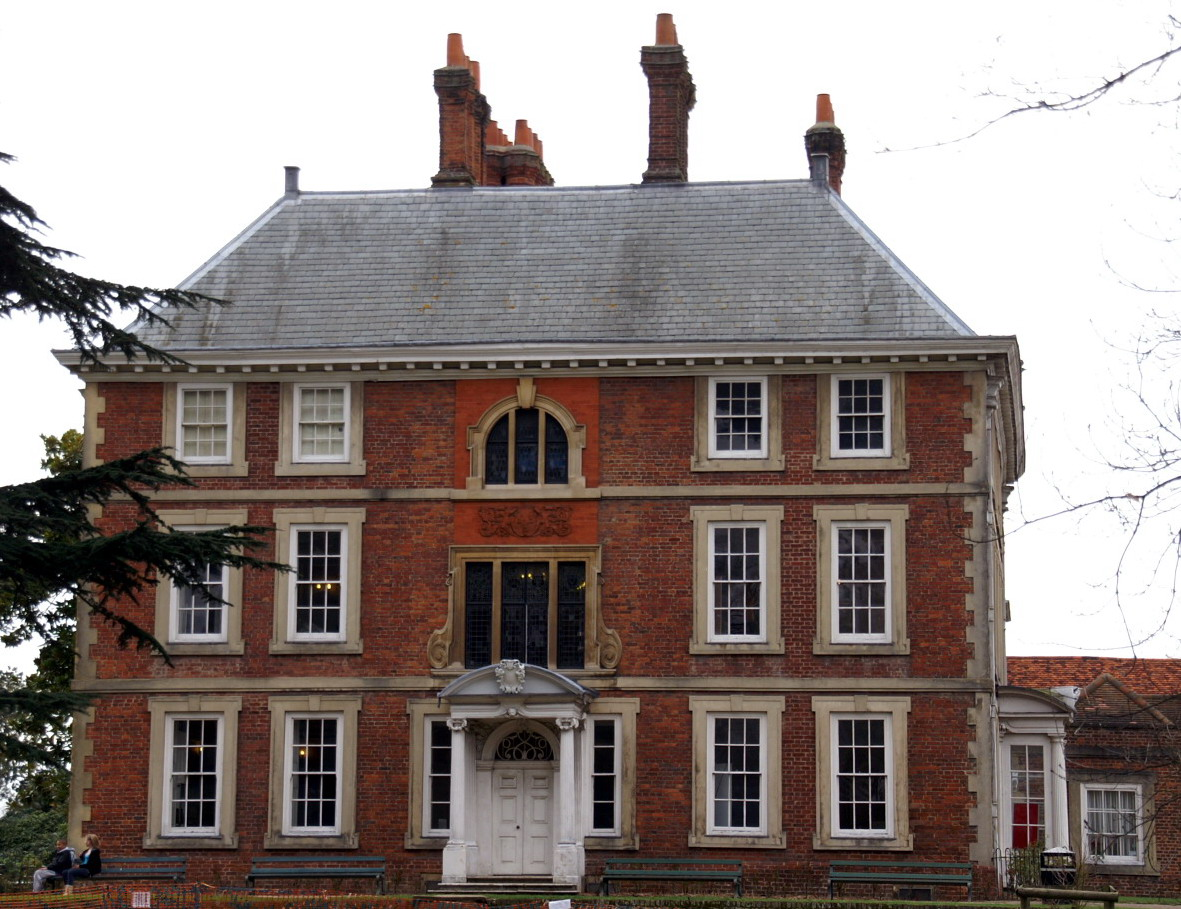
Eastern aspect

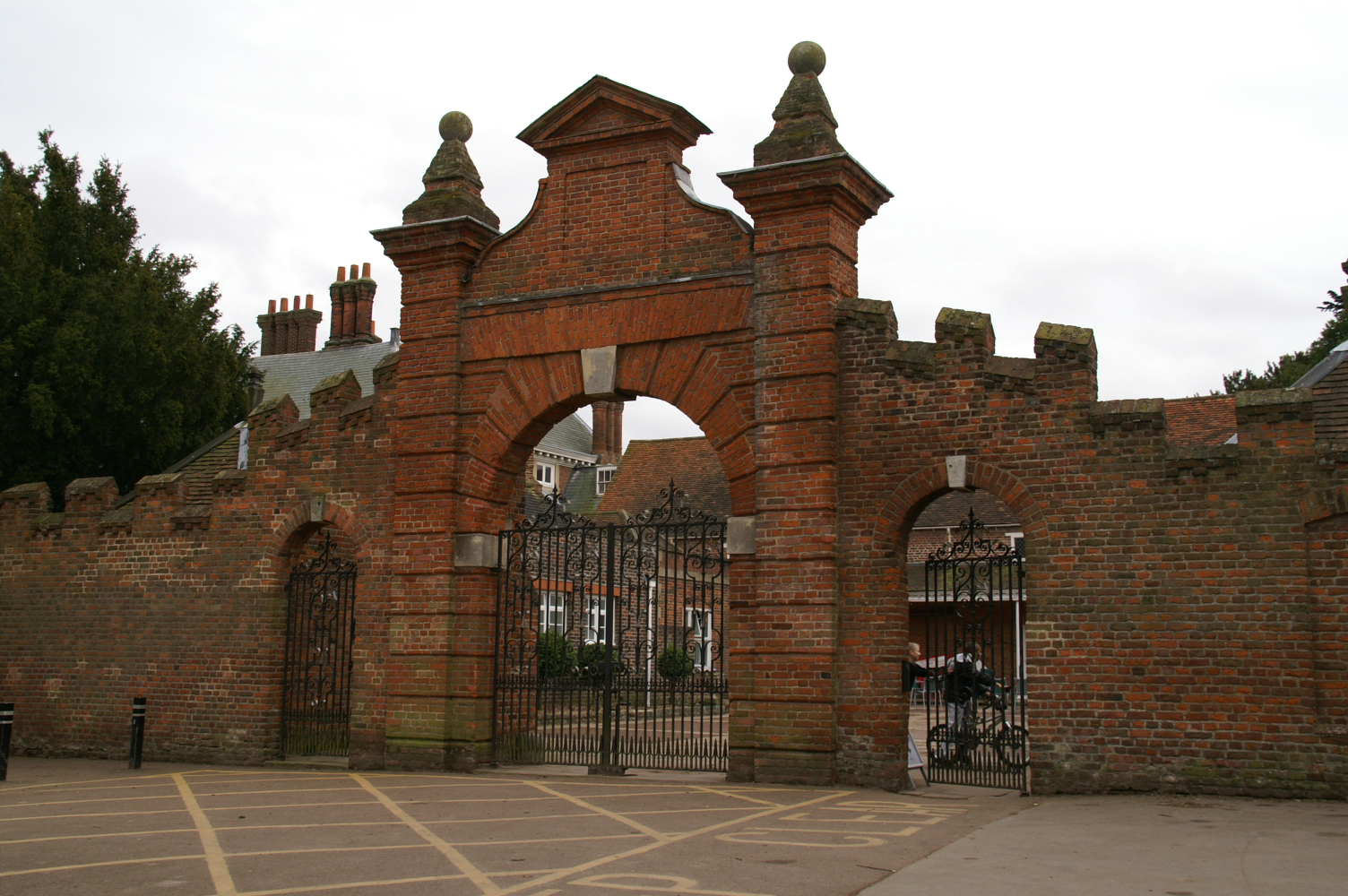
Stable gateway (c.1650)

The house was built between 1629 and 1632. It is generally said to have been built by Sir Nicholas Rainton, a wealthy London haberdasher who was Lord Mayor of London from 1632 to 1633. However Tuff, writing in 1858, says that it was built by Sir Hugh Fortee and bought by Rainton, quoting a 1635 survey describing a copyhold house "some time Hugh Fortee's, and late Sir Thomas Gurney's". Lambert also gives Fortee as the origin of the name.

The detailed history of the house has until recently been poorly understood, since it is known to have been built in the 1620s, but has the external appearance of an 18th-century house. A detailed examination was carried out for Enfield council as part of the Forty Hall Conservation Plan. This concluded that the house was probably not designed by a famous architect such as Inigo Jones, but by a "clever artisan builder".

The original square house was not altered much in the 17th century other than a small extension to the northwest in 1636. In 1640 Rainton was imprisoned for refusing to help Charles I raise a loan. He died in 1646 aged 77 and was buried at St Andrew's Church in Enfield. The hall then passed to his great-nephew, also Nicholas. He was able to extend the estate northwards by buying and demolishing the neighbouring Elsyng Palace in 1656. In 1696 the hall passed to John Wolstenholme (probably a descendant of the financier and merchant of the same name and member of the Virginia Company), who carried out major refurbishment possibly following a fire, including construction of an extension to the south-west, and planted the avenue. In 1740 the house passed to Eliab Breton, who remodelled the ground floor. Later owners included Edmund Armstrong (1787) and James Meyer (1799), whose family built the nearby Jesus Church in 1835.

In 1894 the hall was bought by Henry Carrington Bowles of the neighbouring Myddelton House for his son Major Henry Ferryman Bowles (1858–1943), MP for Enfield and later 1st Baronet Bowles. In 1897 there were further changes including enlargement of the southwest wing. In 1951 the Bowles family sold it to the Municipal Borough of Enfield, the predecessor of the London Borough of Enfield. It has since been used as a museum.

The Hall closed to the public in late 2010 for a major redevelopment project funded by Enfield Council and the Heritage Lottery Fund. Alterations included the restoration of the original position of the staircase. The Hall reopened on 30 June 2012.

== The house and estate today ==
The Hall's permanent exhibition tells the story of the house and its estate throughout the ages and looks at the life and times of Sir Nicholas Rainton and life in the 17th century through a range of visual and audio interpretation and displays. There is also a range of guided tours, led by a Jacobean character. The exhibition programme focuses on art, ecology and heritage.

== Grounds ==
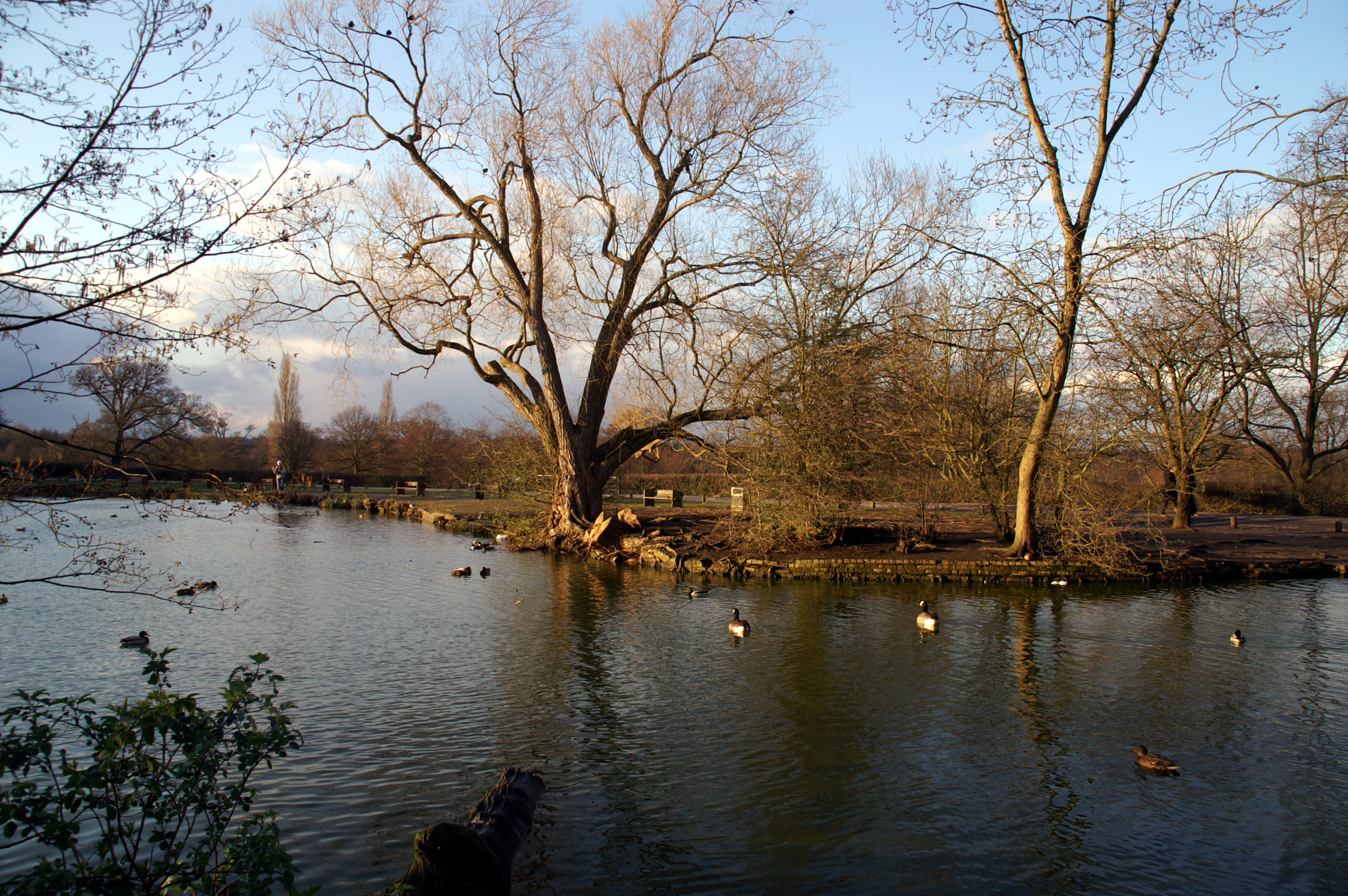
The lake

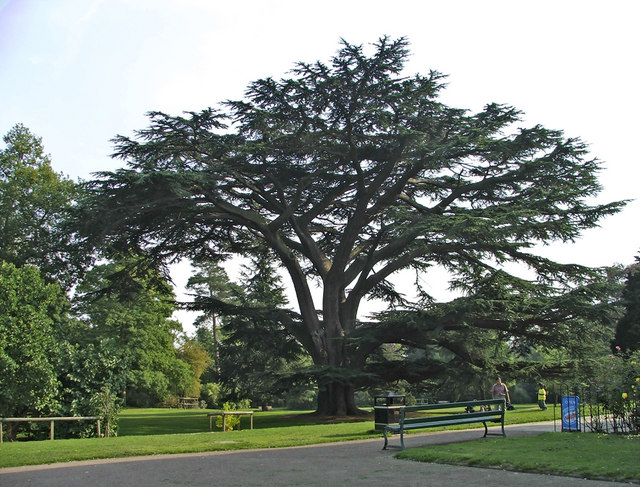
Cedar of Lebanon at Forty Hall

The estate of around 107 hectares (260 acres) makes up part of the London Metropolitan Green Belt. Around the house are formal gardens, a small lake and a magnificent Cedar of Lebanon, one of the Great Trees of London, and the county girth Champion for Greater London. The remainder includes a park that is open to the public and a farm. An avenue of trees runs down the hill from the house into the valley of the Turkey Brook, also known locally as Maidens Brook. The northern and much of the southern boundary are marked by the former course of the New River.

== In popular culture ==
- It was the location for two episodes of BBC One’s Antiques Roadshow transmitted in January and March 2021 and another in July 2024.
