= Lower Huxley Hall =

Country house in Cheshire, England

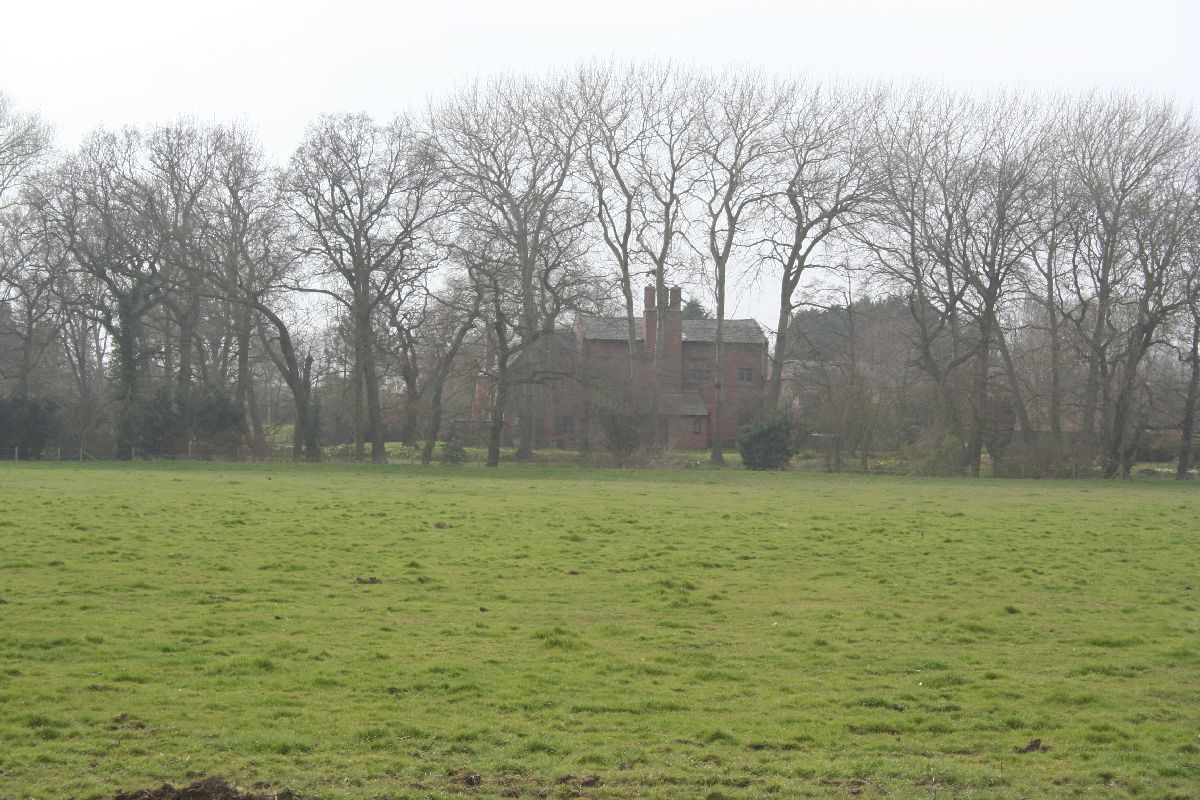

- Location within Cheshire

General information
- Architectural style: Moated manor house
- Location: Huxley, Cheshire, England
- Coordinates: 53.15519°N 2.75235°W
- Completed: 15th century

Lower Huxley Hall is a moated manor house in Cheshire, England, located about 6.5 miles (10 km) southeast of Chester. It lies roughly halfway between the villages of Huxley (to the southeast) and Hargrave (to the southwest), It dates from the late 15th century, with major additions and alterations in the 17th century. A small addition was made to the rear in the 19th century. It was originally a courtyard house, but only two wings remain. The house is designated by English Heritage as a Grade II* listed building.

== History ==
The house was originally the seat of the Clive family. John Tilston inherited the property upon the death of his elder brother Henry in 1613. Their father Ralph Tilston had purchased half of the Huxley estate from a relative Ralph Huxley in 1580. During the English Civil War the house was taken over by Colonel Croxton and the Parliamentary forces on 5 September 1644, and served as a base for the Siege of Chester. In 1810 it was described as being a farmhouse, and was still so in 1935. There is also a Higher Huxley Hall, less than half a mile immediately to the south which dates to at least the 13th century and is now run as a hotel.

== Architecture ==
The house is approached by a bridge over the moat. This dates from the late medieval era, with its parapet and later work dating from the 17th century. It is constructed in ashlar pink and buff sandstone. On the hall side of the bridge is a semicircular archway. This is in Jacobean style, and is decorated with scrolls and finials. The bridge and archway are listed at Grade II*. The moated site on which the house stands is a Scheduled Monument.

The east wing is partly timber-framed internally, the remainder being constructed in orange brick, with blue brick diapering. The dressings are in buff sandstone, and the house is roofed in Welsh slate with a stone ridge. It has two storeys and an attic, and its west front is symmetrical with three bays. The end bays project forward and have coped gables. They contain five-light mullioned and transomed windows in both storeys. The centre bay has two three-light mullioned and transomed windows in the lower storey, and a single similar window in the upper storey. Between the storeys in the central bay is a heraldic plaque. The south wing is in brick on a stone plinth, and also has mullioned and transomed windows. The house is recorded in the National Heritage List for England as a designated Grade II* listed building. Today the house is set in a 4-acre garden, described as having "follies; pergolas; arches; a moat; herbaceous, shrub and rose beds; within a picturesque arid romantic setting."

== See also ==
- Listed buildings in Huxley, Cheshire
