= Listed buildings in Huxley, Cheshire =

Huxley is a former civil parish, now in the parishes of Hargrave and Huxley and Tattenhall and District, in Cheshire West and Chester, England. It contains four buildings that are recorded in the National Heritage List for England as designated listed buildings. Two of these are listed at Grade II*, the middle grade, and the other two are at the lowest grade, Grade II. Apart from the village of Huxley, the parish is entirely rural. The listed buildings consist of a former manor house on a moated site, a bridge across the moat, a farm building, and a canal bridge.

== Key ==
Grade	Criteria
II*	Particularly important buildings of more than special interest
II	Buildings of national importance and special interest

== Buildings ==
Name and location	Photograph	Date	Notes	Grade
Bridge, archway and wall, Lower Huxley Hall; 53.15498°N 2.75263°W	—	Late medieval	The bridge crosses the moat around the hall, with an archway on the hall side of the bridge, and the remains of a former curtain wall. Apart from a few bricks in the wall, the structures are in sandstone. The bridge has two segmental arches, triangular cutwaters, a plain parapet, and a flagged carriageway. The archway has a rosette on its keystone, and an entablature with an open pediment flanked by finials. Only stubs of the wall remain.	II*
Lower Huxley Hall; 53.1552°N 2.7524°W	—	Late 15th century	The former manor house stands on a moated site. Major additions and alterations were made to it in the 17th century. The house is partly timber-framed, the rest being in orange brick, with blue brick diapering. It has sandstone dressings and a Welsh slate roof. The house has an L-shaped plan, and is in two storeys with attics. The east wing has a symmetrical three-bay west front, the end bays projecting with gables. The windows are mullioned and transomed. The moated site on which the hall stands is a scheduled monument.	II*
Shippon, Leadgate Farm; 53.15855°N 2.73583°W	—	Early 17th century	Originally a barn, the building was altered and largely rebuilt in the 18th century. The upper storey is timber-framed with brick nogging, the rest being in brick. The roof is tiled. The building has a long rectangular plan. Features include entrances, some blocked, three-pane windows, and open panels in the upper storey acting as pitch holes.	II
Canal bridge No 111 (Williamson's Bridge); 53.13715°N 2.72849°W		c. 1775	An accommodation bridge crossing the Shropshire Union Canal designed by Samuel Weston for the Chester Canal Company. The bridge is built in brick, and consists of a segmental arch on low piers, and has a plain parapet with stone coping. Curved wing walls end in square pilasters.	II

== See also ==
- Listed buildings in Aldford
- Listed buildings in Beeston
- Listed buildings in Burton
- Listed buildings in Christleton
- Listed buildings in Clotton Hoofield
- Listed buildings in Duddon
- Listed buildings in Golborne David
- Listed buildings in Saighton
- Listed buildings in Tarvin
- Listed buildings in Tattenhall
- Listed buildings in Tilstone Fearnall
- Listed buildings in Tiverton
- Listed buildings in Waverton
