= Anne (Radcliffe) Mowlson =

Early benefactor of the fledgling colonial Harvard College

Lady Anne Moulson
- Born: Anne Radcliffe; 1576
- Died: 1661 (aged 84–85)
- Other names: Ann Mowlson, Anne Radclyffe
- Known for: Namesake of Radcliffe College (now Radcliffe Institute)
- Spouse: Thomas Moulson (m. 1600; died 1638)

Lady Anne Moulson (1576–1661), was an early benefactor of the fledgling colonial Harvard College. She is remembered today in the name of the Radcliffe Institute for Advanced Study.

Ann Radcliffe was the daughter of Anthony Radcliffe, Merchant Taylor of London and sheriff in 1586, who married Elizabeth Bright in 1558. In 1600 Anne married Thomas Moulson, an alderman and member of the Grocers' Company who served as Lord Mayor of London in 1634. They lived in the parish of St Christopher le Stocks. They owned and operated an inn in London. They had two children but both died young. Thomas Moulson died in 1638, leaving the customary half of his estate to his widow Anne. Ann had a head for business and managed her own business for the next twenty-three years. In addition to the inn, she loaned money and invested in import ventures. She was also active in the Puritan cause, contributing toward hiring a Puritan lecturer in her parish and giving generously to other charities. In 1643 she donated some of her money to found the first endowed scholarship at Harvard. When in 1894 the women's annex to the university was chartered as a full college, it was given the name of Harvard's first female benefactor.

She died in October 1661. In her will she left bequests to the descendants of her sister Dorothy, who married William Gerard (died 1609) and of her brother Edward Radcliffe.
