= London and Provincial Bank =

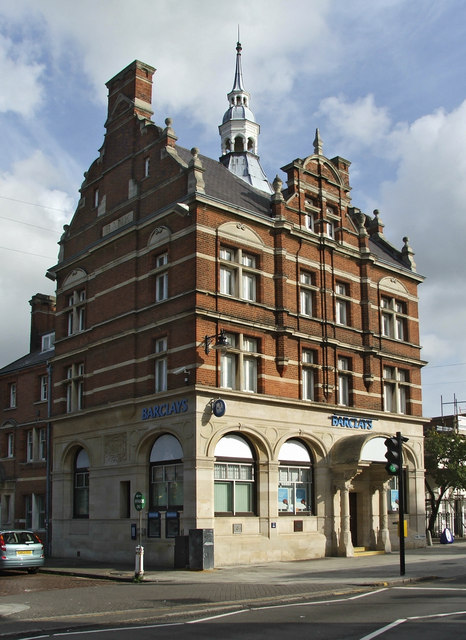
Barclays Bank, The Town, Enfield, originally built for the London and Provincial in 1897 to a design by William Gillbee Scott.

The London and Provincial Bank, originally known as the Provincial Banking Corporation, was established in 1864.

It took over Day, Nicholson and Stone in 1864, and the Bank of Wales in 1865. It was reorganised in 1870 and became the London and Provincial Bank Limited with an authorised capital of £1m. In 1871/72 it acquired the firm of Fincham and Simpson.

Most branches were in suburbs of London, the eastern counties of England and south Wales. In 1917 it merged with the London and South Western, to form the London, Provincial and South Western Bank, which was acquired by Barclays Bank in 1918.
