= Elsyng Palace =

Archaeological site in London, England

Coordinates: 51.672385°N 0.063448°W

Elsyng Palace (variously also Elsynge, Elsing, Elsings) was a Tudor palace on the site of what are now the grounds of Forty Hall in Enfield, north London. Its exact location was lost for many years until excavations were carried out in the 1960s.

== Location ==
Elsyng, also known as Enfield House, should not be confused with Enfield Manor House, known after the end of the eighteenth century as Enfield Palace. This was located near the market place in Enfield Town, with parts surviving until 1928. Elsyng was in the separate manor called Wroth's, Tiptofts and later Worcesters. The house lay within the present estate of the later Forty Hall, to the north-east of the hall and to the south of Turkey Brook. The site is now a scheduled ancient monument.

== History ==
The manor originally known as Wroth's Place was inherited in 1413 by John Tiptoft, 1st Baron Tiptoft (whose mother was Agnes Wroth) from his cousin Elizabeth Wroth. John was succeeded by his son John Tiptoft, 1st Earl of Worcester (1427–70) who is said to have built the house. After Worcester's execution in 1470 the manor (now called Tiptofts) passed to his sister Phillipa. From here it passed to Phillipa's son Edmund de Ros, 10th Baron de Ros and in 1492 to Edmund's sister Isabel and her husband Sir Thomas Lovell, Speaker of the House of Commons. On Lovell's death in 1524, it passed to his great-nephew, Thomas Manners, 1st Earl of Rutland. In 1539 he exchanged the manor, by now called Worcesters, with property in Leicestershire, and the manor therefore came into the ownership of Henry VIII.

Henry VIII visited Elsyng, "the palatial Middlesex home of Sir Thomas Lovell, more frequently than any other residence belonging to a lay subject. Foreign visitors were invariably housed at Sir Thomas Lovell's mansion...As treasurer of the household, Lovell played an important role in Wolsey's administration but perhaps it was the splendour of Elsings coupled with its convenient location which most attracted the king."

The original building date of the house is not known. Earliest traced records show it belonged to Thomas Elsyng, a Citizen and Mercer of London. Under the ownership of Sir Thomas Lovell it was extended to become a brick palace sufficient to receive the court on progress; Lovell also contributed to the clerestory and glazing of Enfield parish church. Henry VIII's sister Queen Margaret of Scotland stayed at Lovell's house in 1516.

After 1539, the estate which was called Little Park was used by Henry VIII as a base for hunting. His children spent part of their childhood here. Extensive repairs were made at Elsyng by James Nedeham, Clerk of the King's Works from 1539, and in December 1542 in preparation for a Christmas visit by Prince Edward and his sisters Mary and Elizabeth. Scottish prisoners and hostages taken at the Battle of Solway Moss visited Prince Edward at Enfield on New Year's Day 1543. It is where Elizabeth and Edward heard of their father's death.

As Queen, Elizabeth is believed to have stayed at Elsyng on at least four occasions. In January 1560, Elizabeth I appointed John Astley and Kat Astley keepers of the palace, with the adjacent manor of Worcesters, the New Park, and its game.

The palace fell out of use in the Stuart period in favour of nearby Theobalds. In 1608 James I had it partly demolished and the materials used for extensions there. A garden orchard was constructed in 1611. The remaining parts of the house, including the gatehouse and hall, were occupied from 1616 to 1623 by Philip Herbert, Earl of Montgomery. Some of the external walls were plastered and painted or pencilled with russet and ochre as imitation brickwork, and in 1619 Lady Montgomery, Lady Anne Dormer, and Lady Norris had apartments in the house.

The Earl of Montgomery produced a masque entertainment at Enfield in December 1618, performed by male courtiers and attended by Lucy Russell, Countess of Bedford. The theme was a country wedding and George Goring played a farmer's son. According to Gerard Herbert, the masque was performed again at Theobald for King James.

By 1630, however, Philip Herbert had succeeded his brother as Earl of Pembroke and was busy remodelling Wilton House. Elsyng probably began to fall into disrepair. In 1641 Charles I sold the house and the adjoining Little Park to Pembroke for £5,300.

In 1646, Nicholas Raynton, owner of the neighbouring Forty Hall, died and his estate passed to his son, also Nicholas. Following the death of Pembroke in 1650, Raynton acquired the remains of Elsyng to extend the Forty Hall estate. Initially the ruins of the palace may have been retained as a folly; however, it was eventually demolished sometime in the 1650s with some reuse of bricks in other houses around Enfield. By 1823, only the traces of fish ponds and crop-marks at the site of the house were visible.

== Archaeology ==
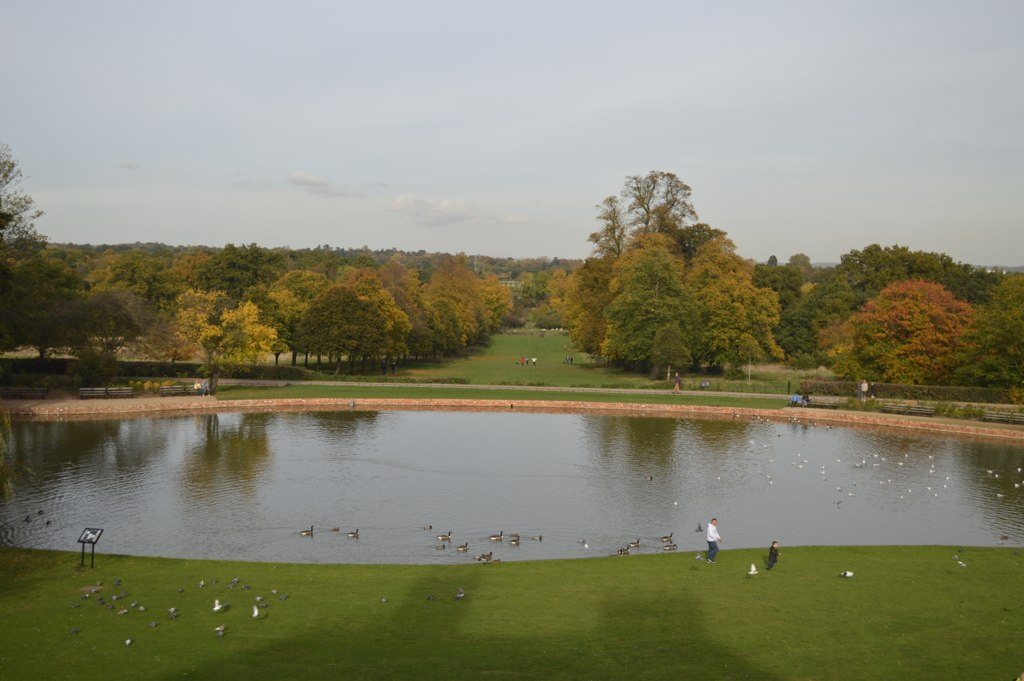
Present day view towards the site of Elsyng Palace

The rediscovery of the palace site began in the 1960s with the local Enfield Archaeological Society finding traces of Tudor vaulted brick drains, and traces of the royal apartments. Subsequent digs in 2004, 2005 and later have revealed further traces of the palace and its associated outbuildings.
