= Soho Baptist Chapel =

Church in London, England

Coordinates: 51°30′51″N 0°07′39″W

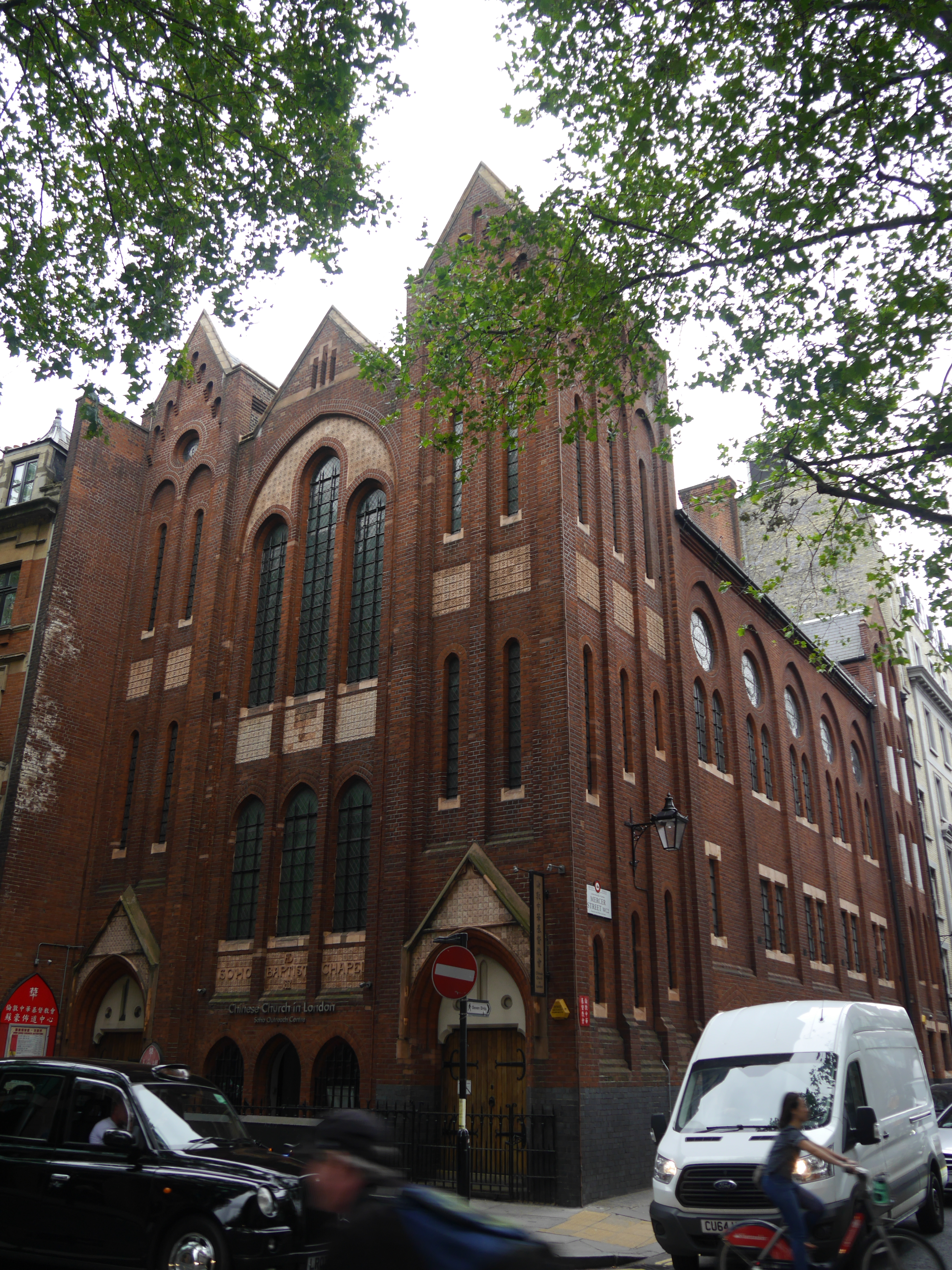
Soho Baptist Chapel

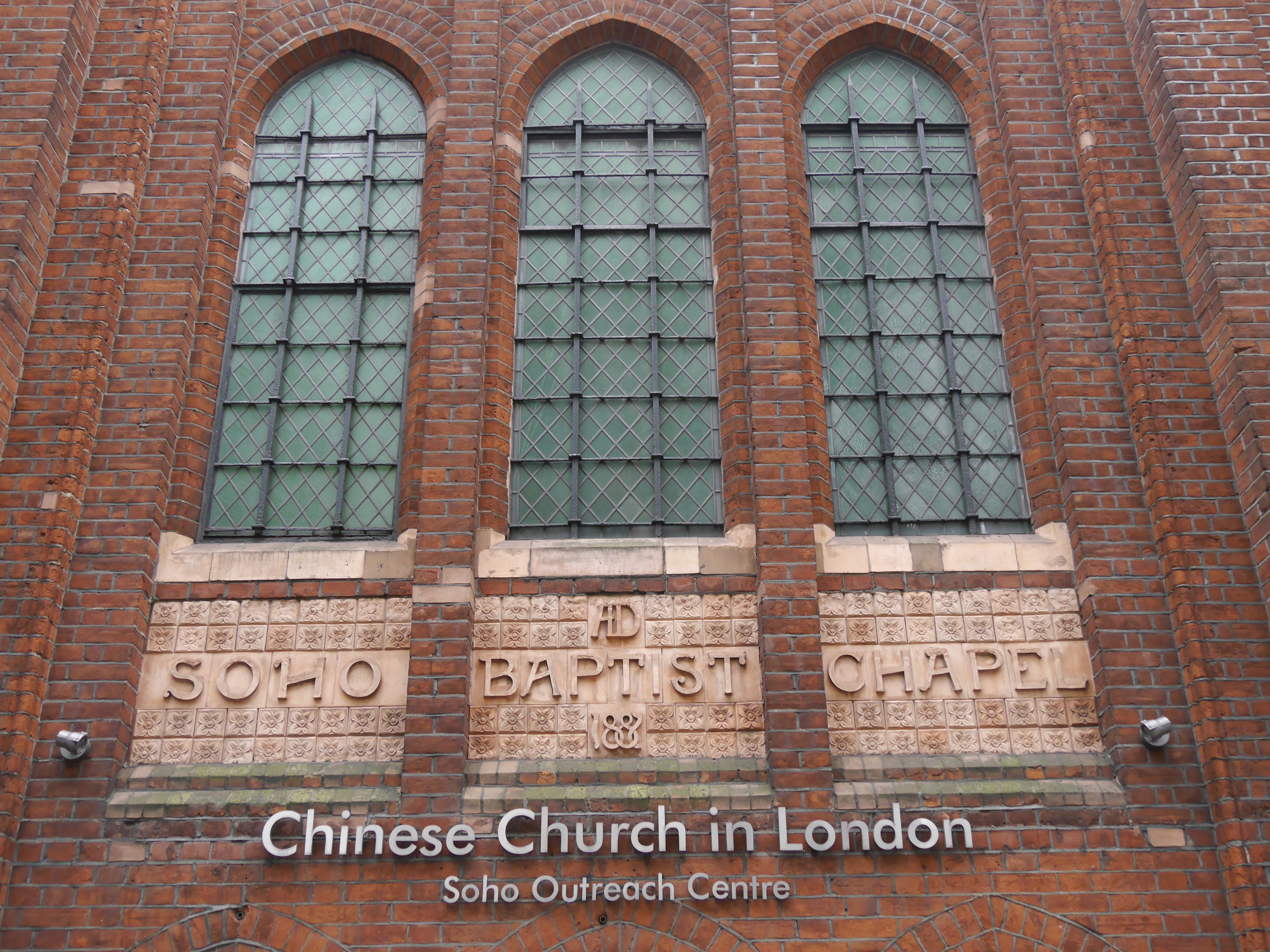
Soho Baptist Chapel (detail)

Soho Baptist Chapel is a church located at 166a Shaftesbury Avenue, London, on the corner of Mercer Street. It was originally a Baptist church, the community relocated to North Finchley and was renamed as High Road Baptist Church. The building is now known as the Chinese Church in London, a home for Chinese congregation.

== History ==
The church was built in 1887–88 to a design by the architect William Gillbee Scott for a Strict Baptist church community that had been formed in 1791. In 1916–17, it was sold to another Strict Baptist church, after their 99-year lease on a chapel in Gower Street came to an end, and became the Gower Street Memorial Chapel.

It is now the Chinese Church in London, Soho Outreach Centre.
