= Foulk Stapleford =

Former civil parish in Cheshire, England

Coordinates: 53.162°N 2.764°W

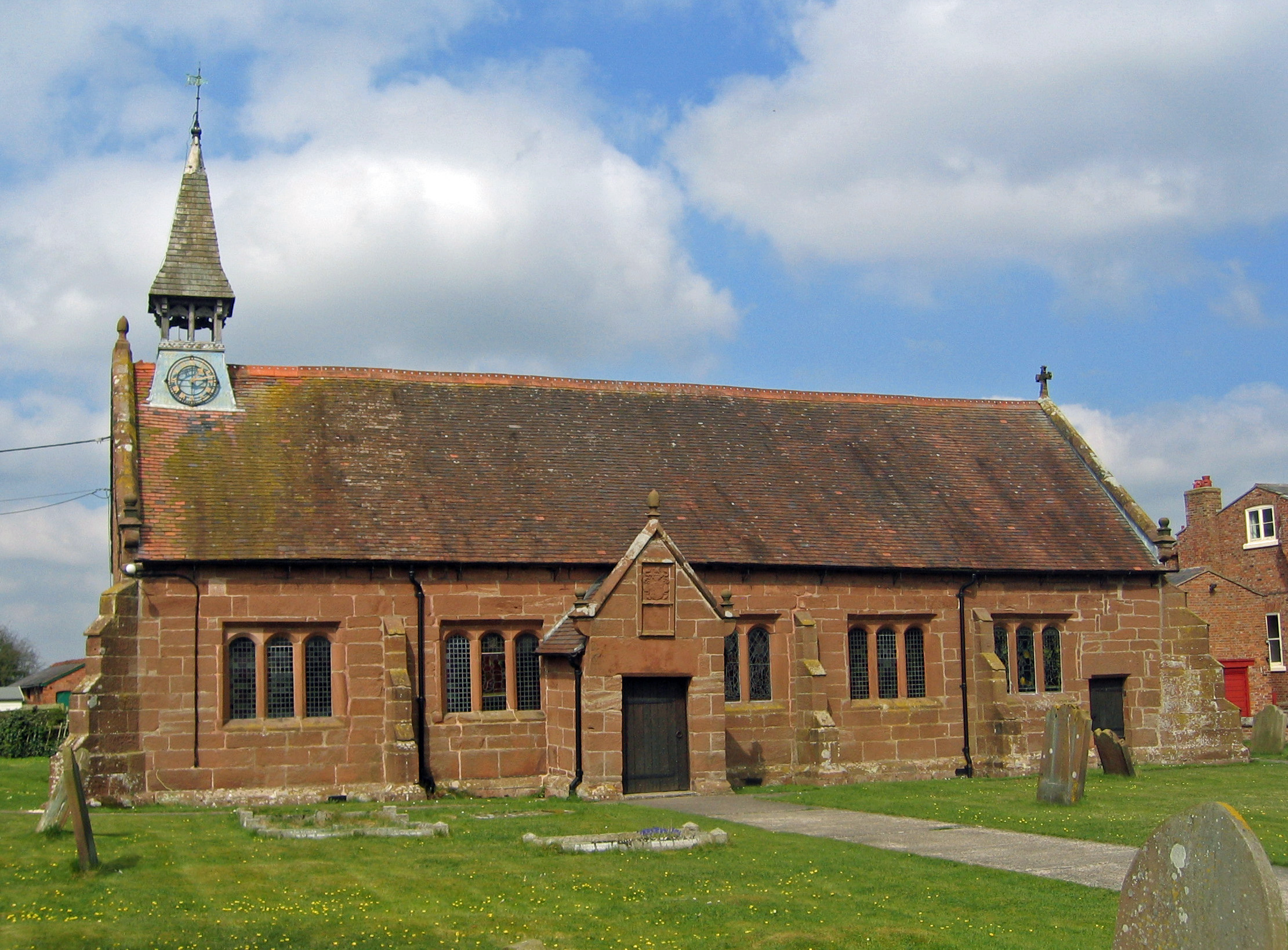
- St. Peter's Church, Hargrave

- Location within Cheshire
- Population: 161 (2011)
- Civil parish: Hargrave and Huxley
- Unitary authority: Cheshire West and Chester
- Ceremonial county: Cheshire
- Region: North West
- Country: England
- Sovereign state: United Kingdom
- Post town: CHESTER
- Postcode district: CH3
- Dialling code: 01829
- Police: Cheshire
- Fire: Cheshire
- Ambulance: North West
- UK Parliament: Chester South and Eddisbury

Foulk Stapleford is a former civil parish, now in the parish of Hargrave and Huxley, in the unitary authority of Cheshire West and Chester and the ceremonial county of Cheshire, England. The population of the civil parish as taken at the 2011 census was 161. Foulk-Stapleford was formerly a township in the parish of Tarvin, in 1866 Foulk Stapleford became a separate civil parish, on 1 April 2015 the parish was abolished to form Hargrave and Huxley.

It contained the village of Hargrave. St Peter's Church, Hargrave is a Grade II* listed building.

== See also ==
- Listed buildings in Foulk Stapleford
