= Thomas Moulson =

Sir Thomas Moulson (sometimes spelled "Mowlson") (c. 1568–1638), an alderman and member of the Grocers' Company, was a Sheriff of London in 1624 and Lord Mayor of London in 1634. He represented the City of London as a Member of Parliament in 1628.

Sir Thomas was a native of Hargrave, Cheshire, and in 1627 built a combined chapel and school in the village which is now St Peter's Church, Hargrave. He also set up a trust to maintain the chapel and school.

His wife, Lady Anne Moulson (née Radcliffe; 1576–1661), was commemorated in 1894 by the name of Radcliffe College. One of their grandsons, John Kendrick, became Lord Mayor of London (1651).

== Notes ==
Civic offices
Preceded by Ralph Freeman	Lord Mayor of London; 1634	Succeeded by Robert Parkhurst
