= Higher Huxley Hall =

- Location within Cheshire

General information
- Architectural style: Manor house
- Location: Huxley, Cheshire, England
- Coordinates: 53°8′51″N 2°45′8″W
- Completed: 13th century

Higher Huxley Hall was a manor house, later a luxury 5-star hotel, in Cheshire, England, located about 7 miles southeast of Chester. It lies west of the village of Huxley. Lower Huxley Hall lies less than half a mile to the immediate north of the hall. It dates from at least the 13th century and today has a white facade. Once in the possession of the Cholmondeley family, in 1850 it was owned by a Mr. R. Salmon. However, in 1896 it was reportedly in the hands of a Mr. Vere Cholmondeley.
