= St Peter's Church, Hargrave =

Coordinates: 53.1545°N 2.7710°W

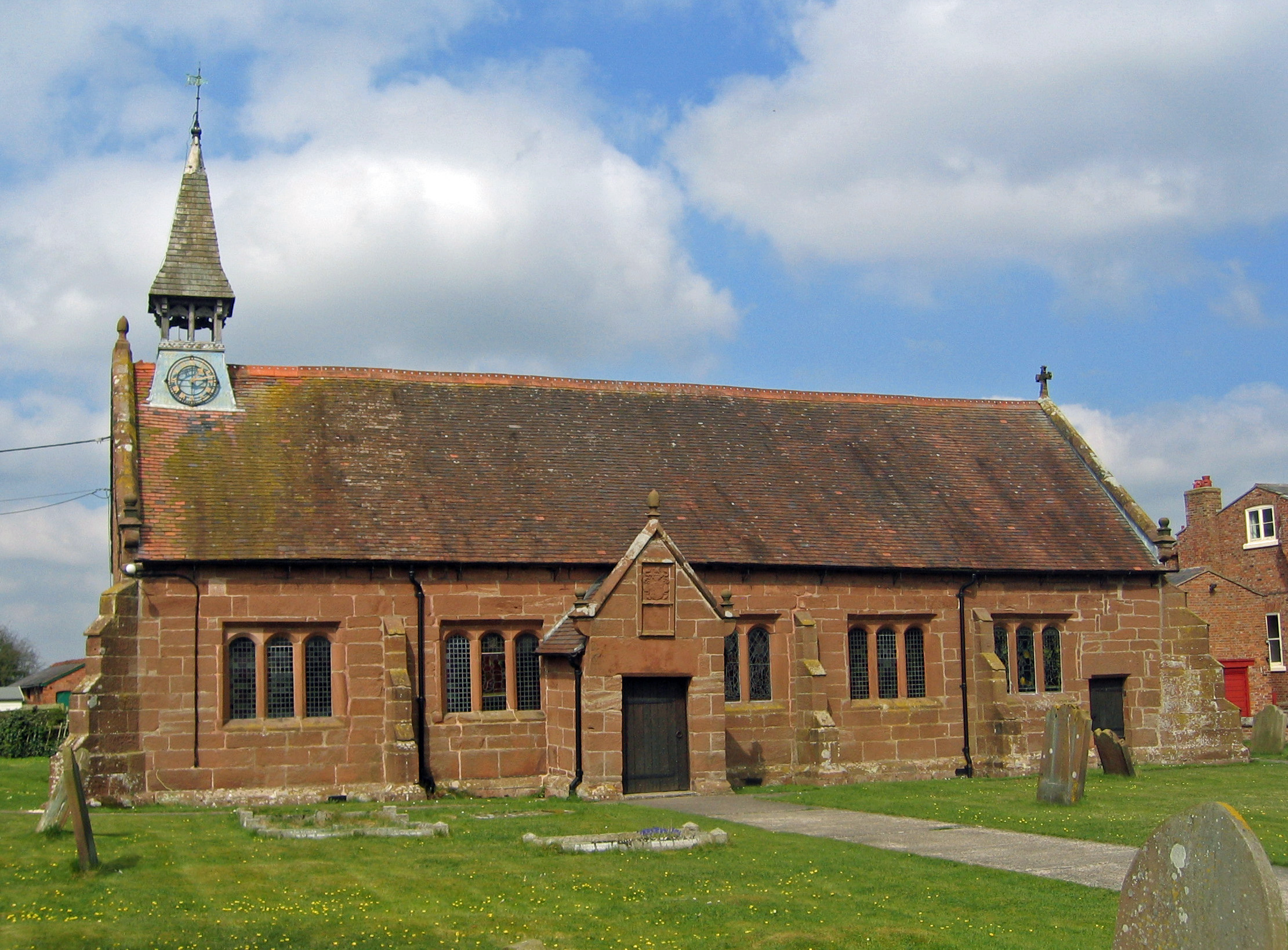
- St Peter's Church, Hargrave, from the south

- Location in Cheshire
- OS grid reference: SJ 485,622
- Location: Hargrave, Cheshire
- Country: England
- Denomination: Anglican
- Website: https://www.stpetershargrave.org.uk/

History
- Status: Parish church
- Dedication: Saint Peter

Architecture
- Functional status: Active
- Heritage designation: Grade II*
- Designated: 1 March 1967
- Architect: John Douglas
- Architectural type: Combined chapel and school
- Groundbreaking: 1627
- Completed: 1890

Specifications
- Materials: Ashlar red sandstone Red tile roof

Administration
- Province: York
- Diocese: Chester
- Archdeaconry: Chester
- Deanery: Malpas
- Parish: St Peter, Hargrave

Clergy
- Vicar: Revd Paul Beynon Barrow

St Peter's Church is in the village of Hargrave, Cheshire, England. It is recorded in the National Heritage List for England as a designated Grade II* listed building, and an active Anglican parish church in the diocese of Chester, the archdeaconry of Chester and the deanery of Malpas.

== History ==
The church was built in 1627 as a combined chapel and school by Thomas Moulson, a former native of the village. He had moved to London and become a master grocer. He was Member of Parliament for the City of London in 1628 and Lord Mayor of London in 1634. Shortly before his death in 1638, he set up a trust to maintain the church and the school. In 1812 its use as a school ended. As the state of the church had become neglected, a considerable restoration was carried out between 1878 and 1890, the first Duke of Westminster contributing £200 of the total cost of £600. This restoration, with the addition of a vestry, is attributed to John Douglas. In 1878 it became the parish church for a new ecclesiastical parish called 'St Peter, Hargrave', covering the two townships of Foulk Stapleford from the parish of Tarvin (which included Hargrave) and Huxley from the parish of Waverton.

== Architecture ==
=== Exterior ===
The church is built of ashlar red sandstone with a red tile roof. Its plan consists of a five-bay nave and chancel in one range, a vestry and a south porch. At the west end is a bell turret with one bell and a clock on the south and west faces. The windows are square-headed and transomed. The porch has Jacobean stone ornaments and a 1774 panel containing the coat of arms of the Moulson family and an inscription relating to the founding by Thomas.

=== Interior ===
The hammerbeam roof of 1774 survived the restoration, but all the old fittings and furniture were disposed of, except for the octagonal font. The parish registers begin in 1631. The reredos was designed by John Douglas.

== External features ==
In the churchyard, south-east of the church, are two war graves of soldiers of World War I.

== See also ==
- Listed buildings in Foulk Stapleford
- List of church restorations, amendments and furniture by John Douglas
