= Woodgrange Park Cemetery =

Place of burial in East London, England

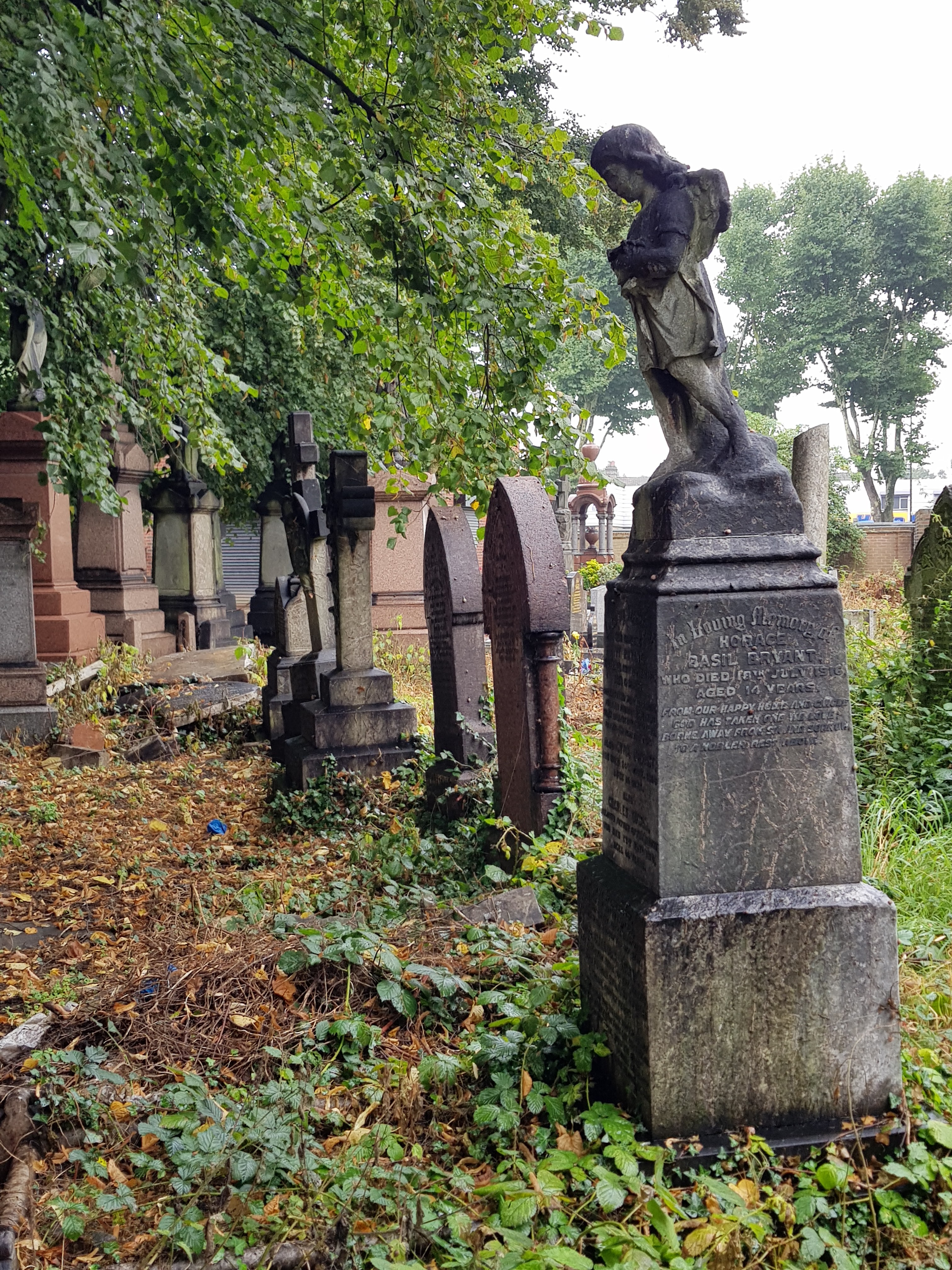
- Interactive map of Woodgrange Park Cemetery

Details
- Established: 12 February 1889; 137 years ago
- Location: London
- Country: England
- Coordinates: 51°32′52″N 0°02′36″E
- Website: www.woodgrangeparkcemetery.co.uk

Woodgrange Park Cemetery is a private cemetery in London, England.

== History ==
It opened on 12 February 1889. The cemetery was opposed in the House of Commons by the local MP, James Theobald, because of the proximity of the City of London Cemetery and Crematorium and the Manor Park Cemetery and Crematorium. It was built on land owned by Robert Gascoyne-Cecil, 3rd Marquess of Salisbury. The architect of the chapel and entrance lodge was William Gillbee Scott.

1889 sketch of the chapel in The Architect journal
