= Ralph Freeman (Lord Mayor) =

English merchant

Ralph Freeman (died 16 March 1634) was an English merchant who was Lord Mayor of London in 1633.

== Life and career ==
Freeman was a city of London merchant and a member of the Worshipful Company of Clothworkers. He was on the committee of the East India Company from 1608 to 1611 and from 1612 to 1615. From 1613 to 1615 he was an auditor of the City and served as one of the Court of Assistants of the Levant Company from 1614 to 1615 and from 1616 to 1623. He was a member of the committee of the East India Company from 1617 to 1619. In 1620 he was elected Sheriff of London but did not serve immediately. He was also Master of the Clothworkers Company in 1620 and on the committee of the East India Company from 1622 to 1623. On 12 November 1622, he was elected an alderman of the City of London for Bishopsgate ward. He was Sheriff of London from 1623 to 1624. In 1633 he became alderman for Cornhill ward and in 1633, he was elected Lord Mayor of London.

Freeman married Joan Crouch, a daughter of John Crouch of Layston. They had several children but lost at least four sons from 1598 onwards. By the time of his wife’s death in 1615, he was left with just one daughter, Jane who married George Sondes, 1st Earl of Feversham in 1620. She died in 1637 leaving two sons, George and Freeman. Tragedy struck the family in 1655 when Freeman, then a youth of nineteen, murdered George, apparently simply out of jealousy, and was hanged for the murder.

Sir Ralph was Lord of the Manor of Aspenden, Hertfordshire.

Civic offices
Preceded by Sir Nicholas Rainton	Lord Mayor of the City of London; 1633	Succeeded by Sir Thomas Moulson
