= Nicholas Rainton =

English merchant

Sir Nicholas Rainton (1569–19 August 1646) was an English merchant who was Lord Mayor of London in 1632. His home, Forty Hall in Enfield, is preserved as a museum.

== Life ==
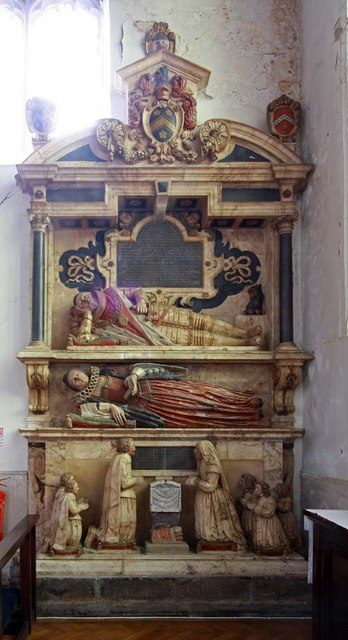
Monument to Sir Nicholas Rainton in St Andrew's Church, Enfield

He was the third son of Robert Rainton of Heighington, Lincolnshire and was baptised in the parish of Washingborough on 10 June 1569. On 16 November 1602 he married Rebecca Moulson at the church of St Christopher le Stocks in the City of London.

Rainton was a City of London merchant, a member of the Worshipful Company of Haberdashers and was elected Sheriff of London in 1617 - a position which was not taken up immediately. On 22 June 1621 he was elected an alderman of the City of London for Tower ward. He served as Sheriff of London from 1621 to 1622 and as Master of the Haberdashers Company from 1622 to 1623. In 1632, he was elected Lord Mayor of London and was Master of the Haberdashers Company again from 1632 to 1633. He was knighted on 5 May 1633. In 1634 he became alderman for Cornhill and president of St Bartholomew's Hospital until his death.

In 1616 Rainton bought the manor of Worcesters at Enfield in Middlesex from the Cecil family, and in 1629 began the construction of a house, Forty Hall, on the estate. It survives and is preserved as a museum.

Rainton was imprisoned in the Tower of London in May 1640 with three other aldermen - John Gayre, Thomas Soame and Thomas Atkins - for refusing to list the inhabitants of his ward who were able to contribute £50 or more to a loan for King Charles.

He died at Forty Hall in 1646 and was buried at St Andrew's Church in Enfield Town, where there is an elaborate monument to him and his wife, who died in 1640. He left his estate to his great-nephew Nicholas. There are two versions of a portrait of Rainton: one at Forty Hall, the other at St Bartholomew's Hospital.

Civic offices
Preceded by Sir George Whitmore	Lord Mayor of the City of London; 1632	Succeeded by Sir Ralph Freeman
