= Huxley, Cheshire =

Village in Cheshire, England

Coordinates: 53.14748°N 2.73258°W

Huxley
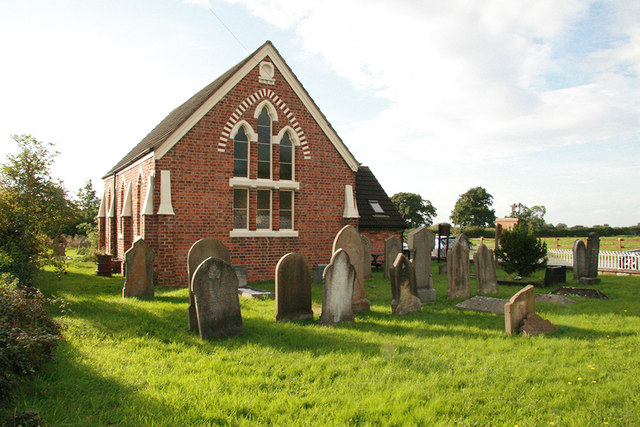
- Huxley Chapel

- Location within Cheshire
- Population: 251 (2011)
- OS grid reference: SJ510614
- Civil parish: Hargrave and Huxley
- Unitary authority: Cheshire West and Chester
- Ceremonial county: Cheshire
- Region: North West
- Country: England
- Sovereign state: United Kingdom
- Post town: CHESTER
- Postcode district: CH3
- Dialling code: 01829
- Police: Cheshire
- Fire: Cheshire
- Ambulance: North West
- UK Parliament: Chester South and Eddisbury

Huxley is a small rural village and former civil parish, now in the parish of Hargrave and Huxley, in the Cheshire West and Chester district, and ceremonial county of Cheshire in England. In 2001 the parish had a population of 220, increasing to 251 at the 2011 Census. The civil parish was abolished in 2015

It is home to Huxley Primary School.

== Governance ==
Huxley was formerly a township in the parish of Waverton, in 1866 Huxley became a civil parish. On 1 April 2015 the parish was abolished to form "Hargrave and Huxley" and Tattenhall and District.

== See also ==
- Listed buildings in Huxley, Cheshire
- Lower Huxley Hall
- Higher Huxley Hall
