= William Gillbee Scott =

English architect

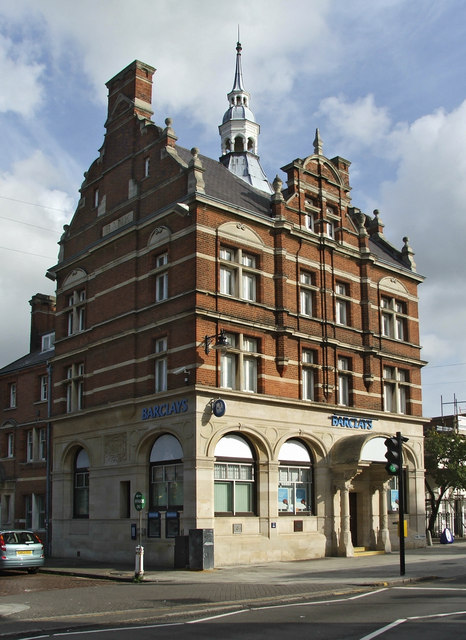
Barclays Bank, Enfield

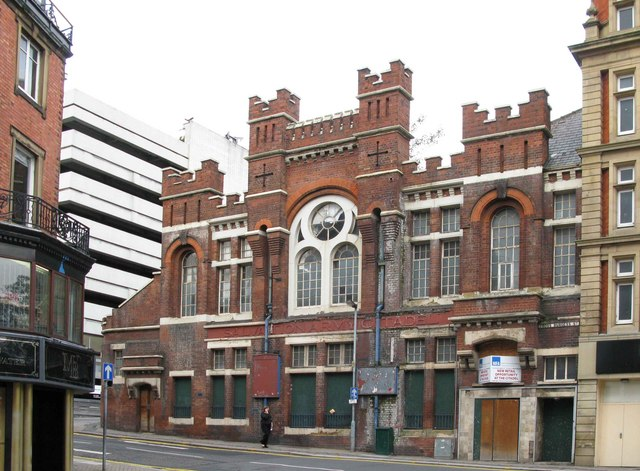
The Salvation Army Citadel, Sheffield.

William Gillbee Scott, sometimes William Gilbee Scott, (1857-1930) was an English architect who designed the Gower Street Memorial Chapel (now the Chinese Church in London), the Salvation Army Citadel in Sheffield, and the London and Provincial Bank in Enfield (now Barclays Bank).

== Early life ==
William Gillbee Scott was born in 1857.

== Career ==
One of Scott's first designs was the Gower Street Memorial Chapel, now known as the Chinese Church in London, which was built in 1887–88. He also designed a brick Gothic chapel at the Woodgrange Park Cemetery (1888) which was demolished in 2006 after it fell into disrepair and was damaged by a fire.

In 1889, he renovated All Saints Church, Edmonton, and in 1892 he designed the Salvation Army Citadel in Sheffield which is a grade II listed building with Historic England.

He designed the grade II listed London and Provincial Bank in The Town, Enfield, now Barclays Bank, built 1897 in the Flemish Renaissance style. The builder was Alan Fairhead. He also designed the public swimming baths at Edmonton which were built 1900 but have since been replaced. In 1899–1900 he designed Holy Trinity Church in Horsham, West Sussex.

Scott lived in Harden House, Waverley Road, Enfield, and had offices at 25 Bedford Row, London. He was a fellow of the Royal Institute of British Architects.

== Death and legacy ==
Scott died in 1930.
