= Hargrave and Huxley =

Civil parish in Cheshire, England

Coordinates: 53.15480°N 2.77172°W

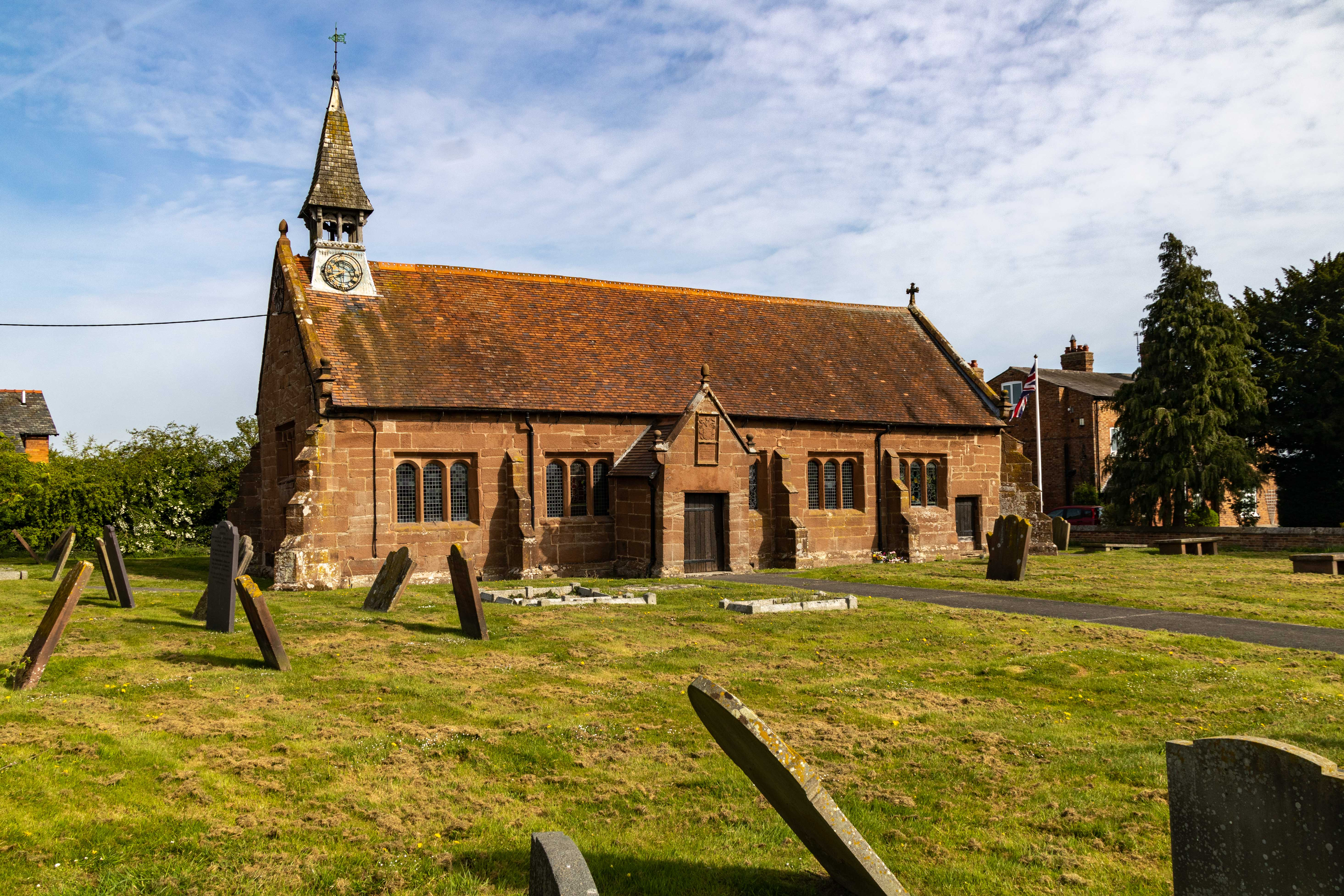
- St Peter's Church, Hargrave

- Location within Cheshire
- Population: 655 (2021 census)
- Civil parish: Hargrave and Huxley
- Unitary authority: Cheshire West and Chester
- Ceremonial county: Cheshire
- Region: North West
- Country: England
- Sovereign state: United Kingdom
- UK Parliament: Chester South and Eddisbury
- Website: Parish Council

Hargrave and Huxley is a civil parish in the Cheshire West and Chester borough of Cheshire, England, covering the villages of Hargrave, Huxley, and surrounding rural areas. The parish had a population of 655 at the 2021 census.

== History ==
The parish was created in 2015, covering the combined area of the three abolished parishes of Foulk Stapleford (in which Hargrave was the main settlement), Hatton, and Huxley, subject to some alterations to the boundaries with neighbouring parishes.

== Governance ==
There are two tiers of local government covering Hargrave and Huxley, at parish and unitary authority level: Hargrave and Huxley Parish Council, and Cheshire West and Chester Council. The parish council generally meets alternately at Hargrave Village Hall and Huxley Village Hall.
