= Old Vestry Office, Enfield =

Building in Enfield, London, England

Coordinates: 51°39′08″N 0°04′54″W

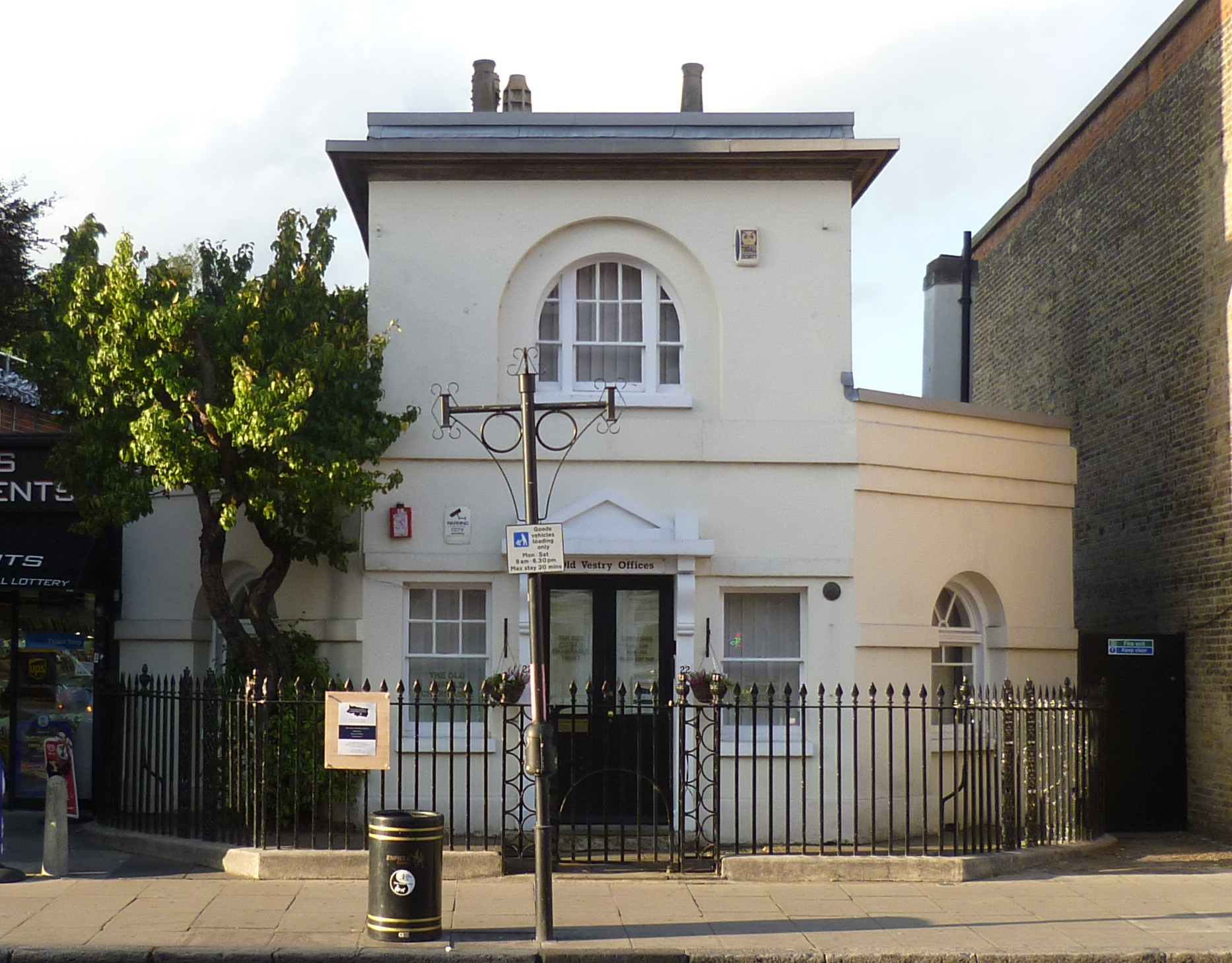
Old Vestry Office

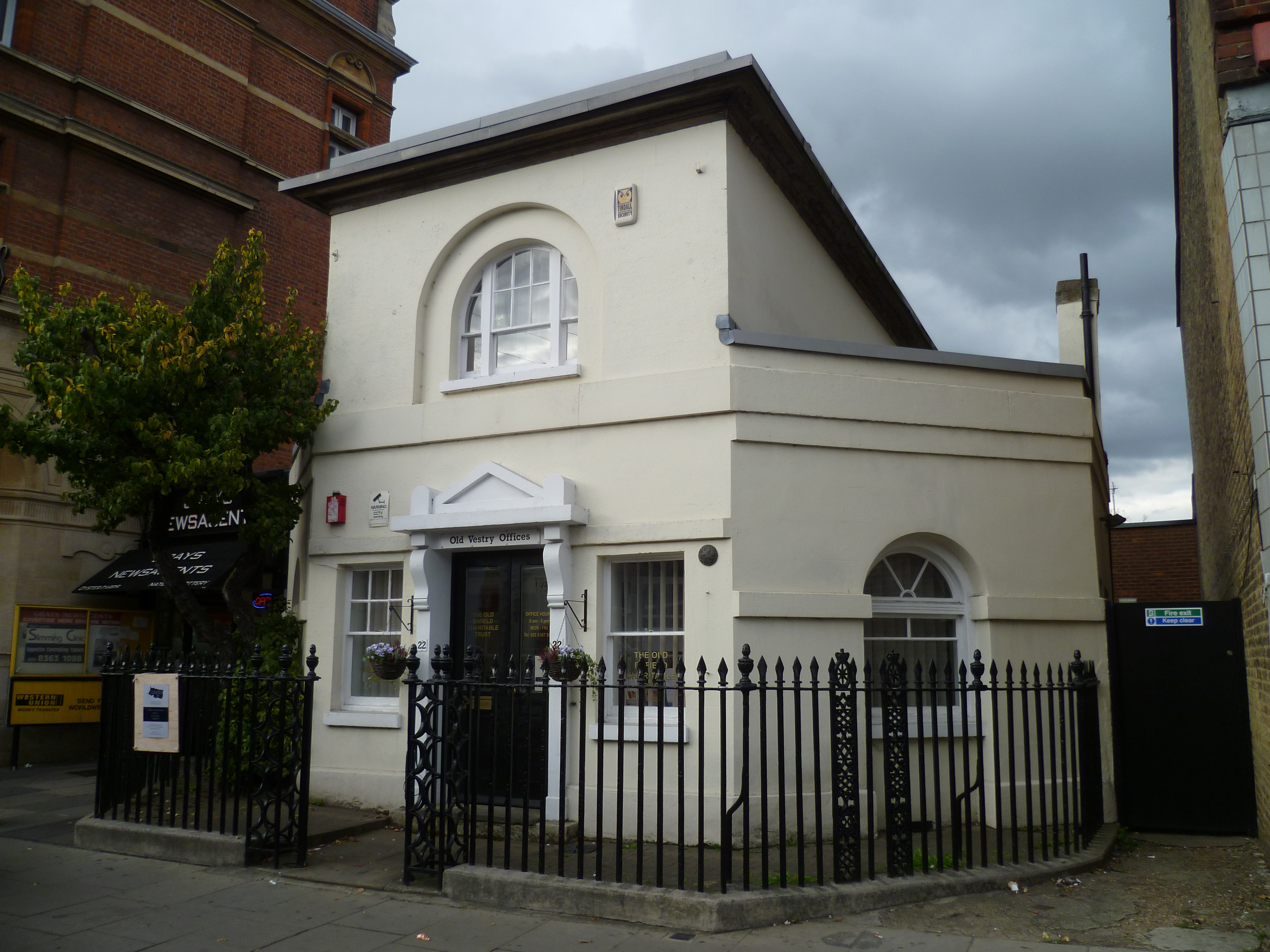
Old Vestry Office

The Old Vestry Office is a grade II listed building at 22 The Town, Enfield, London.

== History ==
The present-day Enfield Vestry Office was built between 1800 and 1830. Hexagonal in shape, it was built as a residence for the parish beadle (parish constable) who was responsible for assisting with services in the parish church on Sundays, Good Friday, and other special occasions. The beadle also attended the Vestry meetings and performed duties as instructed, including the supervision of law and order, overseeing poor relief and ensuring any orders of the Vestry were carried out.

The building also served as a watch-house, a base for night-watchmen, with two cells for holding suspects before they appeared before a magistrate. After the passing into law of the County Police Act 1839 professional county police forces began to be established, replacing many of the beadle's duties, and so from 1840–70 the building became Enfield's first police station.

== Present-day use ==
Im more recent years the building has been home to The Enfield Charity (also known as The Enfield Trust and as The Old Enfield Trust), which has a history spanning at least 700 years. The charity's origins lie in the setting-up and administration of Enfield's market, established under King Edward I in 1303. Now, in addition to the running of Enfield market the charity's purpose also includes the prevention/relief of poverty, education/training, accommodation/housing, and amateur sport, all primarily for residents in the EN1, EN2, and EN3 areas.
