= St Andrew's Enfield =

Coordinates: 51.653°N 0.082°W

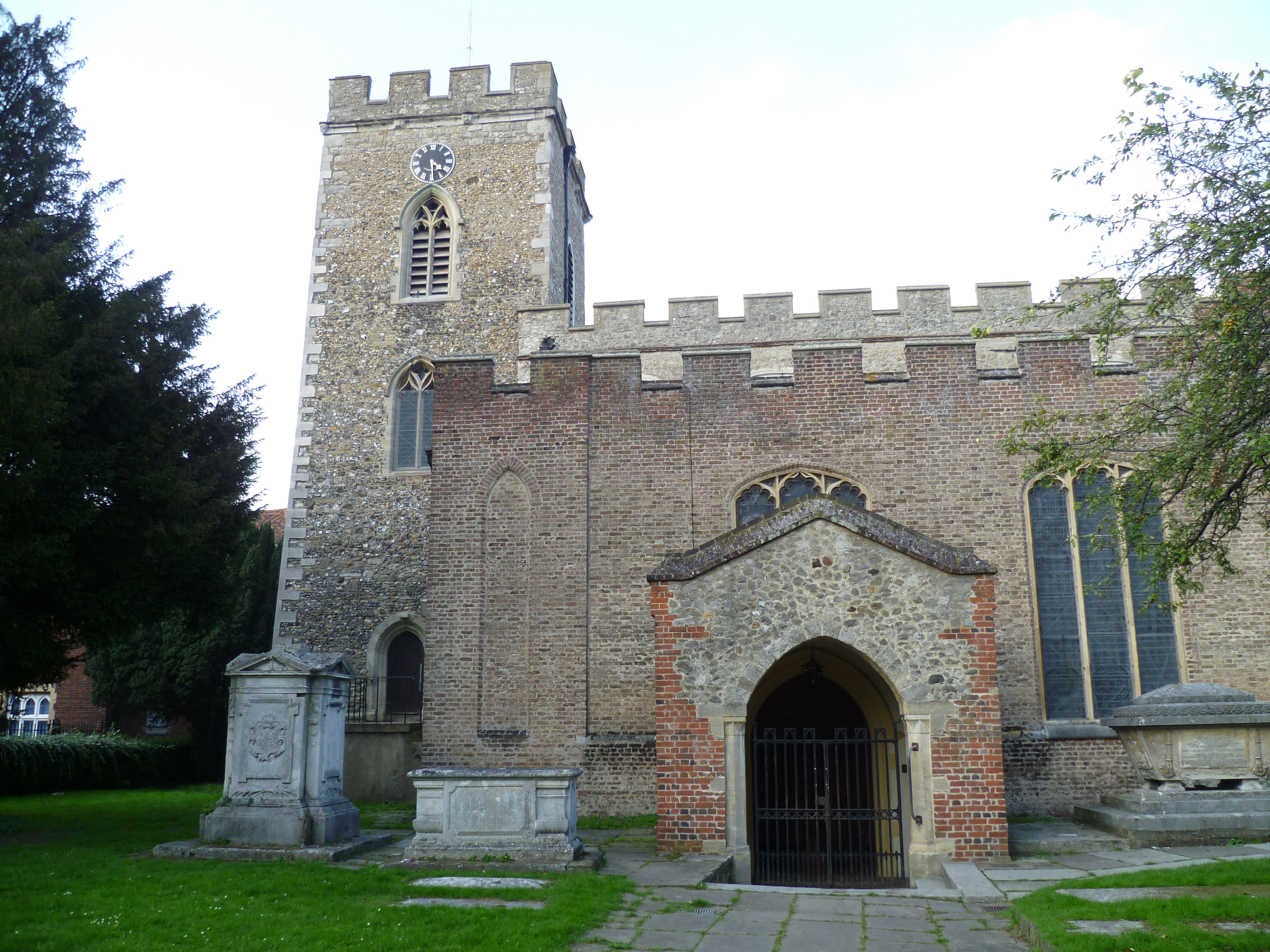
- St Andrew's Enfield
- St Andrew's Enfield
- Country: England
- Denomination: Church of England
- Website: Official website

History
- Founded: before 1136

Architecture
- Heritage designation: Grade II*

Administration
- Diocese: London
- Archdeaconry: Hampstead
- Deanery: Enfield
- Parish: St Andrew's Enfield

Clergy
- Vicar: Steve Griffiths

St Andrew's Enfield is a Church of England church in Enfield, London, and the original parish church of Enfield. It is a grade II* listed building with Historic England.

== History ==
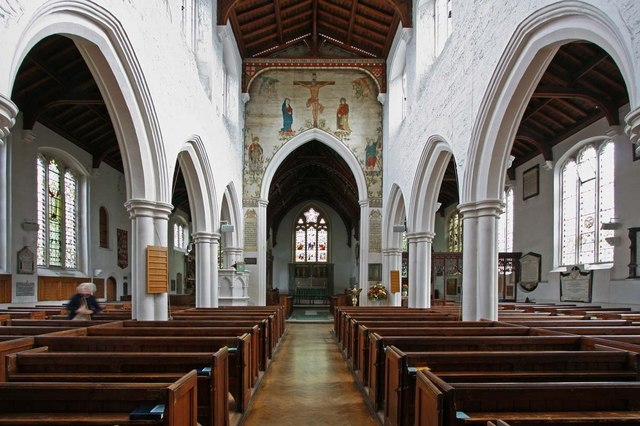
Interior of St Andrew's, Enfield

The first written evidence of there being a parish church in Enfield dates from 1136 when St Andrew's, along with a number of other neighbouring parishes, was endowed to the Monastery at Walden in Essex, now Saffron Walden. In 1190, Abbot Reginald of Walden appointed Robertus to serve as the first Vicar of Enfield.

The earliest known existing parts of St Andrew's date from the years immediately following the appointment of Robertus. Part of the east wall of the church and the south wall of the sanctuary date from this period, including the lancet-shaped unglazed window in the south wall of the sanctuary, opening today into the Artillery Chapel. Originally this south wall formed the external wall of the church and there are traces in this window aperture of the sockets for the iron framework of the glass.

The fourteenth century saw much restoration and major enlargements to the church, including the construction of the north and south aisles (although the south aisle was much lower than the north, being raised to its present height only in 1824). The church tower is also 14th century, although much restored and altered in later years. The arches in the nave date from this same period. The pitch pine pews were installed after much argument and dispute in 1853; the oak clergy and choir stalls in 1908 as a memorial to Prebendary Hodson, Vicar of Enfield from 1870 - 1904, and the painting over the chancel arch in 1923 as a memorial to the men of Enfield who died in the First World War.

Monuments in the church include an elaborate one of alabaster in memory of Sir Nicholas Rainton (d.1646), his wife and family.

A curious epitaph in the churchyard to Thomas Carter, who died in 1742, reads:

Wail not our fate, wail for thy own;
We rest in peace, while you drudge on.

== Gallery ==
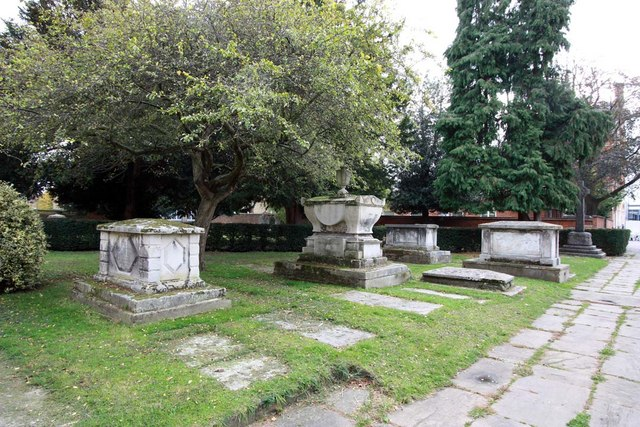
Churchyard

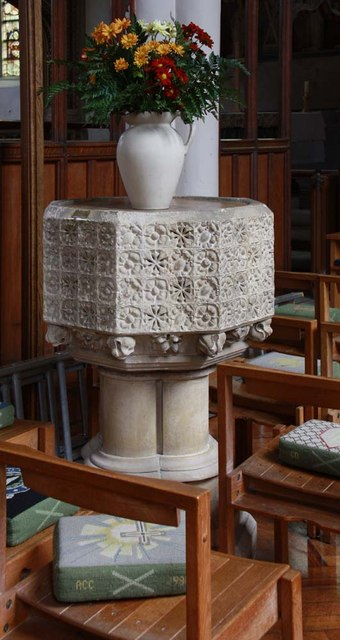
Baptismal font

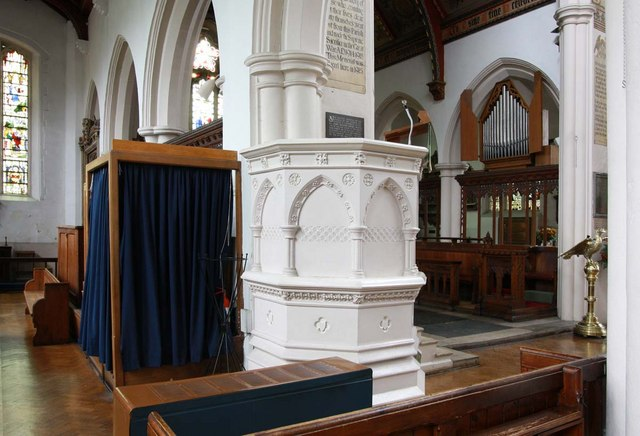
Pulpit

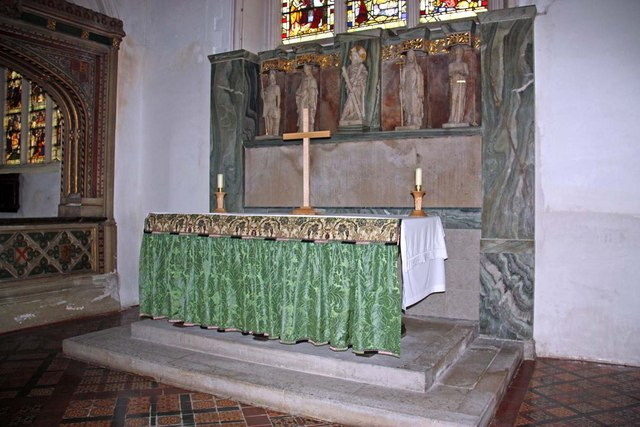
Altar

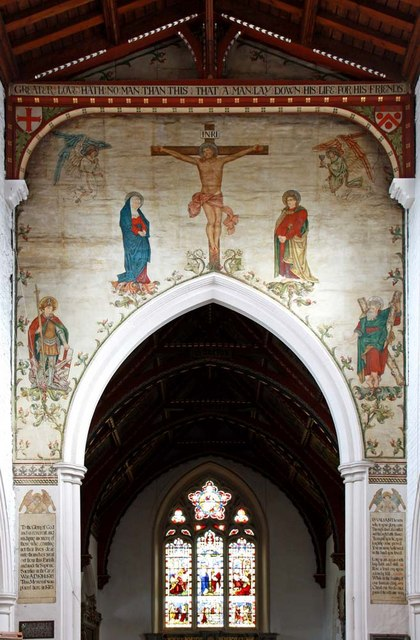
Wall painting (First World War memorial)

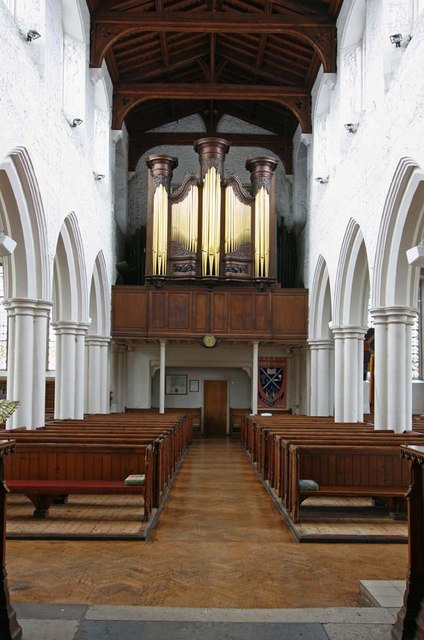
Organ
