= Hargrave, Cheshire =

Village in Cheshire, England

Coordinates: 53.15°N 2.766667°W

Hargrave
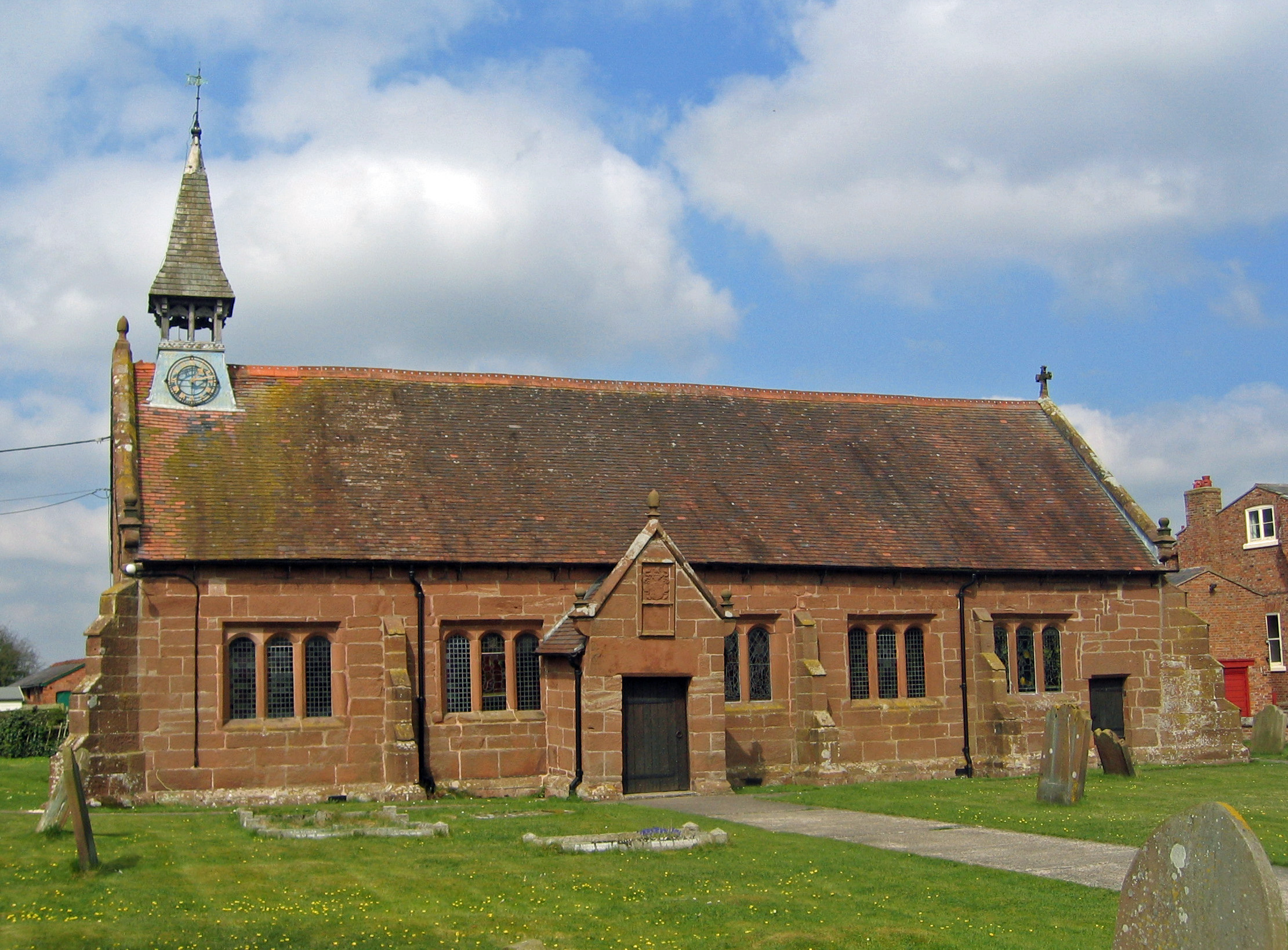
- St Peter's Church

- Location within Cheshire
- Civil parish: Hargrave and Huxley
- Unitary authority: Cheshire West and Chester
- Ceremonial county: Cheshire
- Region: North West
- Country: England
- Sovereign state: United Kingdom
- Post town: CHESTER
- Postcode district: CH3
- Dialling code: 01829
- Police: Cheshire
- Fire: Cheshire
- Ambulance: North West
- UK Parliament: Chester South and Eddisbury

Hargrave is a village in the civil parish of Hargrave and Huxley (before 2015, Foulk Stapleford), the unitary authority of Cheshire West and Chester, and the ceremonial county of Cheshire, England.

St Peter's Church, Hargrave is a Grade II* listed building.

The Shropshire Union Canal (originally Chester Canal) passes close to the village.
