= John Bruen =

English Puritan layman (1560–1625)

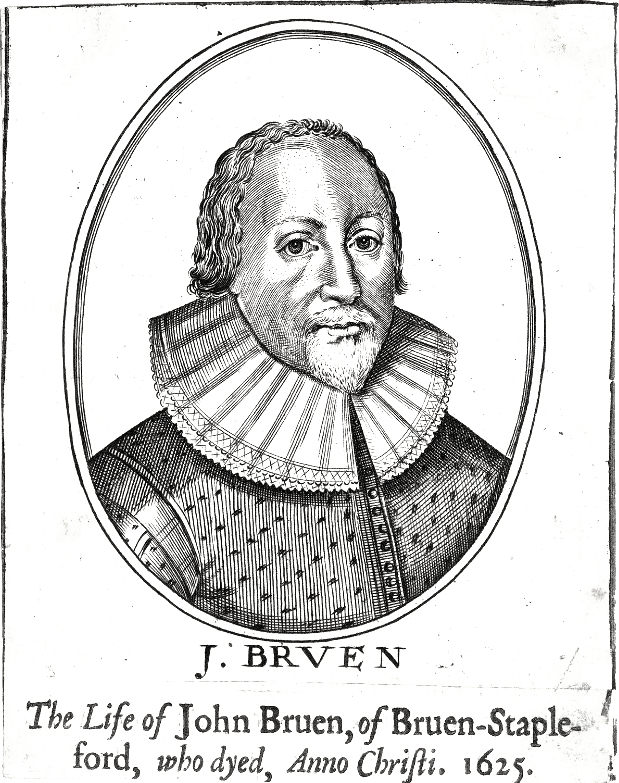
John Bruen

John Bruen (1560–1625) was an English Puritan layman, celebrated in his time for religious observances. He is now recognised as an iconoclast and an examplar of the godly Jacobean country squire.

== Early life ==
Bruen was the son of a Cheshire squire of the same name of Bruen Stapleford, a manor around 7.5 miles (12.1 km) south-east of Chester that remained in the Bruen or Bruyn family until 1715. His parish church was St Andrew's Church, Tarvin.

John Bruen the elder was three time married. His union with Anne, the sister of Sir John Done, was childless; but his second wife, Dorothy Holford, gave him 14 children. They included Katharine, who married William Brettargh, and John, the oldest surviving son, both noted for Puritan views.

John Bruen the younger was sent to his uncle Dutton at Dutton Hall, where for three years he was taught by the schoolmaster James Roe. There Bruen became an expert dancer. When aged about 17, John Bruen with his brother Thomas were sent as gentlemen-commoners to St. Alban Hall, Oxford, where they stayed about two years. A contemporary at St Alban Hall was John Brerewood (Brerewod) of Cheshire, credited with a steer towards to his later religious views. The Hinde memoir tradition identifies Brerewood as a son of a Chester alderman (i.e. Robert Brerewood who died in 1601); so that he was the brother John (c.1561–1599) of Edward Brerewood, and father of Robert Brerewood and Jane Ratcliffe.

Bruen left the university in 1579. He hunted, and with Ralph Done kept a pack of hounds.

== Head of a household ==
On the death of his father in 1587, Bruen had a household to support of his brothers and sisters, and his own children. He experienced at this period a Calvinist conversion, evidenced by the choice for his sons' names Calvin and Beza. He got rid of his dogs, killed the game, and disparked the land. His children were brought up strictly, and his servants were sober and pious. One of these, Robert Pashfield, had a leathern girdle, which served him as a memoria technica for the Bible, marked into portions for the books, with points and knots for the smaller divisions. The minister William Perkins is cited by Hinde calling Bruen Stapleford, "for the practice and power of religion, the very topsail of all England."

Bruen's habits are known from the memoir by Hinde. In summer he rose between three and four, and in winter at five, and read prayers twice a day. His own prayers were seven times daily. On Sundays he walked from his house, a mile distant, to the church at Tarvin, followed by most of his servants, and called on his tenants on the way, so that when he reached the church it was at the head of a procession. He rarely went home to dinner after morning prayers, but continued in the church till after the evening service. The long-term vicar of Tarvin from 1557 was Edward Bagshawe, a Cambridge graduate.

Bruen maintained a preacher at his own house. He nominated in 1622 the Tarvin parish priest Sabaoth Clarke (a number of variants of the name), an Oxford graduate and eventually an ejected minister of 1662.

Bruen became known as a good landlord and master to his servants. His second wife died c.1616. Bruen then broke up his household, with its 21 boarders, and retired to Chester. There he cleared the debt of his estate, saw some of his children settled, and maintained the poor of his parish by the produce of two mills in Stapleford, where he returned with his third wife, Margaret.

After an illness, Bruen died in 1625, at the age of 65. There was a portrait of him in Samuel Clarke's Marrow of Ecclesiastical History, later re-engraved for William Richardson.

=== Hospitality and boarders ===
Bruen kept a hospitable house, and was charitable to the poor of his neighbourhood and of Chester. The house became celebrated, and attracted visitors. Among those was the widowed Lady Egerton (née Elizabeth Venables of Kinderton), after the death in 1599 of her husband Sir Thomas Egerton.

Bruen had many young boarders, including sons of prominent Cheshire families such as the Egertons, Richard Grosvenor being one around 1595.

== Views ==
Of his upbringing, Bruen stated "At that time the holy Sabbaths of the Lord were wholly spent, in all places about us, in May-games and May-poles, pipings and dancings, for it was a rare thing to hear of a preacher, or to have one sermon in a year."

An iconoclast, Bruen had his servants smash stained glass in Tarvin Church, and deface the sculptured images, on May Day 1603. The views that led Bruen to iconoclasm in his local church were described by William Hinde, curate at nearby Bunbury, in his memoir of Bruen. The broken windows were replaced with plain glass. Bruen received for those acts a summons to appear before Bishop Richard Vaughan. As in the later case of Henry Sherfield, Bruen had gone outside the law by acting at his parish church without diocesan permission.

A decade later, members of Bruen's household removed churchyard stone crosses in the area, objecting to their Catholic connotations. A complaint was raised about damage at Tarvin, Christleton, Delamere Forest and Ecclestone Cross. Bruen and John Ratcliffe, husband of Jane Ratcliffe née Brerewood, were prosecuted, with the matter was taken to the Star Chamber. Fines were levied on the household.

The Dutton family had by charter the control of the minstrels of the county. Bruen had his relation Thomas Dutton (1569–1614) agree to limit licenses with Sabbath observance on Sunday. He also restricted the Tarvin Wakes week holiday around St Andrew's Day, by bringing in preachers to occupy the church, from opposition to saint's day celebration and associated rowdiness.

Bruen had an implicit belief in special providences, "judgments", and witchcraft. He refused to drink healths even at the high sheriff's feast. Towards the end of his life his prayers were twice accompanied by "ravishing sights".

== Family ==
In 1580, Bruen married a widow, Elizabeth Cowper (1552–1595/6), previously married to John Cowper, alderman of Chester. Her father was Henry Hardware, who had twice been mayor of Chester and opposed mystery plays. Her brother Henry the younger, who in early life had boarded with the Bruens, was mayor in 1599, and closed the bullring, also banning the baiting of bulls and bears, all plays, and the dragon with naked boys traditional in the pageant of the Chester Show.

Elizabeth died suddenly, and after a time Bruen married Ann Fox, whom he first met at a religious meeting in Manchester. For a year they lived at her mother's house at Rhodes, near Manchester. He then returned to Stapleford, and again his house had visitors from the gentry. Ann died c.1616 and Bruen then spent a number of years in Chester.

In total, Bruen was married three times and had 11 children. He was survived by his third wife Margaret.

Among the Harleian MSS. is the petition of his son, Calvin Bruen, of Chester, a mercer, respecting the treatment he received for visiting William Prynne when he was taken through Chester to imprisonment at Carnarvon Castle, and actions of John Bridgeman, bishop of Chester. A former mayor, Calvin Bruen was one of the "Chester men" who were a target for Archbishop Laud, and it has been presumed that his father's "godly" reputation played a part in that.

== Legacy ==
Also in the Harleian MSS. is a compilation by Bruen entitled "A godly profitable collection of divers sentences out of Holy Scripture, and variety of matter out of several divine authors." These writings are commonly called his cards, and are 52 in number.

== Biographers ==
William Hinde (died 1629) wrote a biographical memoir of John Bruen that was published by his son Samuel Hinde, then rector of Standish and chaplain to James Stanley, Lord Strange, in 1641. An abbreviated form of the long original title is A Faithfull Remonstrance of the Holy Life and Happy Death of John Bruen of Bruen-Stapleford.

William Hinde was related by marriage, his wife Margaret being the sister of Bruen's second wife Ann. He described Bruen's household as "a little Bethel", and Walsham comments on how Bruen's governance of the home, as related by Hinde, an "examplary regime", bears an "uncanny resemblance" to "prescriptive texts". An abridged edition of Hinde's work was published in 1799 as The Very Singular Life of John Bruen Esquire, of Bruen Stapleford, Cheshire, with a New York edition in 1857.

Bruen's life attracted later attention. He was included in William Urwick the younger's Historical Sketches of Nonconformity in the County Palatine of Chester (1864) and in George Ormerod’s History of the County Palatine and City of Chester (1882). He was noted as a model puritan by Robert Halley in Lancashire: its Puritanism and Nonconformity (1869).
