= James Crawfoot =

James Crawfoot (c.1759 – 23 January 1839) (also spelled Crowfoot, Crofoot, Crawford) was the leader of the 'Magic Methodists' or 'Forest Methodists' who influenced Hugh Bourne and William Clowes, the founders of Primitive Methodism.

== Background and family ==
Crawfoot was baptised in Tarvin, Cheshire, on 1 July 1759, the youngest of nine known children of Thomas Crawfoot (b. c.1719) and Ann (née Brownbill alias Prince) (c.1716 – c.1784), both Anglican adherents. He claimed never to have known his birth date but was more acquainted with the date of his 'second birth' (his conversion to Methodism). He married Phoebe Billington (c.1759 – 1807) on 27 August 1780 in Tarvin and they had seven known children together:

1. Samuel; bap. 7 March 1781, Tarvin
2. Ann; bap. 15 February 1784, Tarvin
3. Martha; (c.1786 – September 1786); bap. 17 September 1786, Tarvin; bur. 30 September 1786, Tarvin
4. James; bap. 9 December 1787, Tarvin
5. Martha; bap. 11 April 1790, Tarvin
6. Elizabeth; bap. 12 April 1795, Tarvin
7. Joseph; (c.1799 – 1885); bap. 10 March 1799, Tarvin; m. Priscilla Chambers (c.1797 – 1878); d. 11 March 1885

On 12 October 1807, James' wife Phoebe died aged 48 and was buried two days later.

On 3 January 1816, he married Hannah Mountford (c.1784 – 1840), a long-time servant of Mrs James Bourne. A rift arose between James and Hugh Bourne following James' marriage to Hannah after Bourne proposed to her at a class meeting but she refused due to the 'peculiarities of the proposal'. James and Hannah had one known child:

1. Sarah; bap. 6 October 1816, Tarvin

Crawfoot died suddenly on 23 January 1839 whilst walking through a field and is buried in a table tomb in the south-west corner of the churchyard of St Andrew's Church, Tarvin, along with his two wives Phoebe and Hannah, his son Joseph, and his daughter-in-law Priscilla. Passers-by witnessed him shouting "Glory! Glory!! Glory!!!" shortly before he fell to the ground. His last words were "Bless Jesus".

== Methodism ==
Crawfoot had a conversion experience "On the 7th of February, at two o'clock on Sabbath morning, in the year 1783, and in the twenty-fifth year of [his] age..." He immediately united himself with the ‘despised’ Methodists of the Chester circuit and became a local preacher.

He regularly went to Chester to hear John Wesley preach, including the last time that Wesley visited in 1790. He recalled Wesley's last words to the ministers and local preachers in the area after that service. “Fellow labourers, wherever there is an open door enter it and preach the Gospel: if it be two or three under a hedge or a tree – preach the Gospel.”

In around 1793, he moved from Duddon to Bryn (now a part of Cuddington), onto an isolated plot of cleared land, which he had leased in the forest glades of Delamere. Through his influence, a Methodist society was formed and a chapel erected at Bryn. This was known as the 'Forest Chapel' and was part of the Northwich circuit.

Crawfoot began a monthly service on a Saturday evening at his home for "the promotion of spiritual life". The attendees became known as the 'Forest Methodists'. It was a common occurrence, in the midst of these services, for persons to pass into a state of trance and have visions. Such behavior drew attention and controversy. The frequenters of these services became widely known as 'Magic Methodists'.
