= Listed buildings in Tarvin =

Tarvin is a civil parish in Cheshire West and Chester, England. It contains 27 buildings that are recorded in the National Heritage List for England as designated listed buildings. Of these, one is listed at Grade I, the highest grade, two are listed at Grade II*, the middle grade, and the others are at Grade II. The parish contains the village of Tarvin, and is otherwise rural. The listed buildings include the village church and structures in the churchyard, houses, cottages, a shop, a war memorial, and a public house. Outside the village they are houses and farmhouses.

== Key ==
Grade	Criteria
I	Buildings of exceptional interest, sometimes considered to be internationally important
II*	Particularly important buildings of more than special interest
II	Buildings of national importance and special interest

== Buildings ==
Name and location	Photograph	Date	Notes	Grade
St Andrew's Church; 53.1974°N 2.7620°W		Late 14th century	The oldest parts of the church are the nave and the south aisle. The tower and north aisle date from the 15th century, and the chancel from the 18th century. There were further renovations and alterations in the 19th century, and in 1908 by F. P. Oakley. The church is built in red sandstone with a Welsh slate roof. It contains a variety of architectural styles. Entry to the church is through the west wall of the west tower, which has an embattled parapet.	I
Church Cottages; 53.1975°N 2.7629°W		Early 16th century	Originating as a farmhouse, it was later converted into a house. There were extensive alterations in the 20th century. The building is timber-framed on a plinth with a brick chimney. It is in one storey with an attic, and has a four-bay front. The windows are 20th-century casements, those in the attic in gabled dormers. Inside is an inglenook, and the remains of three full crucks.	II
Church House; 53.1974°N 2.7629°W		c. 1600	This originated as the wing of a farmhouse, later converted into a separate house. In the 19th century alterations were made, including an extension to the rear. The house is timber-framed with brick nogging on a stone plinth, the extension being in brick. The roof is in Welsh slate. It has two storeys and an attic, with a one-bay front under a gable facing the street. The upper storeys are slightly jettied.	II
Holme Street Hall; 53.1944°N 2.7798°W	—	Early 17th century	A large farmhouse, extended to the rear in the late 16th century. It is built in red brick on a stone plinth, with buff sandstone dressings and a Welsh slate roof. The farmhouse has three storeys, and a symmetrical three-bay front. The windows are mullioned and contain sashes. In the centre is a projecting two-storey gabled porch.	II
51 High Street; 53.19740°N 2.76526°W		17th century	Originally a farmhouse, alteration, including raising the roof, were carried out in the 20th century. It is partly timber-framed with brick nogging on a natural sandstone base, and partly in brick. It has a tiled roof. The house is in two storeys, and has a three-bay front. The windows in the lower floor are casements, and in the upper floor they are in half-dormers with applied timber framing.	II
Church hall, grammar school and hearse house 53.1974°N 2.7625°W		1666	A range of buildings to the north of the churchyard of St Andrew's Church. They are in buff sandstone and brick, and have a Welsh slate roof. They are in one and two storeys, and together have a ten-bay front. At the left end is the former hearse house, the central three bays were the school, then the schoolmaster's house, and at the end is a two-bay cottage.	II
76 High Street; 53.19873°N 2.76192°W		Late 17th century (probable)	A stone cottage on a natural sandstone base, with a thatched roof. It is in two storeys and has a three-bay front. The windows are casements, and the door is approached by worn stone steps.	II
86 High Street; 53.19891°N 2.76164°W		Late 17th century to early 18th century	Originating as a cottage and a shippon, the roof was raised later, converting it into a house and a store. It is built in buff sandstone on a sandstone outcrop, with a brick upper floor and a Welsh slate roof. It is in two storeys, the house having a three-bay front. The windows are casements. The outbuilding to the left is lower, and contains ventilators in a diamond pattern.	II
Hollinsworth tombstone 53.19733°N 2.76253°W		1708	The tombstone is to the memory of Breatrix Hollinsworth. It is in buff sandstone and consists of an upright slab containing an inscription and decorated with the heads of three cherubs surrounded by drapery.	II
Laurel House; 53.19907°N 2.76204°W		Early 18th century	This originated as a farmhouse and was later converted into a house and a cottage. The main part is in brick on a stone plinth, and has three storeys and a three-bay front. The left wing is in pebbledashed stone, with a gable facing the road, it has a rock-cut cellar and casement windows. The windows in the other part date from the 20th century.	II
Red Lion; 53.1976°N 2.7634°W		Mid-18th century	Originating as an inn, later a public house, it is in rendered brick with a Welsh slate roof. It was altered in the 19th century, converting it from a single-pile building to one with an L-shaped plan. It is in three storeys, and has an almost symmetrical three-bay front. The windows are a mix of casements and sashes. Inside is an inglenook.	II
Sundial; 53.19714°N 2.76242°W		Mid-18th century	The sundial is in ashlar buff sandstone. It consists of a column baluster on three circular steps. On the cap is a bronze plaque containing a name, date, the points of the compass, and a star. On the plaque is a scrolled gnomon.	II
The Flaggs and Hamilton House; 53.1976°N 2.7630°W		1752	A pair of brick houses on a stone plinth with sandstone dressings and a Welsh slate roof. They have three storeys with cellars and a symmetrical eight-bay front. The windows are sashes with stone rusticated heads, keystones and sills. Above the left doorway is a segmental pediment, and above the right doorway the pediment is triangular. The front garden walls and gates are included in the listing.	II*
54 High Street; 53.1978°N 2.7630°W		1753	This originated as a house, then was used as a public house, and later converted into a house and a shop. It is built in brick on a sandstone base with a rock-cut cellar, and has a Welsh slate roof. The house is in three storeys, and has a four-bay front. The doorway is approached by four steps, and the windows are casements.	II
Tarvin Hall; 53.1972°N 2.7655°W		Mid- to late 18th century	This originated as a mansion; it was later used as a school, and then converted into a house. It is built in brick on a stone plinth with stone dressings and has a hipped roof of Welsh slate. The house has a double-pile plan, and is in three storeys. The ground floor is stuccoed. The east front is symmetrical with three bays, the centre bay projecting slightly forward under a pediment. The entrance has a Tuscan doorcase with a semicircular fanlight. In the lateral bays are Venetian windows. The other windows are sashes.	II*
Minshull tombchest 53.19716°N 2.76276°W		1762	The tombchest is to the memory of John Minshull and his daughter. It is in buff sandstone. On the sides are rectangular panels and medallions. The slab bears inscriptions and decorations.	II
78 and 80 High Street; 53.19870°N 2.76158°W		Late 18th century	Originating as two cottages and a house, the building was later converted into two houses. It is constructed in brick on a natural sandstone base, and has a Welsh slate roof. The building is in two storeys, and has a seven-bay front, the left four bays originally forming the cottages. The windows are casements.	II
Gates and gate piers, St Andrew's Church; 53.19731°N 2.76282°W		Late 18th century	The gate piers are in ashlar buff sandstone. They are square, standing on a moulded plinth, and have moulded stepped capstones carrying goblet-shaped urns. Between them is a pair of wrought iron gates.	II
Holme Bank; 53.1980°N 2.7805°W	—	Late 18th century	A house in stuccoed brick with a Welsh slate roof. It has a double-pile plan, is in two storeys, and has a symmetrical three-bay front. The house is surrounded by a flagged terrace on which is a 19th-century verandah carried on square wooden piers. The windows in the lower floor are casements; those in the upper floor are sashes.	II
Mount Pleasant; 53.2031°N 2.7579°W	—	Late 18th century	Originating as a farmhouse, the house is in brick with a Welsh slate roof. It has a double-pile plan, is in three storeys, and has a symmetrical three-bay front. The windows are a mix of sashes, some of which are horizontally-sliding, and casements. In the central bay is a 19th-century porch consisting of pierced panels.	II
Hilton tombchest 53.19729°N 2.76270°W	—	1782	The tombchest is to the memory of William and Elizabeth Hilton. It is in buff sandstone. On the long sides are rectangular inscribed panels. The east side has an inscription, and on the west side are large elliptical medallions.	II
Vicarage; 53.1968°N 2.7624°W		Late 18th to early 19th century	A large brick house with a Welsh slate roof. It has a double-pile plan, and is in two storeys. The north front has three bays with a central doorway, and the garden front has four bays. The windows are sashes.	II
Poolbank; 53.20110°N 2.75916°W	—	c. 1820	The large farmhouse is built in stuccoed brick with stone dressings and has a Welsh slate roof. It has a double-pile plan, is in two and three storeys with cellars, and has a symmetrical three-bay front. In the central bay is a detached Tuscan porch with an entablature; this leads to an doorway with an elliptical fanlight. The window are sashes.	II
G. Gunnery and Son [now Cornichon restaurant] 53.1978°N 2.7633°W		Early 19th century	A shop and warehouse in brick with a Welsh slate roof. It is in two storeys, and has a three-bay front. In the lower floor is a wide shop front with plate glass windows flanking a recessed glazed entrance; this is divided by pilasters and columns. In the upper floor are sash windows, and at the rear is a three-storey warehouse. Inside is "an intact interior of a mid-late C19 grocers and Italian warehouseman".	II
Sandbach tombchest 53.19712°N 2.76245°W		1829	The tombchest is to the memory of William Sandbach and others. It is in buff sandstone. On the long sides is decoration with acanthus leaves and blind arcading. One short side bears an inscription, the other is decorated with urns and swags in niches.	II
Roade House; 53.19745°N 2.76496°W	—	Early to mid-19th century	A brick house with a Welsh slate roof in late Georgian style. It is in two storeys and has a four-bay front. The window are sashes, and at the top of the house is a moulded stone cornice. In the second bay is a projecting iron porch, with a fringe of palmettes carried on thin columns.	II
War memorial 53.19723°N 2.76287°W		1920	The war memorial stands in a raised enclosure by the entrance to the churchyard of St Andrew's Church. It is in sandstone, and consists of a wheel-head cross on a tapering shaft. The shaft is set on an octagonal plinth with a base of three octagonal steps. On the sides of the plinth and on the top step of the base are bronze plaques with inscriptions and the names of those lost in the two World Wars. The enclosure is bounded by low sandstone walls and four pillars, and in the centre is an inscribed stone tablet.	II

== See also ==
- Listed buildings in Ashton Hayes
- Listed buildings in Barrow, Cheshire
- Listed buildings in Bruen Stapleford
- Listed buildings in Burton
- Listed buildings in Christleton
- Listed buildings in Cotton Edmunds
- Listed buildings in Duddon
- Listed buildings in Horton cum Peel
- Listed buildings in Huxley
- Listed buildings in Kelsall
- Listed buildings in Willington
