= Burton Hall =

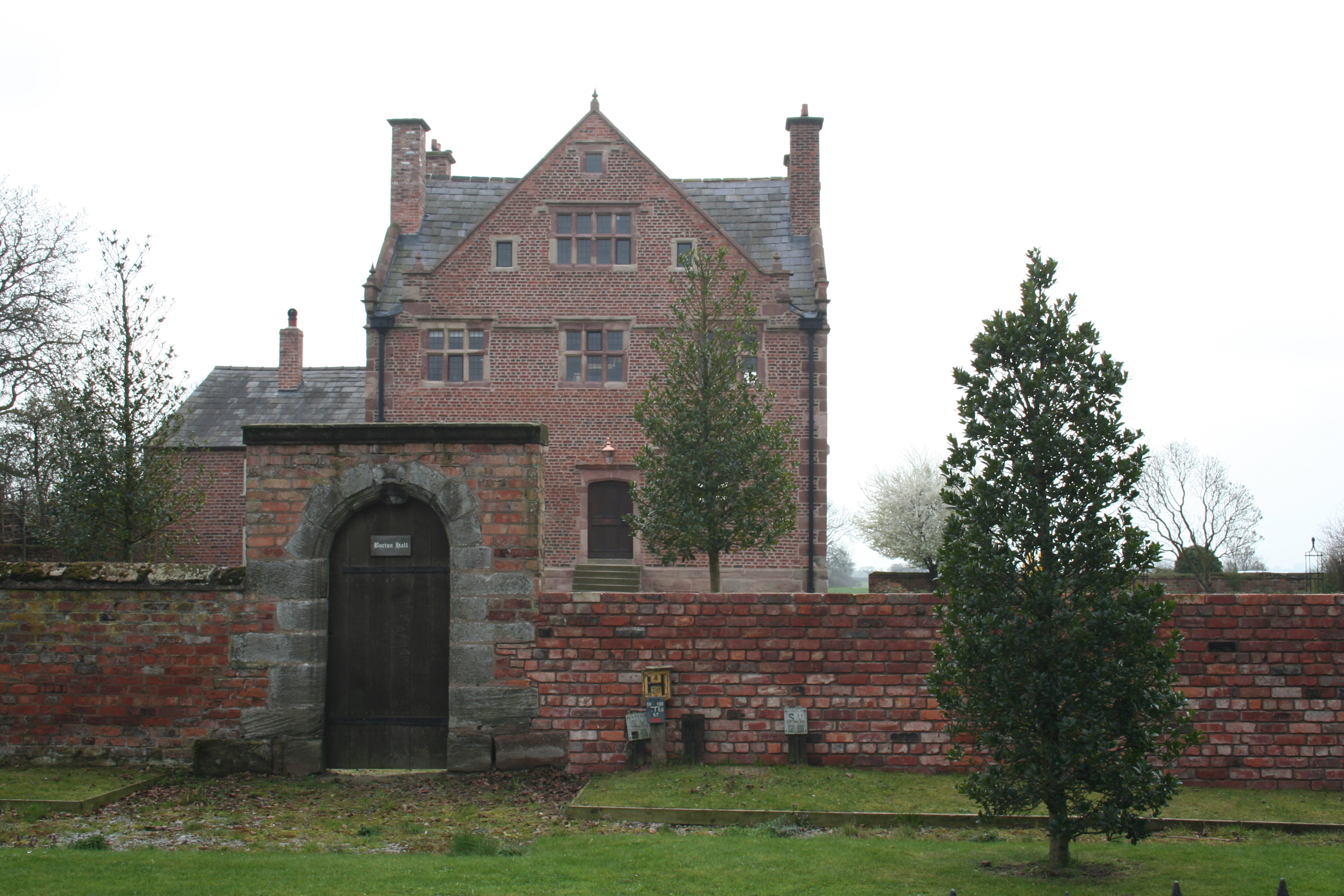

- Location in Cheshire
- 53.1704°N 2.7365°W
- OS grid reference: SJ 508 639

History
- Built for: John Werden

Site notes
- Restored: 2007

Listed Building – Grade II*
- Designated: 22 October 1952
- Reference no.: 1130559

Burton Hall is in the small village of Burton, 2 miles (3 km) to the southeast of the larger village of Tarvin, Cheshire, England. It is recorded in the National Heritage List for England as a designated Grade II* listed building.

The house dates from the early 17th century, and was built by John Werden. There have been some small 19th-century additions. It is built in brick with buff sandstone dressings, it has a Welsh slate roof, and four stone-capped brick chimneys. Its plan is square and the house has three storeys over a basement, with a symmetrical three-bay front. The entrance is approached by ten stone steps. The garden walls and gateway are separately listed at Grade II.

The Rowton family purchased the building, which had fallen into considerable disrepair throughout the late 20th century, in 2006 and carried out an extensive restoration programme. In 2018, they advertised a raffle in which participants could buy tickets for £5 and have the chance of winning the house.

== See also ==
- Grade II* listed buildings in Cheshire West and Chester
- Listed buildings in Burton, Gowy
