= William Leigh =

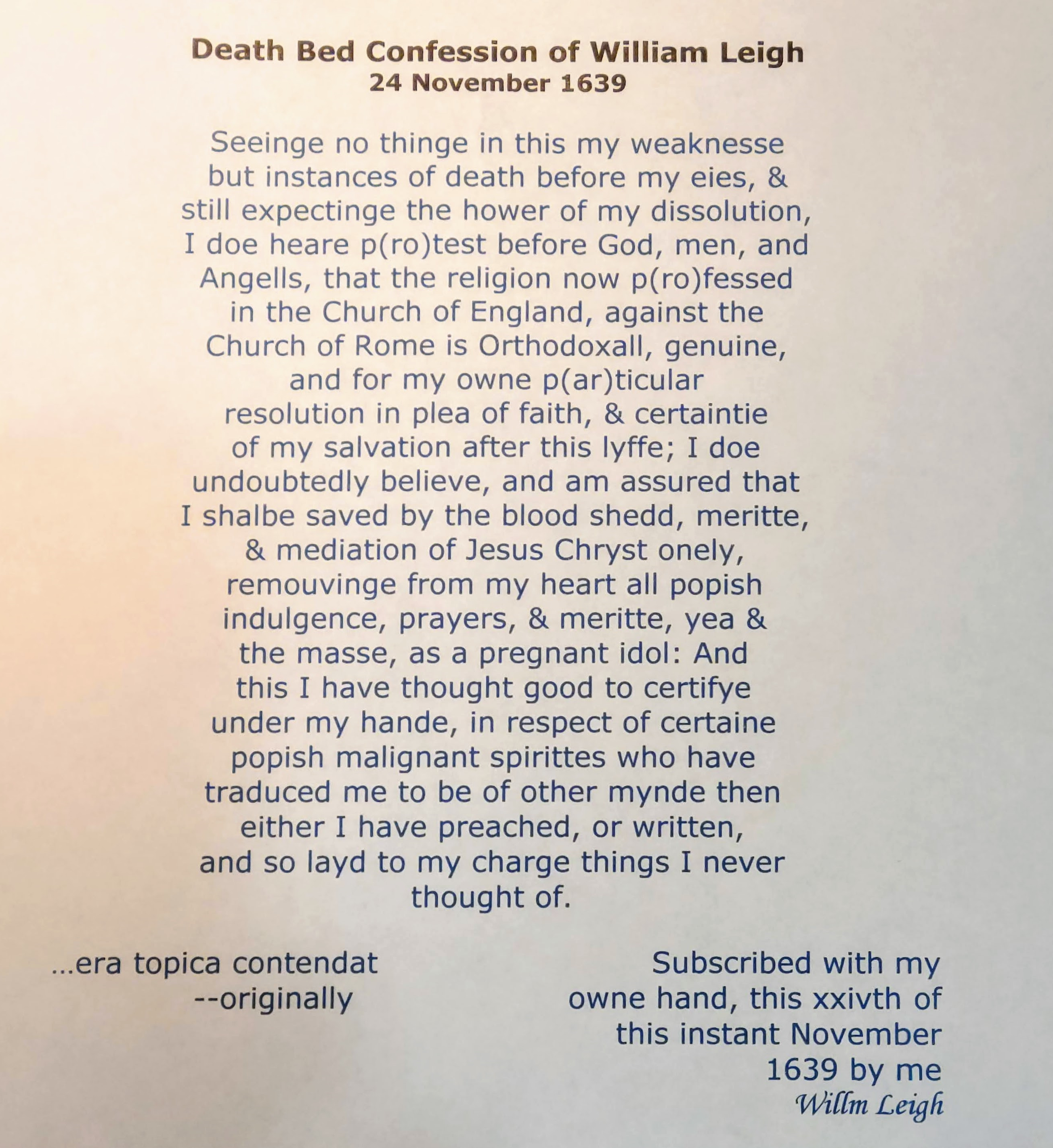
Transliteration of William Leigh's 1639 death bed confession.

William Leigh (1550–1639) was an English priest, well known as a preacher and author. An Oxford graduate, he was the rector of St Wilfrid's Church, Standish, Lancashire, from 1586 until his death.

Leigh is presumed to have baptized the Mayflower Pilgrim Myles Standish. He is now remembered for his sermon series Queene Elizabeth paraleld from 1612, which includes the first published text record for the queen's speech to the troops at Tilbury in 1588.

== Life ==
He was born in Lancashire, and entered Brasenose College, Oxford, in 1571. There he was elected fellow in 1573, graduated B.A. on 10 December 1574, M.A. on 29 January 1578, and B.D. on 4 July 1586. He took holy orders, and was known as a preacher at Oxford and elsewhere. On 24 July 1584 he asked the university authorities for a preaching license to enable him to preach at St. Paul's Cross. In 1586 he was presented by Bishop William Chaderton to the rectory of Standish, near Wigan, Lancashire, which he held till his death.

He was made a justice of the peace, and led an active public life. He was also chaplain to Henry Stanley, 4th Earl of Derby, and often preached before his patron. Soon after the accession of James I he preached before the court, and the king appointed him tutor to his eldest son Henry Frederick, Prince of Wales. In June 1608 Lord Chancellor Egerton gave him the mastership of Ewelme Hospital, Oxfordshire; this sinecure position was made from 1617 to support the Oxford Professor of Physic, but the transition was the tenure of his successor William White from 1611 to 1628.

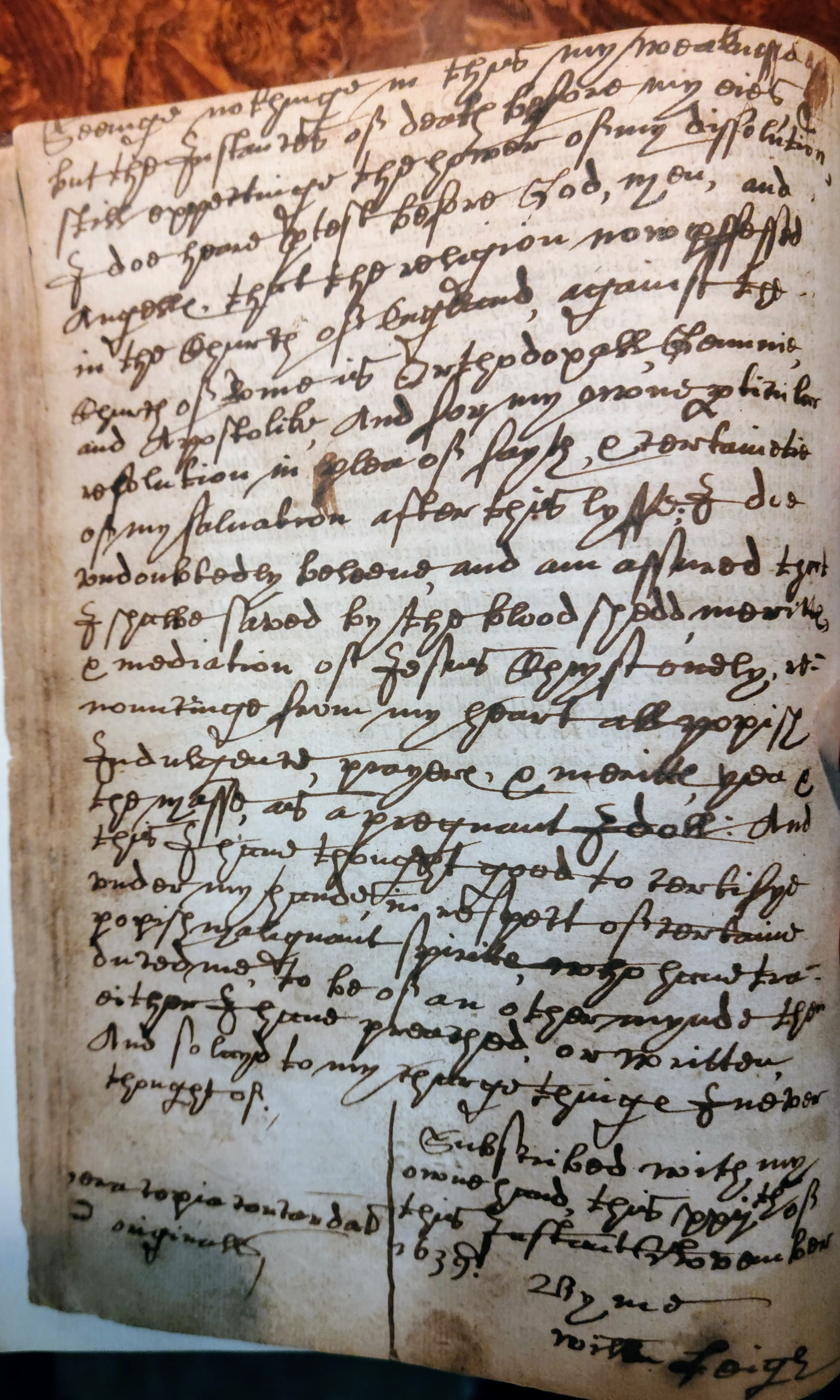
Written two days before his death at age 89, Leigh proclaims before "God, men, and angels" that the Church of England embodies the true Christian religion. Dying, he remains certain of his salvation in the afterlife.

As a parish priest he continued the restoration of the church, which was begun by his predecessor, and gave an oak pulpit in 1616. He died on 26 November 1639, aged 89, and was buried in the chancel of Standish Church, where there is a brass, with Latin inscription, to his memory. He married Mary, daughter of John Wrightington of Wrightington, Lancashire, and left children.

== Works ==
Leigh wrote the following:

- The Souls Solace against Sorrow, a funeral sermon on Katharine Brettargh, published with another sermon by William Harrison of Huyton, 1602, 1605; 5th edit. 1617.
- The Christians Watch . . . preached at Prestbury Church in Cheshire at the funerals of. . . Thomas Leigh of Adlington, 1605.
- Great Britaines Great Deliverance from the great danger of Popish Powder, 1606, dedicated to Prince Henry.
- The First Step towards Heaven, or Anna the Prophetesse her holy Haunt, to the Temple of God, 1609.
- The Dreadfull Day, dolorous to the wicked, but glorious to all such as looke and long after Christ his second coming, 1610.
- Queen Elizabeth paraleld in her Princely Vertues with David, Josua, and Hezekia, 1612.
- The Drumme of Devotion, striking out an Allarum to Prayer, 1613.
- Strange News of a Prodigious Monster borne in the Towneship of Adlington in the Parish of Standish . . ., 1613.

Besides containing a version of the Tilbury speech, with its well-known rhetoric of gender, Queen Elizabeth paraleld worked out national allegory in the style of Edmund Spenser's Faerie Queene with Old Testament typology, in a way later taken up by Paul Knell. It further elaborated the coincidence of names with the future Elizabeth of Bohemia, King James's daughter the Princess Elizabeth; the book consisting of three sermons that Leigh had given late in Elizabeth I's reign was dedicated to the Princess Elizabeth, and may have been prompted by the assassination in 1610 of Henry IV of France; the dedication mentions in polemic fashion not only the assassin Ravaillac but the Jesuits Juan de Mariana and Robert Doleman, pseudonym of Robert Parsons.

The text given by Leigh for the Tilbury speech is not the same as that of Leonel Sharp. It is close to the wording accompanying a painting in the church at Gaywood, Norfolk.
