= Katharine Brettargh =

Katherine Brettargh
- A woodcut of Katherine
- Born: Katherine Breun
- Baptised: 13 February 1579
- Died: 31 May 1601
- Other name: Catherine Bretterg
- Spouse: William Brettargh
- Parent: John Bruen

Katharine Brettargh (1579–1601) was an English Puritan woman from a well-known evangelical Cheshire family, whose early death was made the subject of "godly" biographical commentary.

== Life ==
Brettargh was daughter of a Cheshire squire, John and Dorothy Bruen of Bruen Stapleford, and the sister of John Bruen. She was baptised on 13 February 1579, and from an early age she was distinguished by earnest religious feeling. When she was about twenty she was married to William Brettargh or Brettergh, of 'Brellerghoult' - Brettargh Holt - near Liverpool, who shared her puritan sentiments. The couple were said to have had some persecution at the hands of their Roman Catholic neighbours. 'It is not unknowne to Lancashire what horses and cattell of her husband's were killed upon his grounds in the night most barbarously at two seuerall times by seminary priests (no question) and recusants that lurked thereabouts.' Her piety, however, was such as to impress them in spite of her dislike of their creed. 'Once a tenant of her husband's being behinde with his rent, she desired him to beare yet with him a quarter of a yeare, which he did; and when the man brought his money, with teares she said to her husband, "I feare you doe not well to take it of him, though it be your right, for I doubt he is not well able to pay it, and then you oppresse the poore."' It is perhaps characteristic of the times that her biographer insists upon the circumstance that 'she never used to swear an oath great or small.' After a little more than two years of married life she was attacked by 'a hot burning ague,' of which she died on Whit Sunday, 31 May 1601.

She was encouraged by a visit from her brother, John Bruen, and by the consolations of William Harrison and other puritans. She was buried at Childwall Church on Wednesday, 3 June.

== Biographical coverage ==
The short book that forms the chief authority as to her life is Death's Advantage little Regarded, by William Harrison of Huyton and William Leigh. Her biographers are indignant at the imputation that she died despairing. There is a portrait of her in Samuel Clarke's second part of the 'Marrow of Ecclesiastical History,' book ii., London, 1675, p. 52, in an elaborate ruff, the hair closely confined by a sort of skull-cap, over which towers a sugarloaf hat.
