= Duddon and Burton =

Civil parish in Cheshire, England

Coordinates: 53.174507°N 2.731539°W

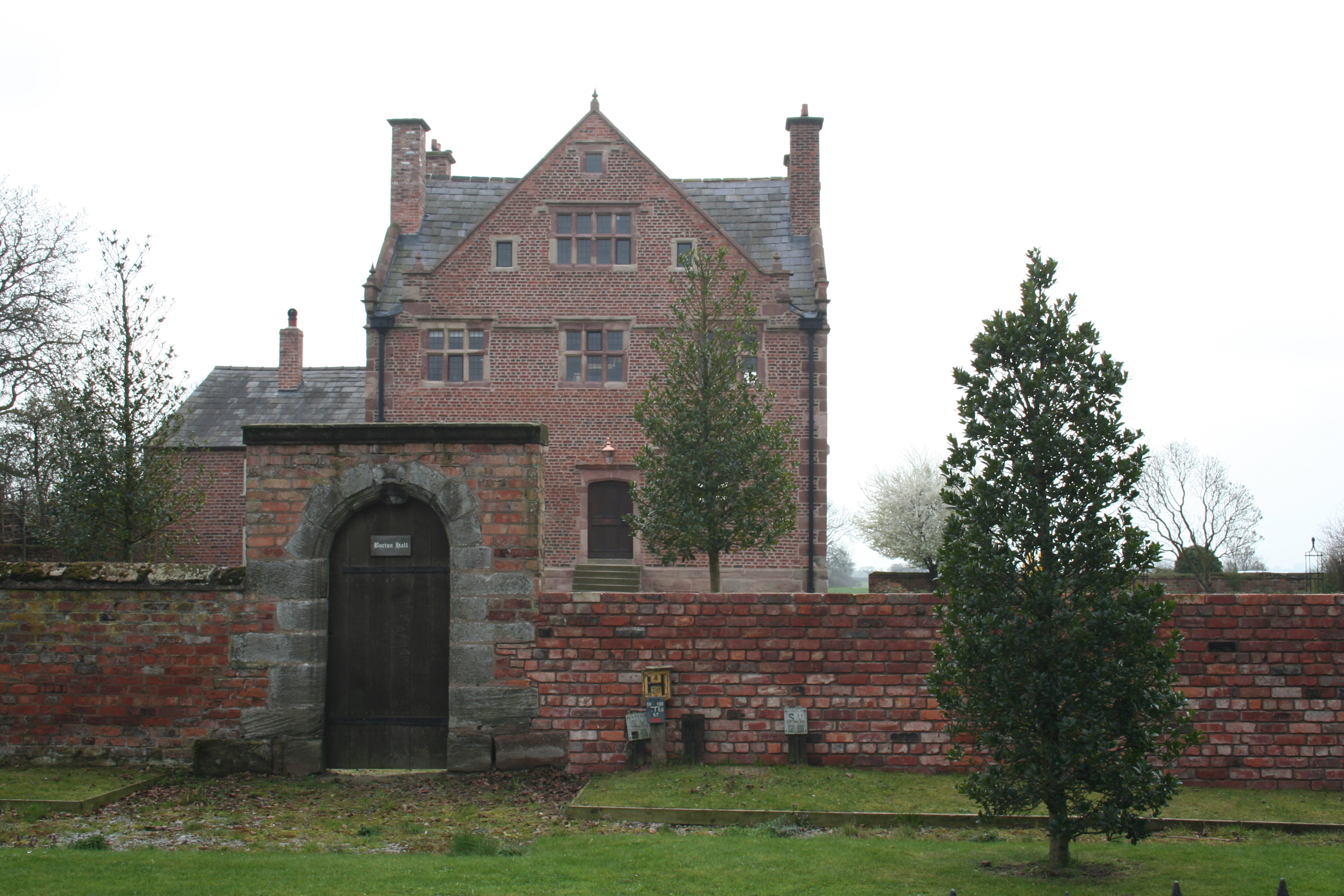
- Burton Hall

- Location within Cheshire
- Civil parish: Duddon and Burton
- Unitary authority: Cheshire West and Chester
- Ceremonial county: Cheshire
- Region: North West
- Country: England
- Sovereign state: United Kingdom
- Post town: Tarporley
- Postcode district: CW6
- Dialling code: 01829
- Police: Cheshire
- Fire: Cheshire
- Ambulance: North West
- UK Parliament: Chester South and Eddisbury

Duddon and Burton is a civil parish in the unitary authority of Cheshire West and Chester and the ceremonial county of Cheshire, England. The parish is formed of the villages of Duddon and Burton.

== Location ==
The parish is about 2 miles (3.2 km) south east of Tarvin and 3 miles (4.8 km) west of Tarporley.

== Governance ==
The parish falls within the unitary authority of Cheshire West and Chester and the Westminster constituency of Chester South and Eddisbury.

Until 2015, Duddon and Burton were separate civil parishes. However Burton had neither a parish council nor a parish meeting, and, consequently, the duties that would normally be performed by these bodies were the responsibility of Cheshire West and Chester Council.

From 1 April 2015, Burton parish was merged with Duddon parish to create a new, larger parish. On 1 July 2017 the new parish was renamed to Duddon and Burton.

== See also ==
- Listed buildings in Burton (near Tarporley)
- Listed buildings in Duddon
