= Duddon Old Hall =

Country house in Duddon, Cheshire, England

Coordinates: 53.17716°N 2.72637°W

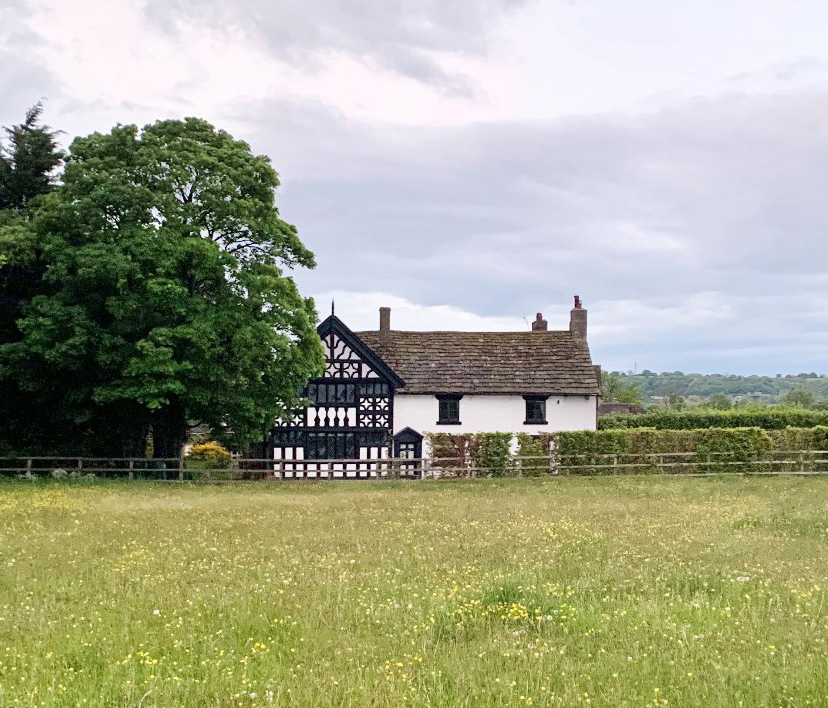
Duddon Old Hall

Duddon Old Hall is a country house in the village of Duddon, Cheshire, England. It dates from the later part of the 16th century, the house was in the ownership of the Done family at this time. Alterations and additions were made in the early 19th century, and later in the century the timber framing was restored in 1903–4 and these works may be associated to local architect John Douglas of Chester. The timber framing was most recently extensively repaired between September 2021 and April 2022. It is constructed partly in timber-framing, and partly in brick, on a stone plinth. It is roofed partly in stone-slate, and partly in Welsh slate. The plan consists of a hall with a cross wing. The house is in two storeys, and its south front has four bays. The bay at the left end is timber-framed; it projects and has a gable with a bargeboard. The architectural historian Nikolaus Pevsner comments that the black-and-white decoration of this bay is "very rich". It consists of studding in the ground floor, lozenges and shaped balusters in the upper floor, and lozenges and serpentine struts in the gable. In the adjacent bay is a wooden doorcase with a triangular pediment. All the windows are casements. Internally, the main chamber is in the cross wing, which is open to the roof. The house is recorded in the National Heritage List for England as a designated Grade II listed building. To the northeast of the house is a 16th-century barn, constructed in timber-framing with brick infill, which is also listed at Grade II.

== See also ==
- Listed buildings in Duddon
