= Listed buildings in Bruen Stapleford =

Bruen Stapleford is a former civil parish, now in the parish of Tarvin, in Cheshire West and Chester, England. It contains three buildings that are recorded in the National Heritage List for England as designated listed buildings, all of which are at Grade II. This grade is the lowest of the three gradings given to listed buildings and is applied to "buildings of national importance and special interest". The parish is entirely rural, the listed buildings consisting of a farmhouse, a sundial and a barn.

Name and location	Photograph	Date	Notes
Barn, Stapleford Hall; 53.1756°N 2.7644°W	—	Mid to late 17th century	Originating as a threshing barn, it is a brick building with sandstone dressings, standing on a stone plinth. It has a tiled roof, and a dentil cornice. The barn is in three storeys, with a three-bay front. It contains doorways, a circular pitch hole, and ventilation slots.
Sundial, Stapleford Hall; 53.17573°N 2.76489°W	—	Late 18th century	The sundial is in sandstone and stands on three circular steps. It consists of a baluster with acanthus decoration, and an Ionic column. On this sits an octagonal plate of a later date.
Stapleford Hall; 53.1755°N 2.7649°W		1789	The hall was altered in the mid 19th century. It is constructed in brick with sandstone dressings and a slate roof in two ranges. The hall has a square plan, is in two storeys, and has a symmetrical three-bay front. The central bay projects slightly forward, and has a pediment containing an elliptical blocked window and is surmounted by an obelisk finial. The doorcase is in Tuscan style, and the windows are casements.
