= Speech to the Troops at Tilbury =

1588 speech by Queen Elizabeth I of England

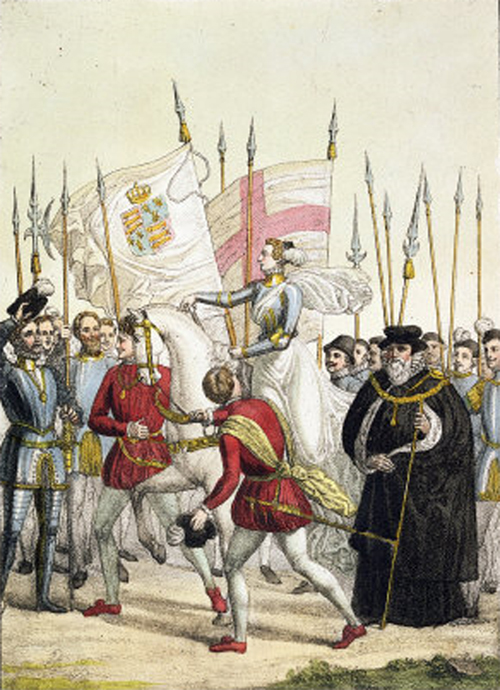
Illustration of Elizabeth delivering the speech

The Speech to the Troops at Tilbury was delivered on 9 August Old Style (19 August New Style) 1588 by Queen Elizabeth I of England to the land forces earlier assembled at Tilbury in Essex in preparation for repelling the expected invasion by the Spanish Armada.

Before the speech the Armada had been driven from the Strait of Dover in the Battle of Gravelines eleven days earlier, and had by then rounded Scotland on its way home, but troops were still held at ready in case the Spanish army of Alexander Farnese, Duke of Parma, might yet attempt to invade from Dunkirk; two days later they were discharged. On the day of the speech, the Queen left her bodyguard before Tilbury Fort and went among her subjects with an escort of six men. Lord Ormonde walked ahead with the Sword of State; he was followed by a page leading the Queen's charger and another bearing her silver helmet on a cushion; then came the Queen herself, in white with a silver cuirass and mounted on a grey gelding. She was flanked on horseback by her lieutenant general the Earl of Leicester on the right, and on the left by the Earl of Essex, her Master of the Horse. Sir John Norreys brought up the rear.

== First version ==
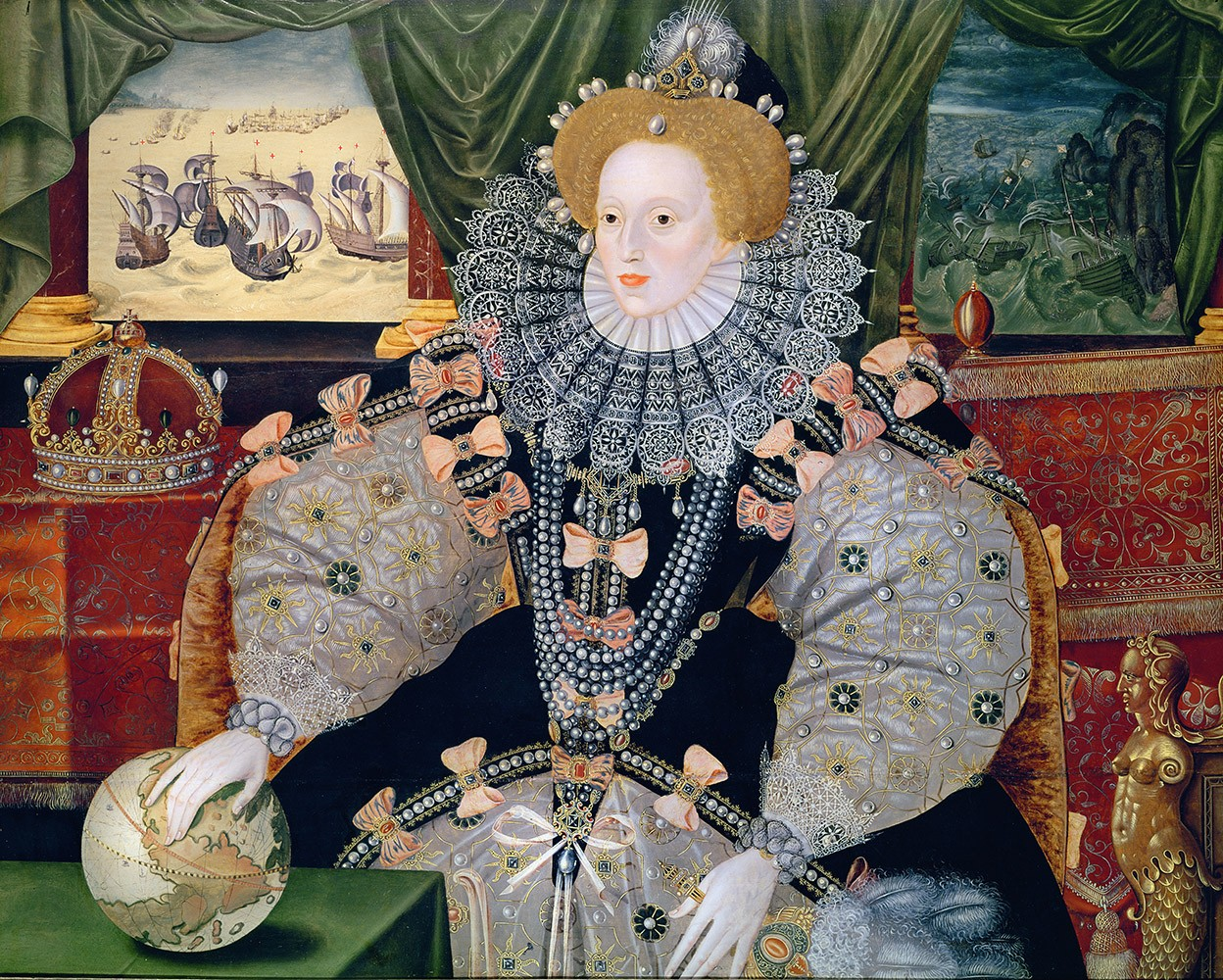
The Armada Portrait of Elizabeth made to commemorate the Spanish Armada's defeat

The version that is most widely considered to be authentic was found in a letter from Leonel Sharp to the Duke of Buckingham. Sharp had been attached to the Earl of Leicester at Tilbury during the threatened invasion of the Spanish Armada and he later became chaplain to Buckingham. Sharp wrote: "The queen the next morning rode through all the squadrons of her army as armed Pallas attended by noble footmen, Leicester, Essex, and Norris, then lord marshal, and divers other great lords. Where she made an excellent oration to her army, which the next day after her departure, I was commanded to redeliver all the army together, to keep a public fast". He also claimed: "No man hath it but myself, and such as I have given it to". It was published in 1654 in a collection titled Cabala, Mysteries of State. (pp. 372–374) A late sixteenth- or early seventeenth-century copy of this speech (with minor variants to the published version) exists in the Harleian Collection of the British Library.

My loving people.

We have been persuaded by some that are careful of our safety, to take heed how we commit our selves to armed multitudes, for fear of treachery; but I assure you I do not desire to live to distrust my faithful and loving people. Let tyrants fear. I have always so behaved myself that, under God, I have placed my chiefest strength and safeguard in the loyal hearts and good-will of my subjects; and therefore I am come amongst you, as you see, at this time, not for my recreation and disport, but being resolved, in the midst and heat of the battle, to live and die amongst you all; to lay down for my God, and for my kingdom, and my people, my honour and my blood, even in the dust.

I know I have the body but of a weak, feeble woman; but I have the heart and stomach of a king, and of a king of England too, and think foul scorn that Parma or Spain, or any prince of Europe, should dare to invade the borders of my realm; to which rather than any dishonour shall grow by me, I myself will take up arms, I myself will be your general, judge, and rewarder of every one of your virtues in the field.

I know already, for your forwardness you have deserved rewards and crowns; and we do assure you on a word of a prince, they shall be duly paid. In the mean time, my lieutenant general shall be in my stead, than whom never prince commanded a more noble or worthy subject; not doubting but by your obedience to my general, by your concord in the camp, and your valour in the field, we shall shortly have a famous victory over these enemies of my God, of my kingdom, and of my people.

=== Authenticity ===
The speech's veracity was accepted by the historian J. E. Neale in an article, 'The Sayings of Queen Elizabeth': "I see no serious reason for rejecting the speech. ... some of the phrases have every appearance of being the Queen's, and the whole tone of the speech is surely very much in keeping even with the few Elizabethan quotations that I have had room for in this article. ... I have little doubt that Sharp's version is a copy, at two or three removes, of a speech actually written by Elizabeth herself". The speech has been accepted as genuine by the historians Mandell Creighton, Garrett Mattingly, Patrick Collinson ("...there is no reason to doubt its authenticity"), Wallace T. MacCaffrey, Lady Anne Somerset, Antonia Fraser, Alison Weir, Christopher Haigh, Simon Schama, David Starkey and Robert Hutchinson.

Janet M. Green of Kent State University in an article for the Sixteenth Century Journal in 1997 states that "substantial evidence exists for believing the Tilbury oration is genuine, which falls into three categories: First, internal rhetorical characteristics link this oration very strongly to Elizabeth's others. Second, there is considerable contemporary evidence that she delivered a speech at Tilbury whose phrases, often remarked, were like those of the speech we have.... The internal evidence of the Tilbury oration provides the best argument for Elizabeth's authorship".

David Loades has written: "Whether she used these words, we do not know, although they have an authentic, theatrical ring".

However, there are some historians who question its authenticity, such as Miller Christy, in 1919. Also sceptical were Felix Barker and Susan Frye.

== Physical appearance at Tilbury ==
Elizabeth's physical appearance was vital to the historical event and just at least as important as the actual speech. Dozens of descriptions of Elizabeth on that day exist, with slightly differing details. Similarities between descriptions indicate that she at least wore a plumed helmet and a steel cuirass over a white velvet gown. She held a gold and silver truncheon, or baton, in her hand as she rode atop a white steed. As quoted in J. E. Neale's Elizabeth, her demeanour was "full of princely resolution and more than feminine courage" and that "she passed like some Amazonian empress through all her army". That striking image is reminiscent of several literary and mythological figures. One of those is Pallas Athena, the Greek goddess of war, who was often classically portrayed as wearing a helmet and armour. Another figure that Elizabeth represented during this speech was Britomart, originally a Greek nymph and more recently the allegorical heroine in Edmund Spenser's epic The Faerie Queene. The etymology of the name "Britomart" seems to suggest British military power. Spenser deliberately wrote the character to represent Queen Elizabeth I and so in essence, they are the same. Her subjects would have been familiar with both Athena and Britomart, and Elizabeth's adoption of their personas would have been fairly recognisable. Besides representing the figures, by wearing armour, Elizabeth implied that she was ready to fight for and alongside her people.

== Speech ==
After she had made her rounds through the troops, Elizabeth delivered her speech to them. Leonel Sharp's version is accepted as the speech that she gave, and it best captures her rhetorical strategies as opposed to the versions of William Leigh and James Aske. In the past, Elizabeth had defied gender expectations by refusing to marry or produce heirs, instead opting to rule alone, with God and England as her soul mates. Elizabeth practically claims that she is both King and Queen of England in the most famous line of the address, "I have the body of a weak, feeble woman; but I have the heart and stomach of a king, and of a King of England too." At the same time that she claims the power, she acknowledges her physical weakness and condescends to the level of soldiers and subjects to whom she lovingly refers in the speech. Elizabeth calls upon God in the speech and asserts confidence in her own faith and the salvation of herself and her people, thereby placing Spain and the Pope as the ones in the wrong, calling them "tyrants" and "enemies" of both Elizabeth and England.

If the speech is accepted as the true speech given at Tilbury, it is worth noting that Elizabeth wrote it herself. As a writer, she wrote many of her own speeches, as well as poems.

== Second version ==
Another version of the speech was recorded in 1612 by William Leigh. His version reads:

Come on now, my companions at arms, and fellow soldiers, in the field, now for the Lord, for your Queen, and for the Kingdom. For what are these proud Philistines, that they should revile the host of the living God? I have been your Prince in peace, so will I be in war; neither will I bid you go and fight, but come and let us fight the battle of the Lord. The enemy perhaps may challenge my sex for that I am a woman, so may I likewise charge their mould for that they are but men, whose breath is in their nostrils, and if God do not charge England with the sins of England, little do I fear their force… Si deus nobiscum quis contra nos? (if God is with us, who can be against us?)

== Third version ==
In Elizabetha Triumphans, published in 1588, James Aske provides a version of the speech, reworked in verse:

Their loyal hearts to us their lawful Queen.
For sure we are that none beneath the heavens
Have readier subjects to defend their right:
Which happiness we count to us as chief.
And though of love their duties crave no less
Yet say to them that we in like regard
And estimate of this their dearest zeal
(In time of need shall ever call them forth
To dare in field their fierce and cruel foes)
Will be ourself their noted General
Ne dear at all to us shall be our life,
Ne palaces or Castles huge of stone
Shall hold as then our presence from their view:
But in the midst and very heart of them
Bellona-like we mean as them to march;
On common lot of gain or loss to both
They well shall see we recke shall then betide.
And as for honour with most large rewards,
Let them not care they common there shall be:
The meanest man who shall deserve a might,
A mountain shall for his desart receive.
And this our speech and this our solemn vow
In fervent love to those our subjects dear,
Say, seargeant-major, tell them from our self,
On kingly faith we will perform it there…

== Summary ==
A summary of the speech appears in Lewes Lewkenor's The Estate of English Fugitives written in 1595, which mentions the Spanish Armada.

Lewkenor says,

I cannot here omit to speak a word or two, as well of the worthiness; and loyalty of those honourable gentlemen of her majesties court, who upon the approach of the Spanish fleet, presented, not only their persons and lives for the defence of her majesty, but also a great portion and yearly revenue of their lands; as also of her majesties great benignity and gracious answer, telling them, that she accounted herself rich enough in that she possessed such subjects, assuring them, that for her part, she would spend the last penny of her treasures for their defence, rather than she would be burthenous unto them. O happy people in such a princess, and happy princess in such a people!

== In popular culture ==
Reports of the queen's visit to Tilbury circulated rapidly in the popular media of the day. On 10 August, one day after the speech, a broadside ballad describing the events was registered by the printer John Wolfe in the Stationer's Register of London. The ballad, written by Thomas Deloney, one of the most popular poets of the day, corresponds fairly closely to John Aske's description of the events in Elizabetha Triumphans. A second ballad on the same subject, likewise printed by Wolfe, also survives.

Parts of the speech were quoted in the television series Elizabeth R (1971), The Virgin Queen (2005) and Elizabeth I (2005), as well at the films Fire Over England (1937) and Elizabeth: The Golden Age (2007).
