= St Andrew's Church, Tarvin =

Coordinates: 53.1974°N 2.7620°W

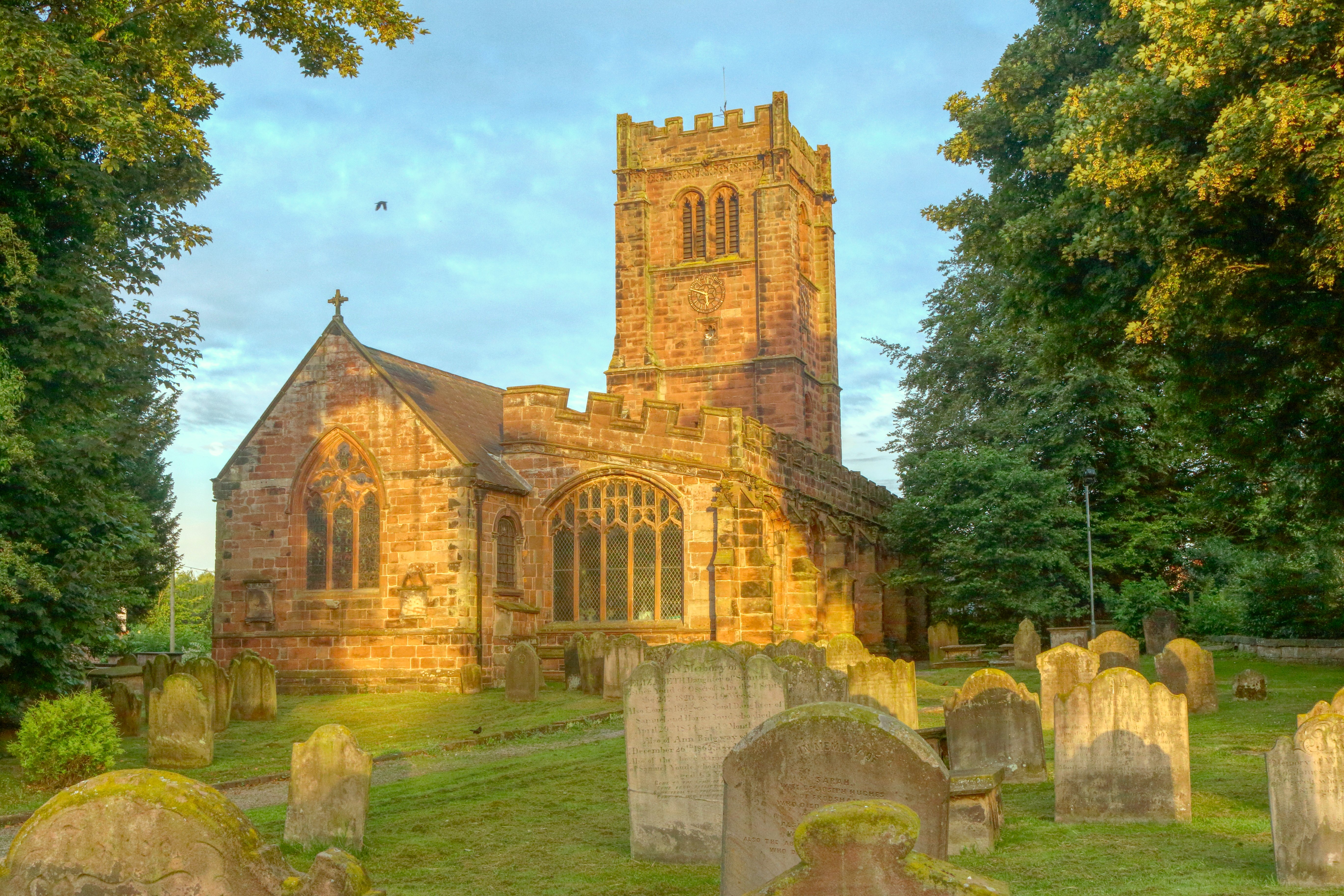
- St Andrew's Church, Tarvin

- Location in Cheshire
- OS grid reference: SJ 491 669
- Location: Tarvin, Cheshire
- Country: England
- Denomination: Anglican
- Website: St Andrew, Tarvin

History
- Status: Parish church
- Dedication: Saint Andrew

Architecture
- Functional status: Active
- Heritage designation: Grade I
- Designated: 1 March 1967
- Architectural type: Church
- Style: Gothic

Specifications
- Materials: Red sandstone Welsh slate roof

Administration
- Province: York
- Diocese: Chester
- Archdeaconry: Chester
- Deanery: Chester
- Parish: Tarvin

Clergy
- Vicar: Revd Adam Lyndon David Friend

St Andrew's Church is in the village of Tarvin, Cheshire, England. The church is recorded in the National Heritage List for England as a designated Grade I listed building. It is an active Anglican parish church in the diocese of Chester, the archdeaconry of Chester and the deanery of Chester. Its benefice is united with that of St Peter, Duddon.

== History ==
The original church on the site was built in the 12th century. It was remodelled in the 14th century and the south wall and south arcade date from this time. The remainder of the church was rebuilt in the 15th century and the chancel was restored in the 18th century. The tower was built in the 15th century and the north aisle was added after this. Further restorations took place in the 18th and 19th centuries, followed by one in 1908 by F. P. Oakley.

== Architecture ==
=== Exterior ===
The church is built in red sandstone with a Welsh slate roof. Entry is through the west wall of the west tower. The plan consists of a five-bay nave and a two-bay chancel, a north aisle with a vestry at its east end, and a south aisle with a south porch and the Bruen Chapel at its East end. The doorway to the tower is Tudor in style, the second storey has deeply recessed quatrefoil windows and a clock on all four sides. The top is embattled, and the remains of former pinnacles are at the corners.

=== Interior ===
The nave roof is arch-brace and hammerbeam in design and is dated 1650. It was covered in lath and plaster during the 18th century and its structure was brought to light again in the 1891 restoration. Over the south aisle is a single framed roof dating from 1380, which is the only one of its type in the county. The octagonal font dates from the 15th century. Most of the furniture and fittings were removed during restorations, but the two-tier brass candelabrum dating from the 18th century is still present. In the chancel is a Flemish reredos from around 1500 and a copper memorial tablet to Henry Hardware who died in 1584. The east window of 1892 is by Kempe. The west window was donated in 2006 and was designed by Fiona Banner and Roy Coomber.

At the entrance to the Bruen chapel is a 14th-century wooden screen. On its south wall is a squint with a carved image, known as the "church imp", who looks through the squint. During the first quarter of the 17th century all the pre-Reformation glass was removed from the chapel by John Bruen because he considered it to form "superstitious images and idolatrous pictures". The altar table dates from the 17th century. The chapel contains memorials to John Bruen and others. In the church are five memorial boards which are believed to have been painted by members of the Randle Holme family of Chester. The parish registers begin in 1563 but are incomplete between 1682 and 1687. There is a ring of six bells cast by Thomas Rudhall in 1779.

== External features ==
In the churchyard are six structures that are listed at Grade II. These are the gates and gate piers to the churchyard, a sandstone sundial dating from the mid-18th century, the tombchests of John Minshull and his daughter, William and Elizabeth Hilton, William Sandbach and others, and the tombstone of Beatrix Hollinsworth. The churchyard also contains the war graves of three British soldiers and a Canadian Army soldier of World War I.

== Interments ==
=== Notable gravesites ===
- James Crawfoot, prominent Methodist in the early 19th century

== See also ==
- Grade I listed buildings in Cheshire West and Chester
- Grade I listed churches in Cheshire
- Listed buildings in Tarvin
