= Tarvin in the English Civil War =

During the first English Civil War, Tarvin, a village in Cheshire, England, was garrisoned by both sides and was attacked by both sides, because its proximity to Chester, which was a major Royalist (Cavalier) port city, made it strategically important. Tarvin changed hands several times; initially it was garrisoned by Parliament and troops of both sides at different times were quartered in and around the village, which was not fortified. In September 1644 the Parliamentarians (Roundheads) fortified the village and garrisoned the place with sufficient troops to withstand a large attack and it remained in their hands until the end of the war.

== History ==
On Sunday 12 November 1643, Royalists sallied out of Chester towards Tarvin — which was garrisoned by Parliament under the command of Captain Gerard — but the Royalists were intercepted at Stamford Bridge and prevented from crossing it. The two sides skirmished all the afternoon but then Parliamentary reinforcements from Cholmondeley arrived to assist Gerard and they drove the Royalists back, following them to Boughton and into Gorse Stacks on the outskirts of Chester, where they killed some of them. The Parliamentarians' only casualty was one man wounded.

In late January 1644, some Parliamentary forces billeted in and about Tarvin were taken by surprise in an attack by the Chester Royalists. Some were wounded, and others were taken prisoner but as the Royalists returned to Chester with their captives they were overtaken by a company of Parliamentary dragoons. In the melee that followed, a Royalist captain and some of his men were killed, and others were wounded. The dragoons freed the prisoners and took eight of their own, all of whom were sent to Nantwich.

On Sunday 18 August 1644, Colonel Marrow marched from Chester with a detachment of foot (infantry) and horse (cavalry) towards Northwich, and on the way they took cattle without paying for them. When Morrow's scouts approached Hartford Green, a party of soldiers from the garrison sallied out to chase them off, but the Parliamentary soldiers got too close to the main body. A skirmish ensued at Sandiway. The Royalists won the day, taking fifteen prisoners, but Colonel Marrow was mortally wounded and died the next day in Chester. After the skirmish it seems that the Royalist detachment made for Tarvin, because two days later (Tuesday 20 August) a party of Parliamentarians from Nantwich with the assistance of Sir William Brereton's horse and reinforcements from Halton Castle attacked the Royalists quartered at Tarvin and, for the fifteen prisoners they lost two days earlier, took between 200 and 300 horses, capturing 45 prisoners and killing 15, all for the loss of only one man.

On Friday 30 August 1644, all the Parliamentary garrison of Nantwich, except Major Croxton's and the town's trained bands, marched to Middlewich where they encamped for the night. The next day they proceeded to Northwich and Great Budworth, and then to Tarvin, which they fortified with strong earthworks and garrisoned, declaring it to be a market town. They also garrisoned Huxley Hall and Oulton Hall near Little Budworth. The fortifications and the garrison must have been stronger than others, because Tarvin appears to have been the only garrison in Cheshire, except Nantwich, that was not abandoned on the reported approach of the King in May 1645.

On Monday 9 June 1645, three companies of horse and six of Royalist foot sallied out of Chester and captured the Parliamentary Captain Glegge and his troop of horse before they could escape from their quarters. They were quickly rescued in a counterattack mounted by the Tarvin garrison. The Royalists retreated to the parish of Eaton and Rushton, where near the forest of Delamere they turned to give battle. The Parliamentarians killed ten and captured two captains, some more junior officers and about 210 soldiers with many bags of powder and some 300 firearms. The Parliamentarians' casualties were three killed and taken prisoner. The following day the Royalist prisoners were sent from Tarvin to Nantwich. On 11 June 1645 fourteen or fifteen of the prisoners were tried under a council of war. Three were judged to be Irish and were hanged under the provisions of the Ordinance of no quarter to the Irish.

On 19 September 1645 large pieces of ordinance within the fortifications at Tarvin were moved to Chester to help to batter the city into submission. Within a few hours the artillery pieces had done their work making a breach four men wide in the city wall to the left of the Newgate. At 8 pm that night the city was assaulted through the breach and captured.

The church at Tarvin shows signs of its part in the battles. There are cannonball and musket ball holes in the wall of St Andrew's church tower next to the west door. It has been said that prisoners were shot against this wall, which explains some of the bullet holes. The church was also used as a refuge by soldiers and the tower was probably used as a lookout post.
