= Burton (near Tarporley) =

Village in Cheshire, England

Coordinates: 53.169472°N 2.733960°W

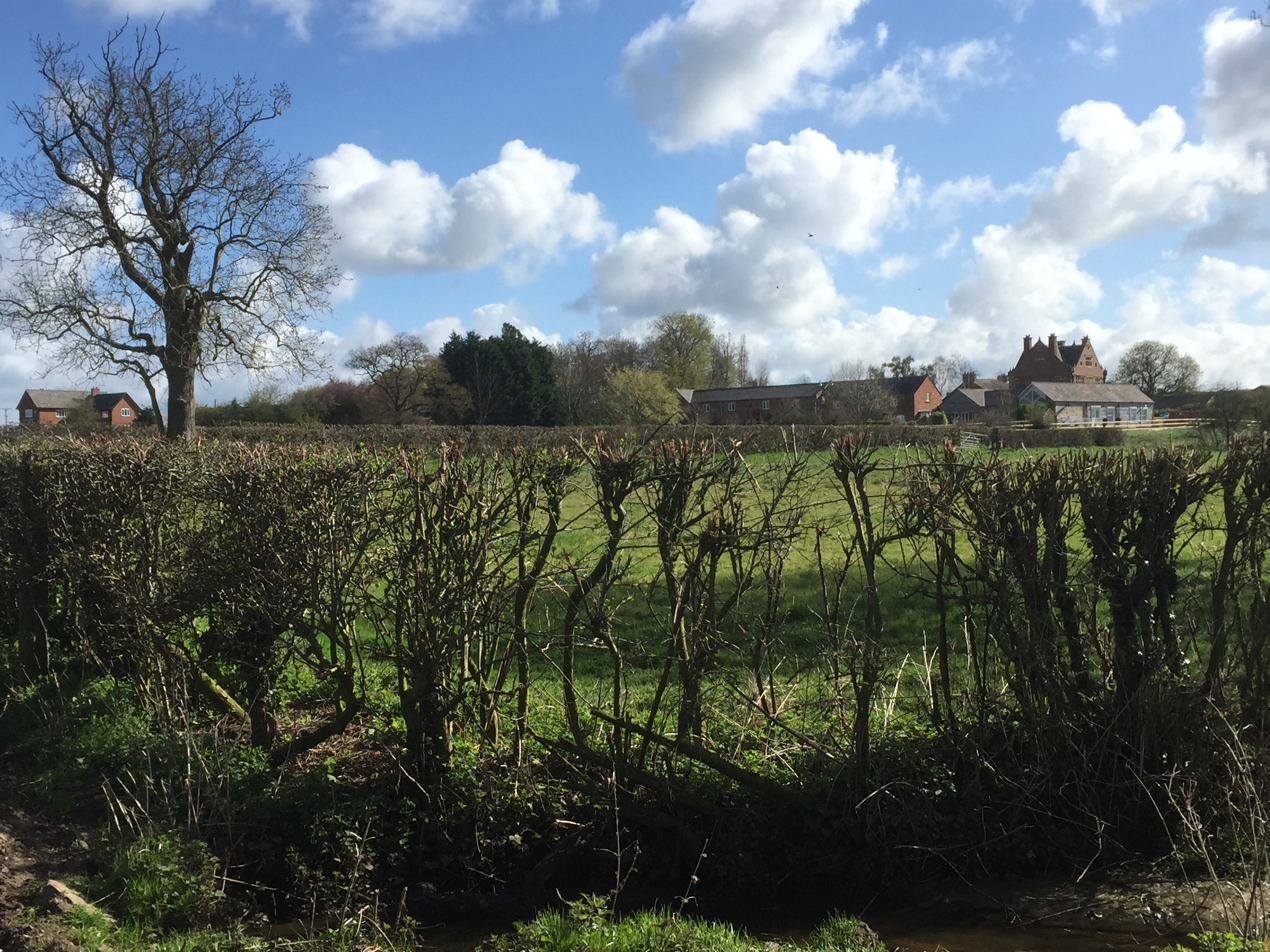
- Burton from the fields to the west of the village

- Location within Cheshire
- Population: 50 (2001 census)
- OS grid reference: SJ510638
- Civil parish: Duddon and Burton
- Unitary authority: Cheshire West and Chester
- Ceremonial county: Cheshire
- Region: North West
- Country: England
- Sovereign state: United Kingdom
- Post town: Tarporley
- Postcode district: CW6
- Dialling code: 01829
- Police: Cheshire
- Fire: Cheshire
- Ambulance: North West
- UK Parliament: Chester South and Eddisbury

Burton is a small village and former civil parish, now in the parish of Duddon and Burton, in the unitary authority of Cheshire West and Chester and the ceremonial county of Cheshire, England. In the 2001 census, the parish had a population of 50.

== History ==
The name Burton means "fortified farm/settlement" and likely derives from the Old English words burh (a fortified place) and tūn (a farmstead or settlement).

The village was mentioned in the Domesday Book of 1086 as Burtone, under the direct ownership of the Bishop of Chester. The entry records a population of thirteen households, consisting of seven villagers, four smallholders, one priest and one 'rider'. Burton is also referenced on Christopher Saxton's map of Cheshire from 1577.

== Location ==
The village is about 2 miles (3.2 km) south east of Tarvin and 3 miles (4.8 km) west of Tarporley. It lies on Burton Road, with the villages of Duddon to the north and Hoofield to the south. The River Gowy passes approximately 1 mile (1.6 km) to the south west of Burton.

The Eddisbury Way footpath passes through the village.

The village is surrounded by undulating pasture and contains three dairy farms: Burton Farm, Holly Farm and Home Farm. The village is dominated by Burton Hall.

== Governance ==
Burton falls within the unitary authority of Cheshire West and Chester and the Westminster constituency of Chester South and Eddisbury.

Until 2015, although Burton was classified as a civil parish, it had neither a parish council nor a parish meeting, and, consequently, the duties that would normally be performed by these bodies were the responsibility of Cheshire West and Chester Council. On 1 April 2015, Burton parish was merged with Duddon parish to create a new, larger, Duddon parish. On 1 July 2017 the new Burton parish was renamed to Duddon and Burton.

Burton-by-Tarvin was formerly a township in the parish of Tarvin, in 1866 Burton by Tarvin became a separate civil parish,

== Landmarks ==
Burton Hall is largely an early 17th-century brick and sandstone house, which was designated a Grade II* listed building in 1952.

== See also ==
- Listed buildings in Burton (near Tarporley)
