= Listed buildings in Duddon =

Duddon is a former civil parish, now in the parish of Duddon and Burton, in Cheshire West and Chester, England. It contains 13 buildings that are recorded in the National Heritage List for England as designated listed buildings, all of which are at Grade II. This grade is the lowest of the three gradings given to listed buildings and is applied to "buildings of national importance and special interest". Apart from the village of Duddon, the parish is entirely rural. All the listed buildings are houses, or are related to farming.

Name and location	Photograph	Date	Notes
Barn, Duddon Old Hall; 53.1774°N 2.7261°W	—	16th century	Originally a threshing barn, additions were made in the 19th century. The building is timber-framed, with brick nogging and some weatherboarding, on a stone plinth. The later additions are in brick and stone. It has two storeys, and a five-bay front. It contains doors and pitch holes.
Duddon Old Hall; 53.1772°N 2.7264°W	—	Late 16th century	The house is constructed partly in timber-framing and partly in brick on a stone plinth. It is roofed with slates and stone-slates. The house consists of a hall and a cross-wing, is in two storeys, and has a four-bay front. The left bay is timber-framed, projects forwards, and has a gable and a bargeboard. All the windows are casements.
Laurel Farmhouse; 53.1767°N 2.7280°W	—	Early 17th century	The farmhouse was extended in the early 19th century. It is partly timber-framed, with brick and brick nogging, on a stone plinth, and partly in brick. The house is thatched, is in a single storey with an attic, and has a three-bay front. The windows are casements.
The Green; 53.1782°N 2.7296°W	—	Early 17th century	Originally a farmhouse, this was later altered and extended. The older part is timber-framed on a stone plinth, the later part is in brick; it has a slate roof. It is in a single storey with an attic, and has a five-bay front. The windows are casements.
Duddon Lodge; 53.1783°N 2.7349°W	—	Early to mid-19th century	A stuccoed house with a hipped slate roof. It has a double pile plan. It has a symmetrical three-bay front, and is in two storeys. In the central bay is a Tuscan style porch with a flat entablature. The rear is in three storeys. All the windows are sashes.

== See also ==
- Listed buildings in Clotton Hoofield
- Listed buildings in Huxley
- Listed buildings in Foulk Stapleford
- Listed buildings in Willington
- Listed buildings in Tarvin
