= Listed buildings in Burton (near Tarporley) =

Burton is a former civil parish, now in the parish of Duddon and Burton, in Cheshire West and Chester, England. It contains two buildings that are recorded in the National Heritage List for England as designated listed buildings. These consist of a country house, and an associated wall and gateway.

== Key ==
Grade	Criteria
Grade II*	Particularly important buildings of more than special interest.
Grade II	Buildings of national importance and special interest.

== Buildings ==
Name and location	Photograph	Date	Notes	Grade
Burton Hall; 53.1704°N 2.7365°W		Early 17th century	This is a country house constructed in brick with sandstone dressings and a slate roof. It has a square plan, is in three storeys with a basement, and has a symmetrical three-bay front under a gable with a finial. The door is approached by ten steps. The windows are mullioned and transomed.	II*
Garden wall and gateway, Burton Hall; 53.16994°N 2.73635°W		Early 17th century	The wall is constructed in brick on a sandstone base with triangular coping. It incorporates a stone archway with a moulded semicircular head.	II
