= Leonel Sharp =

Leonel Sharp (or Lionel Sharpe; 1559–1631) was an English churchman and courtier, a royal chaplain and archdeacon of Berkshire, imprisoned for sedition in 1614. As a writer he took a strong anti-papal and anti-Spanish line.

== Life ==
He was second son of Robert Sharpe, a merchant, of London, and of Julian, eldest daughter of Sir Richard Mallorie, lord mayor. He entered Eton College in 1576, and proceeded as fellow to King's College, Cambridge. He graduated B.A. in 1581, M.A. in 1584, and received from the university the degree of D.D. before 1603. He was incorporated at Oxford on 12 October 1618.

In 1588 he was present at Tilbury camp in the capacity of chaplain to Robert Devereux, 2nd Earl of Essex, and was chosen, as he states, to repeat Queen Elizabeth's oration to the whole army assembled there. In 1589 and in 1596 he accompanied Essex in his expeditions to Cádiz and Portugal. In 1590 Sharp became rector of Malpas, Cheshire, and in 1597 of Tiverton and Stoke-in-Teignhead in Devon. When Essex was executed for treason, Sharp was banished to his Devon parishes. In May 1601, in a letter to Robert Cecil, he excused himself, and was soon after appointed a royal chaplain. Sharp celebrated the commencement of James I's reign by a laudatory sermon on Solomon and the queen of Sheba, at St. Mary's. He obtained the patronage of Henry Howard, 1st Earl of Northampton. In 1605 he became archdeacon of Berkshire and rector of North Moreton in that county. He was also about this time appointed chaplain to Henry Frederick, Prince of Wales, and addressed to him a congratulatory epistle to him on his escape from the Gunpowder Plot.

His career at court soon terminated after Prince Henry's death in 1612. Already, in 1606, he had been summoned to clear himself to the council of the suspicion of endeavouring to stir up strife between the English and the Scottish factions at court. In 1614 John Hoskins speaking in parliament concerning Scottish favourites, made an allusion to the Sicilian Vespers. On being called to account he pleaded that he did not understand the nature of his threat, but that it had been suggested to him by Sharp. Both Hoskins and Sharp, together with Sir Charles Cornwallis, who was also implicated, were committed to the Tower of London on 22 June. Sharp's health suffered from confinement, but he was not released till 15 June of the following year. Sharp made several attempts to regain favour by means of obsequious sermons. He also wrote to the king and to various ministers, advocating the adoption of Elizabeth's domestic policy. In 1618, according to Chamberlain, he penned the defence of Sir Lewis Stukeley against the charge of betraying Sir Walter Ralegh. In the same year the university of Oxford conferred on him the honorary degree of D.D. In his later years he resided at Boughton Malherb in Kent, one of his parishes. There he died on 1 January 1631, and was buried in the church, a marble monument marking his grave. About 1597 he had married Ann, daughter of John Chichester of Hall in Devon.

== Works ==
He was the author of:

- Dialogus inter Angliam et Scotiam, Cambridge, 1603.
- Oratio Funebris in honorem Henrici Wall. Prin., 1612, London, with verses by his brothers Edward, Andrew, and William, prefixed; translated into English by Edward Sharp, 1616.
- Novum Fidei Symbolum, 1612, London.
- Speculum Papae, 1612, London.

The last two were jointly translated into English under the title A Looking-glass for the Pope, 1623.

== Sources ==
- This article incorporates text from a publication now in the public domain: Carlyle, Edward Irving (1897). "Sharp, Leonel". In Lee, Sidney (ed.). Dictionary of National Biography. Vol. 51. London: Smith, Elder & Co. pp. 411, 412.
