= Duddon =

Village in Cheshire, England

Coordinates: 53.17°N 02.73°W

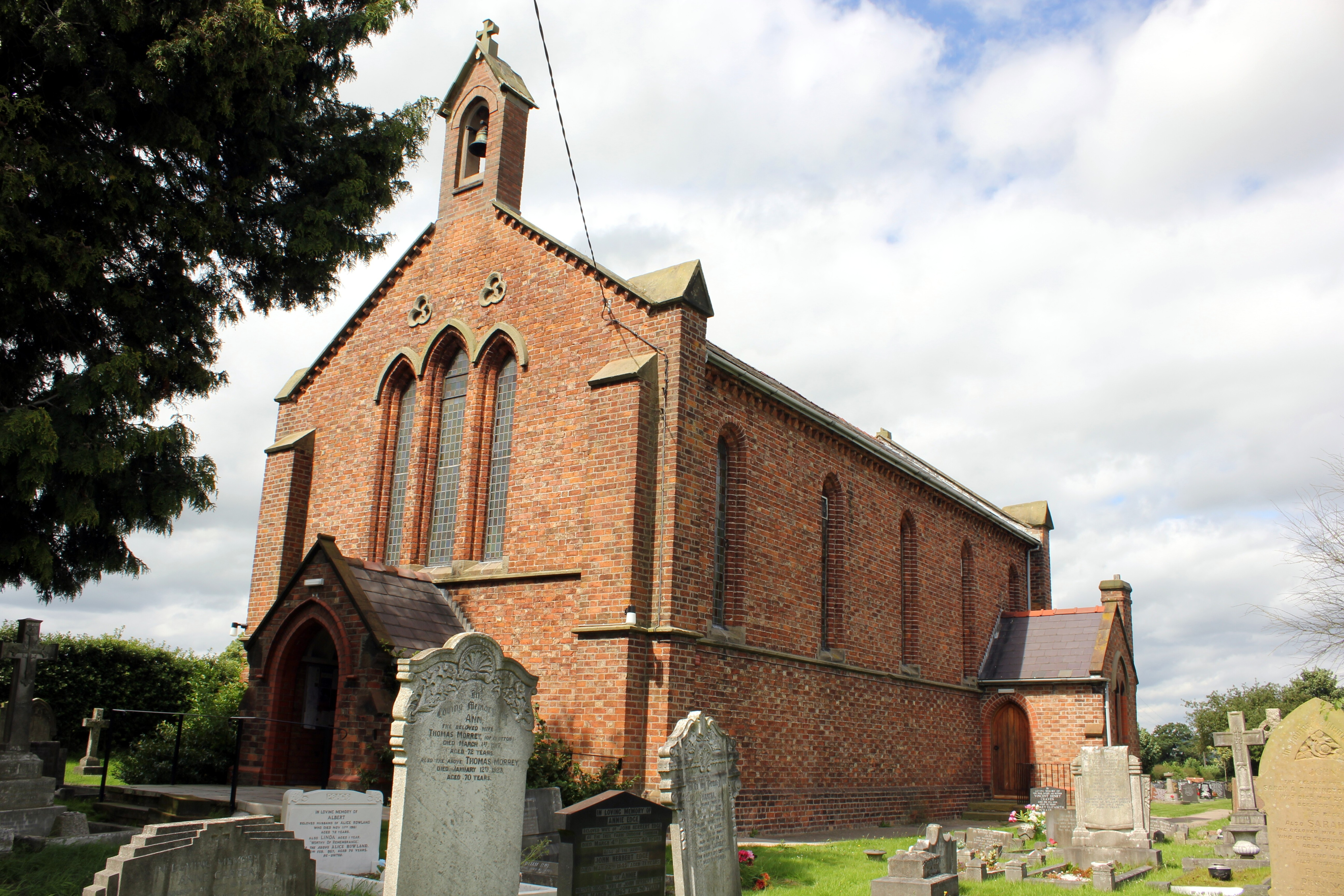

- Location within Cheshire
- Population: 655 (2011)
- OS grid reference: SJ5164
- Civil parish: Duddon and Burton
- Unitary authority: Cheshire West and Chester
- Ceremonial county: Cheshire
- Region: North West
- Country: England
- Sovereign state: United Kingdom
- Post town: Tarporley
- Postcode district: CW6
- Dialling code: 01829
- Police: Cheshire
- Fire: Cheshire
- Ambulance: North West
- UK Parliament: Chester South and Eddisbury.

Duddon is a village and former civil parish, now in the parish of Duddon and Burton, in the unitary authority area of Cheshire West and Chester and the ceremonial county of Cheshire, England. It is on the A51 road and is 8 kilometres (5 mi) east of the city of Chester. Local features include Duddon St. Peter's Church and St. Peter's Primary School. The church was erected in 1835 as a chapel of ease to the parish church at Tarvin. It was built in the early English style at a cost of £603 to the designs of William Railton. In 2011 the parish had a population of 655. The civil parish absorbed Burton on 1 April 2015, and on 1 July 2017 the new parish was renamed to Duddon and Burton.

== Legend of the "Headless Woman" ==
Headless Woman placard at the closed pub

The name of the Headless Woman public house name recalls the local legend of Grace Trigg who died in about 1664. She was a servant at nearby Hockenhull Hall, found hiding in a cellar there by Oliver Cromwell's parliamentarian soldiers after the royalist owners had fled. They tortured her to force her to reveal where the family valuables were hidden and, when she would not tell them, beheaded her in the attic, dragged her body downstairs and dumped it off one of the "Roman Bridges" (three medieval packhorse bridges on the River Gowy, still standing today at the end of Platts Lane in Hockenhull).

Legend has it that, 250 years following her beheading, the inn's owners, after researching the story, ascended to the attic to discover the bloodstains were still present where she had been killed. For nearly 300 years, her ghost has been reported to wander the roads about Duddon, visiting the local park and bridges, and has been seen returning to her place of execution at the Headless Woman pub. Local farmers have reported seeing her ghost walking through rows of maize. She reportedly carries her severed head beneath her arm. The most common sightings of her ghost have been at the Roman Bridges in Hockenhull. In 2009, a professional paranormal investigation took place at the pub and bridges by local investigators to gather evidence of her ghost. With their instruments, they were able to detect unexplained sounds and other pieces of evidence that could reveal her actual presence. The pub was demolished in 2014.

== See also ==
- Listed buildings in Duddon
- Duddon Old Hall
