= Bruen Stapleford =

Former civil parish in Cheshire, England

Coordinates: 53.178°N 2.759°W

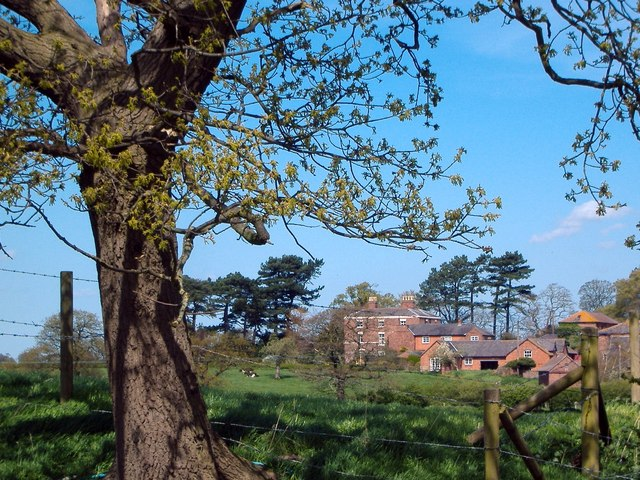
- Stapleford Hall, Bruen Stapleford

- Location within Cheshire
- Population: 186 (2011)
- Civil parish: Tarvin
- Unitary authority: Cheshire West and Chester
- Ceremonial county: Cheshire
- Region: North West
- Country: England
- Sovereign state: United Kingdom
- Post town: CHESTER
- Postcode district: CH3
- Dialling code: 01829
- Police: Cheshire
- Fire: Cheshire
- Ambulance: North West
- UK Parliament: Chester South and Eddisbury

Bruen Stapleford is a former civil parish, now in the parish of Tarvin in the unitary authority area of Cheshire West and Chester and the ceremonial county of Cheshire, England. According to the 2001 census it had a population of 66, rising to 186 at the 2011 Census.

== History ==
A prehistoric settlement of six roundhouses has been excavated near Brook House Farm. It was occupied from the Middle Bronze Age to the end of the Iron Age (approximately 1000 BC to 42 AD).

Bruen-Stapleford was formerly a township in the parish of Tarvin, in 1866 Bruen Stapleford became a separate civil parish, on 1 April 2015 the parish was abolished and merged with Tarvin. From 1974 to 2009 it was in Chester district.

== See also ==
- Listed buildings in Bruen Stapleford
