= Tarvin =

Village in Cheshire, England

Coordinates: 53.1949°N 2.7668°W

- Location within Cheshire
- Population: 2,728 (2011)
- OS grid reference: SJ491669
- Civil parish: Tarvin
- Unitary authority: Cheshire West and Chester
- Ceremonial county: Cheshire
- Region: North West
- Country: England
- Sovereign state: United Kingdom
- Post town: CHESTER
- Postcode district: CH3
- Dialling code: 01829
- Police: Cheshire
- Fire: Cheshire
- Ambulance: North West
- UK Parliament: Chester South and Eddisbury

Tarvin is a village in the unitary authority of Cheshire West and Chester and the ceremonial county of Cheshire, England. It had a population of 2,693 people at the 2001 UK census, rising to 2,728 at the 2011 census, and the ward covers about 17 square miles (44 km^{2}).

== Location and context ==
Tarvin is about 6 miles (9.7 km) east of Chester.

The current parish covers Tarvin, Duddon, Clotton, Stapleford, Burton, Hoofield and Oscroft.

There are currently 28 listed buildings in Tarvin (one Grade I Listed, two Grade II* Listed, and twenty-five Grade II Listed). The centre of the village is a Conservation Area that was created in 1972, and much of the land surrounding the village is designated Green Belt.

== Geology ==
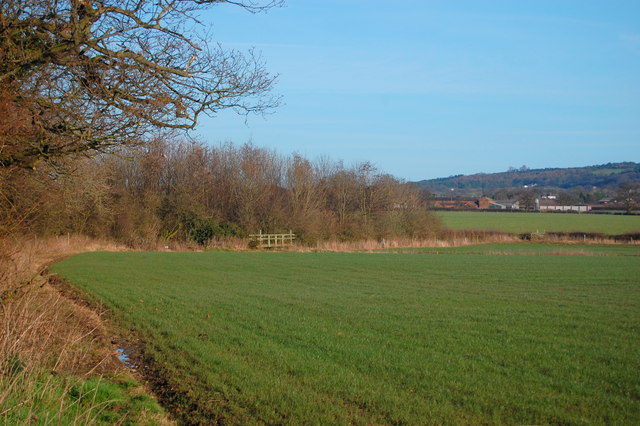
Green Belt surrounding Tarvin

The Cheshire Plain (sometimes known as the Cheshire Gap) is a relatively flat expanse of lowland, which supports agricultural use for dairy farming on the medium-scale pastoral fields that surround the village. Tarvin is west of a sandstone ridge that divides the Cheshire Plain.

The River Gowy passes to the south-west of the village at Hockenhull Platts. There are three packhorse bridges, the Grade II Listed Roman Bridges, within an area classed as a nature reserve.

== Early history ==
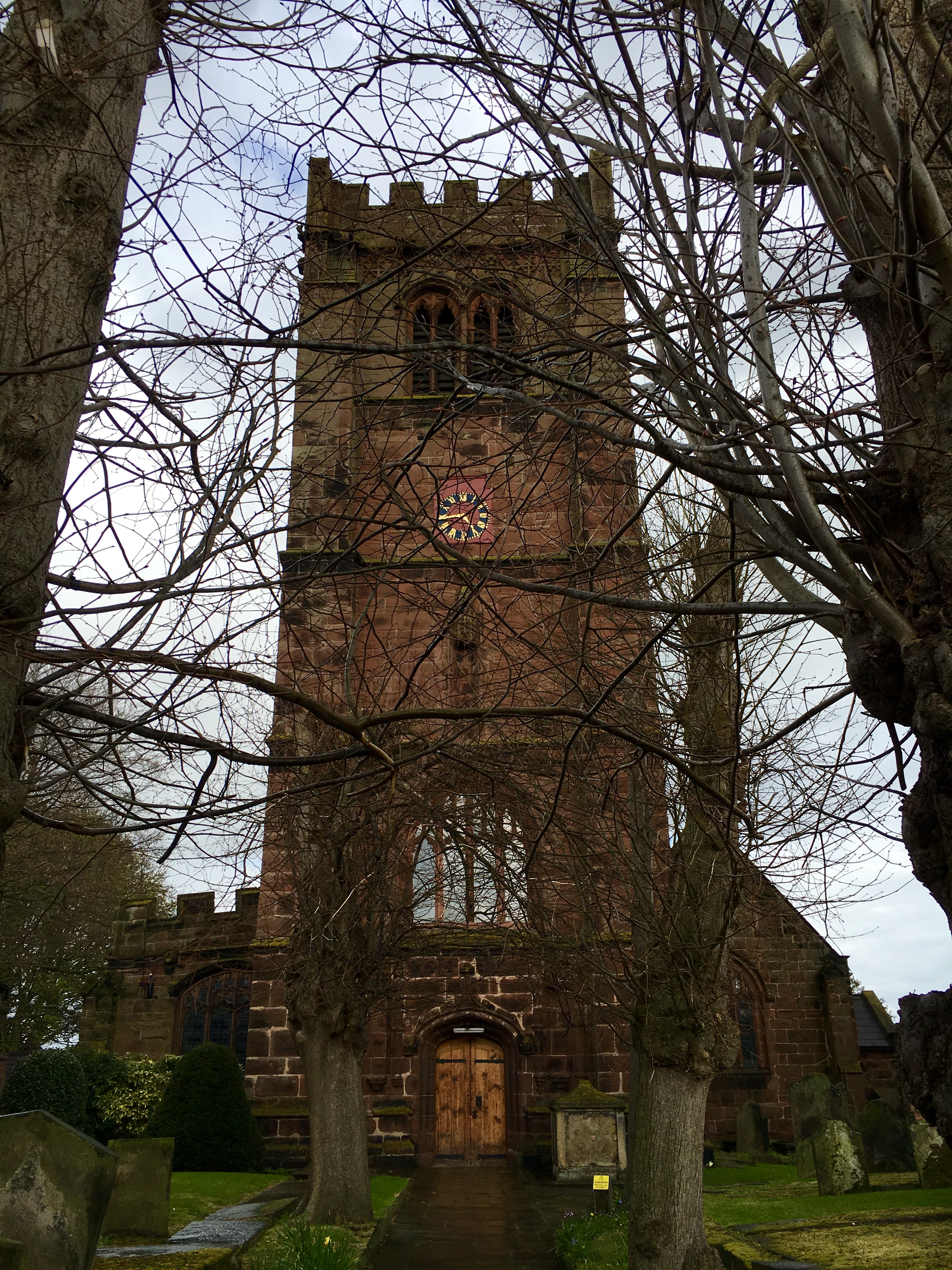
St Andrew's Church, Tarvin

Around 76 AD, the Romans started to build a fortress in Chester. They built a road from Deva (Chester) to Condate (Northwich) which passed Tarvin about a kilometre to the north. The Romans may have used Tarvin, being high ground close to the Roman road, as a Roman coin of Constantius 1 (AD 293–305) was found in the area and other finds in other nearby villages reinforce the evidence of the Romans' presence in the area. West of Tarvin the Roman road crosses the River Gowy. Apparently, in earlier times, this river was called the Tarvin. It is suggested that the name Tarvin comes from the Brittonic word for boundary, which is still present in the Welsh language as tervyn/terfyn and could have resulted from the Latin terminus being incorporated into Brittonic. The boundary could refer to the eastern extent of the Roman prata legionis, the land annexed by the Romans (from the Cornovii) to support their fortress at Chester. The Gowy was later the boundary between the Saxon land divisions (hundreds) in this area, which was a part of the Kingdom of Mercia known as the Wreocensæte.

A Saxon cross dating to the 10th/11th century has been unearthed by archaeologists in Tarvin. The find, made in a Civil War trench, is very rare. The Saxon cross may have been broken up before the assault of Chester in 1645 by the Parliamentary garrison.

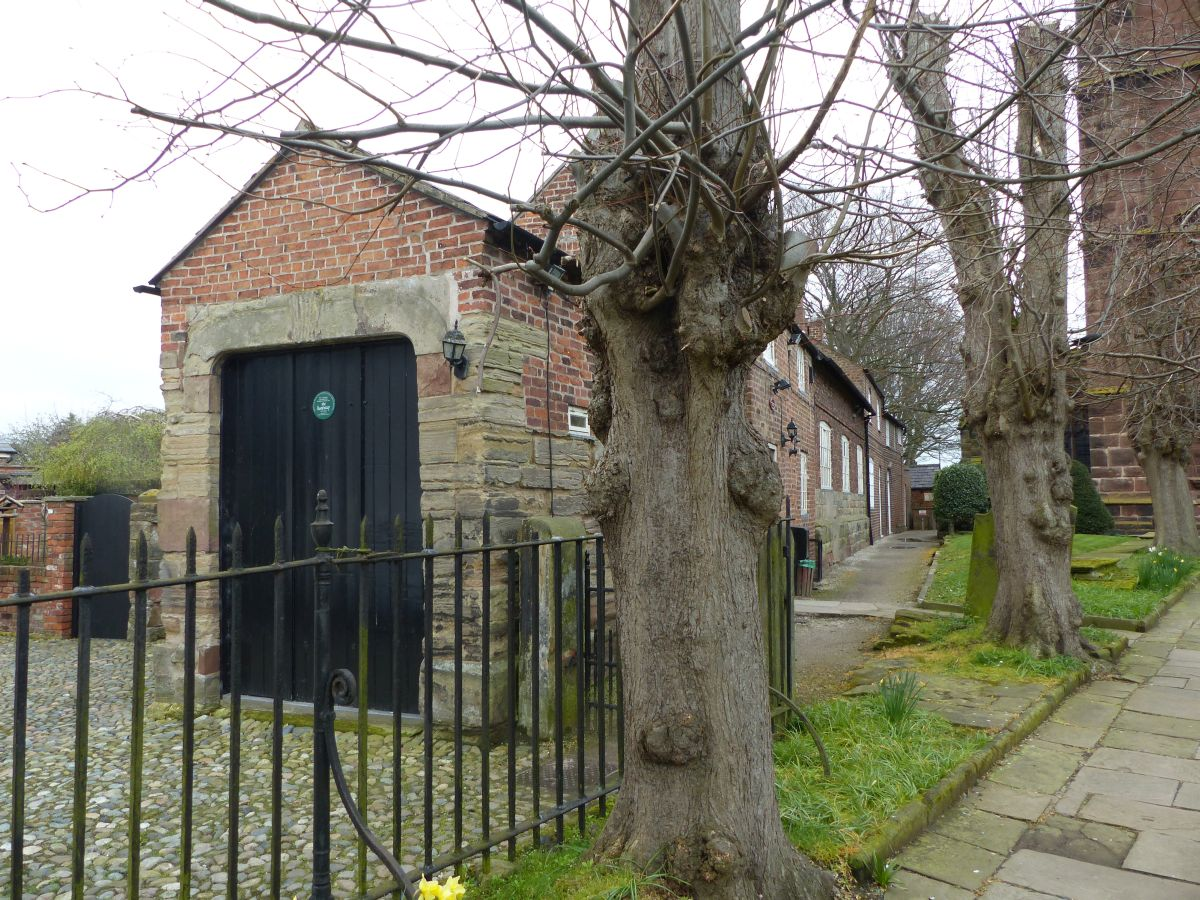
The Old Grammar School, Tarvin

Tarvin appears as a substantial manor in the Domesday Book of 1086 (listed as Terve), the largest community in the Hundred of Rushton with 30 households. Tarvin Manor comprises some 2000 acres of cultivable land (22 ploughlands) as well as 'woodland'. The Domesday Book records the Lord of Tarvin Manor in 1066 as the bishop of Chester St John, and the same in 1086 but adds the name William Malbank, who was named as Lord or Tenant-in-Chief across over 100 manors in Cheshire after the conquest. According to Ormerod "Tarvin is one of the few Cheshire manors which experienced no change in its proprietor at the Conquest, being the property of the Bishop of the diocese, who retained his former possessions after that event." (The nearby Manor of Burton was also to stay the property of the Bishop of St John's.) Although the manors stayed with the bishops, the bishops changed to Norman appointees. Bishop Peter moved from Lichfield to Chester St John's in 1075, and upgraded St John's to cathedral status (Lichfield was the ecclesiastical centre of the Kingdom of Mercia since 669). He died in 1085 and was succeeded in December 1085 by Bishop Robert de Limesey who moved the bishop's seat to Coventry circa 1102, whereupon St John's became a co-cathedral.

Ormerod states that the Domesday Book reports devastation at Tarvin and suggests that this might have arisen due to a stand being taken at Tarvin as the Normans advanced on Chester. The adjacent manor of Barrow, with 8 ploughlands, is listed as having William Son of Nigel as its Lord. Barrow later came to fall within the parish of Tarvin, and was described as a 'free chapel within the prebend of Tarvin' until the 16th century, some time after which it became a separate parish. Although Tarvin was within Rushton Hundred at the time of the Norman conquest, from the end of the 12th century over a prolonged period there was a reorganisation of the hundreds associated with the formation of Lancashire, and transfer of some hundreds to Wales (Atiscross, Exestan, and part of Dudestan), and Tarvin became associated with the Eddisbury Hundred. The hundreds of Cheshire from this time were Broxton, Bucklow, Eddisbury, Macclesfield, Nantwich, Northwich and Wirral.

Apart from Terve and the current name Tarvin, the village has also been referred to as Tervyn (e.g. in records of an assault on a monk in 1326) and Terfyn in the accounts of a trip from Chester to London in 1811, in which is it again suggested that Terfyn comes from the "British" word for "boundary", though in this case it is suggested this might refer to the boundary of Delamere Forest.

In circa 1226 Alexander de Stavenby bishop of Lichfield founded the prebend of Tarvin which, at £26 13s 4d, was the highest endowment of Lichfield Cathedral. The prebend occurs at a similar date to the changes to the borders of Cheshire due to yielding some hundreds to Wales; furthermore Bishop Alexander de Stavenby was a diplomat acting for King Henry III both with France and spent time in Wales trying to renew truces. As the disputed Hundred of Dudestan (Duddeston) included manors only a few miles from Tarvin, such as Christleton, Waverton and Stapleford, the choice of Tarvin for the prebend (apart from it already being an episcopal manor) may have been carefully chosen to be on a boundary, but not as suggested above a boundary with the Forest of Delamere, but on the boundary between England and the disputed parts of the England/Wales border. These were the days of Llywelyn who was reported to have a strong alliance with the 6th Earl of Chester.

Ormerod's accounts show that this relationship between Tarvin and the Bishops of Lichfield and Coventry (the two bishoprics were merged in 1228) became long term, and continued until 10 April 1550 (well into the English Reformation), when "Richard, bishop of Coventry and Lichfield, granted this manor to Sir John Savage".

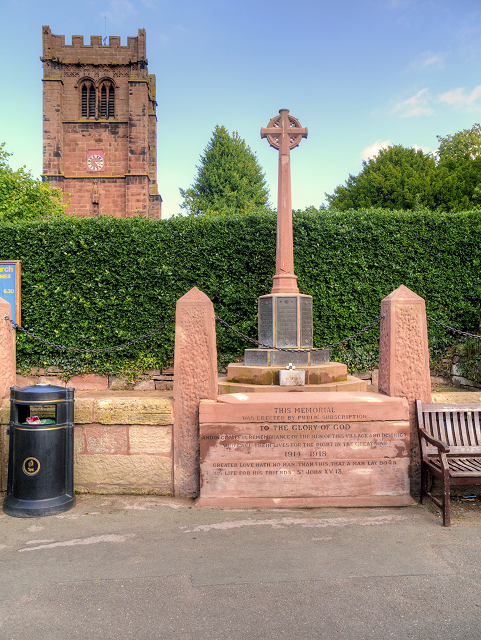
War Memorial outside St Andrew's Church

Under Sir John Savage, Tarvin was elevated to a market town.

=== Grammar School ===
Tarvin Grammar School was founded by Randall Pickering junr., a freeman of the Haberdasher's Company living in St Martin Pomary, London, whose father was born in Tarvin. Having given £40 in his lifetime for the building of a schoolhouse, his will of 1641 gave a further £20 for the finishing of it, the first schoolmaster to be nominated and chosen by his two executors, who were also his kinsmen. The will also provided an endowment of £200 for purchase of lands, the rents from which were to support the school: lands were purchased in Tattenhall. The number of children was limited to 20 (of whom 6 to be from the 'towne of Tarvin' and the rest 'in the other townes belonging to the parish of Tarvin'), and there was a house for the master. The ten feoffees for the management of the trust were to be inhabitants of the town. One of the masters (for 36 years) was John Thomasen (died 1740, aged 54), described as the finest penman in England, especially known for his transcriptions of the Greek poets in authentic characters: in 1714 he produced a handwritten copy of the Eikon Basilike for Queen Anne.

The grammar school survived until final closure in 1939. Restored in 1997, the building is to the left approaching the entrance to St. Andrew's church, and is used as parish rooms. The endowment survives and individual grants from it are available via the Tarvin Educational Foundation (registered charity 525966) "to assist the educational needs of students of secondary school age or older who live in the ancient parish of Tarvin."

== Civil War ==
During the Civil War, because of its proximity to Chester, Tarvin did not escape. The village changed hands several times. Initially it was occupied by Parliamentarians (Roundheads). On 12 November 1643 there was a skirmish between the garrison and Royalist (Cavaliers) from Chester. In January 1644 there was another skirmish. In July 1644 the Cavaliers occupied Tarvin and they beat off a large Roundhead assault. In September the Roundheads captured the place and occupied it with a strong garrison within strong earthworks. The Parliamentary governor of Tarvin was sufficiently confident in the strength of his fortifications and the size of his garrison that he refused to surrender to the Cavaliers even when it was known that Charles I was in the area with an army. Tarvin remained in Roundhead hands until the end of the war. The church shows signs of its part in the battles: there are cannonball and musketball holes in the wall of the church tower next to the west door. It has been said that prisoners were shot against this wall, which explains some of the bullet holes. The church was also used as a refuge by soldiers and the tower was probably used as a lookout post.

== Later history ==
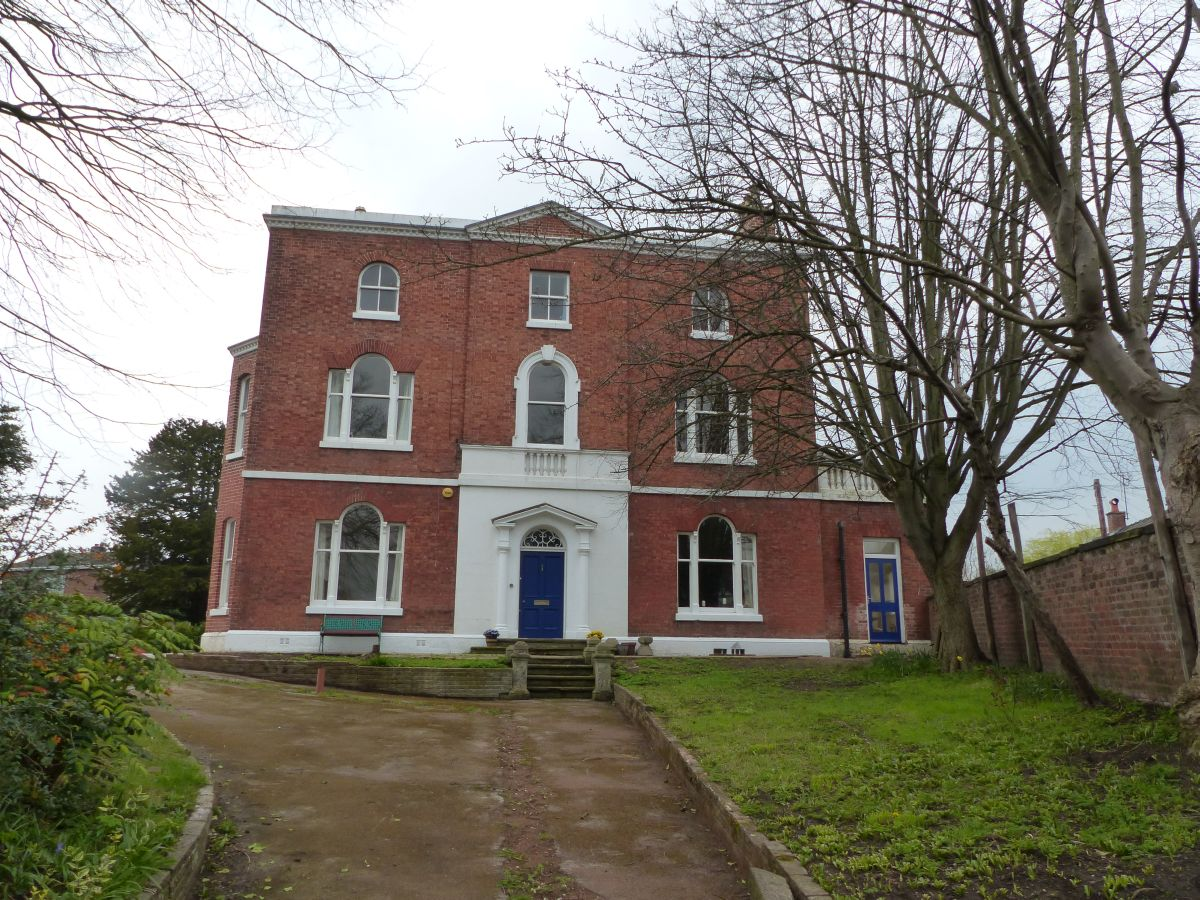
Tarvin Hall

On the last day of April 1752 at about noon, the Great Fire of Tarvin broke out in the north-west part of the village. Fanned by strong winds, the fire burned down the greater part of the place within a couple of hours, leaving the timber-framed buildings of Church Cottages and Bull’s Cottage (opposite Tarvin Hall) standing at its extremities. Remarkably no one died, though several horses were lost, and even the drink in the cellars of some of the inns was destroyed. The City of Chester, by way of a collection from house to house, collected £300 to aid the sufferers. Many of the buildings in Tarvin date from the rebuilding and remodelling in the following years, and little is known of the original village layout, though many of the buildings have their foundations directly cut into the sandstone and these foundations may well pre-date the fire.

In the 18th century England was progressively being covered with turnpike roads (toll roads), which were created by Act of Parliament. The turnpike from Lichfield direction, via Nantwich and Tarporley, was subject to an act in 1769 that decided it would be re-routed via Tarvin instead of the former route to Chester via Stapleford. At the same time the road from Northwich was also re-routed to go via Tarvin.

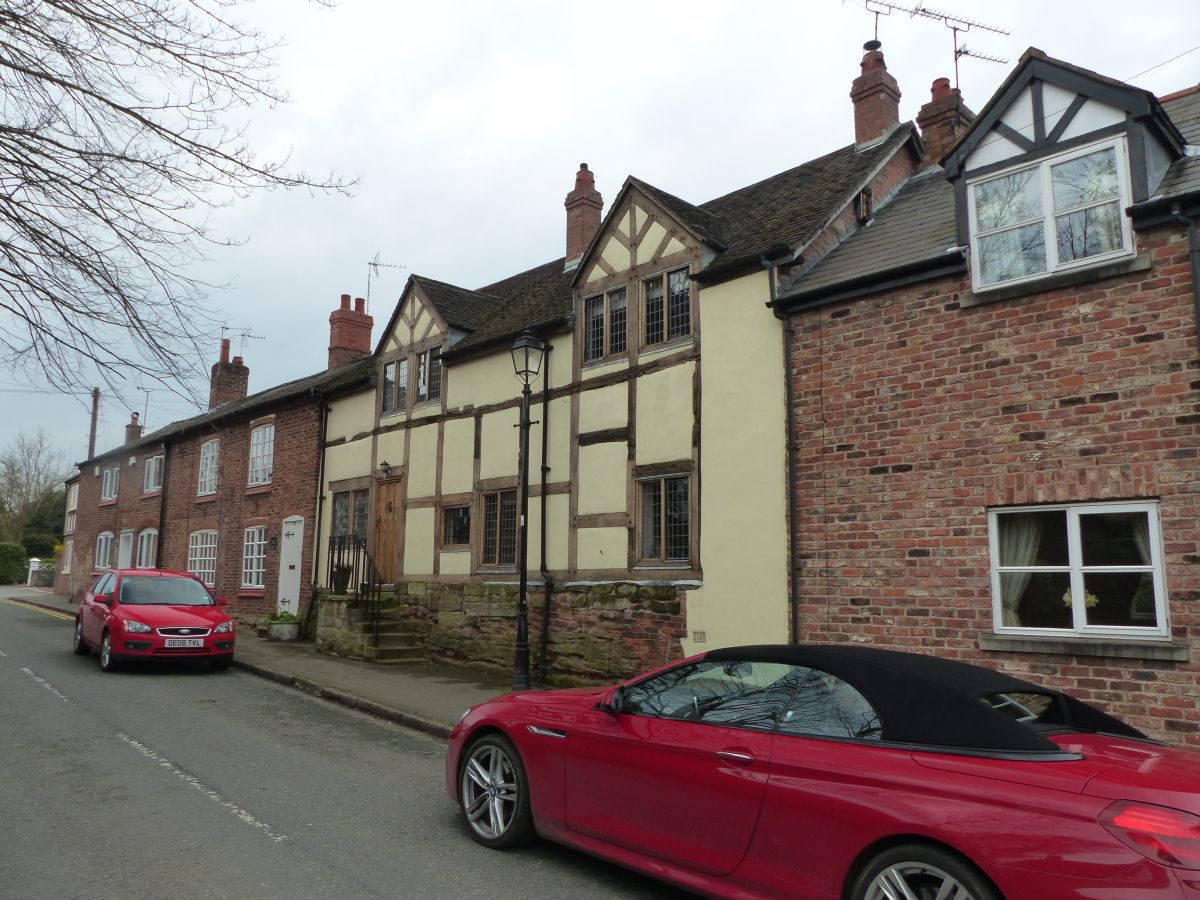
Listed building in Tarvin

George Ormerod lists the populations of local villages in the returns to parliament of 51st year of George III's reign (1811), with 921 in Tarvin, and a total of 2,986 through the parish of Tarvin, which included Ashton, Bruen Stapleford, Burton, Clotton Hoofield, Duddon, Hockenhull, Horton cum Peele, Kelsal (sic), Mouldsworth, Tarvin, and Wildington.

From 1875, Tarvin was indirectly served by Barrow for Tarvin railway station more than two miles (3 km) distant on the Cheshire Lines Committee route from Chester to Manchester; the line remains open but the station closed in June 1953, though it still stands albeit in poor condition and is now privately owned.

In the 1960s the village was expanded substantially and there was a major influx of the young families of white-collar workers from the major companies in the area.

== Present day ==
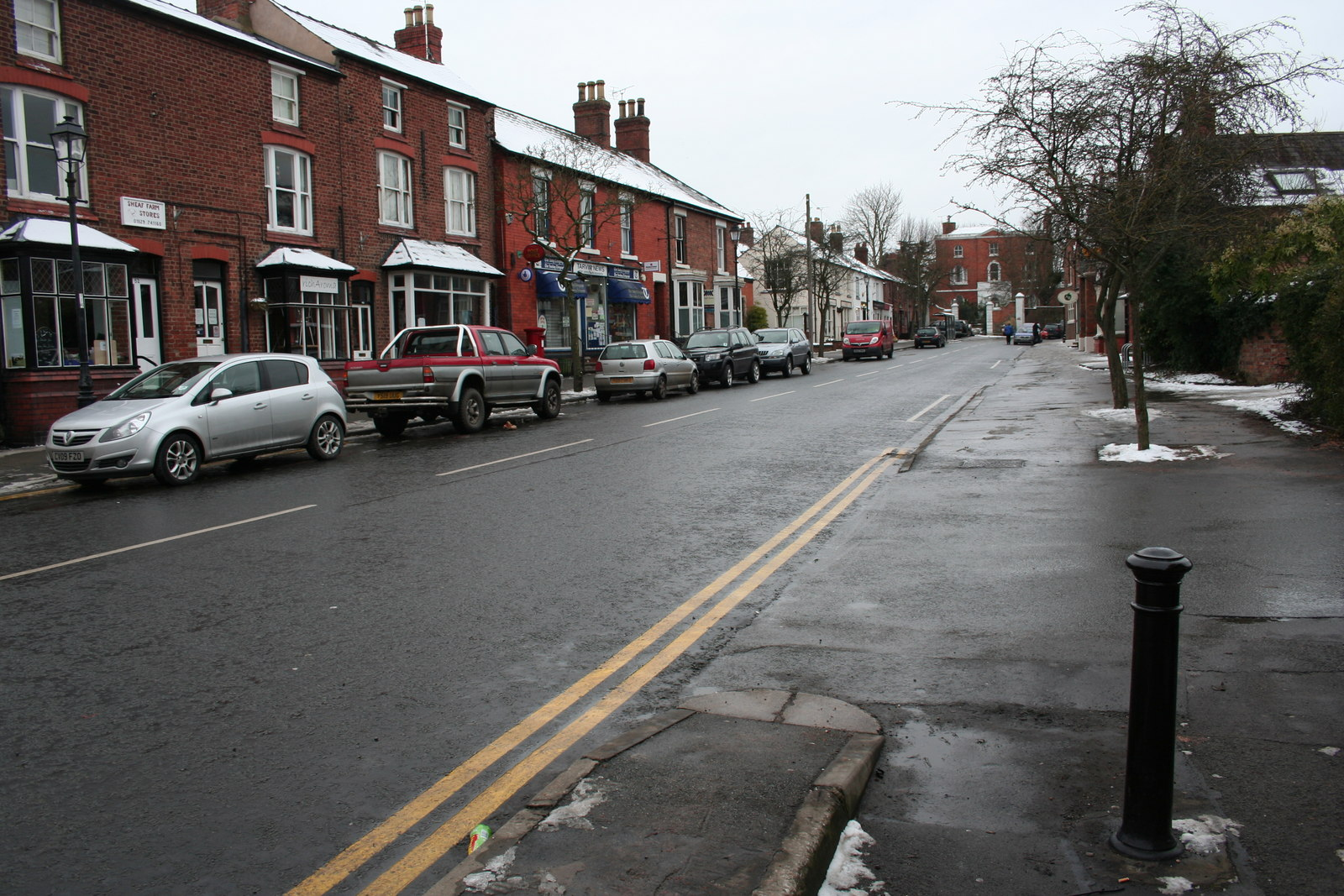
High Street, Tarvin

The Tarvin Neighbourhood Plan is currently being drafted, with informal consultation due to take place in 2018. Following this, a statutory consultation is required to take place before a Parish referendum.

A Village Design Statement has also been produced, which looks to ensure that both buildings and landscape are in keeping with the existing character of the Village.

St Andrew's Church is an Anglican, Grade I Listed parish church in the diocese of Chester located in the village. The current vicar is Revd Adam Lyndon David Friend.

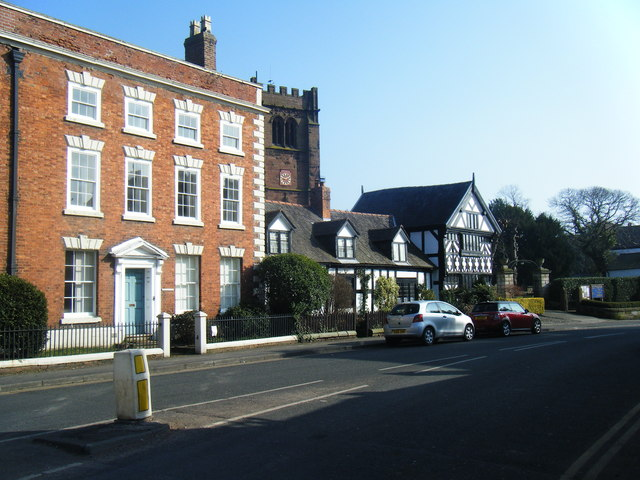
Church Street, Tarvin

The Tarvin Community Woodland runs for about 1.5 kilometres (0.93 mi) alongside the A51, and covers 13 acres (5.3 ha), with a footpath and a bridleway. In 1997, the land was granted to Tarvin Parish Council as a public amenity by the Highways Agency, as it was at the time. This was the first example of using surplus Highways Agency land for the benefit of the community. The first trees were planted in 1997 to commemorate those who lost their lives from the village during the First and Second World Wars. In 2008, the Community Woodland Trust became a charitable trust. In 2017, the Community Woodland received a Green Flag Award, the mark of a quality park or green space, for the eighth consecutive year. In 2015, the woodland was further extended, and in 2016 the Community Woodland Trust became a not-for-profit company limited by guarantee, taking ownership of both the freeholds from Cheshire West and Chester Council of the existing land, and Taylor Wimpey from the extended woodland.

Tarvin Online is a community-run social media and website forum that provides the latest news and information in the Village.

== Transport ==
Tarvin is near the junction of the A51, towards Nantwich and Tarporley, and the A54, towards Northwich and Manchester. These two main trunk roads bypass the village centre on either side. The northerly A54 bypass was constructed in 1933, and the southerly A51 bypass in 1984.

The village is served by two bus services operated by Arriva. The C82 service connects Tarvin to Chester and Northwich, and the C84 service to Chester, Tarporley, and Crewe. The nearest railway station is at Mouldsworth, with services to Chester and Manchester.

== Governance ==
Tarvin is part of the parliamentary constituency of Chester South and Eddisbury, represented since the 2024 general election by Aphra Brandreth of the Conservative Party. It was previously part of the Eddisbury constituency, which had been represented by Conservative Party MPs since its re-establishment in 1983, apart from a brief period in 2019 when the sitting MP Antoinette Sandbach had the Conservative whip removed and eventually sat as a Liberal Democrat before losing her seat to the Conservative Edward Timpson in the 2019 general election.

The village is in the Tarvin and Kelsall electoral ward as part of the Cheshire West and Chester Council. This ward stretches north east to Oakmere with a total population of 8,217.

Tarvin Parish Council consists of 10 elected councillors. The Parish Council has some limited local government autonomy. It represents the village's needs, priorities and objectives to Cheshire West and Chester Council.

== See also ==
- Listed buildings in Tarvin
- Tarvin in the English Civil War
- Tarvin Rural District
