= Listed buildings in Cheshire =

Historic structures in Cheshire, England

The county of Cheshire, England, has many buildings that have been listed.

== Grades I and II* ==
- Grade I listed buildings in Cheshire
- Grade II* listed buildings in Cheshire

== Listed buildings by parished and non-parished areas ==
- Listed buildings in Acton, Cheshire
- Listed buildings in Acton Bridge
- Listed buildings in Adlington, Cheshire
- Listed buildings in Agden, Cheshire West and Chester
- Listed buildings in Alderley Edge
- Listed buildings in Aldersey
- Listed buildings in Aldford
- Listed buildings in Allostock
- Listed buildings in Alpraham
- Listed buildings in Alsager
- Listed buildings in Alvanley
- Listed buildings in Anderton with Marbury
- Listed buildings in Antrobus
- Listed buildings in Appleton, Cheshire
- Listed buildings in Ashley, Cheshire
- Listed buildings in Ashton Hayes
- Listed buildings in Aston by Budworth
- Listed buildings in Aston-by-Sutton
- Listed buildings in Aston juxta Mondrum
- Listed buildings in Audlem
- Listed buildings in Austerson
- Listed buildings in Backford
- Listed buildings in Baddiley
- Listed buildings in Baddington
- Listed buildings in Barnton, Cheshire
- Listed buildings in Barrow, Cheshire
- Listed buildings in Barthomley
- Listed buildings in Barton, Cheshire
- Listed buildings in Batherton
- Listed buildings in Beeston, Cheshire
- Listed buildings in Betchton
- Listed buildings in Bickerton, Cheshire
- Listed buildings in Bickley, Cheshire
- Listed buildings in Birchwood
- Listed buildings in Bollington
- Listed buildings in Bosley
- Listed buildings in Bostock
- Listed buildings in Bradley, Cheshire
- Listed buildings in Bradwall
- Listed buildings in Brereton, Cheshire
- Listed buildings in Brindley
- Listed buildings in Broomhall
- Listed buildings in Broxton, Cheshire
- Listed buildings in Bruen Stapleford
- Listed buildings in Buerton, Cheshire West and Chester
- Listed buildings in Buerton, Cheshire East
- Listed buildings in Bulkeley
- Listed buildings in Bunbury, Cheshire
- Listed buildings in Burland
- Listed buildings in Burton (near Tarporley)
- Listed buildings in Burton (near Neston)
- Listed buildings in Burtonwood and Westbrook
- Listed buildings in Burwardsley
- Listed buildings in Byley
- Listed buildings in Calveley
- Listed buildings in Capenhurst
- Listed buildings in Carden, Cheshire
- Listed buildings in Caughall
- Listed buildings in Checkley cum Wrinehill
- Listed buildings in Chelford
- Listed buildings in Chester Castle parish
- Grade II listed buildings in Chester (central)
- Grade II listed buildings in Chester (east)
- Grade II listed buildings in Chester (north and west)
- Grade II listed buildings in Chester (south)
- Listed buildings in Cholmondeley, Cheshire
- Listed buildings in Chorley, Alderley
- Listed buildings in Chorley, Cholmondeley
- Listed buildings in Chorlton, Cheshire West and Chester
- Listed buildings in Chorlton-by-Backford
- Listed buildings in Christleton
- Listed buildings in Church Lawton
- Listed buildings in Church Minshull
- Listed buildings in Church Shocklach
- Listed buildings in Churton by Aldford
- Listed buildings in Churton by Farndon
- Listed buildings in Clotton Hoofield
- Listed buildings in Clutton, Cheshire
- Listed buildings in Coddington, Cheshire
- Listed buildings in Comberbach
- Listed buildings in Congleton
- Listed buildings in Cotton Edmunds
- Listed buildings in Cranage
- Listed buildings in Crewe
- Listed buildings in Crewe Green
- Listed buildings in Croft, Cheshire
- Listed buildings in Crowton
- Listed buildings in Cuddington, Cheshire
- Listed buildings in Culcheth and Glazebury
- Listed buildings in Darnhall
- Listed buildings in Davenham
- Listed buildings in Delamere, Cheshire
- Listed buildings in Disley
- Listed buildings in Dodcott cum Wilkesley
- Listed buildings in Doddington, Cheshire
- Listed buildings in Dodleston
- Listed buildings in Duckington
- Listed buildings in Duddon
- Listed buildings in Dunham on the Hill
- Listed buildings in Dutton, Cheshire
- Listed buildings in Eaton, Cheshire East
- Listed buildings in Eaton, west Cheshire
- Listed buildings in Eccleston, Cheshire
- Listed buildings in Edge, Cheshire
- Listed buildings in Edleston
- Listed buildings in Ellesmere Port
- Listed buildings in Elton, Cheshire
- Listed buildings in Faddiley
- Listed buildings in Farndon, Cheshire
- Listed buildings in Foulk Stapleford
- Listed buildings in Frodsham
- Listed buildings in Gawsworth
- Listed buildings in Golborne Bellow
- Listed buildings in Golborne David
- Listed buildings in Goostrey
- Listed buildings in Grappenhall and Thelwall
- Listed buildings in Great Boughton
- Listed buildings in Great Budworth
- Listed buildings in Great Sankey
- Listed buildings in Great Sutton
- Listed buildings in Great Warford
- Listed buildings in Guilden Sutton
- Listed buildings in Hale, Halton
- Listed buildings in Hampton, Cheshire
- Listed buildings in Handley, Cheshire
- Listed buildings in Hankelow
- Listed buildings in Hapsford
- Listed buildings in Hartford, Cheshire
- Listed buildings in Harthill, Cheshire
- Listed buildings in Haslington
- Listed buildings in Hassall
- Listed buildings in Hatherton, Cheshire
- Listed buildings in Hatton, Warrington
- Listed buildings in Haughton, Cheshire
- Listed buildings in Helsby
- Listed buildings in Henbury, Cheshire
- Listed buildings in Henhull
- Listed buildings in High Legh
- Listed buildings in Higher Hurdsfield
- Listed buildings in Holmes Chapel
- Listed buildings in Hoole Village
- Listed buildings in Hooton, Cheshire
- Listed buildings in Horton-cum-Peel
- Listed buildings in Hough, Cheshire
- Listed buildings in Hulme Walfield
- Listed buildings in Hunsterson
- Listed buildings in Huntington, Cheshire
- Listed buildings in Hurleston
- Listed buildings in Huxley, Cheshire
- Listed buildings in Ince
- Listed buildings in Kelsall
- Listed buildings in Kettleshulme
- Listed buildings in Kingsley, Cheshire
- Listed buildings in Knutsford
- Listed buildings in Lach Dennis
- Listed buildings in Lea Newbold
- Listed buildings in Ledsham, Cheshire
- Listed buildings in Little Bollington
- Listed buildings in Little Budworth
- Listed buildings in Little Leigh
- Listed buildings in Lostock Gralam
- Listed buildings in Lower Kinnerton
- Listed buildings in Lower Withington
- Listed buildings in Lyme Handley
- Listed buildings in Lymm
- Listed buildings in Macclesfield
- Listed buildings in Macclesfield Forest and Wildboarclough
- Listed buildings of Malpas, Cheshire
- Listed buildings in Manley, Cheshire
- Listed buildings in Marbury cum Quoisley
- Listed buildings in Marlston-cum-Lache
- Listed buildings in Marston, Cheshire
- Listed buildings in Marthall
- Listed buildings in Marton, Cheshire
- Listed buildings in Mere, Cheshire
- Listed buildings in Mickle Trafford
- Listed buildings in Middlewich
- Listed buildings in Millington, Cheshire
- Listed buildings in Minshull Vernon
- Listed buildings in Mobberley
- Listed buildings in Mollington, Cheshire
- Listed buildings in Moreton cum Alcumlow
- Listed buildings in Moston, Cheshire East
- Listed buildings in Mottram St Andrew
- Listed buildings in Mouldsworth
- Listed buildings in Moulton, Cheshire
- Listed buildings in Nantwich
- Listed buildings in Neston
- Listed buildings in Nether Alderley
- Listed buildings in Nether Peover
- Listed buildings in Newbold Astbury
- Listed buildings in Newhall, Cheshire
- Listed buildings in Newton-by-Tattenhall
- Listed buildings in Norbury, Cheshire
- Listed buildings in Norley
- Listed buildings in North Rode
- Listed buildings in Northwich
- Listed buildings in Oakmere
- Listed buildings in Odd Rode
- Listed buildings in Ollerton, Cheshire
- Listed buildings in Over Alderley
- Listed buildings in Overton, Malpas
- Listed buildings in Peckforton
- Listed buildings in Penketh
- Listed buildings in Peover Inferior
- Listed buildings in Peover Superior
- Listed buildings in Pickmere
- Listed buildings in Plumley
- Listed buildings in Poole, Cheshire
- Listed buildings in Pott Shrigley
- Listed buildings in Poulton, Cheshire
- Listed buildings in Poulton-with-Fearnhead
- Listed buildings in Poynton with Worth
- Listed buildings in Prestbury, Cheshire
- Listed buildings in Puddington, Cheshire
- Listed buildings in Pulford
- Listed buildings in Rainow
- Listed buildings in Ridley, Cheshire
- Listed buildings in Rixton-with-Glazebrook
- Listed buildings in Rostherne
- Listed buildings in Rowton, Cheshire
- Listed buildings in Rudheath
- Listed buildings in Runcorn (urban area)
- Listed buildings in Runcorn (rural area)
- Listed buildings in Rushton, Cheshire
- Listed buildings in Saighton
- Listed buildings in Sandbach
- Listed buildings in Saughall
- Listed buildings in Shavington cum Gresty
- Listed buildings in Shocklach Oviatt
- Listed buildings in Shotwick
- Listed buildings in Shotwick Park
- Listed buildings in Siddington, Cheshire
- Listed buildings in Smallwood, Cheshire
- Listed buildings in Snelson, Cheshire
- Listed buildings in Somerford Booths
- Listed buildings in Sound, Cheshire
- Listed buildings in Sproston
- Listed buildings in Spurstow
- Listed buildings in Stanthorne
- Listed buildings in Stapeley
- Listed buildings in Stoak
- Listed buildings in Stockton Heath
- Listed buildings in Stoke, Cheshire East
- Listed buildings in Stretton, Cheshire West and Chester
- Listed buildings in Stretton, Warrington
- Listed buildings in Sutton, Cheshire East
- Listed buildings in Sutton, Cheshire West and Chester
- Listed buildings in Swettenham
- Listed buildings in Tabley Inferior
- Listed buildings in Tabley Superior
- Listed buildings in Tarporley
- Listed buildings in Tarvin
- Listed buildings in Tattenhall
- Listed buildings in Tatton, Cheshire
- Listed buildings in Thornton-le-Moors
- Listed buildings in Threapwood
- Listed buildings in Tilston
- Listed buildings in Tilstone Fearnall
- Listed buildings in Tiverton, Cheshire
- Listed buildings in Toft, Cheshire
- Listed buildings in Tushingham cum Grindley
- Listed buildings in Twemlow
- Listed buildings in Upton-by-Chester
- Listed buildings in Utkinton
- Listed buildings in Walgherton
- Listed buildings in Walton, Cheshire
- Listed buildings in Wardle, Cheshire
- Listed buildings in Warmingham
- Listed buildings in Warrington (unparished area)
- Listed buildings in Waverton, Cheshire
- Listed buildings in Weaverham
- Listed buildings in Wervin
- Listed buildings in Weston, Cheshire East
- Listed buildings in Whitegate and Marton
- Listed buildings in Whitley, Cheshire
- Listed buildings in Widnes
- Listed buildings in Wigland
- Listed buildings in Willaston, Cheshire West
- Listed buildings in Willington, Cheshire
- Listed buildings in Wilmslow
- Listed buildings in Wimbolds Trafford
- Listed buildings in Wimboldsley
- Listed buildings in Wincham
- Listed buildings in Wincle
- Listed buildings in Winsford
- Listed buildings in Winwick, Cheshire
- Listed buildings in Wirswall
- Listed buildings in Wistaston
- Listed buildings in Woolston, Cheshire
- Listed buildings in Worleston
- Listed buildings in Wrenbury cum Frith
- Listed buildings in Wybunbury
- Listed buildings in Wychough
