= Vale Royal =

Former borough in Cheshire, England

Coordinates: 53°15′N 2°36′W

Borough of Vale Royal
- Shown within Cheshire
- History
  - Origin: Northwich Urban District; Winsford Urban District; Northwich Rural District; Runcorn Rural District (part of)
  - Created: 1 April 1974
  - Abolished: 31 March 2009
  - Succeeded by: Cheshire West and Chester
- Status: Non-metropolitan district
- ONS code: 13UH
  - HQ: Winsford

Vale Royal was, from 1974 to 2009, a local government district with borough status in Cheshire, England. It contained the towns of Northwich, Winsford and Frodsham.

== History ==
The district was created on 1 April 1974 under the Local Government Act 1972 covering the area of three former districts and part of a fourth, which were abolished at the same time:

- Northwich Rural District
- Northwich Urban District
- Runcorn Rural District (part)
- Winsford Urban District

The district took its name from Vale Royal Abbey, formerly one of the largest in England, which was situated near the village of Whitegate near the centre of the district. The name was suggested in 1972 by a joint committee of the previous district councils, on the basis of the historic use of the name for the general area of the new district. The district was granted borough status on 5 May 1988, allowing the chairman of the council to take the title of mayor.

In 2006 the Department for Communities and Local Government considered reorganising Cheshire's administrative structure as part of the 2009 structural changes to local government in England. The decision to merge Vale Royal with the districts of Chester and Ellesmere Port and Neston to create a single unitary authority was announced on 25 July 2007, following a consultation period in which a proposal to create a single Cheshire unitary authority was rejected.

Vale Royal was abolished on 31 March 2009, with the area becoming part of the new unitary authority of Cheshire West and Chester from 1 April 2009.

== Civil parishes ==
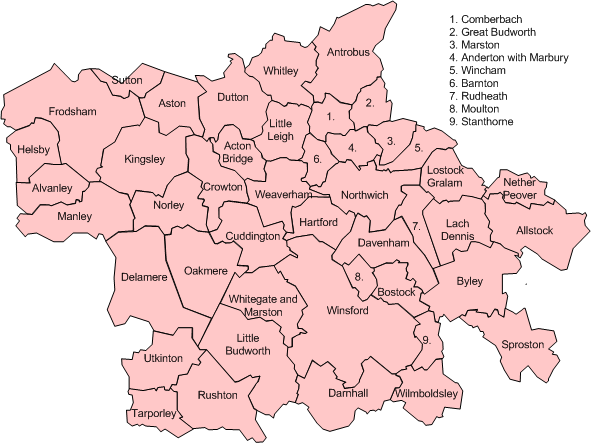
Civil parishes within Vale Royal (2009).

The district comprised the following civil parishes:

- Acton Bridge
- Allostock
- Alvanley
- Anderton with Marbury
- Antrobus
- Aston
- Barnton
- Bostock
- Byley
- Comberbach
- Crowton
- Cuddington
- Darnhall
- Davenham
- Delamere
- Dutton
- Frodsham
- Great Budworth
- Hartford
- Helsby
- Kingsley
- Lach Dennis
- Little Budworth
- Little Leigh
- Lostock Gralam
- Lower Peover
- Manley
- Marston
- Moulton
- Norley
- Northwich
- Oakmere
- Rudheath
- Rushton
- Sproston
- Stanthorne
- Sutton
- Tarporley
- Utkinton
- Weaverham
- Whitegate and Marton
- Whitley
- Wimboldsley
- Wincham
- Winsford

== Political control ==
The first elections to the council were held in 1973, initially operating as a shadow authority until the new arrangements came into effect on 1 April 1974. Political control of the council from 1974 until its abolition in 2009 was as follows:

Party in control	Years
No overall control	1974–1991
Labour	1991–2003
No overall control	2003–2007
Conservative	2007–2008
No overall control	2008–2009

=== Leadership ===
The leaders of the council from 1988 were:

Councillor	Party	From	To
Marie Birkenhead	Conservative		5 May 1988
Arthur Neil	Labour	5 May 1988	11 May 1989
David Broster	Conservative	11 May 1989	10 May 1990
Bernard Burton	Conservative	10 May 1990	1991
Arthur Neil	Labour	1991	Apr 2000
Bob Mather	Labour	Apr 2000	May 2003
Keith Musgrave	Conservative	May 2003	May 2007
Les Ford	Conservative	May 2007	31 Mar 2009

=== Composition ===
The political composition of the council at its abolition in 2009 was:

Party	Councillors
Conservative	26
Labour	17
Liberal Democrat	11
Weaverham Independents	3

== Premises ==
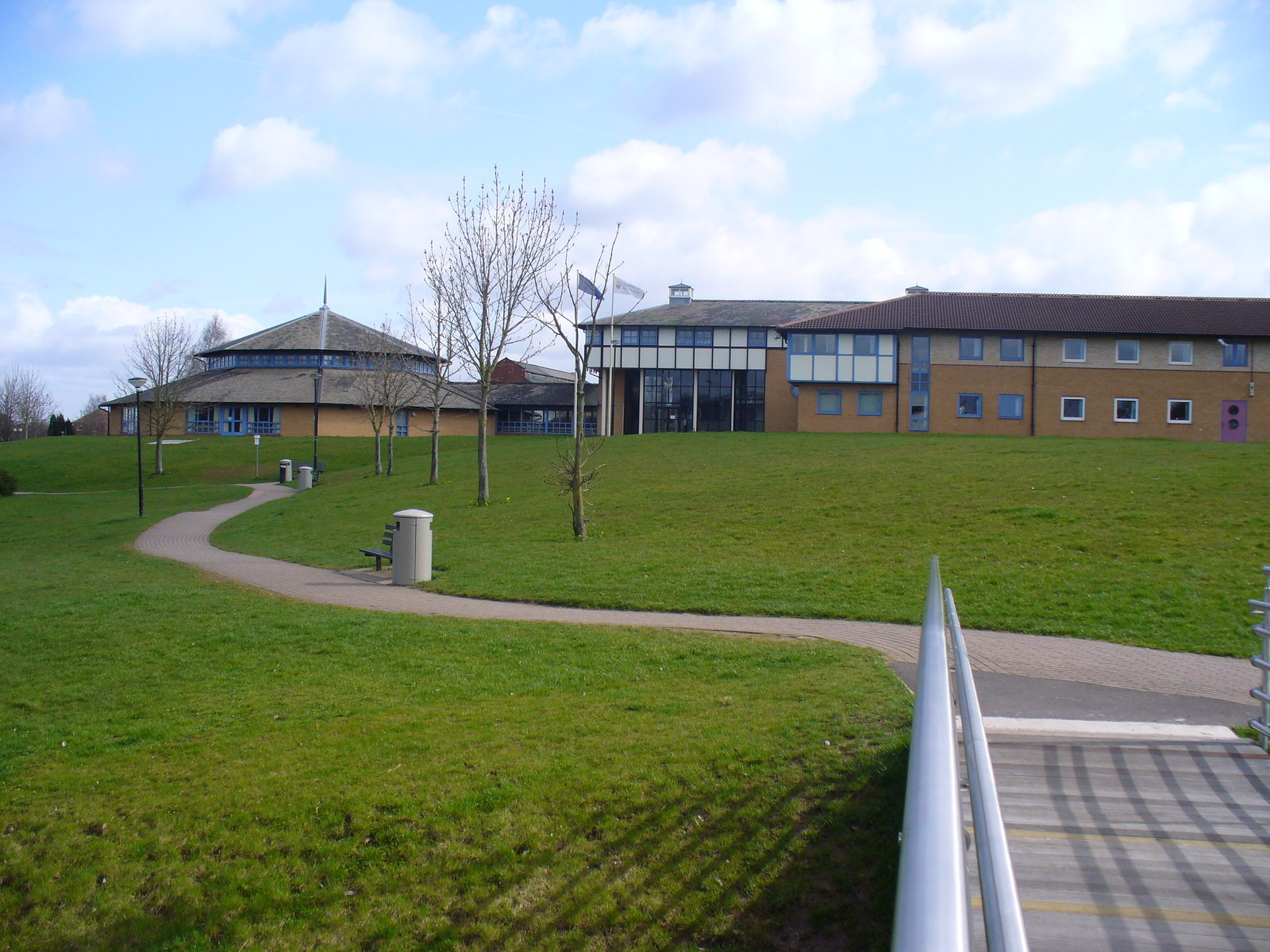
Wyvern House, The Drumber, Winsford: Council headquarters 1990–2009

Until 1990 the council operated from the various offices it had inherited from its predecessors, being Whitehall in Hartford (from Northwich Rural District Council), the Council House in Northwich (from Northwich Urban District Council), Castle Park House in Frodsham (from Runcorn Rural District Council), and Over Hall in Winsford (from Winsford Urban District Council). In 1990 the council consolidated its offices into a new purpose-built headquarters called Wyvern House on The Drumber in Winsford. Wyvern House was formally opened by Princess Margaret on 19 July 1991. Since the council's abolition in 2009, Wyvern House has been used as one of the offices of its successor, Cheshire West and Chester Council.

== Council elections ==
- 1973 Vale Royal District Council election
- 1976 Vale Royal District Council election (New ward boundaries)
- 1979 Vale Royal District Council election
- 1983 Vale Royal District Council election (District boundary changes took place but the number of seats remained the same)
- 1987 Vale Royal District Council election
- 1991 Vale Royal Borough Council election (Borough boundary changes took place but the number of seats remained the same)
- 1995 Vale Royal Borough Council election
- 1999 Vale Royal Borough Council election (New ward boundaries)
- 2003 Vale Royal Borough Council election
- 2007 Vale Royal Borough Council election

=== Results maps ===
2003 results map

2007 results map

=== By-election results ===
Castle By-Election 25 July 1996
Party	Candidate	Votes	%	±%
Labour		535	61.9	
Conservative		201	23.3	
Liberal Democrats		128	14.8	
Majority		334	38.6	
Turnout		864	18.0	
Labour hold		Swing		

Vale Royal By-Election 24 October 1996
Party	Candidate	Votes	%	±%
Labour		637	61.9	
Liberal Democrats		218	21.2	
Conservative		174	16.9	
Majority		419	40.7	
Turnout		1,029	21.0	
Labour hold		Swing		

Davenham and Moulton By-Election 10 April 1997
Party	Candidate	Votes	%	±%
Liberal Democrats		695	42.3	
Labour		486	29.6	
Conservative		461	28.1	
Majority		209	12.7	
Turnout		1,642	33.6	
Liberal Democrats gain from Labour		Swing		

Tarporley By-Election 10 April 1997
Party	Candidate	Votes	%	±%
Conservative		372	58.3	
Labour		138	21.6	
Liberal Democrats		128	20.1	
Majority		234	36.7	
Turnout		638	30.7	
Conservative hold		Swing		

Northwich Witton By-Election 7 June 2001
Party	Candidate	Votes	%	±%
Labour		1,413	60.5	
Conservative		456	19.5	
Liberal Democrats		320	13.7	
Independent		146	6.3	
Majority		957	41.0	
Turnout		2,335		
Labour hold		Swing		

Kingsley By-Election 25 September 2003
Party	Candidate	Votes	%	±%
Conservative		364	53.2	+14.3
Liberal Democrats		187	27.3	−29.3
Labour		133	19.4	+14.9
Majority		177	25.9	
Turnout		684	40.7	
Conservative gain from Liberal Democrats		Swing		

Frodsham South By-Election 4 March 2004
Party	Candidate	Votes	%	±%
Conservative		263	47.9	−0.6
Liberal Democrats		166	30.2	−1.5
Labour		120	21.9	+2.1
Majority		97	17.7	
Turnout		549	31.3	
Conservative hold		Swing		

Lostock and Wincham By-Election 26 August 2004
Party	Candidate	Votes	%	±%
Conservative		414	46.1	+21.3
Liberal Democrats		274	30.5	−17.8
Labour		185	20.6	−6.3
Independent		26	2.9	+2.9
Majority		140	15.6	
Turnout		899	26.9	
Conservative gain from Liberal Democrats		Swing		

Winsford Swanlow By-Election 20 January 2005
Party	Candidate	Votes	%	±%
Liberal Democrats	Brandon Parkey	326	48.9	−20.3
Conservative		183	27.5	+13.4
Labour		157	23.6	+6.9
Majority		143	21.4	
Turnout		666	19.5	
Liberal Democrats hold		Swing		

Winsford Verdin By-Election 20 January 2005
Party	Candidate	Votes	%	±%
Liberal Democrats	Peter Gannon	336	56.4	+18.7
Labour		188	31.5	−8.6
Conservative		72	12.1	−12.1
Majority		148	24.9	
Turnout		596	12.0	
Liberal Democrats gain from Labour		Swing		

Leftwich and Kingsmead By-Election 9 February 2006
Party	Candidate	Votes	%	±%
Labour	Helen Burder	334	36.2	+3.4
Liberal Democrats	Glyn Roberts	296	32.1	+2.5
Conservative	Kathryn Birtwistle	293	31.7	−5.9
Majority		38	4.1	
Turnout		923	16.0	
Labour hold		Swing		

Leftwich and Kingsmead By-Election 1 May 2008
Party	Candidate	Votes	%	±%
Conservative	Helen Weltman	855	54.8	+24.5
Labour	Paul Dolan	383	24.5	−3.4
Liberal Democrats	Glyn Roberts	323	20.7	+3.4
Majority		472	30.2	
Turnout		1,561		
Conservative hold		Swing		
