= Peover =

Rural area in Cheshire, England

Coordinates: 53.263°N 2.363°W

Peover (/ˈpiːvər/ PEE-vər) is a rural area in Cheshire, England straddling the boundary of Cheshire West and Cheshire East. It is southwest of Chelford and northwest of Jodrell Bank. Peover is mentioned in the Domesday Book as "Pevre", from a Celtic word meaning "the bright one" referring to the Peover Eye.

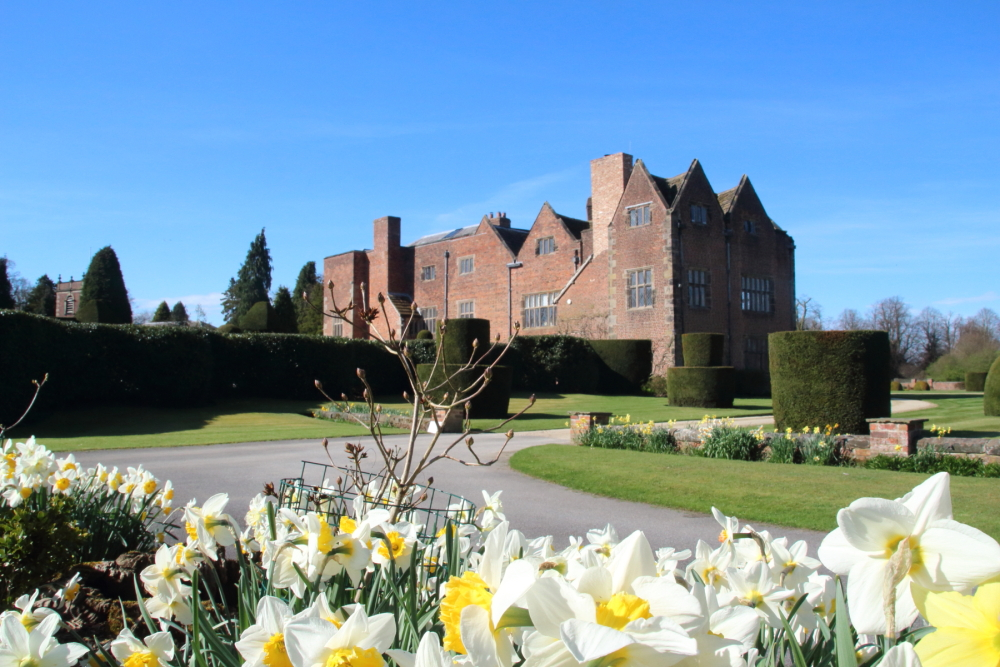
Peover Hall

It contains the civil parishes of Peover Superior (also called Over Peover), Peover Inferior (also called Lower Peover) and Nether Peover, as well as the hamlet of Peover Heath. Peover Hall in Peover Superior is a Grade II* listed country house.

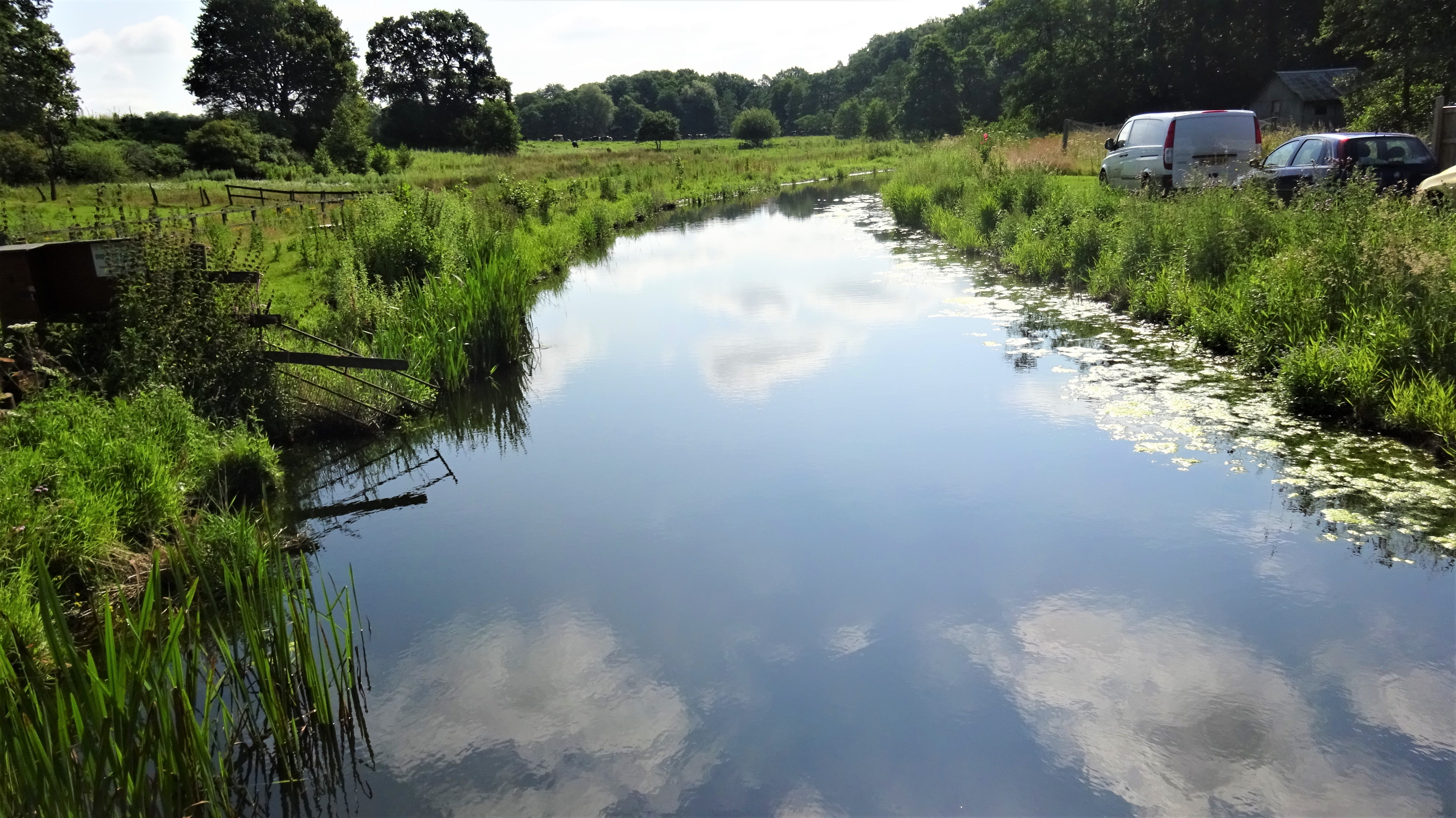
Peover Eye at Bate Mill, Peover Superior

The area is largely flat but has narrow incised gullies along streams. The brook called Peover Eye, which is formed from several springs and field drainage in the Peover area, runs north-northwest into the Wincham Brook a short distance northeast of Lostock Gralam.

== See also ==
- Peover Superior
  - Peover Hall
- Peover Inferior
- Nether Peover
