= Lostock Gralam =

Village and civil parish in Cheshire, England

Coordinates: 53.2667°N 2.4667°W

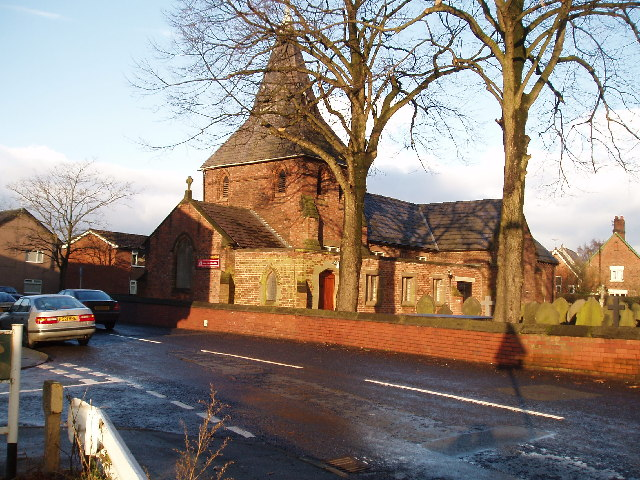
- Church of St John the Evangelist

- Location within Cheshire
- Population: 2,298 (2011)
- OS grid reference: SJ6975
- Civil parish: Lostock Gralam
- Unitary authority: Cheshire West and Chester
- Ceremonial county: Cheshire
- Region: North West
- Country: England
- Sovereign state: United Kingdom
- Post town: NORTHWICH
- Postcode district: CW9
- Dialling code: 01606
- Police: Cheshire
- Fire: Cheshire
- Ambulance: North West
- UK Parliament: Tatton

Lostock Gralam (/ɡreɪləm/ GRAY-ləm) is a village and civil parish in Cheshire West and Chester, Cheshire, England; it is sited east of Northwich. The civil parish also includes the small hamlet of Lostock Green. At the 2011 census, the population was 2,298.

== Geography ==
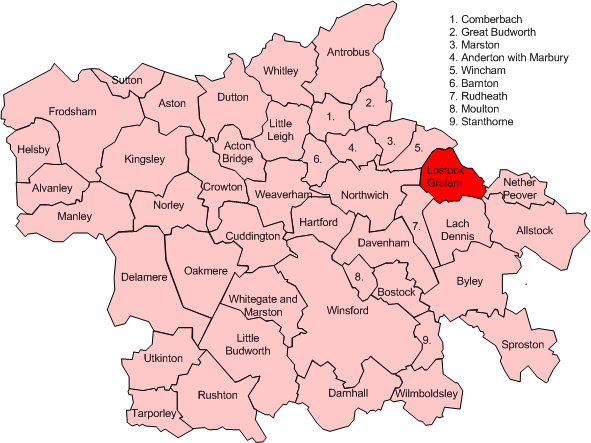
Map of civil parish of Lostock Gralam within the former borough of Vale Royal

Lostock Gralam lies in the centre of the Cheshire Plain. It borders the parishes of Northwich, Wincham, Rudheath, Lower Peover, Allostock and Plumley.

== Transport ==
The main street, Manchester Road, is on the route of a Roman road, sometimes known as Watling Street; it connects Manchester with Chester, via Northwich, that subsequently became a turnpike road. Most through traffic is now diverted on the A556 Northwich bypass, which divides the original village between Lostock Gralam north of the bypass and Lostock Green to the south.

Lostock Gralam railway station is a stop on the Mid-Cheshire line between Chester, Altrincham, Stockport and Manchester Piccadilly. Northern Trains operates generally hourly services in each direction.

The Trent and Mersey Canal runs through the parish. There is a wharf at Wincham where the canal passes under the Manchester Road.

== Schools ==
Lostock Gralam Church of England Primary School was formed in 1984 after Lostock Gralam Junior School and Manchester Road Infant School were amalgamated. The school is next to St John the Evangelist Church in School Lane. About 140 pupils attend the school.

There is also a charity run nursery school, called Lostock Tiny Tots, with close links to the primary school and the church, in the vicarage on Station Road.

== Amenities ==
There are three pubs: the Slow and Easy, The Lambs Wharf, both on the main Manchester Road through the village, and the Weaver's Whistle (formerly The Watermead), off Cheshire Avenue to the east.

The community centre on Stubbs Lane hosts various activities.

Development work is currently under way on the triangle site adjacent to the A556. The project was initially for the whole area to become the Cheshire Business Park, but only the first phase of office units was constructed; it remains largely unoccupied. The site includes the Weaver's Whistle pub and the Northwich Lostock Gralam Travelodge hotel. An outline planning application for housing on the remainder of the site was granted consent in January 2011.

== Sport ==
Lostock also hosts one of Cheshire's oldest football clubs, Lostock Gralam F.C., having played continuously at their home on Manchester Road since 1892. Lostock are one of Cheshire's leading amateur clubs, despite being based in a relatively small area.

Mike Whitlow, a former footballer, grew up in the village; he won the Football League First Division championship with Leeds United, as well as playing for Leicester City and Bolton Wanderers in the Premier League.

== Population ==
- 1801: 361
- 1851: 519
- 1901: 1,640
- 1951: 1,522
- 2011: 2,298

== See also ==
- Listed buildings in Lostock Gralam
