= Listed buildings in Lach Dennis =

Lach Dennis is a civil parish in Cheshire West and Chester, England. It contains six buildings that are recorded in the National Heritage List for England as designated listed buildings, all of which are at Grade II. This grade is the lowest of the three gradings given to listed buildings and is applied to "buildings of national importance and special interest". Other than the village of Lach Dennis, the parish is entirely rural, the listed buildings all being domestic or related to agriculture. Five of the six buildings originated in the 17th century.

| Name and location | Photograph | Date | Notes |
|---|---|---|---|
| Marsh Farmhouse; 53.2392°N 2.4502°W | — | 17th century | Originally a timber-framed farmhouse, it was later encased in brick. An extension was added to the rear in the 18th century. It has a slate roof, is in two storeys. and has an L-shaped plan. The front is in four bays. In 2008 it was substantially damaged in a fire. |
| Newhall Farmhouse; 53.2438°N 2.4371°W | — | Mid-17th century | The farmhouse was altered in the 18th century, and again later. It is constructed in brick with stone dressings, and has a slate roof. The house is in two storeys, has a front of four bays, and is an L-plan. The door is flanked by Tuscan columns and pilasters, above which is an ogee-shaped cornice. The windows are sashes. |
| 1 and 2 Hulse Lane; 53.2523°N 2.4342°W | — | Mid-17th century | A pair of cottages in brick and timber framing with brick nogging, and with a slate roof. The roof has been raised by brickwork. The cottages are in a single storey with an attic, and have two bays. The windows are casements. |
| Yew Tree Farmhouse; 53.2447°N 2.4439°W | — | Late 17th century | Constructed in brick with a slate roof, the farmhouse is in two storeys with an attic and basement. It is in three bays, and has an F-shaped plan. Above the door is a hood with bargeboards and a finial. The house has sash windows, which are mainly in pairs with mullions. |
| Barn, Yew Tree Farm; 53.2447°N 2.4435°W | — | Late 17th century | The barn is constructed in brick, and timber framing with brick nogging. It has an asbestos-cement roof. The barn is in three bays, and has 20th-century doors and windows. |
| Hulse Heath Farmhouse; 53.2531°N 2.4363°W | — | Early 19th century | The farmhouse is in brick with a slate roof. It is in two storeys with an attic and a basement, and has three bays. The doorcase has pilasters and a fanlight. The windows are sashes. |

== See also ==
- Listed buildings in Allostock
- Listed buildings in Byley
- Listed buildings in Davenham
- Listed buildings in Lostock Gralam
- Listed buildings in Nether Peover
- Listed buildings in Northwich
- Listed buildings in Plumley
- Listed buildings in Rudheath
