= Holford Hall =

Country house in Cheshire, England

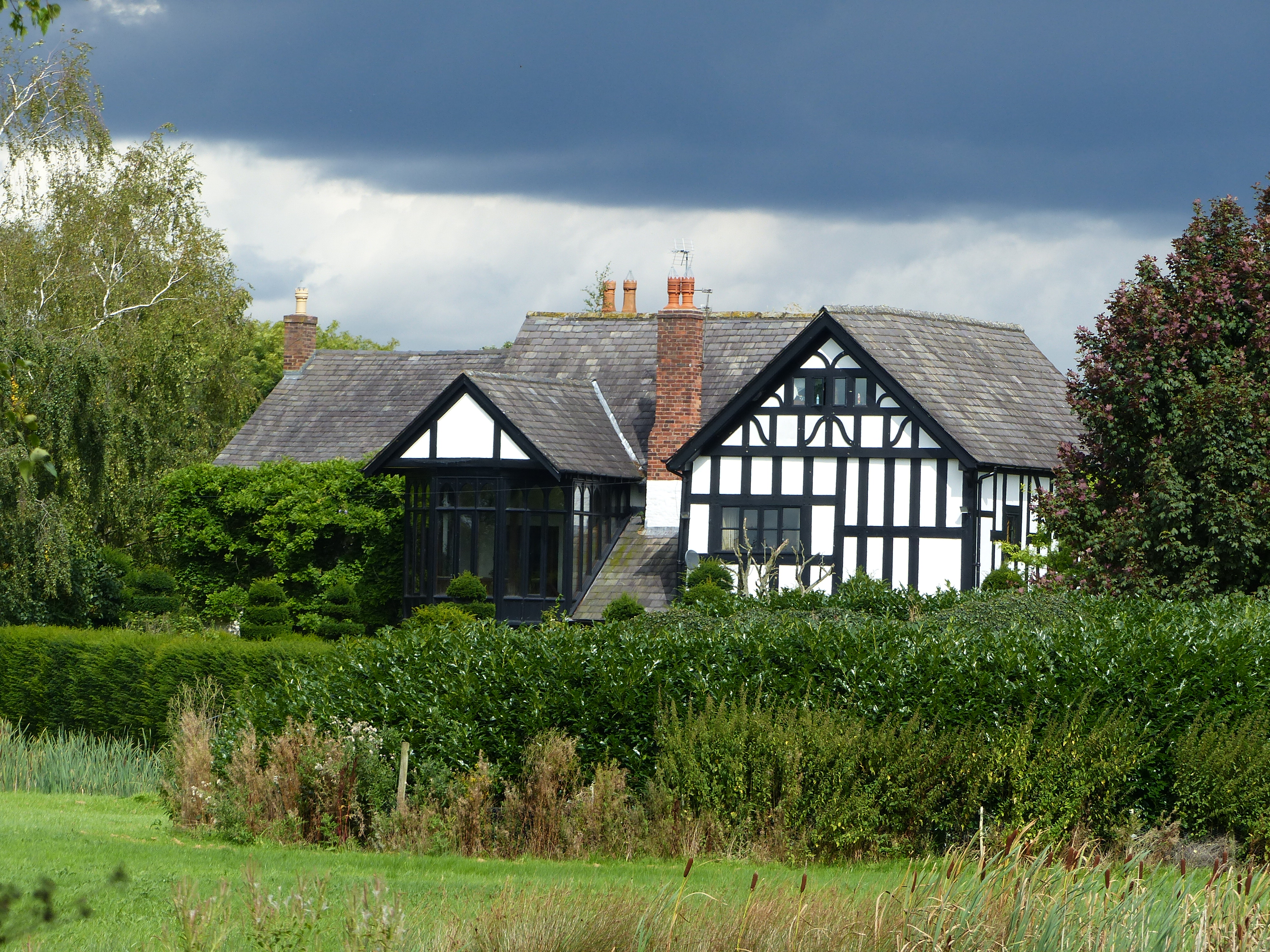
- Holford Hall from the west

- Location in Cheshire
- 53.27516°N 2.43791°W
- Location: Plumley, Cheshire, England

Listed Building – Grade II*
- Official name: Holford Hall
- Designated: 5 March 1959
- Reference no.: 1329664

Holford Hall is a country house west of the village of Plumley, Cheshire, England. It consists of a fragment of a much larger timber-framed house, built in 1601 for Mary Cholmondeley on a moated site. Part of the building was demolished in the 1880s. The house is timber-framed with rendered infill. It has a stone-slate roof. The entrance front has two bays with gables and Ionic pilasters. The architectural historian Nikolaus Pevsner describes this front as being "highly decorated". The house is recorded in the National Heritage List for England as a designated Grade II* listed building. The stone bridge leading to the house across the moat is listed at Grade II, and the moated site on which the house stands is a scheduled monument.

Holford Hall was purchased privately in 1988 and the hall and its estate has been renovated. In 2014 the working horse barn was transformed into a special events venue, and the Holford Mill was reconnected. Today the Holford Estate's formal gardens, event barn and mill operate as a wedding venue.

== See also ==
- Grade II* listed buildings in Cheshire East
- Listed buildings in Plumley
