= Northwich Rural District =

Former local government area in the UK

Coordinates: 53.230°N 2.498°W

Northwich RD within Cheshire in 1970

Northwich Rural District was a rural district surrounding, but not including the towns of Northwich and Winsford in Cheshire, which were separate urban districts. It was created in 1894 from the Northwich Rural Sanitary District.

In 1936, several changes were made to the boundaries of the rural district; the most significant was enlargement due to the abolition of Tarporley Urban District. Before the 1936 changes, the district also surrounded the town of Middlewich. In 1974, the district was abolished and the area along with Northwich Urban District, Winsford Urban District and parts of Runcorn Rural District became the district (later Borough) of Vale Royal.

The council was based in Hartford (west of Northwich) which became the headquarters of Vale Royal District Council. The former headquarters site has now been sold and a housing estate built in the grounds.

== Parishes ==
The district included the parishes of:

- Acton (renamed Acton Bridge in 1967)
- Allostock
- Anderton
- Barnton
- Bostock
- Byley
- Clive (abolished to enlarge Stanthorne and Winsford Urban District in 1936)
- Cogshall (abolished to enlarge Comberbach in 1936)
- Comerbach
- Crowton
- Croxton (abolished to enlarge Byley in 1936)
- Cuddington
- Darnhall
- Davenham
- Delamere
- Eaton (abolished to enlarge Davenham 1936)
- Eddisbury (abolished to enlarge Delamere in 1936)
- Hartford
- Kinderton (abolished to enlarge Bradwell, Byley, Sproston, Stanthorne, Tetton, Wimboldsley and Middlewich Urban District in 1936)
- Lach Dennis
- Leftwich (abolished to enlarge Davenham, Hartford and Northwich Urban District in 1936)
- Little Budworth
- Little Leigh
- Lostock Gralam
- Marbury
- Marston
- Marton
- Moulton
- Nether Peover
- Oakmere
- Rudheath
- Rushton (part of Tarporley Rural District until 1936)
- Sproston
- Stanthorne (abolished and transferred to Winsford Urban District in 1936)
- Tarporley (part of Tarporley Urban District until 1936)
- Utkinton (part of Tarporley Urban District until 1936)
- Weaverham Cum Milton
- Whatcroft
- Wimboldsley
- Wincham
- Winnington (abolished to enlarge Hartford, Weaverham cum Milton and Northwich Urban District in 1936)
