= Listed buildings in Lostock Gralam =

Lostock Gralam is a civil parish in Cheshire West and Chester, England. Other than the villages of Lostock Gralam and Lostock Green, the parish is entirely rural. It contains three buildings that are recorded in the National Heritage List for England as designated listed buildings, all of which are at Grade II. This is the lowest of the three grades, which contains "buildings of national importance and special interest". All three listed buildings are related to farming.

== Buildings ==
Name and location	Photograph	Date	Notes
Park Farmhouse; 53.2575°N 2.4566°W	—	Late 17th century (probable)	A brick building with slate roofs. It is in three storeys, with four casement windows in each storey. In the centre is a 2 1/2-storey gabled porch.
Cape of Good Hope Farmhouse; 53.2570°N 2.4299°W	—	Early 18th century (probable)	The farmhouse is constructed in rendered brick, with stone-dressed gables and a slate roof.
Shippon and barn, Park Farm; 53.2577°N 2.4567°W	—	18th century (probable)	These form an L-shaped building. It is in brick with a slate roof. Features include the opening to a former threshing floor, and diamond-shaped vents.

== See also ==
- Listed buildings in Northwich
- Listed buildings in Plumley
- Listed buildings in Rudheath
- Listed buildings in Wincham
