= Listed buildings in Pickmere =

Pickmere is a civil parish in Cheshire East, England. It contains two buildings that are recorded in the National Heritage List for England as designated listed buildings, both of which are at Grade II. This grade is the lowest of the three gradings given to listed buildings and is applied to "buildings of national importance and special interest". Both the listed buildings originated as farmhouses.

Name and location	Photograph	Date	Notes
Pickmere Farm; 53.29022°N 2.46562°W		1772	The former farmhouse is built in brick with stone dressings and a slate roof. It is in three storeys, and has a symmetrical entrance front of three bays. The central bay projects slightly forward and contains a door with a fanlight, and a datestone in the gable. The windows are casements.
Mereview Farm; 53.29155°N 2.46982°W		1773	The farmhouse is built in brick with stone dressings. It is in two storeys, and has a symmetrical entrance front of three bays. There is a central doorway with a fanlight, and the windows are casements. Above the doorway and the windows are stone lintels carved to give the appearance of rusticated voussoirs and dropped keystones.

== See also ==
- Listed buildings in Tabley Superior
- Listed buildings in Tabley Inferior
- Listed buildings in Plumley
- Listed buildings in Wincham
- Listed buildings in Marston
- Listed buildings in Great Budworth
