= Caughall =

Former civil parish in Cheshire, England

Coordinates: 53.227°N 2.885°W

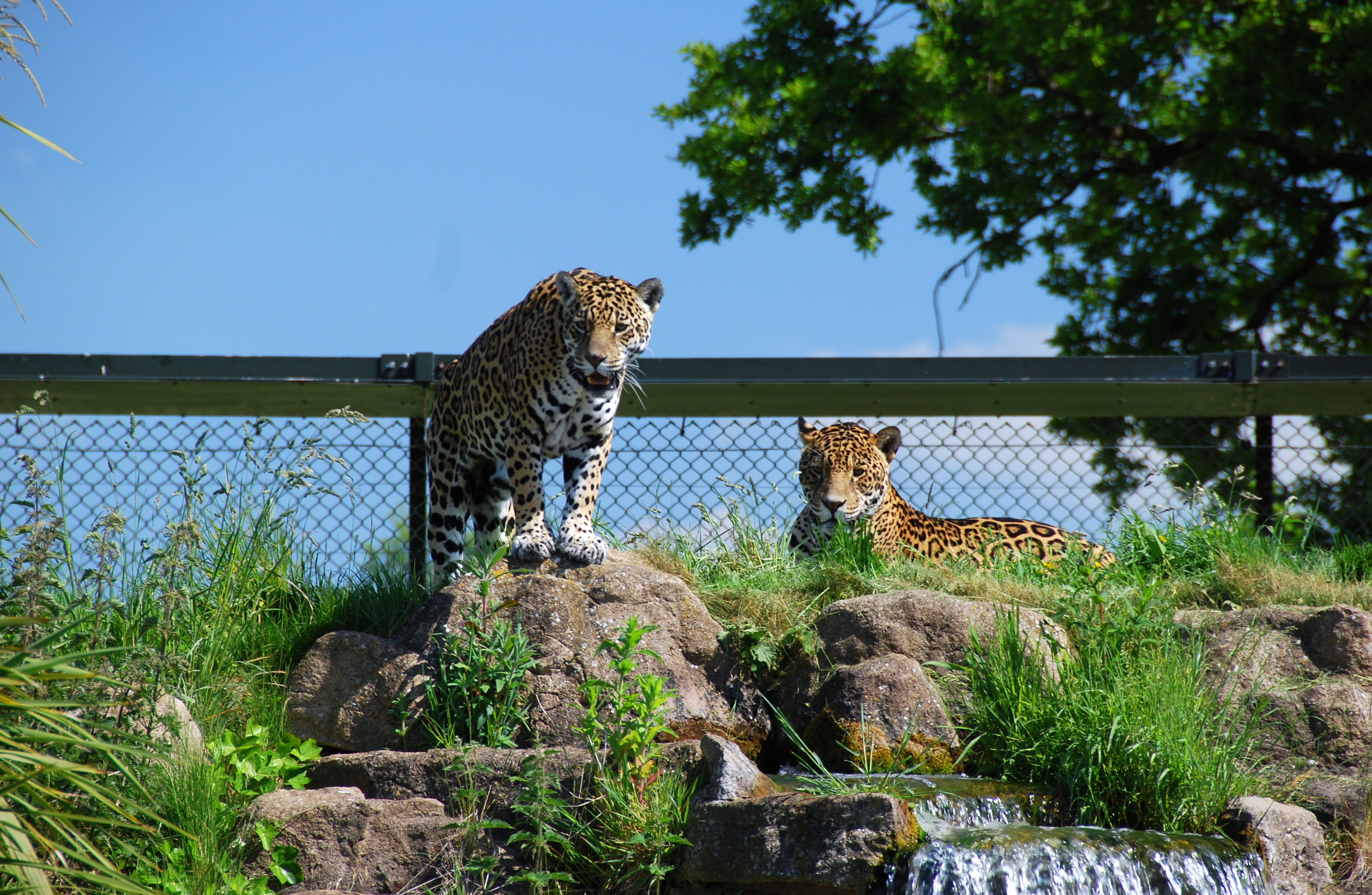
- Jaguars at Chester Zoo

- Location within Cheshire
- Population: 29 (2001)
- OS grid reference: SJ4170
- Civil parish: Backford
- Unitary authority: Cheshire West and Chester
- Ceremonial county: Cheshire
- Region: North West
- Country: England
- Sovereign state: United Kingdom
- Post town: CHESTER
- Postcode district: CH2
- Dialling code: 01244
- Police: Cheshire
- Fire: Cheshire
- Ambulance: North West
- UK Parliament: City of Chester

Caughall is a former civil parish, now in the parish of Backford, in the borough of Cheshire West and Chester and ceremonial county of Cheshire in England. In 2001 it had a population of 29. The parish included Caughall Manor and Chester Zoo. Caughall was formerly a township in the parish of Backford, in 1866 Caughall became a separate civil parish, on 1 April 2015 the parish was abolished and merged with Backford.

== See also ==
- Listed buildings in Caughall
