= Newton-by-Tattenhall =

Former civil parish in Cheshire, England

Coordinates: 53.133°N 2.753°W

Newton
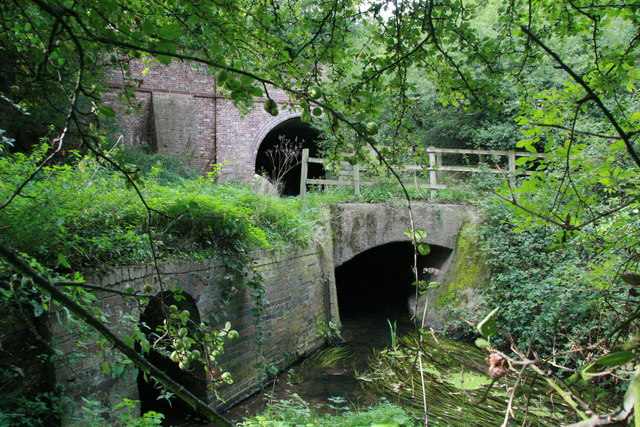
- River Gowy

- Location within Cheshire
- Population: 131 (2011)
- OS grid reference: SJ497598
- Civil parish: Tattenhall and District
- Unitary authority: Cheshire West and Chester
- Ceremonial county: Cheshire
- Region: North West
- Country: England
- Sovereign state: United Kingdom
- Post town: CHESTER
- Postcode district: CH3
- Dialling code: 01829
- Police: Cheshire
- Fire: Cheshire
- Ambulance: North West
- UK Parliament: Chester South and Eddisbury

Newton is a settlement and as Newton-by-Tattenhall a former civil parish, now in the parish of Tattenhall and District in the Cheshire West and Chester district, and ceremonial county of Cheshire in England. In 2011 it had a population of 131, up from 116 in 2001. Newton-by-Tattenhall was formerly a township in the parish of Tattenhall, in 1866 Newton by Tattenhall became a separate civil parish, on 1 April 2015 the parish was abolished to form Tattenhall and District, part also went to Hargrave and Huxley.

== See also ==
- Listed buildings in Newton-by-Tattenhall
