= Rudheath Senior Academy =

Location
- Middlewich Road; Rudheath; Northwich, Cheshire, CW9 7DT; England
- Coordinates: 53.25627°N 2.48363°W

Information
- Type: Academy
- Department for Education URN: 137582 Tables
- Ofsted: Reports
- Gender: Coeducational
- Age: 11 to 16
- Enrolment: 495
- Colours: Black and Red
- Website: rudheathsenioracademy.org.uk

Rudheath Senior Academy is a coeducational secondary school that educates approximately 420 children between 11 and 16 years of age. It is located in the village of Rudheath, near Northwich in Cheshire, England.

It was formerly known as Rudheath Community High School, and held specialist Arts College status. The school converted to academy status in January 2012 and was renamed University of Chester Academy Northwich. The school was then sponsored by the University of Chester Academies Trust.

The school was extensively damaged by an arson attack in February 2018 and has subsequently been substantially rebuilt. In November 2018 the school was transferred to the North West Academies Trust and was renamed Rudheath Senior Academy.
