= Listed buildings in Marston, Cheshire =

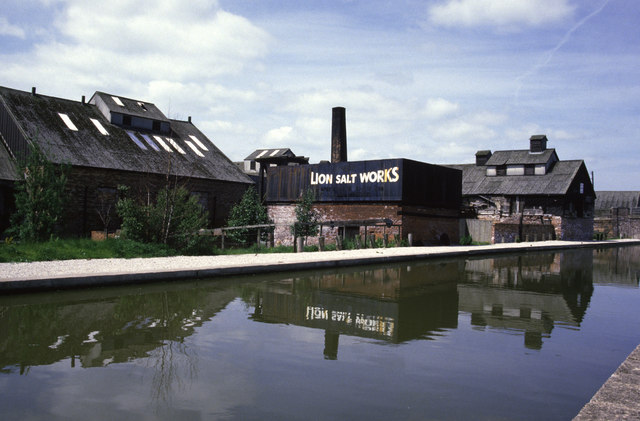
Lion Salt Works and the Trent and Mersey Canal

Marston is a village and a civil parish in Cheshire West and Chester, England. It contains nine buildings that are recorded in the National Heritage List for England as designated listed buildings, all of which are at Grade II. This grade is the lowest of the three gradings given to listed buildings and is applied to "buildings of national importance and special interest". Running through the parish is the Trent and Mersey Canal. The listed buildings consist of a milepost on the canal, a guidepost at a road junction, a farmhouse and farm building, a war memorial, and four structures associated with the Lion Salt Works. The latter is also a scheduled monument. It is "the only substantially intact example in the county of a works producing white crystal salt by the evaporation method", and houses "the only remaining natural brine pumping open pan salt works in Europe".

Name and location	Photograph	Date	Notes
Lane Ends House; 53.2865°N 2.4939°W	—	1695	This is a brick building with a slate roof in two storeys plus attics and cellar. Its plan consists of a main wing, a cross wing, and a two-storey porch in the angle between them. The windows are casements.
Farm building, Lane Ends House; 53.2865°N 2.4934°W	—	18th century (probable)	A L-shaped brick building in two storeys with a slate roof, which was originally a shippon, stable and barn. Features include doorways, casement windows, pitching eyes, and external stone steps.
Canal milepost 53.28136°N 2.50739°W		1814	A cast iron milepost consisting of a circular post carrying a curved plate inscribed with the distances to Preston Brook and Shardlow. The maker's name and the date are on a quatrefoil on the shaft.
Canal salt shed, Lion Salt Works; 53.2757°N 2.4953°W		Mid-19th century	A timber-framed weatherboarded building with a corrugated asbestos roof. At one end is a loading door, and at the other end is a door leading to the Trent and Mersey Canal. It was used for transferring salt from the works to canal boats. It was apparently demolished some time after 2018.
Office, Lion Salt Works; 53.27487°N 2.49498°W		Late 19th century	A timber-framed building with brick nogging and a slate roof. It is in a single storey, with a door and two casement windows. It has retained its internal Victorian office fittings. The office is designed so that it can be lifted in the event of subsidence due to salt extraction.
Pan sheds, Lion Salt Works; 53.2753°N 2.4951°W		Late 19th century	This is a U-shaped building, the legs of the U containing salt pans and stoves for the evaporation of salt, which are linked by a warehouse. It is constructed in weatherboarded timber framing and brick, with a corrugated asbestos roof.
Engine shed and pump house, Lion Salt Works; 53.27505°N 2.49497°W	—	c. 1900	A simple building in brick and timber, with a square brick chimney. It contains a steam engine to work a beam pump to raise brine.
War memorial 53.27863°N 2.49173°W		c. 1920	The war memorial in the cemetery is in sandstone, and consists of a Celtic cross. On the front of the cross is a carved sword, and it stands on a chamfered base with a heraldic shield and an inscription. Under this is a large tapered and chamfered plinth inscribed with the names of those lost in the two World Wars, and below this is a small inscribed plinth. The whole stands on a single-stepped base, and it is enclosed by eight bollards with chains.
Guidepost; 53.28590°N 2.49278°W		Early 20th century	The guidepost at a road junction is in cast iron, and consists of a hollow tapering shaft on a plinth. The top section is round, and has a cornice and four direction fingers, and it is surmounted by a finial in the form of a pawn chess piece.

== See also ==
- Listed buildings in Anderton with Marbury
- Listed buildings in Aston by Budworth
- Listed buildings in Great Budworth
- Listed buildings in Pickmere
- Listed buildings in Wincham
