= Hulme Hall, Allostock =

Country house in Cheshire, England

Hulme Hall
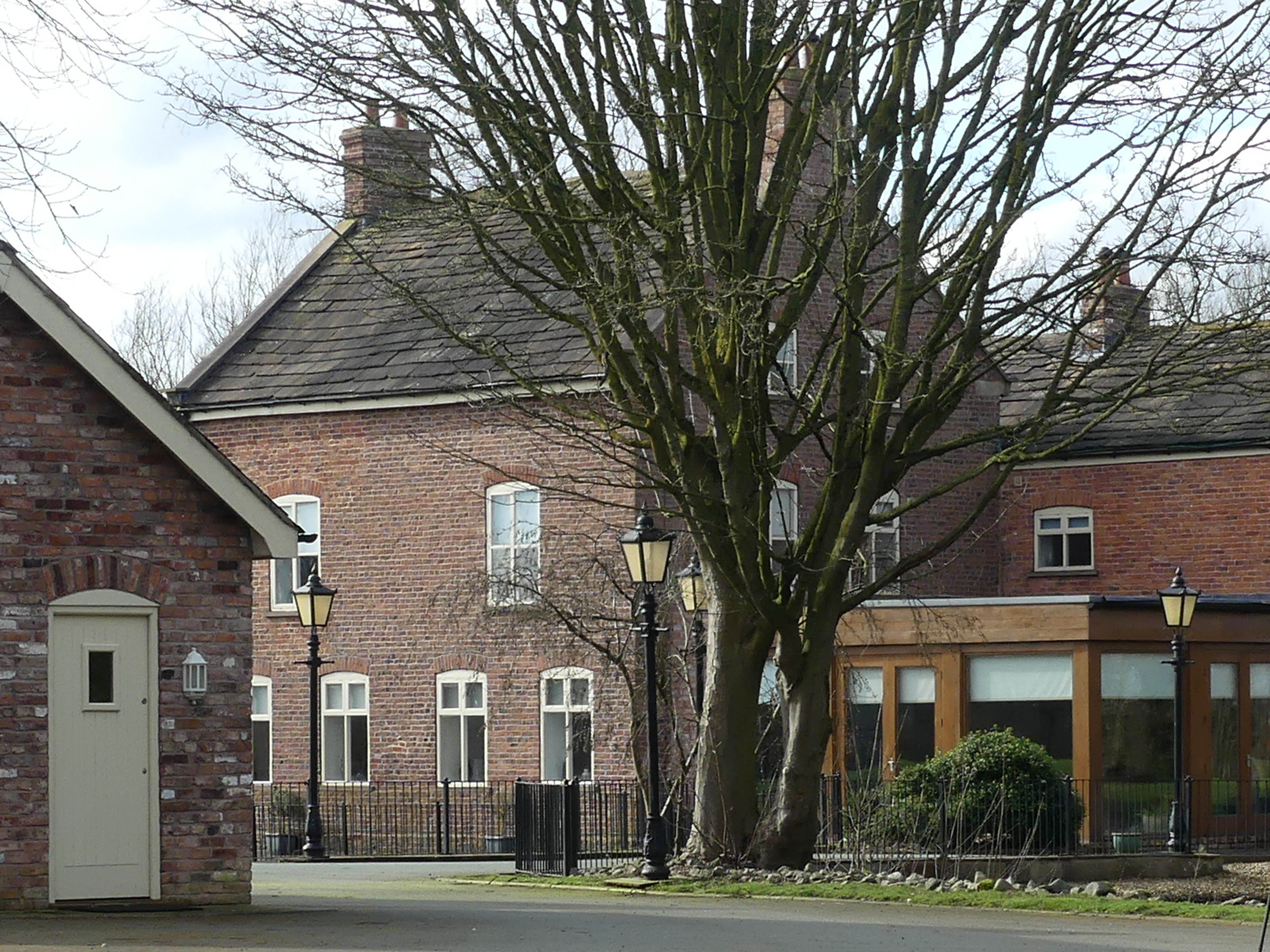
- Hulme Hall in 2024, following restoration

- Location within Cheshire

General information
- Location: Allostock, Cheshire West and Chester, England
- Coordinates: 53.24772°N 2.41406°W

Listed Building – Grade II*
- Official name: Hulme Hall
- Designated: 3 January 1967
- Reference no.: 1160324

Hulme Hall is a house on a moated site in the parish of Allostock, Cheshire, England. It originated in the 15th century, with additions and alterations in the 17th and 19th centuries. It is now a farmhouse. The house is constructed in brown brick, and has a roof of stone-slate and Welsh slate. It is in two storeys with an attic, and has an asymmetrical plan. The northeast front is the entrance front, and has three gabled bays. The garden front is on the northwest; it has five bays, two of which are stepped back in two stages. Most of the windows are two or three-light casements. The house is recorded in the National Heritage List for England as a designated Grade II* listed building. The bridge over the moat leading to the house is also listed at Grade II*. The moated site on which the house stands is a scheduled monument. It had been the home of the Grosvenor and Shakerley families, both of whom were prominent in Cheshire.

The building was in a state of considerable disrepair for over a decade and had been on the official "Heritage at Risk" register before a £1 million restoration was completed in 2014.

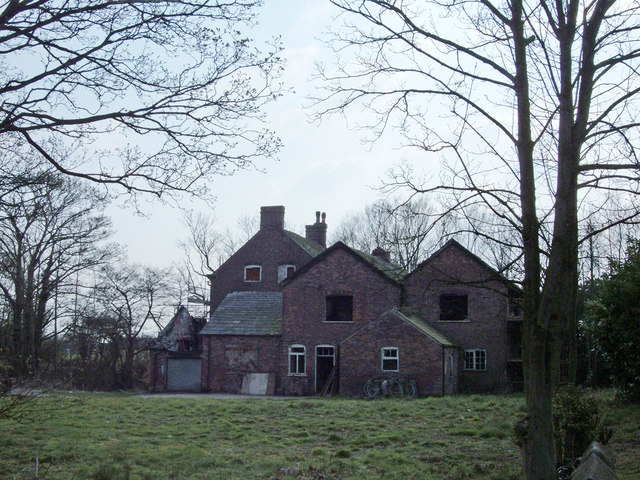
Hulme Hall before restoration

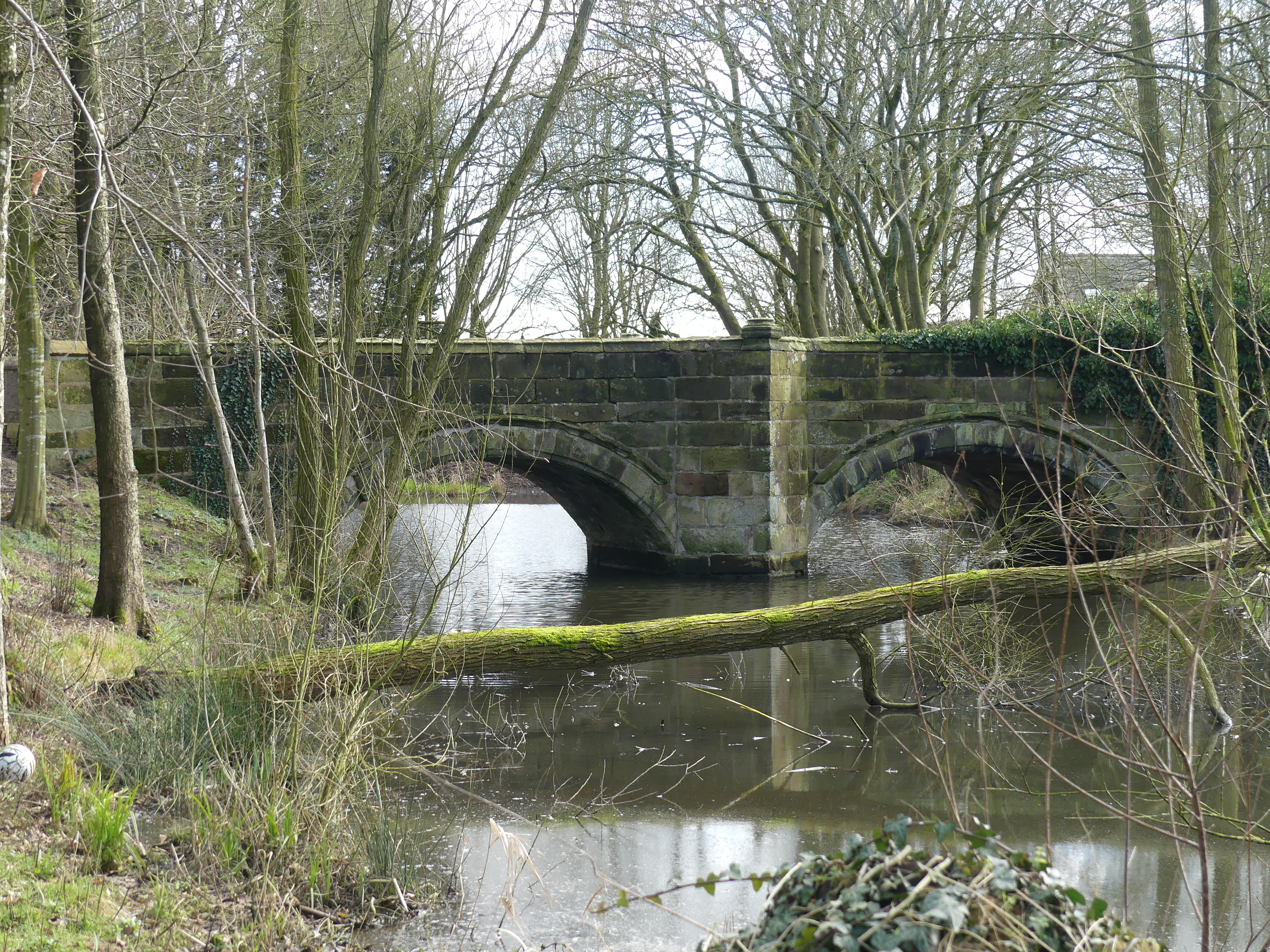
Bridge over moat

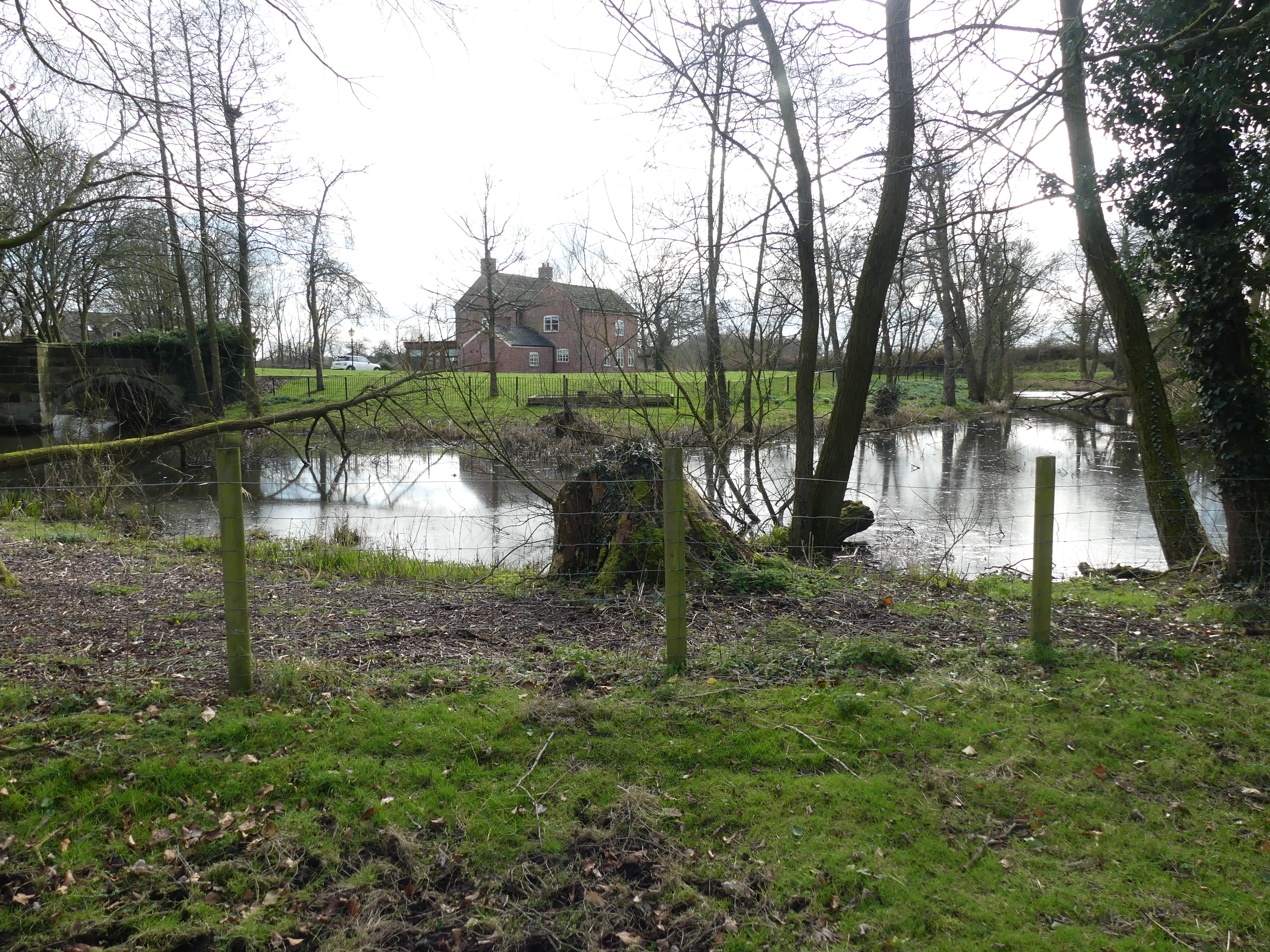
Moated site

== See also ==
- Grade II* listed buildings in Cheshire West and Chester
- Listed buildings in Allostock
