= Listed buildings in Anderton with Marbury =

Anderton with Marbury is a civil parish in Cheshire West and Chester, England, which contains the villages of Anderton and Marbury. The Trent and Mersey Canal runs through the parish. Also in the parish is the Anderton Boat Lift, a scheduled monument, which has been restored to carry boats from the canal down to the Weaver Navigation. In the parish are four buildings that are recorded in the National Heritage List for England as designated listed buildings, all of which are at Grade II. This grade is the lowest of the three gradings given to listed buildings and is applied to "buildings of national importance and special interest". The structures consist of a mill and the miller's house, a farmhouse, and a milepost on the canal.

Name and location	Photograph	Date	Notes
Marbury Mill; 53.2813°N 2.5285°W	—	17th century (probable)	A water-powered cornmill that has retained some of its original timber framing. A loft was added in the 19th century, and the building is largely plastered. There are four horizontally-sliding sash windows in the top storey, and the mill is roofed in slate. It is run by a cast iron breast-wheel.
Uplands Farmhouse; 53.2747°N 2.5202°W	—	c. 1700	This is a rendered building, probably on sandstone, with a slate roof. It is in 1½ storeys with a rear wing, also in 1½ storeys, and has a later central gabled porch.
Milepost; 53.27650°N 2.52765°W		Early 19th century (probable)	This is a cast iron milepost on the Trent and Mersey Canal consisting of a circular post and a plate inscribed with the distances to Preston Brook and Shardlow.
Marbury Mill House; 53.2812°N 2.5285°W	—	Mid-19th century	A house for the miller, constructed in brick with a slate roof. It is a symmetrical building in two storeys. The windows are casements, and dormers under half-gables. The end gables have bargeboards and finials.

== See also ==
- Listed buildings in Barnton
- Listed buildings in Comberbach
- Listed buildings in Great Budworth
- Listed buildings in Marston
- Listed buildings in Northwich
- Listed buildings in Wincham
