= Peover Inferior =

Civil parish in Cheshire, England

Coordinates: 53.260°N 2.392°W

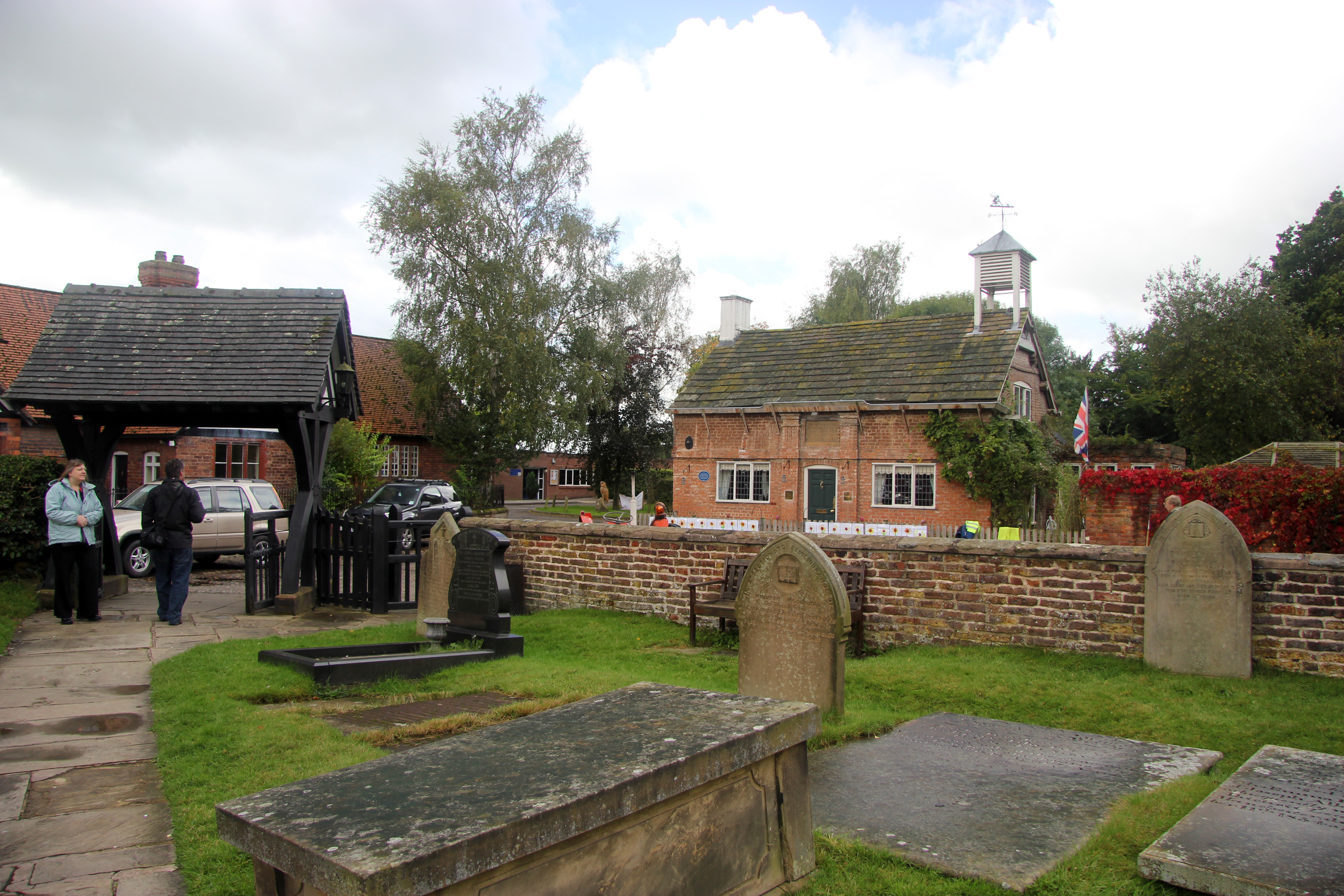
- St Oswald's graveyard and the Old School House

- Location within Cheshire
- Population: 220 (2011)
- OS grid reference: SJ7385373768
- Unitary authority: Cheshire East
- Ceremonial county: Cheshire
- Region: North West
- Country: England
- Sovereign state: United Kingdom
- Post town: KNUTSFORD
- Postcode district: WA16
- Dialling code: 01565
- Police: Cheshire
- Fire: Cheshire
- Ambulance: North West
- UK Parliament: Tatton

Peover Inferior is a civil parish in the Borough of Cheshire East and the ceremonial county of Cheshire, England. The village is known for its picturesque surrounding countryside and surprisingly convenient location. The name Peover is pronounced 'Peever' and derives from the Anglo-Saxon 'Peeffer' meaning 'a bright river', this 'bright river' being the River Peover which runs through the parish. The village and its neighbour Peover Superior lie on the river Peover, 'Inferior' here meaning downstream. The parish is situated on the B5081 roughly 25 km south south west of Manchester between Knutsford and Holmes Chapel and within five miles of junction 19 on the M6. Together with Nether Peover, it forms part of the village of Lower Peover, Lower Peover being the parish council. Peover Inferior is in Cheshire East, however Nether Peover is in Cheshire West, this often causes complications for the Lower Peover parish council. According to the 2011 census, it had a population (including Bexton and Toft) of 220.

== History ==
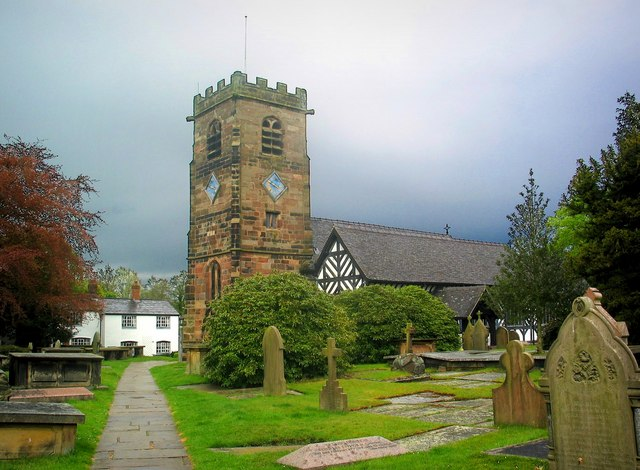
St Oswald's Church

The Domesday Book of 1086 describes the area previously known as Nether Peover as 'a small vill, waste and woodland, held by William Fitznigel from Earl Hugh'.

The parish developed around St Oswald's Church which lies on the parish boundary. A Chapel of Ease was built in 1269 by Richard Grosvenor of Hulme Hall, this was to save the long journey to worship at St Mary and All Saints Church in Great Budworth which is roughly 6 miles north west of the parish therefore making it relatively inaccessible by foot for the people of Lower Peover. St Mary and All Saints Church was incidentally the Lower Peover Chapel of Ease's mother church.

In 1464, Robert Grosvenor added a chantry chapel which was demolished in 1542 by order of Henry VIII. The Bog Oak chest housed in the Shakerley Chapel was used for many years to keep the Parish Register, vicars' robes, chalices and church documents. Tradition has it that if a girl wished to be a farmer's wife she should be able to lift the chest lid with one arm. It is believed that this tale originated because it was said that a farmer's wife in those days needed to be strong enough to be able to lift the famous Cheshire cheeses made in the area.

In the 15th century the Shakerley family, who continued the Grosvenor tradition of support for the church, inherited Hulme Hall. The Shakerley family crest, a hare and wheatsheaf, can still be seen on several of the box pews today. The church just consisted of an oak-framed nave, chancel and two aisles with east chapels until 1582 when the tower was built under the reign of Queen Elizabeth I. The latest modifications took place in 1851 by Anthony Salvin, an English architect, who altered the aisles and reroofed the nave and chancel.

The Warren de Tabley Arms Public House was built in the mid thirteenth century, it still stands today as a Grade I listed building however it has acquired a new name: The Bells of Peover. This name did not originate from its proximity to the church, but from the Bell family, who once lived there in the 1890s.

The Old School House, just outside the St Oswald's graveyard, was founded in 1710 by Richard Comberbach. Comberbach had been the curate of St Oswald's Church until his resignation in 1691. He acquired land off Sir James Leycester and built the original school building (which still stands today) with the aid of funds from his wife and farming. Comberbach, his wife and the curate of St Oswald's taught in the school until 1722 when they endowed £300 in the school trust. Profit from a further £100 investment was to be used for maintenance of the building and the purchasing of spelling books, Psalters, New Testaments and Bibles, any surplus was used in the encouragement of Latin or buying books for scholars. The original syllabus consisted of the teaching of English catechism. The St Oswald's curate continued to act as the headmaster with the aid of an assistant until the Education Act of 1870. Following this act, a new school was built next to the original site.

== Industry and Employment ==
Occupational data for 1881

The earliest occupational data for Peover Inferior is from 1881. The stacked bar chart presents a simplified version of the 1881 occupational data, using the 24 'Orders' used in the published reports for 1881, plus an 'Unknown' category. Many of these categories combine 'Workers and Dealers' in different commodities, so it is impossible to distinguish workers in manufacturing and services.

The graph shows that the most common occupation in Peover Inferior in 1881 was agriculture, this was probably due to the rural surroundings and abundance of arable land. Additionally, many sectors that exist today may have been very small or ceased to exist all together in the late 19th century therefore there was less choice of occupation. In contrast to agriculture, the majority of people working in the domestic service or offices were women however this was the only sector with a significant proportion of female workers because the majority of them had unspecified or unknown occupations.

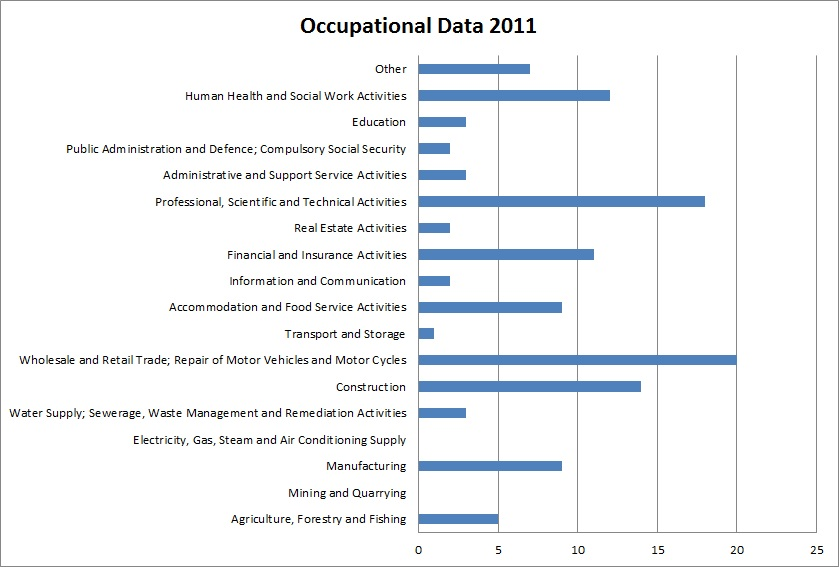
Occupational Data for 2011

According to the 2011 census, the sector with the highest level of employment in Peover Inferior is wholesale and retail trade and automotive repairs with 16.5% of the population followed closely behind by professional, scientific and technical activities with 14.9%. However, the pattern of these statistics is not just specific to Peover Inferior because these two sectors are among the largest in the North West and England.

73.7% of the parish's population are economically active and in employment, 12.3% are of the working age but unemployed, this leaves 14% of the population that have retired. The greatest number of residents are full-time employees with 33.5% of the total population followed closely behind by full-time self-employers with 26.2%.

The only retail outlet in Peover Inferior is The Smithy on Smithy Green which is a small shop that sells bird feeders and small garden ornaments. The nearest village shop is in Lower Peover roughly a mile away.

== Demography ==
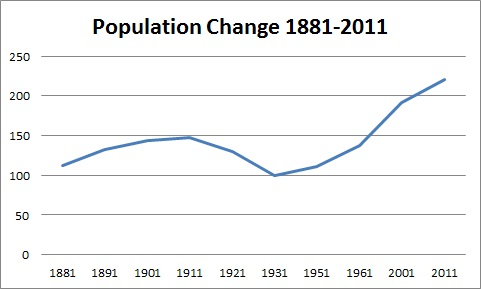
Population change 1881–2011

The earliest census records of Peover Inferior date back to 1881 when the total population was 112, this figure fluctuated until 1931 then it began to consistently increase. The latest census in 2011 recorded a population of 220, this is the highest recorded population in Peover Inferior. The current population density is 0.3 people per hectare which is extremely low compared to the average of 5 people per hectare for the North West region. The 2011 census recorded that 51.4% of the population were male and 48.6% were female therefore suggesting that the gender distribution is relatively well balanced. Peover Inferior is a very monocultural area with 96.8% of the population being white; English/Welsh/Scottish/Northern Irish/British and 98.7% being born within the United Kingdom. The parish is also a predominantly Christian area probably due to Christianity being the most widely practised religion in the UK and the high percentage of white British people.

=== Age Structure ===
The age structure in Peover Inferior has remained relatively static in recent years despite the ageing British population. In 2001, the most common age ranges were 30–44 and 45–49 and this did not change in the 2011 census. It could be suggested that the parish population is actually becoming younger because in 2001 there were 33 children aged 0–14 and in 2011 there were 44 aged 0–14, however this can be contested because the overall population has grown since 2001.

=== Housing ===
Peover Inferior has expanded vastly in the past century; the number of houses has almost quadrupled since 1881 however it still remains a very small village with 97 houses. The occupancy rate is relatively high with only 4% of houses unoccupied in 2001 with roughly the same rates in the early 1900s. The most common house composition is a one-person household (aged under 65) at 21.3%, followed closely behind by houses composing of one family with no children (19.1%) then one family with dependent children (18.1%).

== Geography ==
The parish boundary runs in an odd shape. The northern boundary runs along Ullard Hall Lane past Plumley Lane Farm, the eastern and western boundaries follow ancient field boundaries and footpaths which are now diverted or the hedges long removed and the southern part of the boundary goes around St Oswald's, through the Bells of Peover and the centre of the school. The parish covers 278 acres (1.13 km^{2}).

The bedrock in the area consists of triassic rock, mainly sandstone and conglomerate. There are no superficial deposits despite the parish being situated on a river.

== See also ==
- Listed buildings in Peover Inferior
