= Listed buildings in Caughall =

Caughall is a former civil parish, now in the parish of Backford, in Cheshire West and Chester, England. It contains two buildings that are recorded in the National Heritage List for England as designated listed buildings, both of which are at Grade II. This grade is the lowest of the three gradings given to listed buildings and is applied to "buildings of national importance and special interest".

Name and location	Photograph	Date	Notes
Parish boundary stone 53.22561°N 2.88849°W	—	Late 18th to early 19th century	This consists of a red sandstone block with a semicircular top, which is inscribed with initials.
Former stables 53.2260°N 2.8792°W	—	1886	Originally designed as stables for Oakfield Manor, these were later used as a lion house for Chester Zoo, and later for storage. They were probably designed by E. A. Ould, and have been altered since. They are constructed in brick with sandstone dressings and have a red tiled roof. The building is in one and two storeys, and has a five-bay front. Features include a semicircular archway, a circular stair turret with a hexagonal spired roof, a crow-steeped gable, and a ball finial.
