= Listed buildings in Newton-by-Tattenhall =

Newton-by-Tattenhall is a former civil parish, now in the parishes of Tattenhall and District and Hargrave and Huxley, in Cheshire West and Chester, Cheshire, England. It contains two buildings that are recorded in the National Heritage List for England as designated listed buildings, both of which are at Grade II. This grade is the lowest of the three gradings given to listed buildings and is applied to "buildings of national importance and special interest". The parish is entirely rural, and the listed buildings consist of a former watermill and a canal bridge.

Name and location	Photograph	Date	Notes
Higher Huxley Mill; 53.14225°N 2.74039°W	—	17th century or earlier	A watermill, initially timber-framed on a sandstone base, re-walled in brick in the 19th century. It has a Welsh slate roof. On the east side is the setting for an undershot waterwheel, and a weatherboarded loft jettied out over the stream. The mill is in two storeys, with a two-bay south front. Inside a spur wheel and a pair of millstones are present.
Dutton's Bridge; 53.13787°N 2.74320°W	—	c. 1779	An accommodation bridge crossing the Shropshire Union Canal. It was built for the Chester Canal company, and is in brick. The bridge consists of a segmental arch rising from stone imposts. It has curving wing walls, a plain parapet, and stone coping.
