= St Oswald's Church, Lower Peover =

Coordinates: 53.2639°N 2.3864°W

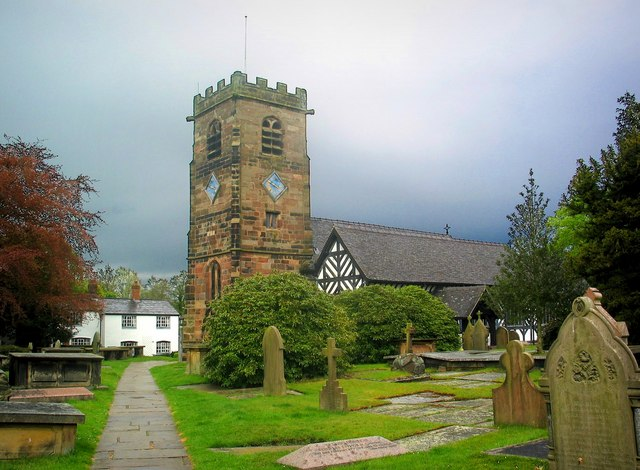
- St Oswald's Church, Lower Peover, from the southeast

- Location in Cheshire
- OS grid reference: SJ 744 743
- Location: Lower Peover, Cheshire
- Country: England
- Denomination: Anglican
- Website: St Oswald, Lower Peover

History
- Status: Parish church

Architecture
- Functional status: Active
- Heritage designation: Grade I
- Designated: 3 January 1967
- Architect: Anthony Salvin (restoration)
- Architectural type: Church
- Style: Tower Gothic, Body Idiosyncratic

Specifications
- Materials: Timber framing Sandstone tower

Administration
- Province: York
- Diocese: Chester
- Archdeaconry: Macclesfield
- Deanery: Knutsford
- Parish: Nether Peover

Clergy
- Priest: Rev'd Fr Murray Aldridge-Collins

St Oswald's Church is in the village of Lower Peover, Cheshire, England. It is recorded in the National Heritage List for England as a designated Grade I listed building. It is an active Anglican parish church in the diocese of Chester, the archdeaconry of Macclesfield and the deanery of Knutsford. Its benefice is combined with that of St Lawrence, Over Peover.

== History ==
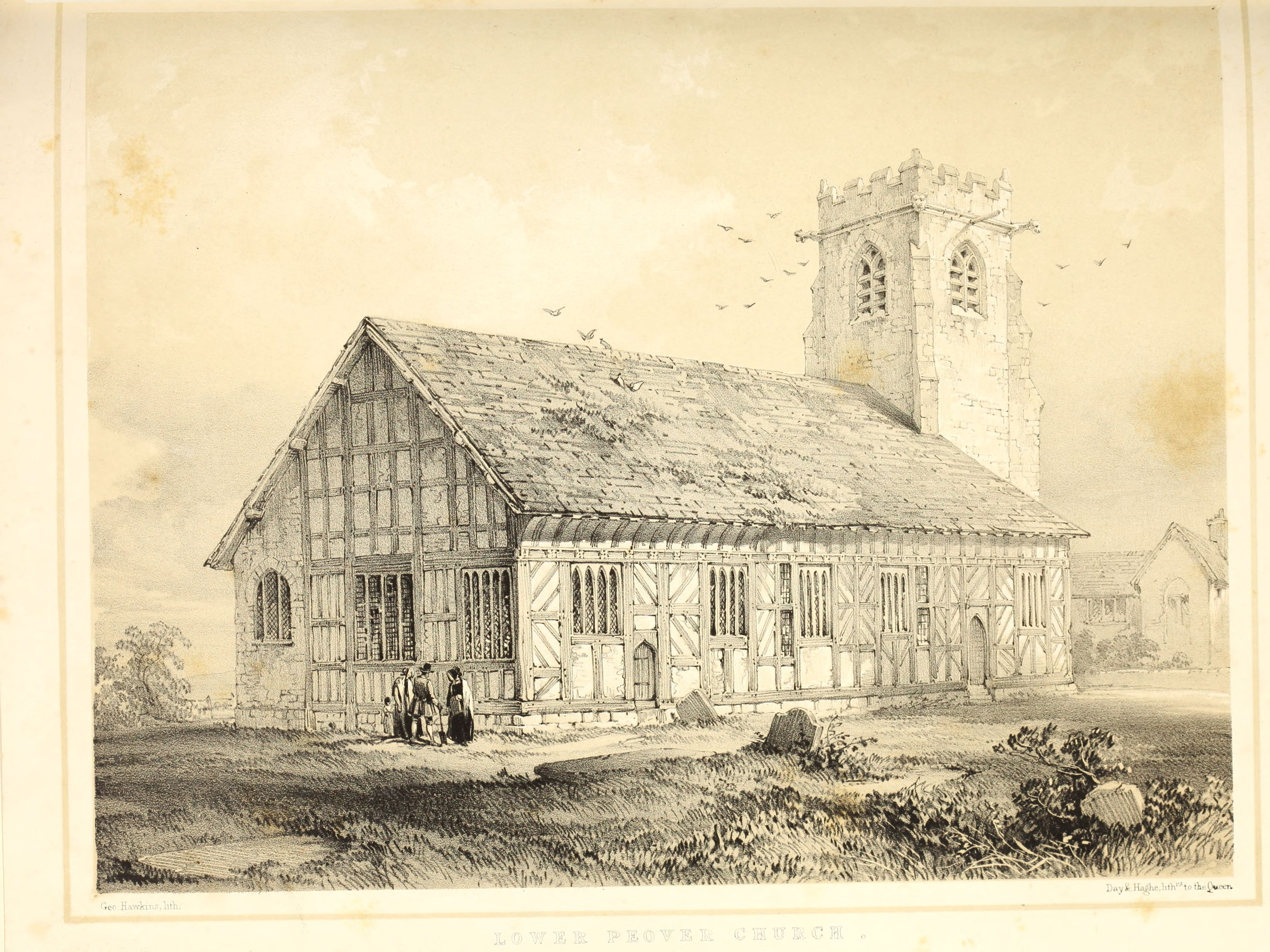
A drawing of the church as it appeared in the 1840s

A church has been on this site since at least 1269, when it was a chapel of ease to Great Budworth. The west tower dates from 1582, the mason being John Bowden. A south chapel was added around 1610, and the north chapel in 1624. The aisles were altered and re-roofed in 1852 by Anthony Salvin and there have been subsequent restorations.

== Architecture ==
=== Exterior ===
The tower is built in Alderley sandstone and the body of the church is timber framed. Its plan consists of a west tower, a nave and a chancel, with north and south aisles and chapels at their east ends. The tower has three stages, with a west door above which is a two-light window. On the north, west and south faces are lozenge-shaped clock-faces and two-light bell openings. The top of the tower is crenellated and on each corner are diagonal buttresses.

=== Interior ===
The north chapel is the Holford chapel, which is now used for the organ chamber and vestry. The south chapel is the Hulme or Grosvenor chapel, and at its east end, divided by a screen, is the small Shakerley chapel. The aisles are separated from the nave by an arcade of medieval octagonal oak piers. Many of the pews are Jacobean, as is the pulpit. The cylindrical font is of uncertain date, and was reputedly brought here from Norton Priory in 1322. The screen to the Holford chapel dates from the early 17th century, and the screen separating the chapel from the nave is dated 1642. The screen to the south chapel is Jacobean, consisting of four bays surmounted by three large spheres. In the chapel is a large 13th-century chest made from one piece of oak, 6 feet (2 m) in length and 2 feet (1 m) wide. In the church are two cupboards dated 1737 which were used for the distribution of the bread charities. Also in the church are memorials to the Shakerley, Leicester and Cholmondeley families. One of these is to Godfrey Shakerley who died in 1696 and another is to Katherine Shakerley who died in 1725.

The two-manual organ was built by Alexander Young of Manchester in 1880 and modified and overhauled in 1985 by G.Sixsmith and Son of Mossley. The parish registers date from 1570 and the churchwardens' accounts from 1699. There is a ring of six bells cast by John Warner and Sons in 1912.

== External features ==
In the churchyard is a sundial dating from the 18th century which consists of an octagonal shaft on square steps. The shaft has a square dial on a square stone head and a gnomon is present. It is listed Grade II. The lychgate dated around 1896 is also listed Grade II. The churchyard also contains the war grave of a Royal Navy officer of World War II.

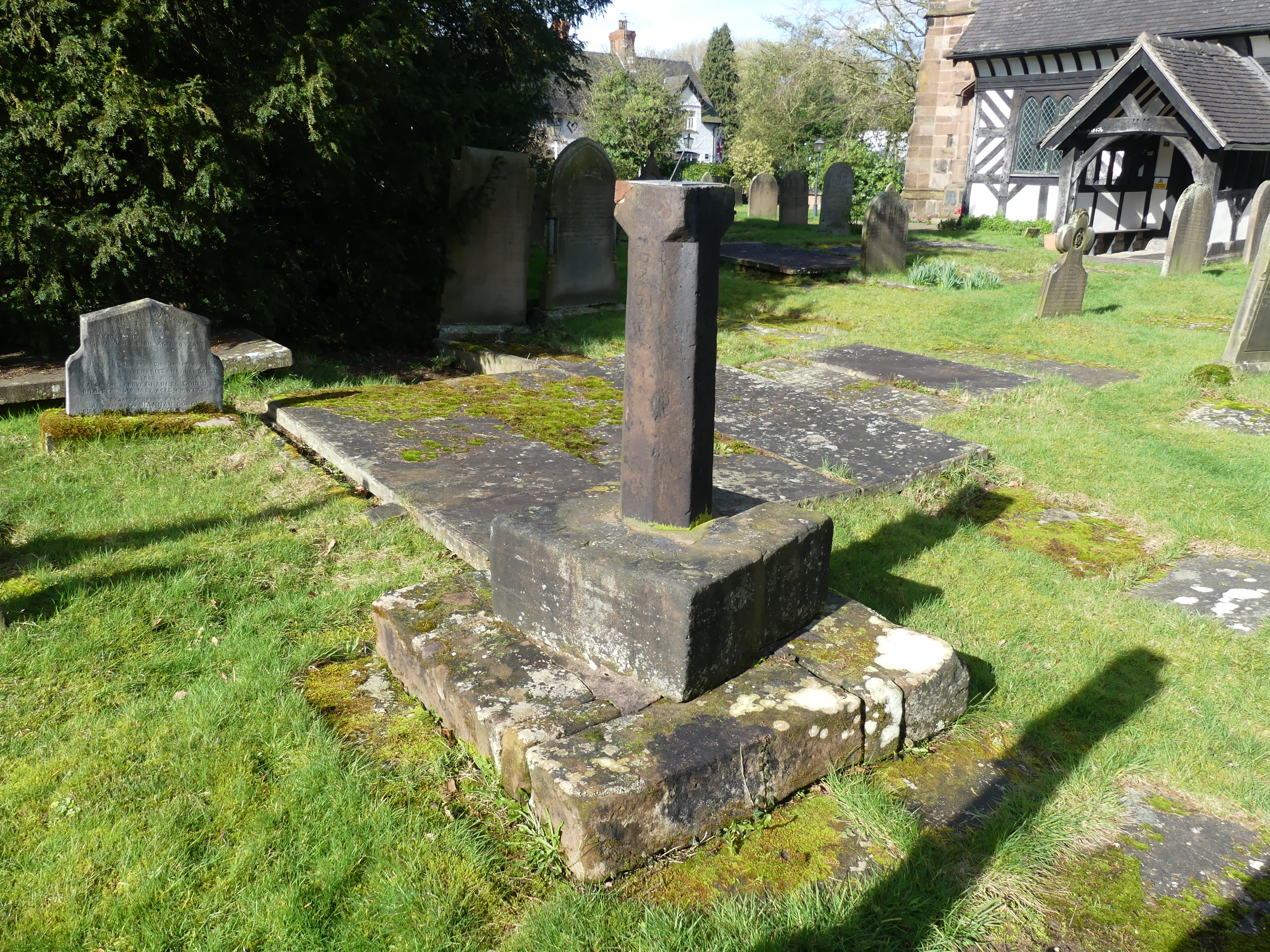
Sundial

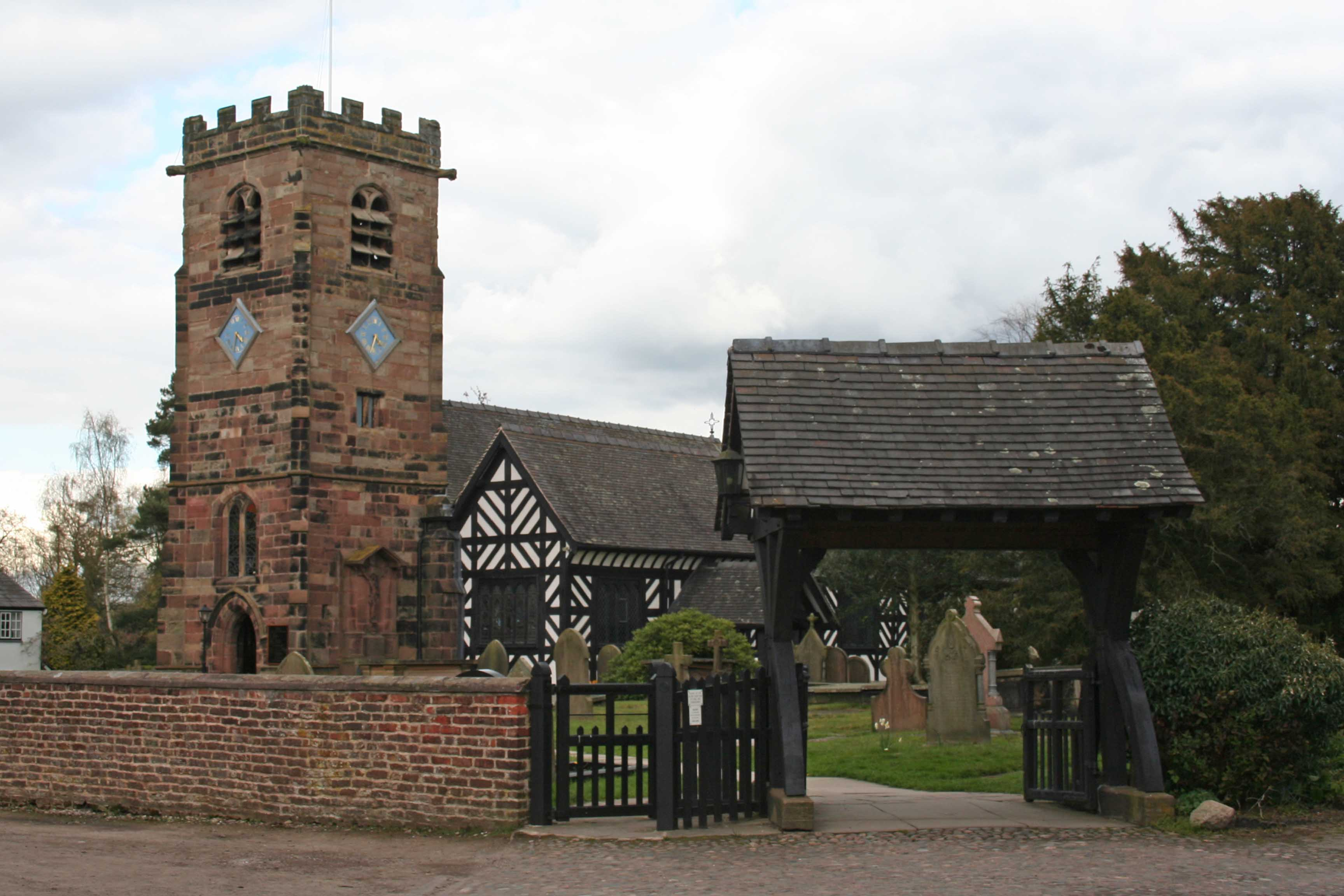
Lychgate

== See also ==
- Grade I listed buildings in Cheshire West and Chester
- Grade I listed churches in Cheshire
- Listed buildings in Nether Peover
- List of church restorations and alterations by Anthony Salvin
