= Listed buildings in Plumley =

Plumley is a civil parish in Cheshire East, England. It contains seven buildings that are recorded in the National Heritage List for England as designated listed buildings. Of these, one is listed at Grade II*, the middle grade, and the others are at Grade II. The parish is mainly rural, and the listed buildings consist of farmhouses, a farm building, a cottage, a country house with a bridge giving access to it, and a public house.

== Key ==
Grade	Criteria
II*	Particularly important buildings of more than special interest
II	Buildings of national importance and special interest

== Buildings ==
Name and location	Photograph	Date	Notes	Grade
Holford Hall; 53.27513°N 2.43781°W		1601	A timber-framed country house with rendered infill and stone-slate roofs. A wing containing a gallery was demolished in the 1880s. The house is in two storeys with an attic, the upper storey being slightly jettied. On the front are two gables, two Ionic pilasters, and consoles, one of which is carved with an animal's head. The windows are mullioned and transomed. The moated site on which the house stands is a scheduled monument.	II*
Smoker Inn; 53.28076°N 2.43617°W		17th century	A public house that was extended in the 18th, 19th and 20th centuries. It is built in brick that is partly rendered and is roofed partly in stone-slate and partly thatched. The public house is in two storeys, and on the front has a projecting gabled wing. To the left of this are two bow windows, the other windows being casements.	II
Bridge over moat, Holford Hall; 53.27528°N 2.43747°W		Late 17th century	A stone bridge crossing the moat. It consists of two segmental arches with voussoirs and a hood mould. In the middle of the bridge are two semicircular refuges containing seats and with decorated square finials.	II
Beech Farm; 53.26917°N 2.41088°W	—	Late 17th century	A timber-framed farmhouse with rendered brick infill and a thatched roof. The windows are casements, those in the upper floor being in dormers.	II
Holly Hedge Cottage; 53.27691°N 2.40768°W		Late 17th century	A timber-framed house on a stone plinth with rendered infill and a thatched roof. It is in two storeys, with casement windows in the lower floor and casements in dormers above. There is a 20th-century extension to the left.	II
Malt Kiln Farm; 53.27572°N 2.42592°W		Late 17th century	A timber-framed farmhouse with brick infill. It is in two storeys with an attic. The windows are casements and there is a door on the far left of the front.	II
The Smithy; 53.28118°N 2.43573°W		Early 18th century	A timber-framed former farm building on a brick plinth with rendered infill and a thatched roof. It is in a single storey, with a door and two one-light windows on the front.	II

== See also ==
- Listed buildings in Tabley Inferior
- Listed buildings in Toft
- Listed buildings in Peover Inferior
- Listed buildings in Nether Peover
- Listed buildings in Lostock Gralam
- Listed buildings in Wincham
- Listed buildings in Pickmere
