= Listed buildings in Nether Peover =

Nether Peover is a civil parish in Cheshire West and Chester, England. It contains twelve buildings that are recorded in the National Heritage List for England as designated listed buildings. St Oswald's Church is listed at Grade I; all the others are at Grade II. Apart from the village of Lower Peover, the parish is almost completely rural. This is reflected in the listed buildings which, apart from the church and its associated structures and the adjacent school, are either domestic buildings or related to farming.

== Key ==
Grade	Criteria
Grade I	Buildings of exceptional interest, sometimes considered to be internationally important.
Grade II	Buildings of national importance and special interest.

== Buildings ==
Name and location	Photograph	Date	Notes	Grade
St Oswald's Church, Lower Peover; 53.2639°N 2.3864°W		Late 14th century	The nave and chancel date probably from the late 14th and 15th centuries, the west tower was added in 1582, and the aisles were altered and re-roofed in 1852 by Anthony Salvin. The body of the church is timber-framed, and the tower is in sandstone.	I
Hulme Farmhouse; 53.2540°N 2.4048°W	—	Early 17th century (probable)	The lower part of the farmhouse is timber-framed with brick nogging, and the upper part, added later, is in brick. It is in two storeys, and has a slate roof. There is a central timber-framed gabled dormer; the other windows are casements.	II
Old School House; 53.2637°N 2.3874°W		1645	This originated as a school house, it was altered in 1710 and 1883, and is now a cottage. It is constructed in brick with a stone-slate roof. The building is in 1½ storeys, and has a symmetrical front. The windows include casements, sliding sash windows, and a 20th-century oriel window. There is a replaced bellcote on the right gable.	II
Foxcovert Cottage South; 53.2533°N 2.3869°W	—	Mid-17th century	This is a timber-framed cottage with mainly brick nogging, and probably some plaster panels. It is in one storey with an attic, and has a thatched roof. It has two casement windows, and a dormer in the attic with a replaced casement window.	II
Barn, Yew Tree Farm; 53.2576°N 2.3935°W	—	Mid-17th century (probable)	The barn is timber-framed with brick nogging. It was probably originally thatched, but now has a roof of cement slates. At each end is a lean-to extension.	II
Foxcovert Cottage North; 53.2536°N 2.3870°W		Mid-17th century (probable)	The cottage is timber-framed, mainly with brick nogging, and with some plaster panels. It is in one storey with an attic, and has a thatched roof. It has three casement windows, and two eyebrow dormers in the attic.	II
Crown Lane Farmhouse; 53.2609°N 2.3937°W	—	Late 17th century (probable)	The brick farmhouse has a slate roof. It consists of a symmetrical three-bay main block of 2½ storeys and, to the left, a single-bay wing in two storeys. The central bay of the main block has a pedimented doorcase with a gable above. The windows are casements. Inside are oak beams and a dog-leg staircase.	II
Foxcovert Farmhouse; 53.2530°N 2.3917°W		Late 17th century (probable)	The farmhouse was refurbished in 1818. It is constructed in brick with slate roofs, and is in two storeys. It consists of a three-bay main block, and a single-bay wing to the left. There is a single-storey lean-to at the right side. The house has a gabled porch and casement windows.	II
Sundial, St Oswald's Church; 53.26379°N 2.38663°W		18th century	The stone sundial stands in the churchyard to the south of the church. It consists of an octagonal shaft set askew on a base of square steps. It carries a square head with a dial and a gnomon.	II
Millbank Farmhouse; 53.2589°N 2.3830°W		Early 19th century (probable)	The farmhouse is in brick with tiled roofs, and consists of a main wing and a cross-wing. There is a gabled porch in the angle between the wings. The building is in two storeys, and the windows are casements. Oak beams inside the cross-wing suggest that this part of the building may be of 17th-century origin.	II
School and schoolmaster's house 53.2635°N 2.3872°W		1870s	The buildings are in brick and timber framing with tiled roofs. The school is in a long single storey, and the house is in 1½ storeys. The windows are mullioned, and both buildings have black-and-white gables.	II
Lychgate, St Oswald's Church; 53.26364°N 2.38707°W		c. 1896	The lychgate stands at the entrance to the churchyard. It is timber-framed, standing on monolithic sandstone plinths, and has a gabled tiled roof.	II

== See also ==
- Listed buildings in Peover Inferior
- Listed buildings in Peover Superior
- Listed buildings in Allostock
- Listed buildings in Lach Dennis
- Listed buildings in Plumley
