= Lach Dennis =

Village in Cheshire, England

Coordinates: 53.244°N 2.441°W

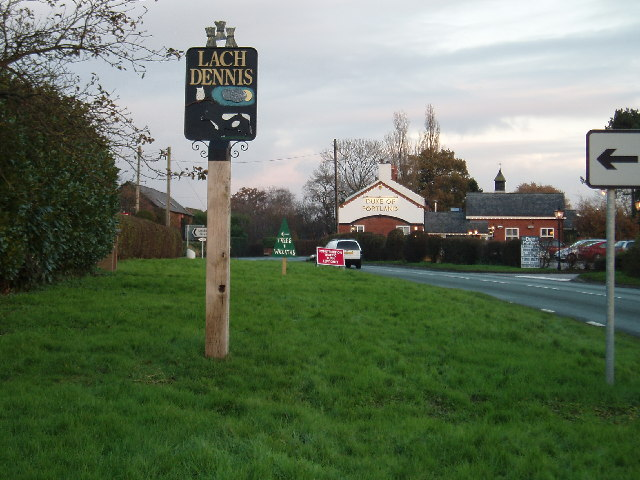
- Lach Dennis and The Duke of Portland public house

- Location within Cheshire
- Population: 232 (2011)
- OS grid reference: SJ706720
- Civil parish: Lach Dennis and Lostock Green
- Unitary authority: Cheshire West and Chester
- Ceremonial county: Cheshire
- Region: North West
- Country: England
- Sovereign state: United Kingdom
- Post town: NORTHWICH
- Postcode district: CW9
- Dialling code: 01606
- Police: Cheshire
- Fire: Cheshire
- Ambulance: North West
- UK Parliament: Tatton

Lach Dennis is a village in the civil parish of Lach Dennis and Lostock Green, in the unitary authority area of Cheshire West and Chester and the ceremonial county of Cheshire, England. The civil parish population at the 2011 census was 232. It is located approximately 2 miles (3.2 km) east of Northwich.

== History ==
Lach Dennis was included as a land to Vale Royal Abbey by Edward I. Abbot Walter exchanged the estates with Randle de Merton for Merton, so early as the reign of Edward VI. The Shakerleys had property here, as had also the Venables of Antrobus. The resident proprietors are the executors of the late Cranage Antrobus, Alfred Low, Esq., Mr Jonathan Butters, and Mr France.

On 1 February 2023 the parish was renamed from "Lach Dennis" to "Lach Dennis and Lostock Green".

== Geography ==
There are 209 acres (0.85 km^{2}) of land in this township.

== See also ==
- Listed buildings in Lach Dennis
