= Listed buildings in Peover Inferior =

Peover Inferior is a civil parish in Cheshire East, England. It contains five buildings that are recorded in the National Heritage List for England as designated listed buildings, all of which are at Grade II. This grade is the lowest of the three gradings given to listed buildings and is applied to "buildings of national importance and special interest". The parish is almost entirely rural, and the listed buildings consist of four houses and a public house.

Name and location	Photograph	Date	Notes
Barrows Brow Farmhouse and Cottage; 53.26545°N 2.38436°W	—	Early 17th century	A farmhouse later converted into two dwellings. Originally timber-framed it was recased in brick in the 19th century, and it has a tiled roof. The building is in two storeys, there is a porch on the front and a lean-to extension on the left side. The windows are casements. Inside there is some surviving timber-framing, including crucks.
Free Green Cottage; 53.26168°N 2.37501°W	—	Late 17th century	A timber-framed house with rendered brick infill on a plinth of stone and brick. It is in two storeys. There are six casement windows in the ground floor and a three-light casement in a dormer. To the left is a 20th-century extension similar in appearance.
Smithy Green Cottage; 53.26826°N 2.38474°W	—	Late 17th to early 18th century	Originally two cottages, later converted into one house. It is timber-framed with whitewashed brick infill and a tiled roof, and is in two storeys. The windows are casements.
Bells of Peover public house 53.26400°N 2.38711°W		Early 18th century	A public house in whitewashed brick with a slate roof in two storeys that was extended in the 19th century. The porch is in the original section, with additions on each side containing bay windows. The windows are casements, and there are two gabled half-dormers.
Broom Lane Cottage; 53.26630°N 2.38375°W	—	1741	A brick house with a tiled roof, it is in two storeys, and has a two-bay front. In the centre is a gabled porch, above which is a datestone. The windows are casements. There is a single-storey lean-to extension to the right, a conservatory to the left, and more extensions at the rear. Inside the house is some timber-framing.

== See also ==
- Listed buildings in Toft
- Listed buildings in Peover Superior
- Listed buildings in Nether Peover
- Listed buildings in Plumley
