= Marston, Cheshire =

Village and civil parish in Cheshire, England

Coordinates: 53.275°N 2.496°W

Marston
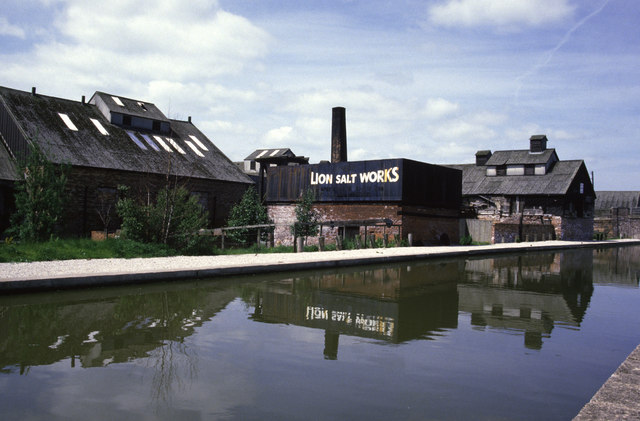
- Lion Salt Works, Marston

- Location within Cheshire
- Area: 1.32 sq mi (3.4 km^{2})
- Population: 538
  - Density: 408/sq mi (158/km^{2})
- OS grid reference: SJ 6702 7545
- Unitary authority: Cheshire West and Chester
- Ceremonial county: Cheshire
- Region: North West
- Country: England
- Sovereign state: United Kingdom
- Post town: NORTHWICH
- Postcode district: CW9

Marston is a village and civil parish within the unitary authority of Cheshire West and Chester, in Cheshire, North West England. It is sited beside the River Weaver, close to Anderton and the Anderton Boat Lift. The nearest major settlement is Manchester, which lies 15 miles (24 km) to the north-east. It is the site of the Lion Salt Works, which is now an industrial museum.

== Landscape ==
Marston lies west of the Peak District on the Cheshire Plain. Superficial Alluvium deposits on the West side of Marston has produced higher, fluctuating topography in this area as well as glaciofluvial deposits on the South side producing a ridge by Wincham Brook. The surrounding flat areas are composed of Devensian Till.

== History ==
One of Marston's defining features is its old salt mine. First worked on since around 1777, the mine covers an excavated area of 85 acres.

In 1884:

"one salt mine, the most noticeable, was visited by the Emperor Nicholas of Russia".

Since then the mine has been illuminated with over 10,000 lights, used for banquets and visited by distinguished members of the British Association in 1854. The new lighting and visit by the British Association attracted almost 1,000 individuals to the mine in one day.

In 1874 the Church of St Paul was erected. Designed by Mr. Douglas, architect of Chester, in the Early English style, it consists of an organ chamber on the south side, nave, north aisle with porch and a low spire and turret containing one bell.

== Population, institutional and occupational history ==
Historically Marston was a Township in the Great Budworth Parish (Bucklow Hundred, SJ 6776) and became a Civil Parish in 1866. Between 1837 and 2009 Marston had been part of 5 Registration districts- Northwhich (1837–1974), Vale Royal (1974–1998), Cheshire Central (1998–2007), Cheshire (2007–2009) and Cheshire West and Chester (2009+). In 1889 Marston's area was reduced by 272 acres due to a boundary change- Wincham, east of Marston, gained this area which included 18 individuals as well as Jackson's and Barber's Farm. Marston had a population of 538 according to the 2011 census.

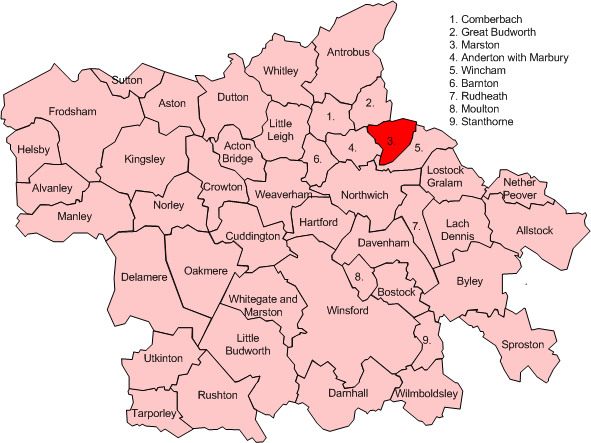
Map of civil parish of Marston within the former borough of Vale Royal

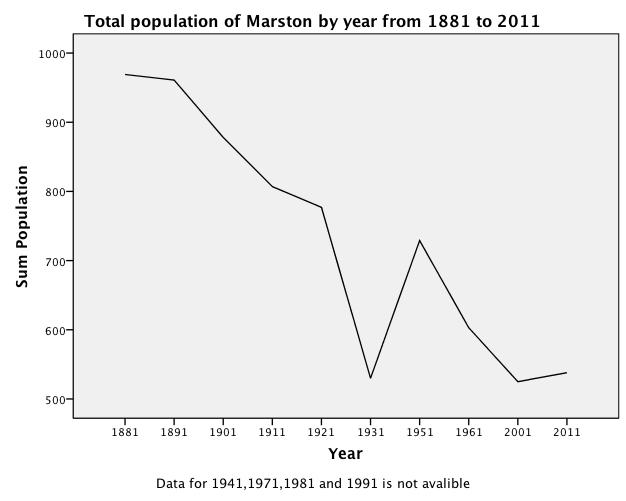
Population of Marston, 1881–2011.

In 1881 the primary occupation (making up 12.4% of the total population) was "Worker in Mineral Substances". This large section of employment would have been due to Marstons extensive salt mine. At this time period workers in this industry where all male- 23% of males worked in this industry in 1881.

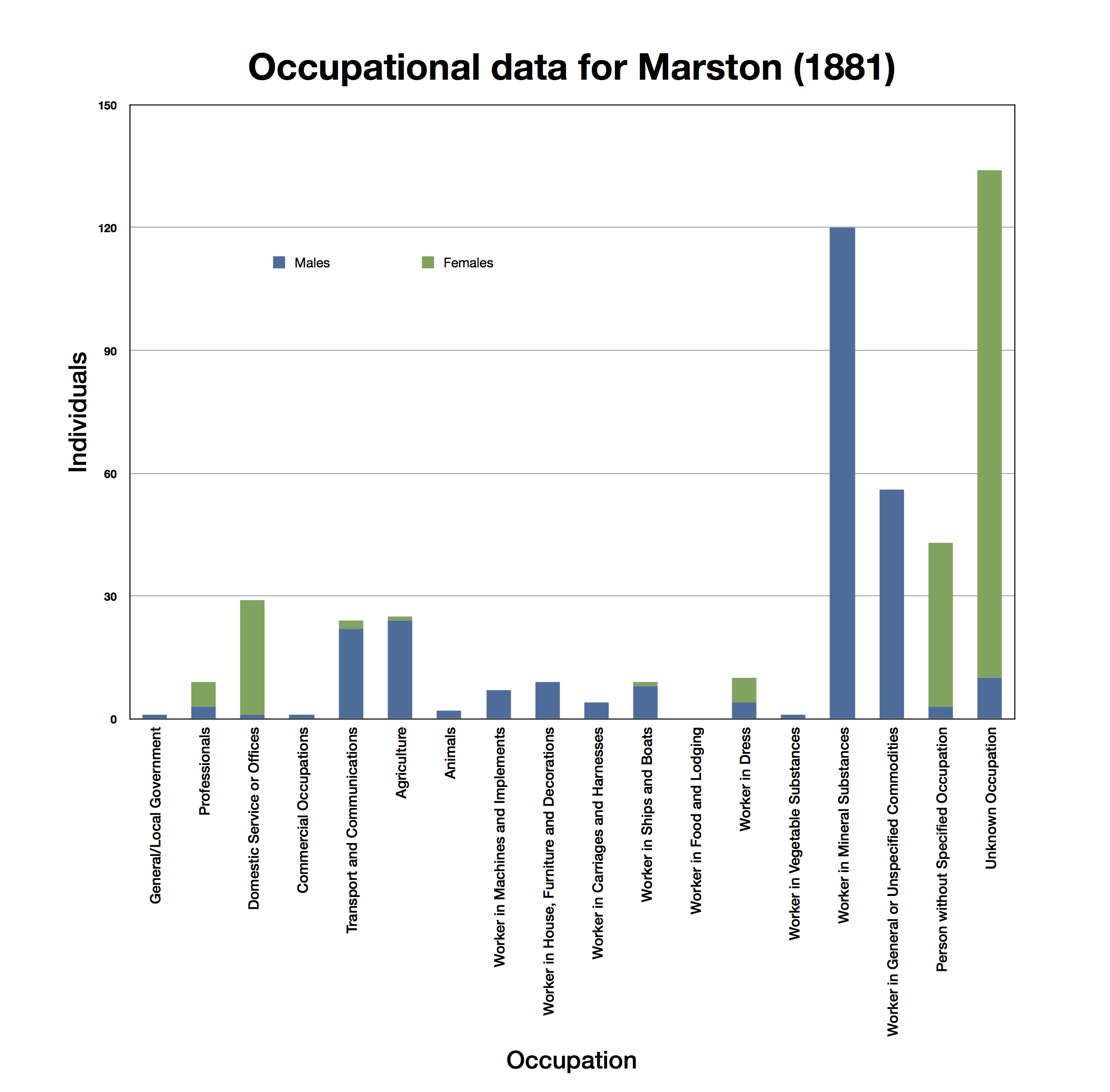
Graph to show individuals occupation by male and female in 1881.

== See also ==
- Listed buildings in Marston, Cheshire
