= Listed buildings in Allostock =

Allostock is a civil parish in Cheshire West and Chester, England. It contains twelve buildings that are recorded in the National Heritage List for England as designated listed buildings. Of these, two are listed at Grade II*, namely Hulme Hall, and the bridge over its moat. The other buildings are all listed at Grade II. They are all domestic buildings, or related to farming, reflecting the rural nature of the parish.

== Key ==
Grade	Criteria
Grade II*	Particularly important buildings of more than special interest.
Grade II	Buildings of national importance and special interest.

== Buildings ==
Name and location	Photograph	Date	Notes	Grade
Hulme Hall; 53.2477°N 2.4141°W		15th century	Alterations and additions were made in the 17th and 19th centuries. The house is constructed in brick with slate and stone-slate roofs. It has an asymmetrical plan, with two storeys and an attic. The entrance front has three gabled bays, and the garden front has five bays. The moated site on which the house stands is a scheduled monument.	II*
Bridge over moat Hulme Hall; 53.24818°N 2.41371°W		15th century	The bridge is built in sandstone and has two segmental arches. The citwaters rise as buttresses to parapet level, where they form seats.	II*
Bradshawbrook Farmhouse; 53.2484°N 2.3941°W	—	Mid-17th century	This originated as a timber-framed farmhouse with an H-shaped plan, and with wings that were jettied at the first floor level. Subsequent alterations and additions have resulted in a mainly brick house with slate roofs, and a double-depth plan. It is in two storeys, with three bays. The windows are a mix of casements and sashes.	II
Booth Bed Farmhouse; 53.2385°N 2.3613°W	—	Late 17th century	The farmhouse is constructed in brick with a slate roof. It is in three storeys, with a two-bay front. Extensions have been added to both sides and to the rear, giving the house a T-shaped plan. The windows are casements.	II
Brookhouse Farmhouse; 53.2386°N 2.3789°W	—	Late 17th century	A two-storey brick house with an attic, a slate roof, and with an L-shape plan. The front block is in three bays, and the rear wing is in two. The windows are casements. The upper contains timber-framed internal walls.	II
London Road House; 53.2366°N 2.3838°W	—	Late 17th century	A house constructed in brick and timber framing with brick and plaster nogging and plaster. The house is in one storey with an attic, and the roof is thatched . The front is in two bays, and has a thatched porch. The ground floor contains casement windows, and the windows in the upper floor are dormers. At the rear is a later extension.	II
Barn, London Road House; 53.2367°N 2.3838°W	—	Late 17th century	Constructed in a mix of brick and timber framing with brick nogging and a slate roof, the barn has been converted for domestic use. An upper storey has been added above part of the building. It is in five bays and contains casement windows.	II
Sculshaw Lodge; 53.2403°N 2.4136°W	—	Late 17th century	A country house with later additions and alterations. It is constructed in whitened stuccoed brick with slate roofs. The house is in two storeys with an attic and basement. The main block has five bays, and there is a later single-bay wing on each side. The main block contains recessed sash windows, and in the side wings are casements.	II
Fallow Cottage; 53.2456°N 2.3920°W		Early 18th century	The cottage is timber-framed with whitened brick nogging and a tiled roof. The upper storey has been raised in brick. It is in a single storey with an attic, and has two bays with a lean-to on the left. The windows are casements.	II
Townfield Farmhouse; 53.2480°N 2.3794°W		Late 18th century	The farmhouse is constructed in brick with a slate roof. It is in two storeys, with a three-bay front. The windows are casements.	II
Mill House Farmhouse; 53.2517°N 2.3676°W	—	Early 19th century	A farmhouse in brick with a slate roof; there were later additions and alterations. It is in two storeys, with a three-bay front. The windows are casements.	II
Stable, Sculshaw Lodge; 53.2404°N 2.4133°W	—	Mid-19th century	A brick building in an L-shaped plan with a slate roof. It is in two storeys. The main block has four bays, and the rear wing has three bays. In the ground floor are hopper windows, and the upper storey contains breathers in the shape of a cross. On the central ridge is a louvred vent with a hipped zinc roof.	II

== See also ==
- Listed buildings in Byley
- Listed buildings in Cranage
- Listed buildings in Goostrey
- Listed buildings in Lach Dennis
- Listed buildings in Nether Peover
- Listed buildings in Peover Superior
