= Plumley =

English village

Coordinates: 53.276°N 2.424°W

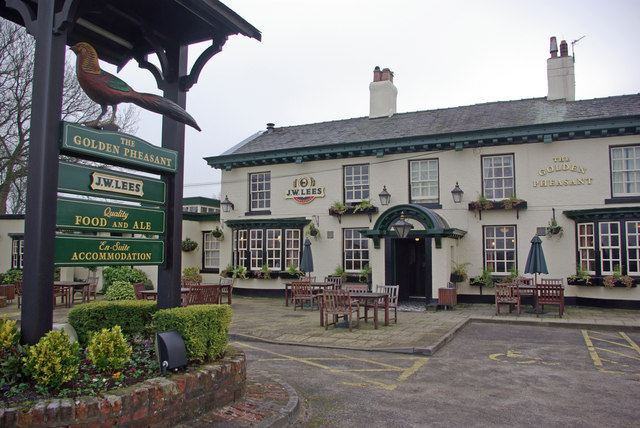
- The Golden Pheasant public house, Plumley

- Location within Cheshire
- Population: 643 (Including Doddington; 2011)
- OS grid reference: SJ716755
- Civil parish: Plumley
- Unitary authority: Cheshire East
- Ceremonial county: Cheshire
- Region: North West
- Country: England
- Sovereign state: United Kingdom
- Post town: KNUTSFORD
- Postcode district: WA16
- Dialling code: 01565
- Police: Cheshire
- Fire: Cheshire
- Ambulance: North West
- UK Parliament: Tatton

Plumley is a village and civil parish in the unitary authority of Cheshire East and the ceremonial county of Cheshire, England. It had a population of 643 at the 2011 census.

There are two public houses, The Golden Pheasant and The Smoker. Plumley railway station is on the Mid-Cheshire Line and has regular services to Manchester and Chester.

== Plumley salt cavities ==
In 1949, following a study carried out in 1947, the ICI Company was commissioned by the Ministry of Fuel and Power to develop a small salt cavity in the ICI Brinefield at Holford near Plumley. It was constructed by leaching out brine and designed to be able to hold approximately 5,000 cubic metres of petroleum. It was filled with gas oil and regularly tested for any deterioration in the quality of the product.

The location for the possible salt cavity site was ideal as it was close to the Stanlow Refinery, a number of existing petroleum storage depots and the government pipeline network. In 1951 the government decided to build 34 full-sized cavities. They were designed to hold approximately 1.2 million tons of petroleum product giving the site a capacity approximately six times greater than any of the existing government storage depots.

The Ministry of Fuel and Power therefore purchased approximately 200 acres of suitable land from ICI near Plumley. ICI were contracted to excavate the salt cavities while Shell was contracted to carry out all the other associated engineering works. These were extensive and included all the necessary ancillary facilities, connecting the Plumley site to the existing pipeline system, to the Shell refinery at Stanlow and to a new storage depot to be built at Goostrey.

Following the Suez Crisis of 1956, the Ministry of Power decided that the storage capacity at Plumley should be doubled. This was achieved by increasing the volume of each cavity. Work started in January 1959, but could only progress quite slowly as each cavity had to be emptied of product and then leached out and was not completed until July 1963.

The government required that all oil refineries in this country had to keep 90 days' supply of crude oil in Great Britain. To meet that requirement, a number of oil companies stored crude oil in the salt cavities at Plumley. However, they had to enter into an exchange deal with Shell, as the only refinery that could easily use the crude oil was Shell Stanlow. There were also problems with operations at Plumley in the build-up of sludge from the crude oil in the cavities. It was found that sludge was building up at a rate that increased with the movement in and out of the cavities. Therefore, the cavities hired by Shell and the most frequently used for the Stanlow refinery had the largest accumulation of sludge.

A second problem with the cavities used for the storage of crude oil was that the extraction rate, at 7,200 cubic metres per day, was too slow. A system for the removal of fuel from the cavities at a much higher flow-rate of around 25,000 cubic metres per day had been installed as part of the original design. This involved the use of two water-pumping stations at Acton Bridge on the River Weaver connected to Plumley by two 14-inch (360 mm) water mains. This system, however, could only be used in an emergency as it would wash out some of the cavity until after two such operations it would fail.

During the 1970s the use of the salt cavities declined. In 1975 and 1976 the Department of Energy, at the insistence of the Treasury, considerably increased the charges for the use of Plumley. However, this resulted in three of the oil companies removing their product from the cavities leading to a dramatic drop in income. Around 1980 BNOC, who managed Plumley on behalf of the DoE, concluded that approximately £500,000 would need to be spent over a two-year period to keep it operational. In the early 1980s, as the DoE no longer required the storage of civil ground fuels for use in an emergency, the salt cavities were emptied of product, although they were retained as an asset for possible future usage.

== See also ==
- Listed buildings in Plumley
