= Rudheath =

Village in Cheshire, England

Coordinates: 53.25°N 2.483°W

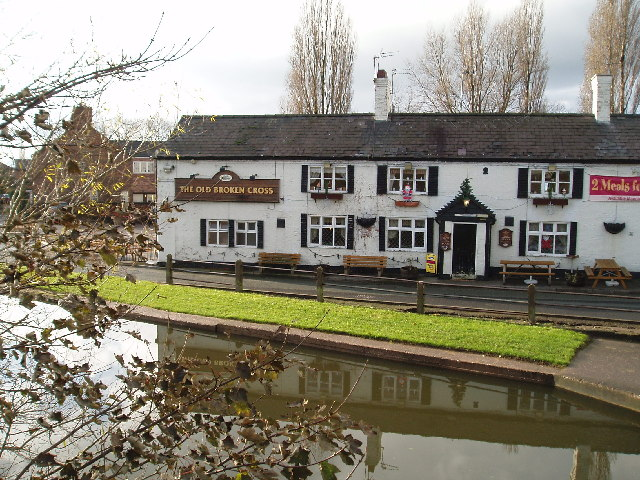
- The Old Broken Cross public house, Rudheath

- Location within Cheshire
- Population: 3,807 (2011)
- OS grid reference: SJ677726
- Civil parish: Rudheath
- Unitary authority: Cheshire West and Chester
- Ceremonial county: Cheshire
- Region: North West
- Country: England
- Sovereign state: United Kingdom
- Post town: NORTHWICH
- Postcode district: CW9
- Dialling code: 01606
- Police: Cheshire
- Fire: Cheshire
- Ambulance: North West
- UK Parliament: Tatton

Rudheath is a village and civil parish in the unitary authority of Cheshire West and Chester and the ceremonial county of Cheshire, in the north west of England, approximately 2 miles east of Northwich. The civil parish also includes the area of Broken Cross. The population of the civil parish as taken at the 2011 census was 3,807. Rudheath has a parish council, the lowest level of local government.

Rudheath is the location of Rudheath Primary Academy, and the Rudheath Senior Academy. Both schools provide education to school-age children from the village and the surrounding area.

Contemporary major local employers include Frank Roberts & Sons, a bakery that has been associated with the area since 1887. Two of Frank Roberts & Sons's three main business divisions, Roberts Bakery and The Little Treats Co, are based on the A556 in Rudheath and Aldred's The Bakers, is located in Ilkeston, Derbyshire. Morrisons supermarket has a large distribution centre on the A530, while Orange, Barclays Bank and The Hut Group all have business centres at Gadbrook Park, off the A556.

Broken Cross was named for a wayside cross which formerly stood at the junction of King Street and Penny's Lane, and was probably broken by the 17th century. A farm and the Old Broken Cross public house were named for the former cross.

== See also ==
- Listed buildings in Rudheath
