= Lower Peover =

Village in Cheshire, England

Coordinates: 53.266°N 2.383°W

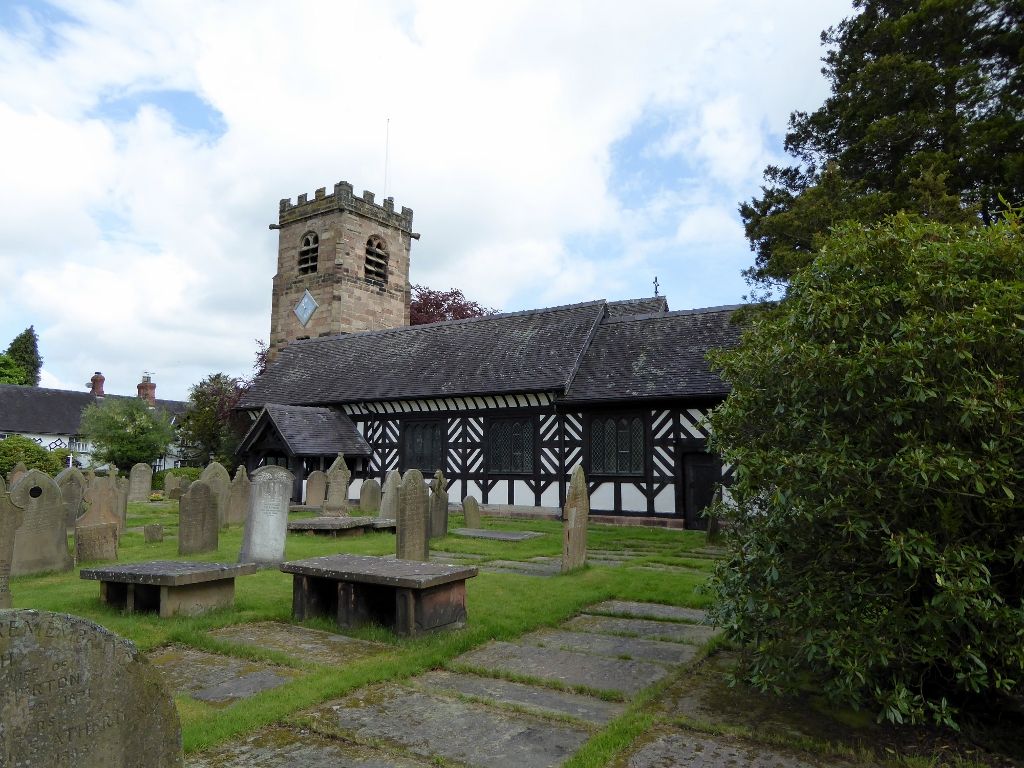
- St. Oswald's Church, Lower Peover

- Location within Cheshire
- OS grid reference: SJ743741
- Civil parish: Nether Peover
- Unitary authority: Cheshire West and Chester
- Ceremonial county: Cheshire
- Region: North West
- Country: England
- Sovereign state: United Kingdom
- Post town: KNUTSFORD
- Postcode district: WA16
- Dialling code: 01565
- Police: Cheshire
- Fire: Cheshire
- Ambulance: North West
- UK Parliament: Tatton

Lower Peover is a village in the civil parish of Nether Peover in the unitary authority of Cheshire West and Chester and the ceremonial county of Cheshire, England, approximately 6 miles east of Northwich and 4 miles south of Knutsford. The boundary of the civil parish deviates slightly to include Lower Peover in Nether Peover and not the adjacent civil parish of Peover Inferior. The population of the civil parish at the 2011 census was 415.

Lower Peover was also where George S. Patton held meetings with the senior members of the British war cabinet where they discussed plans about many military operations, most notably D-day.

== See also ==
- Listed buildings in Nether Peover
- St Oswald's Church, Lower Peover

== Notes and references ==
=== References ===
- Ordnance Survey (2004), OS Explorer Map 257: Northwich & Delamere Forest, Southampton, United Kingdom: Ordnance Survey, ISBN 0-319-23567-X
