= Listed buildings in Rudheath =

Rudheath is a village and a civil parish in Cheshire West and Chester, England. It contains two buildings that are recorded in the National Heritage List for England as designated listed buildings, both of which are listed at Grade II. This grade is the lowest of the three gradings given to listed buildings and is applied to "buildings of national importance and special interest". Running through the parish are the Trent and Mersey Canal, the River Dane, and the A530, the A556 and the A559 roads. The listed buildings comprise a farmhouse and a canal milepost.

Name and location	Photograph	Date	Notes
Brook House Farmhouse; 53.2242°N 2.4639°W	—	Late 17th century	This is a brick building with slate roofs, consisting of two wings forming an L-shaped plan. The main wing is in two storeys with an attic and has three bays; the rear wing has two storeys and is in two bays. The windows are casements. The centre bay of the main wing projects forwards and forms a two-storey gabled porch.
Canal milepost 53.25199°N 2.47688°W	—	1819	A cast iron milepost consisting of a circular post carrying a curved plate inscribed with the distances to Preston Brook and Shardlow. The maker's name and the date are on the shaft.
