= Allostock =

Village in Cheshire, England

Coordinates: 53.233333°N 2.383333°W

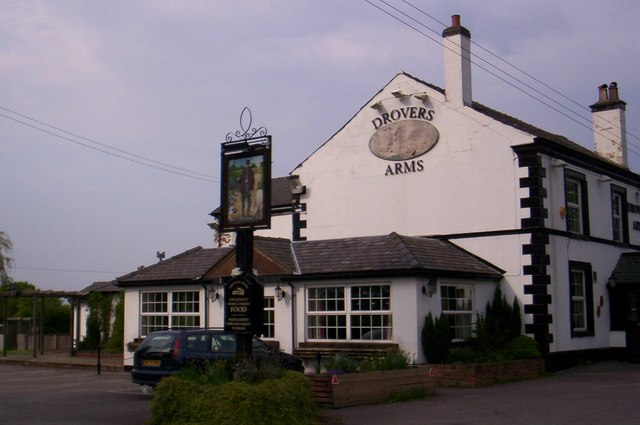
- The Drovers Arms, Allostock

- Location within Cheshire
- Population: 816 (2011 census)
- OS grid reference: SJ744708
- Unitary authority: Cheshire West and Chester
- Ceremonial county: Cheshire
- Region: North West
- Country: England
- Sovereign state: United Kingdom
- Post town: Knutsford
- Postcode district: WA16
- Police: Cheshire
- Fire: Cheshire
- Ambulance: North West

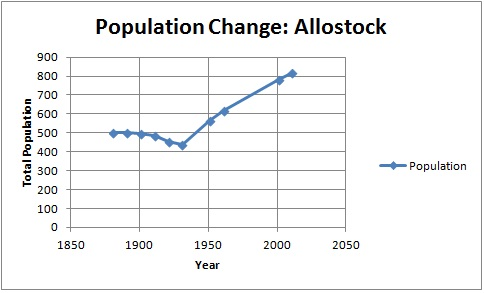
Total Population Graph 1881-2011

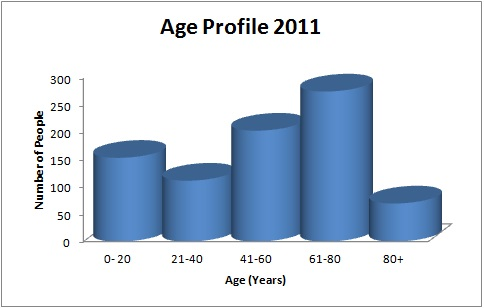
Graph Allostock Age Profile 2011

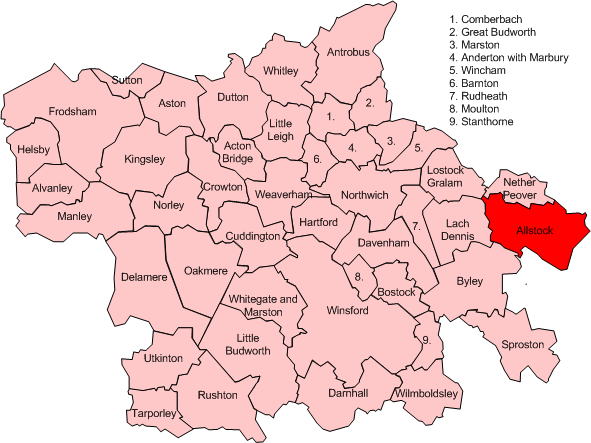
Map of Allostock civil parish within the former borough of Vale Royal

Allostock is a village and civil parish in the unitary authority of Cheshire West and Chester and the ceremonial county of Cheshire, England, about five miles south of Knutsford and 20 miles south of Manchester. Allostock was formerly in the borough of Vale Royal until it was abolished on 1 April 2009 to form Cheshire West and Chester. Allostock is located on an affluent of the river Weaver. It had a population of 816 according to the 2011 census data as well as 325 households.

John Bartholemew wrote this in 1887 about Allostock:

"Allostock, township, Great Budworth par., mid. Cheshire, 5 miles S. of Knutsford, 3017 ac., pop. 501."

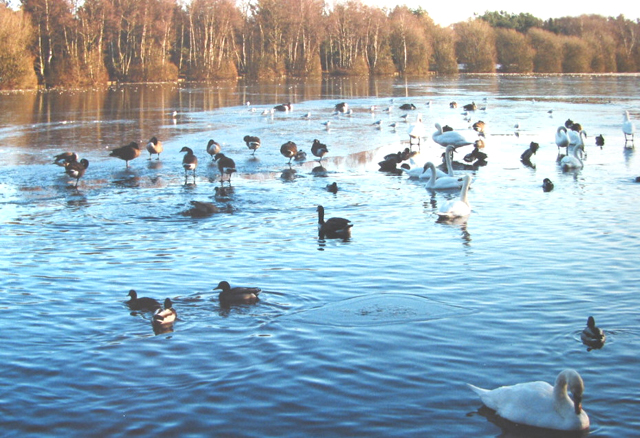
Shakerley Mere

== See also ==
- Listed buildings in Allostock
