= Listed buildings in Wincham =

Wincham is a village and a civil parish in Cheshire West and Chester, England. It contains two buildings that are recorded in the National Heritage List for England as designated listed buildings, both of which are listed at Grade II. This grade is the lowest of the three gradings given to listed buildings and is applied to "buildings of national importance and special interest". Running through the parish are the Trent and Mersey Canal, and the Wincham Brook. The parish is partly rural, and was formerly the site of salt mining. The listed buildings comprise a farmhouse and a canal milepost.

| Name and location | Photograph | Date | Notes |
|---|---|---|---|
| Home Farmhouse; 53.28175°N 2.45965°W | | Mid-17th century (probable) | This consists of two wings. The cross wing on the left is timber-framed with a slate roof. It has casement windows. The wing on the right has been modernised. It is in 1 1/2 storeys, is rendered, and has a clay tile roof. |
| Canal milepost 53.27347°N 2.48868°W | — | 1819 | A cast iron milepost consisting of a circular post carrying a curved plate inscribed with the distances to Preston Brook and Shardlow. The maker's name and the date are on the shaft. |
