= Statue of Sir John Brunner =

Statue in Winnington, Cheshire, England

Coordinates: 53.27147°N 2.52957°W

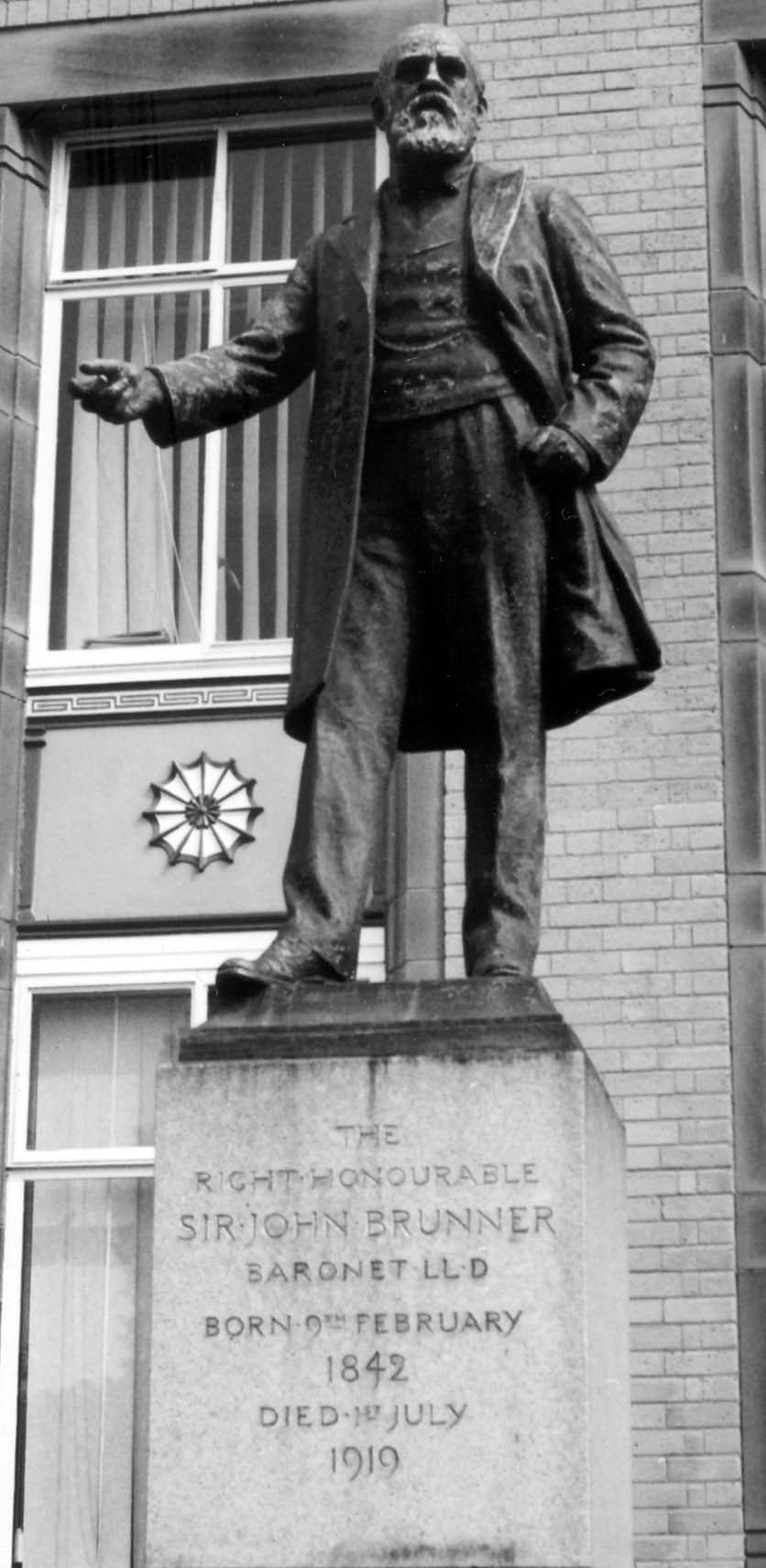
Statue of Sir John Brunner

The Statue of Sir John Brunner stands outside the entrance to Mond House in Brunner Mond Works, Winnington, Cheshire, England. Sir John Brunner was an English industrialist, politician and local benefactor. He joined the alkali manufacturing company of John Hutchinson in Widnes in 1861, eventually becoming the office manager. While working there one of its chemists, Ludwig Mond decided to leave and build a factory to produce alkali by the ammonia-soda process, and Brunner joined him as a partner. The factory was built at Winnington, and in time it became the largest producer of soda (a type of alkali) in the world. Brunner then took an interest in politics, and was elected as the Liberal Member of Parliament for Northwich, holding the seat for over 30 years. The business had made him a rich man, and he was a generous benefactor in the local area. His statue was designed by Goscombe John, and was unveiled in 1922. It was moved in 1995 to stand next to the statue of Mond in front of the offices of Brunner Mond in Winnington. The statue is recorded in the National Heritage List for England as a designated Grade II listed building.

== History ==
John Tomlinson Brunner (1842–1919) was born in Liverpool, and at the age of 15 started to work in an office in the city. In 1861 he moved to work in the office of the alkali factory of John Hutchinson in Widnes (then in Lancashire, now in Cheshire) where his older brother Henry was already working. In time John Brunner became the manager of the office. Hutchinson manufactured alkali by the Leblanc process, but this was an inefficient method for producing alkali, and was very damaging to the environment. One of the chemists working in the company was Ludwig Mond, who had been attracted to a different process for making alkali, the ammonia-soda process. By 1871 Mond had determined to build a factory to produce alkali by this process, and in this project he was joined by Brunner. In 1873 Mond and Brunner bought the Winnington estate near Northwich in Cheshire, which included the country house, Winnington Hall. The two families moved into the hall, one family occupying each wing, and the factory which became the start of Brunner Mond and Company was built nearby. (Note: Brunner Mond later became part of Tata Chemicals Europe.) By about 1892 the company had become the largest producer of soda in the world. In 1891, Brunner had become the chairman of the company, and he retained that position until April 1918, 14 months before his death.

After moving to Winnington, Brunner became interested in politics, and became a member of the Liberal Party. He was selected as candidate for the newly created parliamentary constituency of Northwich, and at the general election of 1855 he won the seat. He success was short-lived, as the Liberal Party were unable to form a stable government, and Brunner lost his seat at the general election the following year. However the successful candidate died during the following year, and at the by-election in August 1877 Brunner regained the seat. He continued to be the Member of Parliament for Northwich until he retired from the position in 1910. Brunner was regarded locally as a kind and sympathetic employer and a generous benefactor. Amongst his benefactions were a new library in Northwich, and the re-endowment of Sir John Deane's College in the town.

Following Brunner's death in 1919 a committee was formed to consider erecting a statue to his memory. His son Roscoe commissioned Goscombe John to create a design, which was accepted by the committee. The figure is in bronze and was made at the foundry of A. B. Burton in Thames Ditton. The stonework was made by Messrs. Kirkpatrick of Manchester. The statue was erected between the Brunner-Mond factories of Winnington and Willerscote, on a site near to the statue of Ludwig Mond. It was unveiled on 10 June 1922 in the presence of Brunner's sons, John and Roscoe, and his wife, together with Alfred Mond, son of Ludwig, Lord Leverhulme, and Louis Solvay. (Note: Louis Solvay was a relative of Ernest Solvay who developed the ammonia-soda process.) In 1995 the statue was moved to its present position outside Mond House, the headquarters of the company founded by Brunner and Mond. It was unveiled here by the Duchess of Kent, Brunner's great granddaughter. It stands next to the statue of Mond.

== Description ==
The statue consists of a bronze figure on a pedestal of Shap granite. The figure is about 1.8 metres (6 ft) high, standing on a pedestal about 2.2 metres (7 ft) in height. The figure is life size, depicting Brunner standing, with a beard, wearing a morning coat, his left thumb in his trouser pocket, and his right arm outstretched. His stance is "the attitude he was wont to assume when addressing a public meeting". The pedestal contains an inscription reading as follows:

THE RIGHT HONOURABLE SIR JOHN BRUNNER, BART., LL.D.
BORN, FEBRUARY 9TH, 1842, DIED 1ST JULY 1919

On the base of the pedestal are the names of the manufacturer of the figure, and of the sculptor.

== Appraisal ==
The statue was designated as a Grade II listed building on 19 August 1986. Grade II is the lowest of the three grades of listing and is applied to "buildings of national importance and special interest". Shortly after the statue's unveiling an article in the local press said that it "is a fine piece of creative sculpture", praising its "vigour and energy" and expressing the opinion that "it will form a fitting companion monument to the late Dr. Mond". Hartwell et al. comment in the Buildings of England series that Brunner's statue is "much more forthcoming" than that of Mond.

== See also ==
- Listed buildings in Northwich

== Notes and references ==
Notes

Citations

Sources

- Hardie, D. W. F. (1950), A History of the Chemical Industry of Widnes, London: Imperial Chemical Industries, OCLC 7503517
- Hartwell, Clare; Hyde, Matthew; Hubbard, Edward; Pevsner, Nikolaus (2011) [1971], Cheshire, The Buildings of England, New Haven and London: Yale University Press, ISBN 978-0-300-17043-6
- Koss, Stephen E. (1970), Sir John Brunner: Radical Plutocrat 1842–1919, Cambridge University Press, ISBN 0-521-07906-3
- Morris, Edward; Roberts, Emma (2012), Public Sculpture of Cheshire and Merseyside (excluding Liverpool), Public Sculpture of Britain, vol. 15, Liverpool: Liverpool University Press, ISBN 978-1-84631-492-6
- Cheshire West and Chester, History of Northwich Library
- Historic England, "Statue of Sir John Brunner in front of Research Lab., Winnington Works (1161131)", National Heritage List for England
- Historic England, Listed Buildings
- Sir John Deane's College, The College
- Tata Chemicals Europe, History
