= Statue of Ludwig Mond =

Coordinates: 53.26983°N 2.53242°W

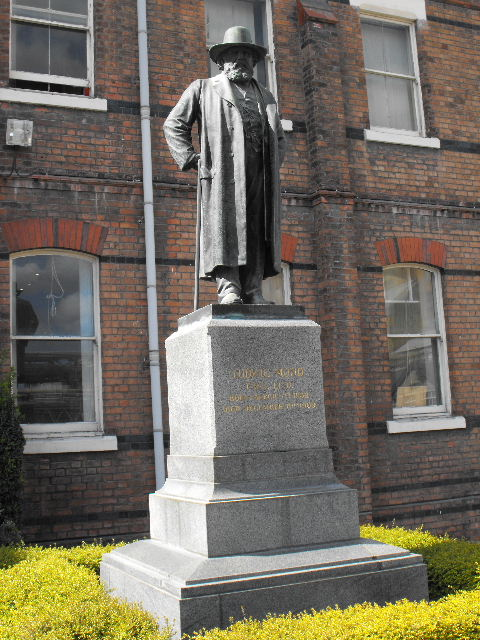
Statue of Ludwig Mond

The Statue of Ludwig Mond stands outside the entrance to Mond House in Brunner Mond Works, Winnington, Cheshire, England. Ludwig Mond was born in Germany but spent most of his working life in England. He moved to England in 1862 and joined the business of John Hutchinson in Widnes. Wishing to develop a better process for the production of alkali than the Leblanc process, he joined in partnership with John Brunner, who also worked for Hutchinson, to improve the ammonia-soda process, building a factory for this purpose at Winnington. In time the factory became the largest producer of soda (a type of alkali) in the world. Mond went on to work with other chemical processes, especially those involving nickel. He also became an art collector, bequeathing much of his collection to the nation. His statue was designed by Édouard Lantéri, and was unveiled by Brunner in 1913. It was moved in 1995 to stand next to the statue of Brunner in front of the offices of Brunner Mond in Winnington. The statue is recorded in the National Heritage List for England as a designated Grade II listed building.

== History ==
Ludwig Mond (1839–1909), who was born in Germany, became a chemical industrialist in England. He studied at the Universities of Marburg and Heidelberg and moved to England in 1862. He joined the alkali manufacturing business of John Hutchinson in Widnes (then in Lancashire, now in Cheshire). Hutchinson manufactured alkali by the Leblanc process, and Mond's earlier work for the company was to devise a method of recovering sulphur from the by-products of the process. Another employee of Hutchinson was John Brunner, who had joined the company in 1861, and who became the manager of the office.

The Leblanc process was an inefficient method for producing alkali, and was very damaging to the environment, so alternative processes were sought. The ammonia-soda process was an alternative process that promised to have advantages over the Leblanc process. By 1871 Mond had determined to build a factory to produce alkali by this process, and in this project he was joined by Brunner. In 1873 Mond and Brunner bought the Winnington estate near Northwich in Cheshire, which included the country house, Winnington Hall. The two families moved into the hall, one family occupying each wing, and the factory which became the start of Brunner Mond and Company was built nearby. (Note: Brunner Mond later became part of Tata Chemicals Europe.) By about 1892 the company had become the largest producer of soda in the world.

Mond's interests then moved on to work with nickel, and he formed the Mond Nickel Company. He took out many patents and founded the Davy-Faraday Research Laboratory at the Royal Institution. Away from industry, he formed a large art collection, and bequeathed most of it to the National Gallery. Mond is regarded as "one of the greatest experiential chemists of his generation".

After Mond's death the directors of Brunner Mond and Company commissioned Édouard Lantéri to design a statue. Lantéri had previously designed a small bronze plaque of Mond. The decision to commission Lantéri to design the statue was probably influenced by Robert Mond, Ludwig's eldest son. The figure of Mond was made in the foundry of A. B. Burton in Thames Ditton. The statue was unveiled on 13 September 1913 by John Brunner in Winnington Park, in a position overlooking their works. In 1995 the statue was moved to its present position outside Mond House, the headquarters of the company founded by Brunner and Mond, and was unveiled here by the Duchess of Kent. (Note: The Duchess of Kent is the great granddaughter of John Brunner.) It stands next to the statue of Brunner.

== Description ==
The statue consists of a bronze figure on a granite pedestal. The figure is 2.1 metres (7 ft) high, standing on a pedestal 1.9 metres (6 ft) in height. The figure is life size, and depicts Mond standing, with a beard and a moustache, holding a stick in his right hand, and papers behind his back in his left hand. He is wearing a long heavy overcoat and a large floppy hat. The pedestal contains an inscription reading as follows:

LUDWIG MOND
FRS LLD
BORN MARCH 7TH 1839
DIED DECEMBER 11TH 1909

On the base of the pedestal are the names of the manufacturer of the figure, and of the sculptor.

== Appraisal ==
The statue was designated as a Grade II listed building on 19 August 1986. Grade II is the lowest of the three grades of listing and is applied to "buildings of national importance and special interest". The description in the National Heritage List for England states that the figure is "formidable but withdrawn, an unusually explicit and powerful interpretation of character". Following its unveiling, an article in the local press commented that it represented Mond "in characteristic attitude and dress and is a remarkably good likeness".

== Reproductions ==
The statue was reproduced in an edition of bronze statuettes about 36 centimetres (14 in) high. There is a full-size copy of the statue outside the former works of the Mond Nickel Company (later Inco Europe) in Swansea.

== See also ==
- Listed buildings in Northwich

== Notes and references ==
Notes

Citations

Sources

- Hardie, D. W. F. (1950), A History of the Chemical Industry of Widnes, London: Imperial Chemical Industries, OCLC 7503517
- Koss, Stephen E. (1970), Sir John Brunner: Radical Plutocrat 1842–1919, Cambridge University Press, ISBN 0-521-07906-3
- Morris, Edward; Roberts, Emma (2012), Public Sculpture of Cheshire and Merseyside (excluding Liverpool), Public Sculpture of Britain, vol. 15, Liverpool: Liverpool University Press, ISBN 978-1-84631-492-6
- Historic England, "Statue of Ludwig Mond in front of Research Lab., Winnington Works (1139114)", National Heritage List for England
- Historic England, Listed Buildings
- National Recording Project, Statue of Sir Ludwig Mond, archived from the original on 1 February 2014
- Tata Chemicals Europe, History
