= Hartford Manor =

Former country house in Cheshire, England

Coordinates: 53.24819°N 2.53077°W

Hartford Manor

Hartford Manor is a former country house in the village of Hartford, Cheshire, England. Its age is uncertain; it was said to have been re-fronted in about 1820 for John Marshall, but the core of the building is earlier. It has since been altered and extended. During the 20th century the building was used an office. It one time it was used by North West Gas; as of 2011 it is the office of Holidaybreak. The house is constructed in yellow ashlar stone, and it has a hipped slated roof. Its front is symmetrical with two storeys and five bays. The central bay is slightly bowed, and contains a portico with two Doric columns and a flat entablature. It is recorded in the National Heritage List for England as a designated Grade II listed building. It was now used for office accommodation. before being sold for use as a school for members of the Plymouth Brethren Christian Church.

== The Marshall family ==
The Marshall family made substantial alterations and additions to Hartford Manor in the late 18th and early 19th Centuries. At this time it was called Hartford Green Bank Manor. Thomas Marshall (1735–1797) bought the Estate in 1774. He was a very prosperous salt merchant from Northwich who had amassed a considerable fortune. Soon after they added a new wing to the house so that they could entertain. He also owned Estates in Rudheath, Witton and Leftwich. After he died in 1797 his son John Marshall (1765–1833) inherited the house. With his brother Thomas he continued to develop their business until it became the leading salt trading company in Cheshire. John Marshall was born in 1765 and was educated at Witton Grammar School. He and his brother Thomas developed a love of learning and stocked their library shelves with books on literature, science, history, farming, and the law. In 1820 John added to the front part of the house leaving the older core.

John died in 1833 and Hartford Manor remained in the Marshall family and was occasionally rented out. In the 1840s it was the residence of Lady Amelia Kaye who was the widow of Sir John Lister Kaye. In about 1850 it was made available to Thomas Legard, the brother of Agnes Phoebe Marshall who had inherited the house within the Marshall family. Thomas Legard was Surveyor General for the Duchy of Lancaster. He and Agnes were the children of Digby Legard of Walton Abbey.

== The de Trafford family ==
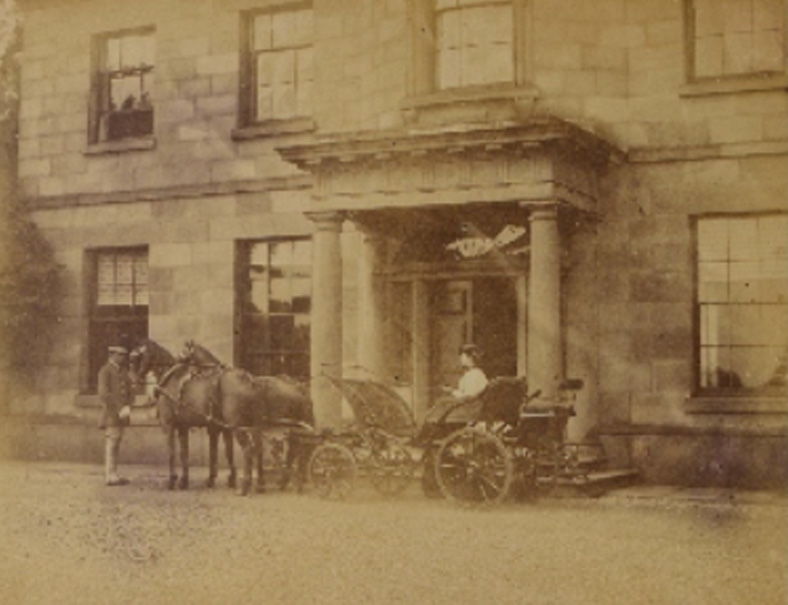
Hartford Manor in about 1870. Photo taken by Belinda de Trafford.

Between 1855 and 1878 two bachelor sons of Sir Thomas Joseph de Trafford of Trafford Park lived at Hartford Manor. They were Charles Cecil de Trafford and his younger brother Augustus Henry de Trafford. Their sister Belinda de Trafford also stayed with them occasionally. In about 1870 Belinda took a photo of the front of the house which is shown.

Charles Cecil de Trafford was born in 1823. He became a barrister in 1847 and later became a landowner. He enjoyed hunting and was frequently on the Cheshire hunting fields. He died in 1878 at Hartford Manor at the age of 56. Augustus Henry de Trafford was born in 1823. He was privately educated and joined the army obtaining a commission in the 1st Dragoons. He lived with his brother Charles at Hartford Manor for many years but in 1876 at the age of 53 he married Gertrude Mary Walmesley. He then left the Manor and lived at Rugby. In 1885 he bought Haselour Hall and lived there until his death in 1895. He had a very large family – seven sons and four daughters.

Belinda de Trafford was born in 1816. She was known to give generous donations to Churches. She was a talented artist and some of her illustrations were recently on sale. She died in 1900 at the age of 84 and her funeral which conducted by the Bishop of Salford was widely reported in the newspapers.

== The Milner family ==
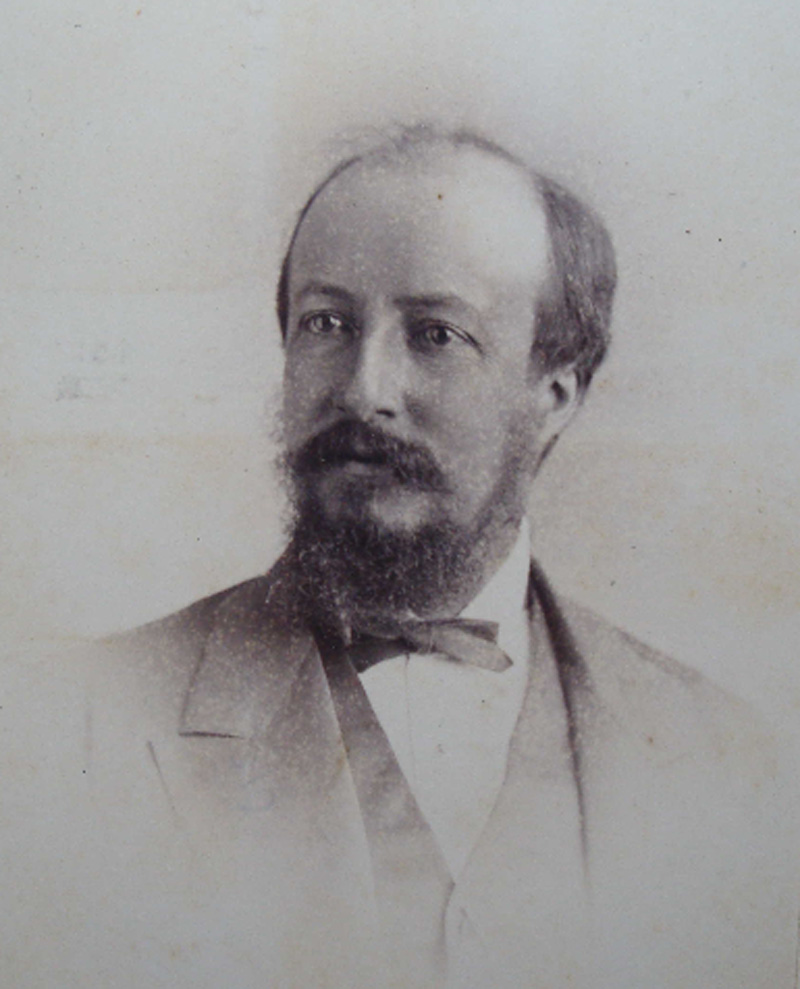
Edward Milner in about 1870.

Edward Milner and his family lived in Hartford Manor between about 1886 and 1920. Edward Milner was born in 1837 in Grappenhall. He was educated at Bootham School in York. He was a county councillor for Cheshire and became the Managing Directory of Brunner Mond and Co which was a large chemical manufacturing firm. In 1886 he married Rosa Louise Stromeyer and shortly after they moved into Hartford Manor. They had four sons who were born and raised at the house. A photo of them is shown.

Edward died in 1902 and Rosa continued to live at Hartford Manor. During the war she helped raise money and assisted with clothing for Belgian refugees. She left the house in about 1920 and the estate was divided into lots and sold.

== See also ==
- Listed buildings in Northwich
