= Dock Road Edwardian Pumping Station =

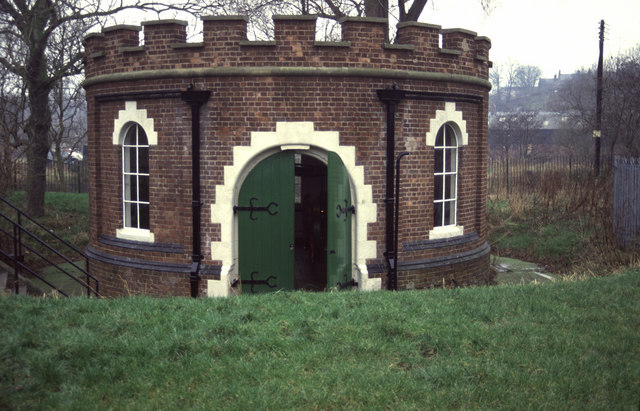
- Dock Road Pumping Station
- Interactive map of the Dock Road Edwardian Pumping Station area

General information
- Type: Pumping Station
- Location: Northwich, Cheshire, England
- Coordinates: 53.2548°N 2.5157°W
- Completed: 1913
- Owner: United Utilities

Dock Road Edwardian Pumping Station is a sewage pumping station in Northwich, Cheshire, United Kingdom. The pumping station is recorded in the National Heritage List for England as a designated Grade II listed building.

== History ==
Towards the end of the 19th century, Brunner Mond chemical company was provided new housing for their employees and Northwich sewage facilities were not adequate. The first sewers were laid in the town and discharged into the River Weaver, causing widespread pollution and providing no defence against disease. The Wallerscote Sewage Works was opened in 1902, and was successful in improving the conditions within the area it served. However, there were large parts of the town that was too low-lying for sewage to flow to Wallerscote.

To solve the problem, Northwich Urban District Council built the pumping station next to the River Weaver at Dock Road in 1913. The station intercepted sewage before it entered the river and pumped it across the river to the top of Castle Hill and onwards to the Wallerscote Works.

The pumping station was in use for over 60 years and is now maintained by United Utilities as a monument that is open to the public.

== Equipment ==
The station was equipped with two single-cylinder Crossley 'N'-type gas-fired engines and two Haywood Tyler triplex lift and force pumps, capable of pumping 9,600 gallons per hour. In the 1970s, a new station containing electric pumps capable of pumping 36,000 gallons per hour was built alongside the Edwardian building but the original engines and pumps have now been restored.

== See also ==
- Listed buildings in Northwich
