= Holy Trinity Church, Northwich =

Coordinates: 53.2577°N 2.5188°W

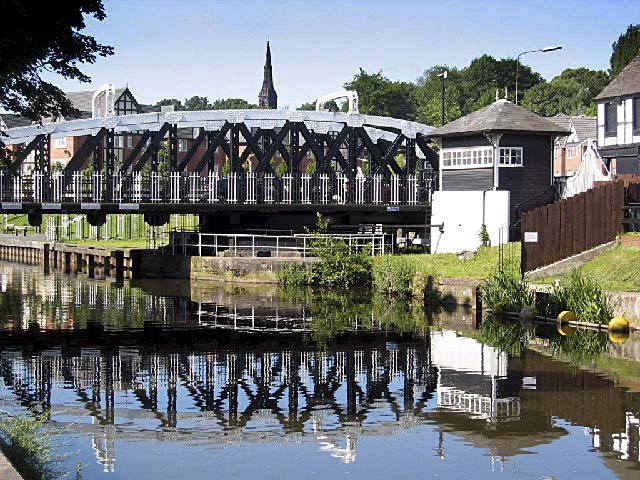
- The spire of Holy Trinity Church from Town Bridge

- Location in Cheshire
- OS grid reference: SJ 655 735
- Location: Northwich, Cheshire
- Country: England
- Denomination: Anglican
- Website: Holy Trinity, Northwich

History
- Status: Parish church
- Founded: 1 July 1841
- Founder: Weaver Navigation Trustees
- Consecrated: 1 July 1842

Architecture
- Functional status: Active
- Heritage designation: Grade II
- Designated: 19 August 1986
- Architect: Edmund Sharpe
- Architectural type: Church
- Style: Gothic Revival
- Groundbreaking: 1841
- Completed: 1842

Administration
- Province: York
- Diocese: Chester
- Archdeaconry: Chester
- Deanery: Middlewich

Clergy
- Vicar: In Vacancy (May 2024)

Holy Trinity Church, Northwich, (also known as Holy Trinity Church, Castle) is in the Castle district of Northwich, Cheshire, England. It is an active Anglican parish church in the deanery of Middlewich, the archdeaconry of Chester, and the diocese of Chester. Its benefice was united with that of St Luke, Winnington, Northwich until 2018 when the benefice was dissolved and Holy Trinity became a single parish again. The church is recorded in the National Heritage List for England as a designated Grade II listed building.

== History ==
From 1720 improvements were made to the River Weaver to make it more navigable for transport from the salt mines in the Winsford area of Cheshire to the River Mersey, creating the Weaver Navigation. In 1839 the Weaver Navigation Trustees received a petition from its employees to allow them "the privilege of resting on the Sabbath day" and to "have an opportunity of attending Divine Service". Previous Acts of Parliament had already prohibited bargemen from having to work on Sundays. On 12 August 1839 the Trustees passed a by-law forbidding traffic on the Navigation between midnight on Saturday and midnight on Sunday. On 4 August 1840 a Weaver Navigation Act was passed to authorise the Trustees to use part of their funds to build one or more churches for their employees. Holy Trinity, Northwich, was one of these churches, the others being Christ Church, Weston Point, and Christ Church, Winsford. The architect gaining the commission for all three churches was Edmund Sharpe of Lancaster.

The site chosen for the church was a small hill known as "Castle". The land was purchased for £79 (equivalent to £10,300 in 2025) from Lord Tollemache of Peckforton Castle. The foundation stone for the church was laid on 1 July 1841 by Lord Tollemache, and the church was consecrated exactly one year later. The sandstone for building the church was given by J. L. Wright, a quarry owner from Runcorn and Weston Point. When built, the church could seat about 430 people.

== Architecture ==
Holy Trinity is the largest of the three churches built for the Weaver Navigation Trustees, and had seating for over 400 people. It is constructed in red sandstone, and has grey slate roofs. The architectural style is Geometrical. The plan consists of an aisleless six-bay nave, a small narrow single-bay chancel, and a tower at the west end. The tower is slim, in three stages, and surmounted by a broach spire. In the bottom stage is a west door, the middle stage contains lancet windows, and the bell openings are traceried. The bays at the side of the church are separated by buttresses, and each bay contains a window consisting of a circle above two lancets. At the east end of the chancel are three lancet windows, with a round window above. On each side of the chancel, at the east end, is another lancet window. Inside the church is a west gallery, containing the organ, carried on a cast iron arcade. The pews, pulpit, and lectern are in painted wood and date from the building of the church. The font is octagonal. The stained glass in the west window dates from 1862. Also in the church is a window by Trena Cox, dating from the middle of the 20th century, depicting Saint Nicholas and Wenceslas. The two-manual organ was built in 1898 by Young of Manchester, and probably replaced an earlier organ.

== See also ==
- Listed buildings in Northwich
- List of architectural works by Edmund Sharpe
