= Listed buildings in Northwich =

Northwich is a civil parish and a town in Cheshire West and Chester, England. It contains 36 buildings that are recorded in the National Heritage List for England as designated listed buildings. Two of these are listed at Grade I, the highest grade, and the rest at the lowest grade, Grade II; none are listed at the middle grade, Grade II*. The River Dane joins the River Weaver and the Weaver Navigation within the parish. Also passing through the parish are the A533 road, the Trent and Mersey Canal, and a railway built by the Cheshire Lines Committee. Many of the listed buildings are associated with these features.

Listed buildings that were originally designed for domestic use but later converted for other purposes include Winnington Hall, and Hartford Manor. Buildings still in domestic use include Rose Cottage, Cassantree, and the cottages at 256–268 London Road. There are three listed churches, the Anglican churches of St Helen, together with the sundial in its churchyard, and Holy Trinity, and the Roman Catholic Church of St Wilfrid. Three swing bridges crossing the Weaver Navigation, together with their control cabins, are listed, namely the Hayhurst Bridge, the Town Bridge, and the Winnington Turn Bridge. Other structures associated with the Weaver Navigation are Hunt's Locks, and Navigation House with its former stables and a crane. Associated with the Trent and Mersey Canal is one of its mileposts. The railway viaduct built for the Cheshire Lines Committee is listed. Other listed structures include the gates and gate piers of Verdin Park, the original part of the Victoria Infirmary, and the former Plaza Cinema. In addition the statues of Ludwig Mond and Sir John Brunner, the founders of the chemical firm of Brunner Mond, standing in front of the research laboratories of Winnington Works, are listed. The extraction of salt caused subsidence in the town towards the end of the 19th century, and buildings were designed so that they could be lifted in the event of further subsidence. Some of these are listed, namely the Brunner Public Library, the R. A. O. B. Hall, and the Post Office.

== Key ==
Grade	Criteria
Grade I	Buildings of exceptional interest, sometimes considered to be internationally important.
Grade II	Buildings of national importance and special interest.

== Buildings ==
Name and location	Photograph	Date	Notes	Grade
St Helen's Church; 53.2602°N 2.5046°W		14th century	Additions were made in the 15th and 16th centuries. During the 19th century there was a series of restorations, the last in 1883–86 when Paley and Austin also widened the north aisle, added a vestry and created a baptistry. The church is constructed in sandstone. It has a west tower and a canted east end.	I
Winnington Hall; 53.2686°N 2.5336°W	—	c. 1600	This originated as a timber-framed country house. An additional stone wing was added in 1775 by Samuel Wyatt. During the 19th century it was used as a school, until in 1872 it was bought by Sir John Brunner and Ludwig Mond who each lived in a wing. After the First World War it was converted into a club for the use of the workers at the local chemical works, and has since has been made into offices.	I
Gates and gatepiers, Verdin Park; 53.25964°N 2.51765°W	—	18th century	The stone gate piers are rusticated with wrought iron finials. The gates are elaborate, and were moved from Bostock Hall Park. They are also in wrought iron, and consist of a pair of double gates and two single gates.	II
Sundial; 53.26001°N 2.50478°W	—	18th century	The sundial is in the churchyard of St Helen's Church to the south of the church. It is in red sandstone and consists of a vase baluster on a square plinth on two circular steps. It has a copper dial but no gnomon.	II
Hartford Manor; 53.2482°N 2.5308°W		Late 18th century	This stone house was refronted in about 1820. It is in two storeys with a five-bay front and a slate roof. Its central bay is slightly bowed, and contains a portico with two Doric columns and a flat entablature. The windows are sashes. It has been converted into offices.	II
Rose Cottage; 53.2658°N 2.5357°W	—	c. 1780	A cottage built for Richard Pennant, 1st Baron Penrhyn, probably for the Winnington Estate. It is constructed in brick with a slate roof. The cottage has a single storey and an attic, and a small wing on each side of the main block. The windows are casements.	II
Canal milepost 53.26648°N 2.47388°W		1819	A cast iron milepost on the west side of the Trent and Mersey Canal consisting of a circular post with a curved plate inscribed with the distances to Preston Brook and Shardlow.	II
256–268 London Road; 53.2491°N 2.5108°W	—	Early 19th century	A row of seven cottages constructed in brick with slate roofs. They have two storeys, and have recessed sash windows. Each cottage is in a single bay, other than number 268, which is double-fronted.	II
The Brockhurst; 53.2508°N 2.5081°W	—	Early 19th century	A stone building on a projecting plinth with a hipped slate roof. It has an Ionic porch with four columns and a flat entablature. The windows are sashes, with a pair of canted bow windows on the south side. It has been converted into flats.	II
Victoria Infirmary, Old Wing; 53.26164°N 2.51900°W	—	Early 19th century	This originated as a house, and was later converted into a hospital. It is constructed in ashlar stone, with a slate hipped roof. It is in two storeys, and has a symmetrical entrance front with a central doorway. There is a cross-wing to the right. The windows are sashes.	II
Weaver Navigation Office; 53.2579°N 2.5173°W	—	1826	Later the offices of British Waterways, it is constructed in brick with hipped slate roofs, and has two storeys. The entrance doorway is flanked by Tuscan columns, above which is a fanlight. The windows are sashes.	II
Clock tower 53.25801°N 2.51683°W		1830	The lower part of the tower is in brick, and the upper part in weatherboarded timber. There are clock faces on the north and south sides. On the top of the tower is an open domed cupola with a finial, carried on four Doric columns.	II
Cassantree; 53.2544°N 2.5294°W	—	1832	Located at 134 Chester Road, this is a house designed by S. W. Appleton in red brick with a pyramidal slate roof. It has a square plan plus a rear wing, and is in two storeys. The doorway is flanked by Doric three-quarter columns, above which is a fanlight. The windows are sashes, with bay windows on the side walls.	II
Road Milepost; 53.24732°N 2.51026°W	—	1833	A cast iron milepost on the east side of London Road consisting of a circular post with an ogee-domed top, and a curved plate giving distances to nearby locations.	II
Holy Trinity Church; 53.2577°N 2.5188°W	—	1842	Designed by Edmund Sharpe for the Weaver Navigation Trustees, the church is constructed in sandstone with slate roofs, and is in Geometrical style. It has a slim west tower with a broach spire. It contains a 20th-century stained glass window by Trena Cox.	II
Navigation House; 53.2562°N 2.5170°W	—	c. 1852	Built in brick with a slate roof as a residence and office for the engineer of the Weaver Navigation, it is in two storeys with cellars. The windows are a mix of sashes, casements, French windows, and a bay window.	II
Stable block to Navigation House; 53.25624°N 2.51724°W	—	1856	Built for the Weaver Navigation Trust, it is constructed in brick with a slate roof. The building is in 1 1/2 storeys and two bays. Its features include a large arched entrance, doorways, a circular pitching hole, a casement window, and a horizontally-sliding sash window.	II
Hunt's Locks; 53.2523°N 2.5175°W		c. 1860	A pair of locks in the Weaver Navigation. The smaller eastern lock was built in about 1860 and has two pairs of lock gates. The western lock followed in about 1890, is wider, and has three pairs of gates. The locks also include a pair of steel semaphore signals at each end, cast iron bollards, and Pelton turbines.	II
Weaver Railway Viaduct; 53.25453°N 2.51474°W		1862	Built for the Cheshire Lines Committee, this is a viaduct of 48 arches carrying the railway over the River Weaver, Weaver Navigation, the A533 road and the River Dane. It is constructed in sandstone and brick, with iron girders crossing the River Weaver and the Navigation. It is about 900 metres (984 yd) in length.	II
St Wilfrid's Church; 53.2621°N 2.5068°W		1864–66	A Roman Catholic church designed by Edmund Kirby, and enlarged in 1901–02. It is constructed in red brick with blue brick dressings. Its features include a slated flèche, lancet windows, and wheel windows.	II
Weir and footbridge 53.2543°N 2.5162°W		c. 1890	A weir across the River Weaver in stone and cast iron, with a footbridge. The weir has five sluices, each separated by a stone pier. The footbridge is approached by 14 steps.	II
Verdin Technical Schools and Gymnasium; 53.2523°N 2.5128°W	—	1896–97	The technical school was paid for by Sir Joseph Verdin, salt manufacturer, and designed by Joseph Cawley in Eclectic Renaissance style. It is built in red Ruabon brick with terracotta dressings and slate roofs. The building has a quadrangle plan with its main entrance at the east corner, and is mainly in two storeys, Its features include octagonal turrets, shaped gables, stained glass in some windows, and a polygonal roof and cupola over the main entrance.	II
Hayhurst Bridge and control cabin 53.2582°N 2.5164°W		1899	A swing bridge carrying the A5509 road over the Weaver Navigation. It consists of a single pivoted span with asymmetrical bowstring lattice girders. There is a pair of steel gates at each end, carried on cast iron posts. The control cabin is timber-framed and weatherboarded, with casement windows, and an ornate finial on its pointed roof.	II
Town Bridge and control cabin 53.2604°N 2.5159°W		1899	A swing bridge carrying the A533 road over the Weaver Navigation. It consists of a single pivoted span with asymmetrical bowstring lattice girders. There is a pair of steel gates at the east end carried on cast iron posts, and a barrier on the railway track at the west end. The control cabin is timber-framed and weatherboarded, with casement windows, and ornate finials on its hipped roof.	II
Winnington Turn Bridge and control cabin 53.2705°N 2.5389°W		1908–09	A swing bridge carrying the A533 road over the Weaver Navigation, replacing an earlier bridge of 1901. It is in cast steel, with a walkway, which was added later. The control cabin is constructed in brick and has a slate roof with a spear finial. It is in two storeys, and contains a band of casement windows.	II
Brunner Public Library; 53.2623°N 2.5099°W		1909	A public library and museum designed by A .E. Powles. It is a timber-framed building on a brick plinth with a slate roof. It is designed to be lifted up in the event of subsidence. It is a symmetrical building in two storeys consisting of a central block with two cross wings.	II
Dock Road Pumping Station; 53.25482°N 2.51566°W		1910	A circular single-storey brick building with stone dressings and a crenellated parapet. It has a round-arched quoined doorway, and seven round-arched windows with voussoirs. Inside are two pumps and two engines that were originally gas-powered.	II
R. A. O. B. Hall; 53.2620°N 2.5108°W		1911	Built as the Constitutional Club, and later used by the Royal Antediluvian Order of Buffaloes, it was designed by J. Cawley as a timber-framed building with a slate roof. The building can be lifted up in the event of subsidence. It is in two storeys, the lower storey having a doorway with a pair of mullioned and transomed windows. In the upper storey is a balustraded balcony beneath a jettied gable with an ornate bressumer, bargeboards and a finial. Flanking the gallery are oriel windows.	II
Statue of Ludwig Mond; 53.26981°N 2.53243°W		1912	A bronze statue on a granite plinth of Ludwig Mond by Édouard Lantéri. It is life size, and includes a depiction of Mond's beard and moustache; he is wearing a hat with a floppy brim.	II
Post Office; 53.2622°N 2.5085°W	—	1914	A timber-framed building designed to be lifted up in the event of subsidence. It has recessed plaster panels, and a tiled roof. The building is in three storeys plus an attic. Its architectural style is Elizabethan with ornate decoration. Above the entrance is an oriel window.	II
Brunner Mond and ICI Alkali Division War Memorial; 53.26881°N 2.53389°W	—	1921	The war memorial, designed by Darcy Braddell, stands opposite Winnington Hall, and it was altered after the Second World War. It consists of a square and tapered obelisk in Portland stone, with a moulded stepped capstone, on which is a representation of an eternal flame in bronze and glass. The obelisk stands on a square four-stepped base, with a stone statue of a lion couchant at each corner. On the memorial is an inscription and the names of the workers from the companies who were lost in the World Wars.	II
Brunner Mond Lostock Gralam (Northwich) War Memorial; 53.26680°N 2.47764°W	—	1921	The war memorial, designed by Darcy Braddell, is in Portland stone, and consists of a rectangular enclosure. There is a paved area enclosed by walls 6 feet (1.8 m) high with corner piers, and in the centre is an obelisk 10 feet (3.0 m) high. The obelisk tapers on three sides, it has a cornice, and is surmounted by a Latin cross. On the front is a wreath in bronze, and inscriptions relating to both World Wars. In the flanking walls are bronze plaques with the names of those lost in the walls.	II
Statue of John Brunner; 53.26971°N 2.53240°W		1922	A bronze statue on a granite plinth of Sir John Brunner by W. Goscombe John. It is life size, showing Brunner bearded, wearing a morning coat.	II
Electric Scotch Derrick crane, and waggon rails 53.25735°N 2.51669°W		1923	The derrick crane is in a repair yard alongside the Weaver Navigation. It is in iron and steel, and is powered by electricity, originally by direct and later by alternating current. Associated with it are embedded rails and a turntable.	II
Plaza Cinema; 53.2626°N 2.5073°W		1928	Designed as a cinema by William and Segar Owen, it was later used as a bingo hall. It is constructed in brick on a steel frame. The front is rendered with decorative plasterwork, and is in Neoclassical style. In the centre is a portico, above which is a round-headed arch containing a sculpture of a film camera supported by putti. Inside is a double-height auditorium with a balcony at the rear.	II
