= St Helen Witton Church, Northwich =

Coordinates: 53.2602°N 2.5046°W

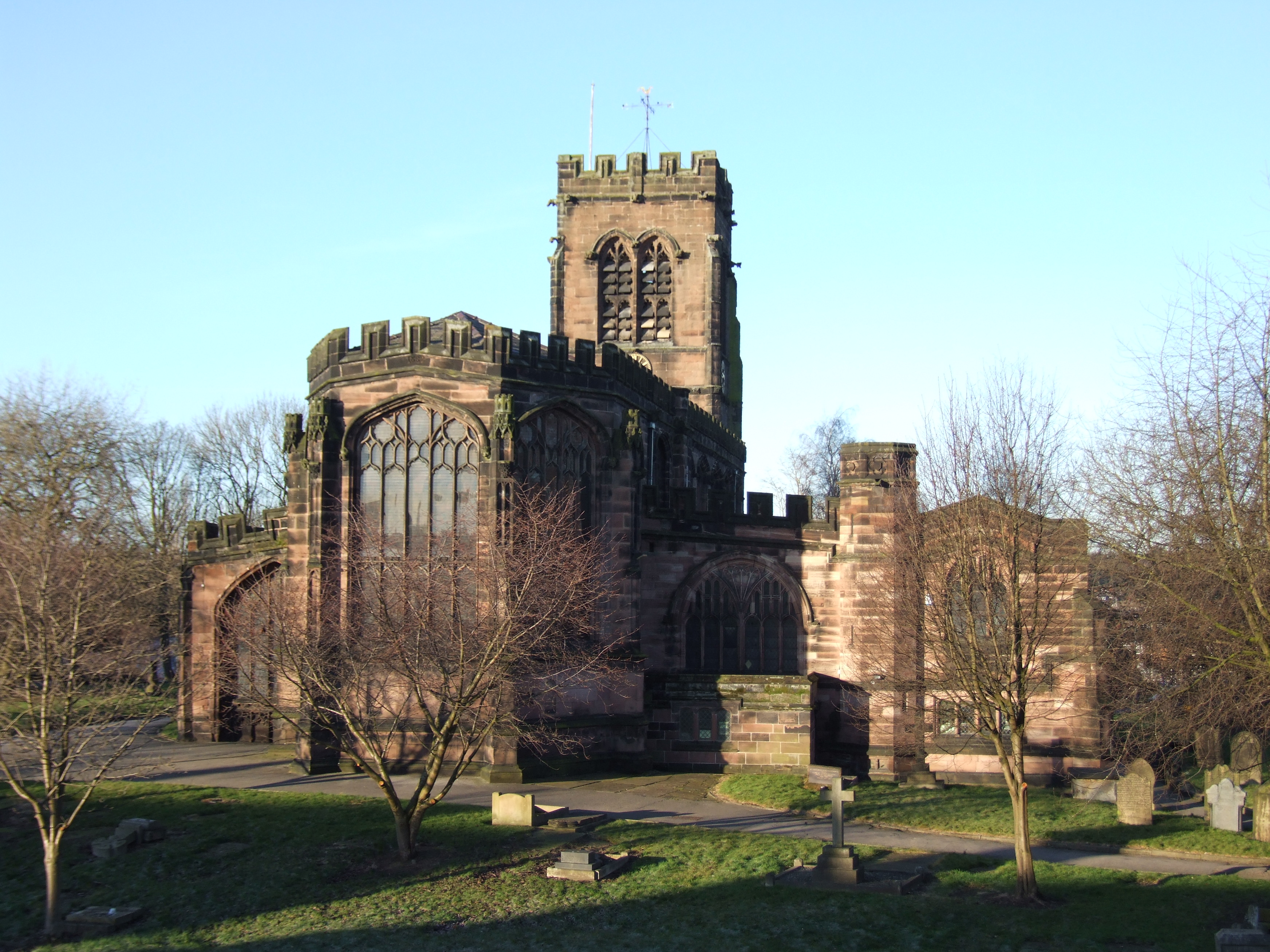
- St Helen Witton Church, Northwich, from the east

- Location in Cheshire
- OS grid reference: SJ 665 739
- Location: Northwich, Cheshire
- Country: England
- Denomination: Anglican
- Churchmanship: Central
- Website: St Helen, Witton

History
- Status: Parish church
- Dedication: Saint Helen

Architecture
- Functional status: Active
- Heritage designation: Grade I
- Designated: 24 March 1950
- Architect(s): Paley and Austin (1883–86 additions and alterations)
- Architectural type: Church
- Style: Gothic

Specifications
- Materials: Red sandstone

Administration
- Province: York
- Diocese: Chester
- Archdeaconry: Chester
- Deanery: Middlewich
- Parish: Witton, otherwise Northwich, St Helen

Clergy
- Vicar: In vacancy

St Helen Witton Church, Northwich, is in the centre of the town of Northwich, Cheshire, England. It is recorded in the National Heritage List for England as a designated Grade I listed building. The church is now known as "St Helen's, Witton" or "Northwich Parish Church". It is an active Anglican parish church in the diocese of Chester, the archdeaconry of Chester and the deanery of Middlewich. Alec Clifton-Taylor includes it in his list of 'best' English parish churches.

== History ==
The church was originally a chapel of ease to St Mary and All Saints, Great Budworth and the area was then known as Witton. The present building dates from the 14th century, with additions in the 15th, 16th and 19th centuries. A tradition that Witton had a chapel as early as the 13th century cannot be verified, but by the mid-14th century a church (technically a chapel of ease) stood on the present site. It was roughly the same length as the current building, had transepts but no aisles, side chapels or clerestory, and was covered by a steeply pitched roof rising from about the height of the present arcade. There would have been a chancel arch with a great beam or loft across it bearing a rood, but no chancel step. The only seats would have been stone benches around the walls.

Gradually this evolved into the church as it is today. North and south aisles, narrower than those currently present, were added in the 15th century. The tower was built or rebuilt in about 1498, and the name ‘Thomas Hunter’ prominently displayed on it indicates it was the work of the mason of that name who was also associated with nearby Norton Priory. A porch in roughly the same position as the current porch was added at this time, or perhaps even earlier. The present porch however is certainly no earlier than 1500 and possibly much later: an inscription on its beam commemorates a substantial repair in 1756.

The aisles were rebuilt and widened between 1536 and 1549, bringing what had been a side chapel (now the Lady Chapel) into the body of the church. The nave was later also widened, at the expense of the north aisle, and a clerestory added by 1550 at the latest. Probably at this time the present roof over the nave was installed, though there is debate as to whether it was commissioned for the church originally. Later the chancel was widened to match the nave. The chancel was embattled soon after 1624, when Thomas Farmer, the master of Witton Grammar School, left money for the purpose in his will.

In 1723, St Helen's was effectively ecclesiastically separated from its mother parish of Great Budworth, when a parochial chapelry called Witton was established with its own clergy, partly funded by Queen Anne's Bounty. The chapelry initially covered the townships of Birches, Castle Northwich, Hartford, Hulse, Lach Dennis, Lostock Gralam, Northwich, Winnington, Witton cum Twambrooks, and part of Rudheath. The chapelry was gradually reduced in area as more churches were built. The separation from Great Budworth was confirmed in 1900, when the chapelry was renamed "St Helen Witton, otherwise Northwich".

In the 18th century galleries (since removed) were gradually added on three sides of the interior, and in 1767 an organ and organ gallery also installed, possibly over the chancel. Later the organ was placed in the west gallery.

In 1841 a major restoration was undertaken which involved the re-siting of the pulpit, changes to the chancel steps, rebuilding of the south and west galleries, renovation of the roof and the making of a grand west door. (Previously the only entrances had been that via the porch to the south and a small door giving access from outside to the tower steps). Twenty years later a large crack developed in the chancel which therefore had to be taken down and rebuilt in 1861–62, and at this time the present three large coloured glass windows behind the altar were installed. Apart from the roof therefore the chancel is substantially mid-Victorian. In 1883–86 further work was carried out on the church by the Lancaster architects Paley and Austin. The north aisle, then only 8.5 feet (3 m) wide, was widened to make it correspond with the south aisle. A large northeast vestry was added, and a baptistry was created inside the church. Other work done at much the same period included the addition of an altar rail, a new pulpit and the re-flooring of the whole church.

Although there have since been further changes to the interior (including the addition of screens at the east end of the aisles and new coloured glass windows), by the 1890s the church looked much as it does today. It formally became a parish church when "the District Chapelry of St Helen Witton, otherwise Northwich", came into being on 7 August 1900.

== Architecture ==
=== Exterior ===
The church is built in red sandstone with flattish roofs concealed by parapets. The plan consists of a tower at the west end, a six-bay nave with north and south aisles, a chancel with a polygonal east apse, a vestry to the north and a south porch. The tower has four stages, is crenellated and has diagonal buttresses and a west door. Above this is a four-light window, two-light bellringers' windows on the north and south faces, an empty niche on the west face, a clock with faces to all sides and paired two-light bell openings.

=== Interior ===
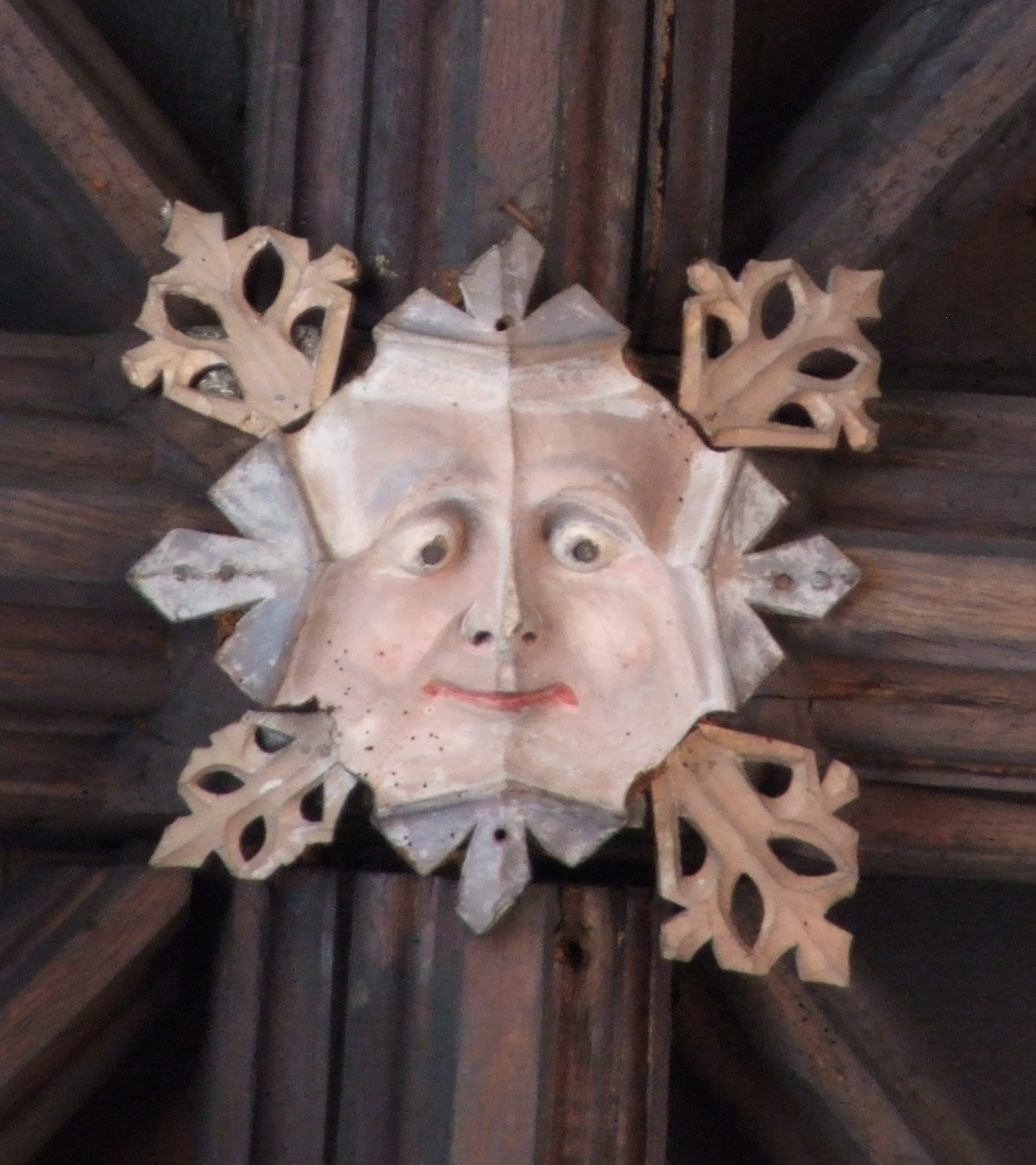
Roof boss

Over the nave and chancel is a continuous camber-beam and panel oak ceiling with diagonal cross-braces, large carved bosses at the junctions of the main beams and smaller ones at the junctions of the secondary beams. There are no memorials of distinction and most of the old fittings were discarded in the 19th-century restorations. A 17th-century altar table is still present. The three-manual organ was built between 1870 and 1880 by Young and Son and later rebuilt by Charles A. Smethurst. The clock is a double three legged gravity feed made by engineers W. H. Bailey of Salford. Taking the place of a still earlier clock mentioned in the churchwardens' accounts it was installed in 1888 and refurbished in 1911. There is a ring of eight bells cast by John Taylor and Company of Loughborough in 1911. The earliest mention of bells in the churchwardens' accounts is in 1692. Until 1877 there were six bells, two more being cast by Taylor's and added that year. All eight bells were taken down, recast and rehung in 1910, again by Taylor's. Inscriptions on the bells before they were recast showed five had been cast in 1712 and one in 1852: the inscription on the No. 5 bell at the time of the 1910 recasting read "Richard Sanders of Bromsgrove made us all six". The parish registers begin in 1561 and the churchwarden's accounts date from the 17th century.

== External features ==
In the churchyard is a red sandstone sundial with a copper dial which is listed Grade II. It was erected in 1800 by the stonemason John Moors at a cost of £10.3s.3d. The churchyard also contains the war graves of seven soldiers of World War I, and a Royal Navy sailor of World War II. An upper portion of a floriate medieval gravestone removed during 19th-century renovations lies near the south porch.

== See also ==
- Grade I listed churches in Cheshire
- Listed buildings in Northwich
- Sir John Deane's College
