= Winnington Hall =

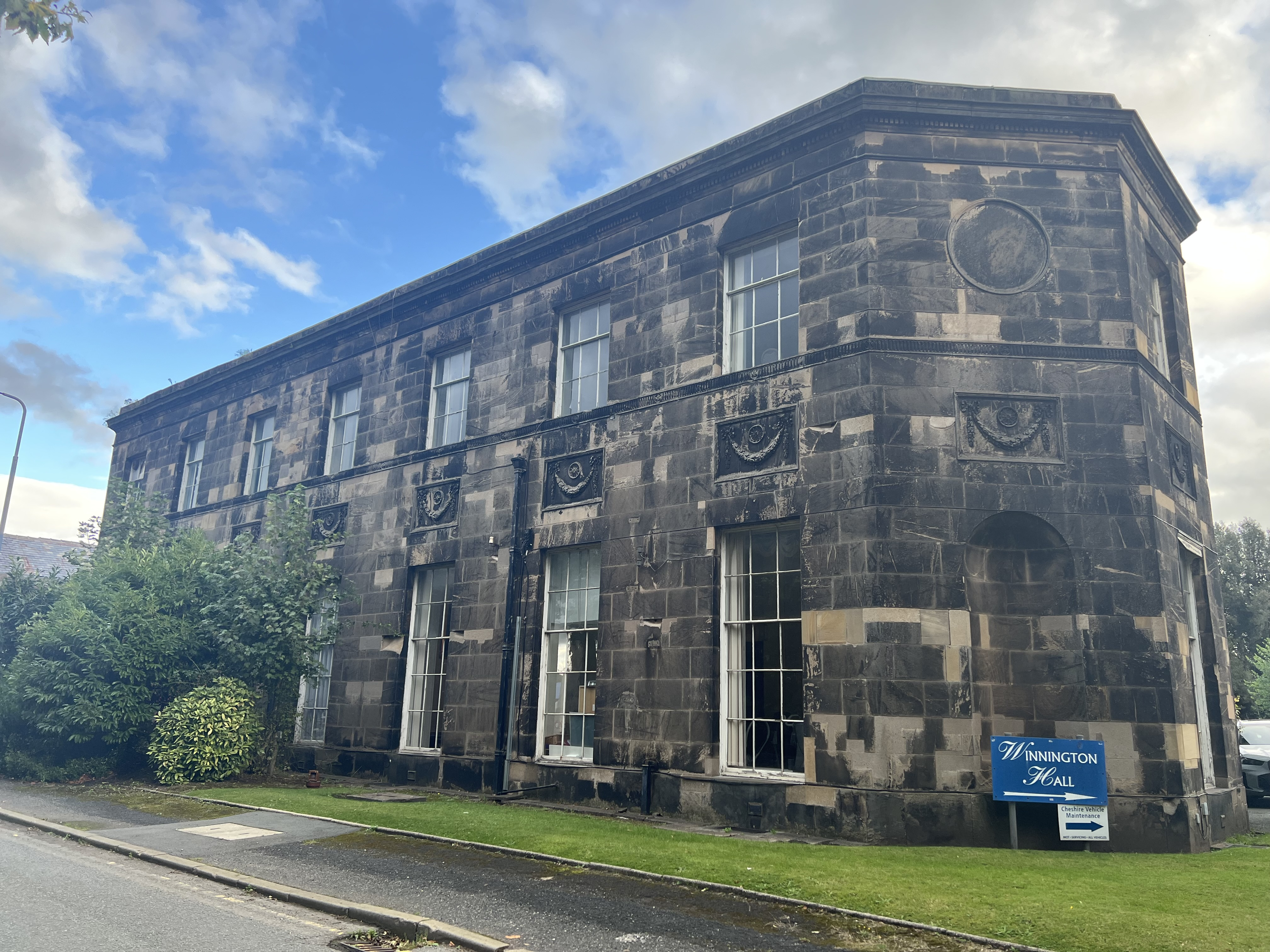

- Location in Cheshire
- 53.2686°N 2.5336°W
- Location: Winnington, Northwich, Cheshire, England
- OS grid reference: SJ 645 747

History
- Built for: Warburton family

Site notes
- Architect: Samuel Wyatt
- Restored by: Darcy Braddell

Listed Building – Grade I
- Designated: 24 March 1950
- Reference no.: 1310245

Winnington Hall is a former country house in Winnington, now a suburb of Northwich, Cheshire, England. It is recorded in the National Heritage List for England as a designated Grade I listed building. The building is in effect two houses joined, an older modest timber-framed house, and a newer, more elegant, stone house.

== History ==
=== Country house ===
The original timber-framed house was built in the late 16th or early 17th century for a member of the Warburton family of Warburton and Arley, Cheshire. Originally in three bays, it was extended by another two bays for Thomas Warburton, whose wife Anne was joint heir to the Penrhyn estate near Bangor in North Wales. A brick service wing was added to the north of the house in the early 18th century. Thomas' son, Hugh, had only one child, a daughter, Anne Susanna. In 1765 Anne Susanna married the other heir to the Penrhyn estate, Richard Pennant, who later became the 1st Baron Penrhyn. In 1775 Pennant commissioned Samuel Wyatt to design what became the larger stone extension to the house. In a possible attempt to harmonise the older part of the house with the stone extension, in the early 19th century the timber-framed wing was coated with roughcast and castellated. In 1809 the Winnington estate was sold to John Stanley, 1st Baron Stanley of Alderley. Stanley's home, Alderley Hall, had burnt down 30 years previously, and his family were living in temporary accommodation on the Alderley estate. However Stanley spent much of his time in London, and the condition of the building deteriorated. In 1817 the Stanley family moved back to Alderley where a new hall was being built. Stanley's son, Edward, moved into the house in 1842, but left for Alderley Hall in 1850 after succeeding to the barony.

=== School ===
For some years the hall was used as a girls' finishing school under Miss Margaret Alexis Bell and Miss Mary Jane Bell, where Sir Charles Hallé visited to give recitals and John Ruskin gave lectures. Ruskin helped the school financially, and had his own room in the house, which became for him a "semi-permanent residence". He instructed the 35 girls on subjects such as the Bible, geology and art, supervised their music, and watched them play cricket. (Note: Winningon was one of the earliest girls' schools to play cricket.) In 1863 Ruskin invited Edward Burne-Jones to the school, and together they devised a project to create a set of wall hangings based on characters from Chaucer's poem The Legend of Good Women. The figures were to be designed by Burne-Jones and embroidered by the girls in the school under the supervision of Georgiana, Burne-Jones' wife. Embroidery frames and wool were purchased, and work began on one of the figures. However the work proved to be too ambitious, and the project was abandoned. Later, during the 1870s, the school became bankrupt, and closed.

=== Brunner, Mond, and the chemical industry ===
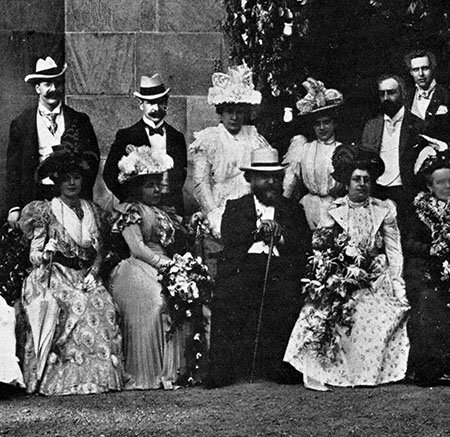
Winnington Hall in 1898. At the back Alfred Mond; Emile Schweich Mond; Constance Schweich, Edith, future wife of Robert Mond; Robert Mond and Sigismund Goetze. In front are Violet Mond; Henriette Hertz; Ludwig Mond and Frida Mond

In 1872 the estate and hall were bought by John Brunner and Ludwig Mond. In 1870 Henry Stanley, 3rd Baron Stanley of Alderley, who was short of money, had offered the estate of 600 acres (240 ha) for sale but received no bids for it. Brunner and Mond has been searching for land to build a chemical factory, and having been thwarted by Lord Delamere from buying land near his Vale Royal estate, turned to Winnington. They paid £16,108 (equivalent to £1,570,000 as of 2025), for the whole estate, including the hall and the woodland. Their initial intention had been to demolish the hall, but they then decided to live in it. In 1873 Mond and his family moved into the newer wing of the hall and later that year the Brunners moved into the older wing. The roughcast was removed from the older part, much of the timber was replaced, and the attic floor was abandoned. In all, £2,000 (equivalent to £190,000 as of 2025), was spent on repairs to the old wing. The Brunners moved out of the house in 1891 and the Monds at a later date. After the First World War the building was converted for use as the Winnington Hall Club for the use of the staff of Brunner Mond. This included adding rooms to the northeast of the older wing, and building kitchens and utility rooms to the north of the new wing. The building was restored in about 1920 by Darcy Braddell, who was responsible for much of the current internal decoration. As of 2011, the hall is divided into over 40 offices, and it is managed by a service company who provide the offices for rental.

== Architecture ==
=== Exterior ===
The ground plan of the hall remains much as it was in the early part of the 20th century. The older timber-framed hall forms a southeast wing. The stone extension lies to the northwest and is parallel, but more to the west. The two wings are linked at the southeast end of the southeast wing. The English Heritage citation refers to the older part as the "oak wing" and the newer part is the "stone wing". The oak wing provides the entrance to the building. The original timber-framed part of the wing is in two stories plus attics, with five gabled bays. It stands on a stone plinth, and its panels are filled with plaster. The exterior is decorated with close studding and chevrons. The porch dates from the 19th century, and is also timber-framed. On the left side of the wing is a projecting canted bay containing sash windows. To the right of the wing is a later addition consisting of a three-storey bay surmounted by a spire. Beyond this is a service wing "with no features of special interest". The stone wing is also in five bays and two storeys, and it rises to a greater height than the oak wing. It also stands on a plinth, and has canted ends. In the lower storey are 15-pane sash windows, and in the upper storey are nine-sash windows, with recessed panels containing festoons.

=== Interior ===
The entrance porch leads into a room known as the Stone Hall. To the left of this is a room known as the Oak Room. To the right is the Billiard Room and beyond that is a series of rooms added around end of the 19th century. A passage leads from the Stone Hall past the staircase into Wyatt's stone wing. It leads into the Gallery, at the end of which is the Orangery. Parallel to these rooms and to the northwest are the Dining Room, with an apsed anteroom leading to the Octagon Room. To the northwest of these rooms are parts of the original oak wing, and newer additions, all acting as service rooms. The Stone Hall, with its low ceiling, was re-dressed by Wyatt in Neoclassical style. It forms a contrast with the spacious nature of the Gallery, which is in four vaulted bays. Each of these bays is lit by a glazed lunette, below which are oval medallions containing a depiction of a neoclassical figure, and a niche holding a black basalt vase. The Orangery has large windows with cast iron glazing bars. The Octagon contains a Neoclassical fireplace, a delicately decorated plaster ceiling, and a frieze of winged gryphons. The Dining Room has an apsidal end. On the first floor is a suite of rooms designed by Wyatt.

== See also ==
- Grade I listed buildings in Cheshire West and Chester
- Listed buildings in Northwich
