= Northwich =

Town in Cheshire, England

- Town
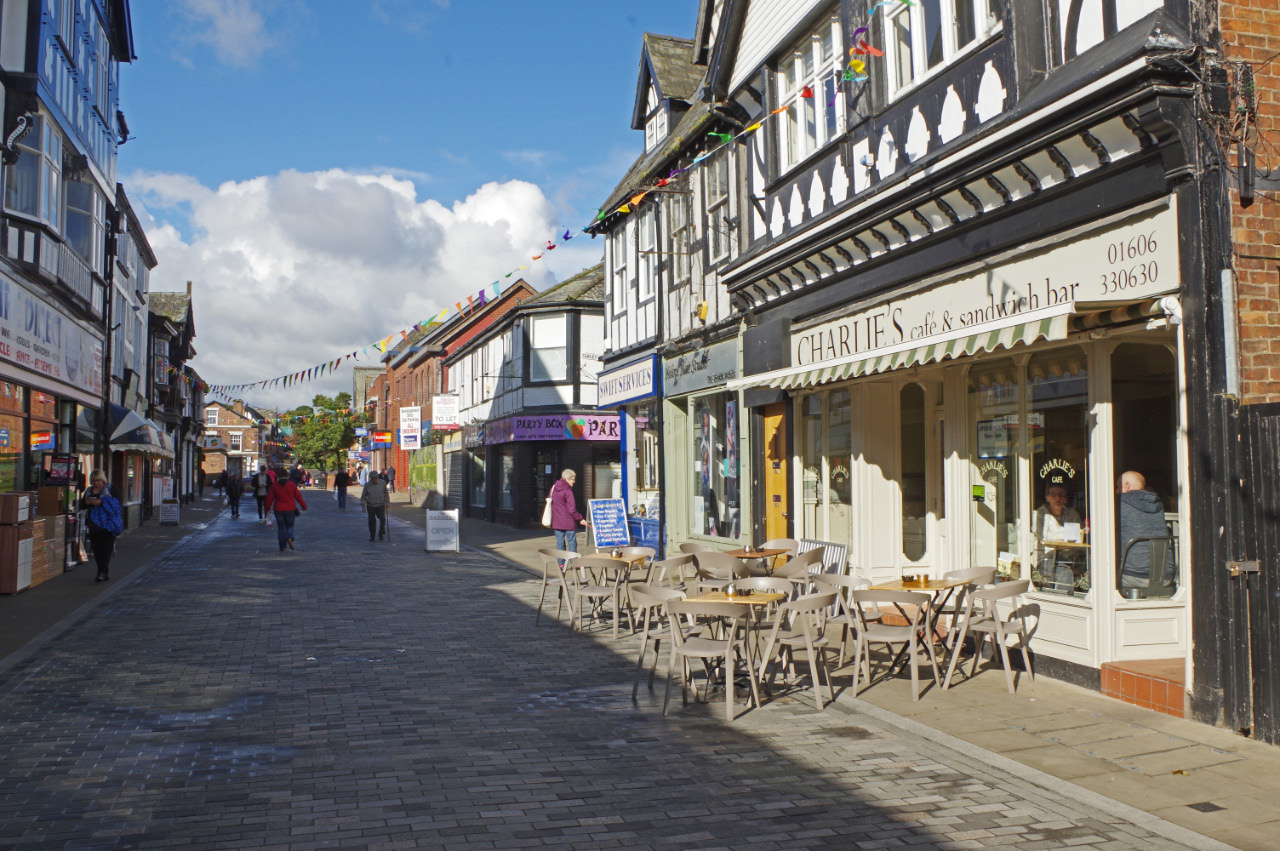
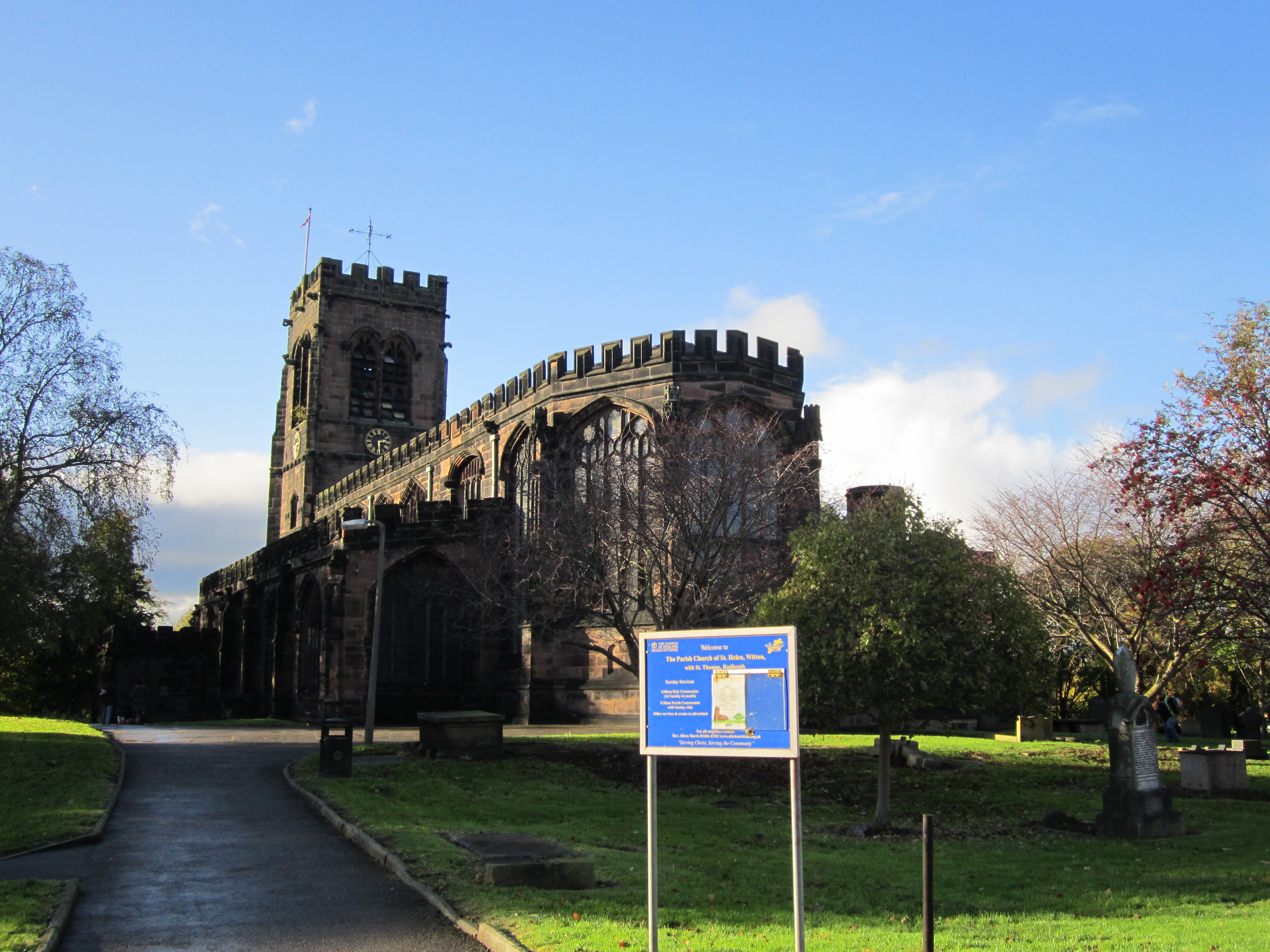
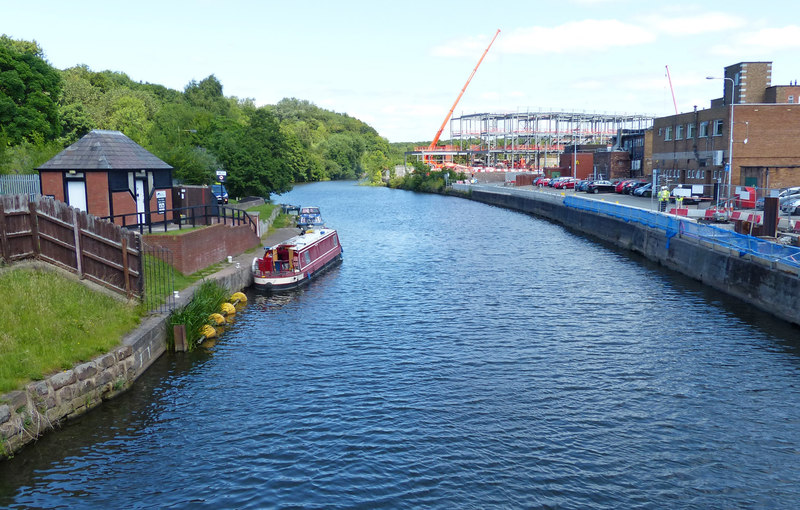
- Witton Street St Helen Witton Church Public Library Weaver Hall Museum and Workhouse River Weaver

- Location within Cheshire
- Population: 22,726 (Parish, 2021); 18,640 (Built up area, 2021)
- OS grid reference: SJ651733
- Civil parish: Northwich
- Unitary authority: Cheshire West and Chester
- Ceremonial county: Cheshire
- Region: North West
- Country: England
- Sovereign state: United Kingdom
- Villages and suburbs of the town: List: Anderton; Belmont (Ward); Barnton; Broken Cross; Castle (Ward); Davenham; Greenbank (Ward); Hartford; Hartfordbeach; Leftwich (Ward); Lostock Gralam; Lostock Green; Mere Heath; Moulton; Rudheath; Weaverham; Wincham; Winnington (Ward); Witton (Ward)
- Post town: NORTHWICH
- Postcode district: CW8, CW9
- Dialling code: 01606
- Police: Cheshire
- Fire: Cheshire
- Ambulance: North West
- UK Parliament: Mid Cheshire
- Website: northwichtowncouncil.gov.uk

Northwich is a market town and civil parish in the Cheshire West and Chester borough of Cheshire, England. It lies on the Cheshire Plain, at the confluence of the rivers Weaver and Dane, 18 miles (29 km) east of Chester, 15 miles (24 km) south of Warrington, 19 miles (31 km) south of Manchester, 69 miles (111 km) north of Birmingham and 22 miles (35 km) south-east of Liverpool. The population of the parish was 22,726 at the 2021 census.

The area around Northwich was exploited for its salt pans by the Romans, when the settlement was known as Condate. The town had been severely affected by salt mining and subsidence was historically a significant problem. Mine stabilisation work was completed in 2007.

== History ==
=== Early history ===
During Roman times, Northwich was known as Condate, thought to be a Latinisation of a Brittonic name meaning "Confluence". There are several other sites of the same name, mostly in France; in Northwich's case, it lies at the junction of the rivers Dane and Weaver.

Northwich can be identified through two contemporary Roman documents. The first of these is the Antonine Itinerary, a 3rd-century road map split into 14 sections. Two of these sections, or Itinerary, mention Condate: Route II ("the route from the Wall to the port of Rutupiae") and Route X ("the route from Glannoventa to Mediolanum"). The second document is the 7th-century Ravenna Cosmography; it refers to Condate between the entries for Salinae (now Middlewich, Cheshire) and Ratae (now Leicester, Leicestershire), at the time the capital of the Corieltauvi tribe.

The Romans' interest in the Northwich area is thought to be due to the strategic river crossing and the location of the salt brines. Salt was very important in Roman society; the Roman word salarium, linked employment, salt and soldiers, but the exact link is unclear. It is also theorised that this is the basis for the modern word salary. Another theory is that the word soldier itself comes from the Latin sal dare (to give salt). There is archaeological evidence of a Roman auxiliary fort within the area of Northwich, now known as "Castle", dated to AD 70. This, and other north-western forts, were built as the Romans moved north from their stronghold in Chester.

The association with salt continues in the etymology of Northwich. The "wich" (or "wych") suffix applies to other towns in the area: Middlewich, Nantwich and Leftwich. This is considered to have been derived from the Norse, wic for bay, and is associated with the more traditional method of obtaining salt by evaporating sea water. Therefore, a place for making salt became a wych-house; Northwich was the most northern of the -wich towns in Cheshire.

=== Medieval to early modern ===
The existence of Northwich in the early medieval period is shown by its record in the Domesday Book of 1086:

In the same Mildestuic hundred, there was a third wich called Norwich [Northwich] and it was at farm for £8.

There were the same laws and customs there as there were in the other wiches and the king and the earl similarly divided the renders.
... All the other customs in these wiches are the same.

This was waste when (Earl) Hugh received it; it is now worth 35s.

— Henry Ellis, A General Introduction to Domesday Book

The manor of Northwich belonged to the Earls of Chester until 1237, when the family line died out. Subsequently, Northwich became a royal manor and was given to a noble family to collect tolls in exchange for a set rent.

The Cheshire archers were a body of élite soldiers noted for their skills with the longbow, who fought in many engagements in Britain and France in the Middle Ages. Battles at which there were sizeable numbers of Cheshire archers include Agincourt and Crécy; many of these archers hailed from the Northwich Hundred. Richard II employed a bodyguard of these yeoman archers who came from the Macclesfield Hundred and the forest districts of Cheshire.

That salt production continued throughout the centuries and can be seen through John Leland's description of the town in 1540:

Northwich is a pratie market town but fowle,

and by the Salters houses be great stakes of smaul cloven wood,

to seethe the salt water that thei make white salt of.

— cited in Fred H. Crossley, Cheshire

Between 1642 and 1643, during the English Civil War, Northwich was fortified and garrisoned by Sir William Brereton for the Parliamentarians.

The salt beds beneath Northwich were rediscovered in the 1670s by employees of the local Smith-Barry family. The Smith-Barrys were looking for coal, but instead discovered rock salt, in the grounds of the family home, Marbury Hall (since demolished) to the north of Northwich.

=== 19th century ===
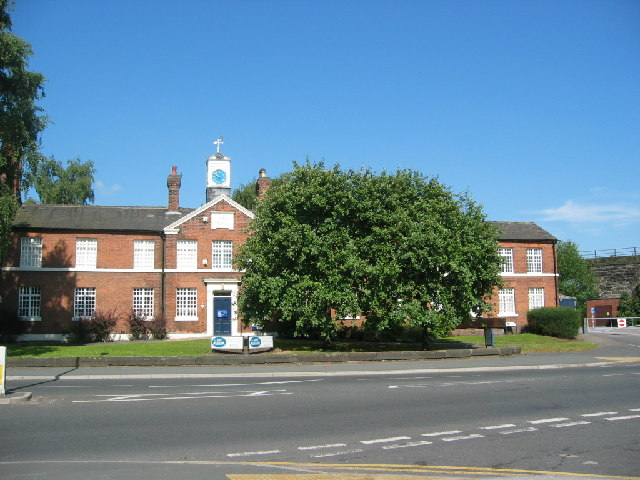
Weaver Hall Museum and Workhouse

During the 19th century, it became uneconomical to mine for the salt; instead, hot water was pumped through the mines, which dissolved the salt. The resultant brine was pumped out, from which the salt was extracted. This technique weakened the mines and led to land subsidence as they collapsed. Subsidence affected the town and the surrounding landscape. For example, collapses in 1880 formed Witton Flash as the River Weaver flowed into a huge hole caused by subsidence. Subsidence also allegedly accounts for many old timber-framed houses in the town centre, which were better able to withstand the movement of the ground. Some houses were built on a base of steel girders that could be jacked up to level the house with each change in the underlying ground. The town's historical link with the salt industry is celebrated in its the Weaver Hall Museum and Workhouse, which is now in the old workhouse.

In 1874, John Brunner and Ludwig Mond founded Brunner Mond in Winnington and started manufacturing soda ash using the Solvay ammonia-soda process. This process used salt as a main raw material. The chemical industry used the subsided land for the disposal of waste from the manufacture of soda-ash. The waste was transported through a network of cranes and rails to the produce limebeds. This was a dangerous alkaline substance and caused the landscape to be abandoned as unusable.

== Modern development ==
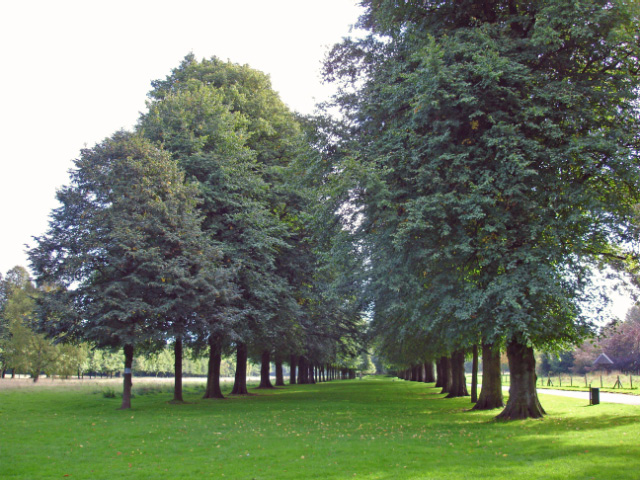
Marbury Country Park

In 1975, Marbury Country Park was the first area to be reclaimed from dereliction and has become a popular recreational area. In 1987, more land was reclaimed to form Furey Wood and over later years, Cheshire County Council's Land Regeneration Unit reclaimed what is now known as Anderton Nature Park, Witton Flash, Dairy House Meadows, Witton Mill Meadows, and Ashton's and Neumann's Flashes. The area now extends to approximately 800 acres (323 ha) of public space known as Northwich Community Woodlands.

In February 2004, a £28 million programme to stabilise the abandoned salt mines underneath Northwich began. The work was funded by the English Partnerships through its Land Stabilisation Programme, introduced to resolve issues associated with unstable mines around England.

The four mines identified for work were Baron's Quay, Witton Bank, Neumann's and Penny's Lane. These mines were chosen because their subsidence was causing problems for the town centre. The stabilisation plan involved removing millions of litres of brine from the four mines and replacing it with a mixture of pulverised fuel ash (PFA), cement and salt. The project was completed in late 2007.

The old Magistrates Court and Memorial Hall have been demolished and been replaced by Memorial Court, a £12.5 million cultural and leisure centre, which offers a pool, dance studios and a gym.

The £80 million Barons Quay Development, a retail and leisure complex, opened in 2016 and has seen the creation of more than 300,000 square feet (28,000 m^{2}) of shopping space, together with a large supermarket with a petrol filling station, cinema, restaurants, cafés, new public spaces and car parking. As of January 2023, roughly half of the retail space remains empty.

A major fire occurred at the Northwich Outdoor Market on 3 January 2020. The market's remains were quickly demolished and, so far, there are no plans to rebuild it.

== Governance ==
There are two tiers of local government covering Northwich, at civil parish (town) and unitary authority level: Northwich Town Council and Cheshire West and Chester Council. The town council is based at 78 Church Road. Cheshire West and Chester Council also has an area office at the Memorial Court building on Chester Way. For national elections, Northwich is part of the Mid Cheshire constituency.

=== Administrative history ===
At the time of the Domesday survey in 1086, Northwich was in the hundred of Middlewich. By the 14th century, it had become part of the Northwich hundred. This probably happened during the reorganisation of the hundreds in the 12th century. Northwich was described as a borough in the late 13th century, but it had no municipal charter, and borough status for the town did not endure.

The town formed part of the ancient parish of Great Budworth. The parish was subdivided into numerous townships, including a Northwich township of just 13 acres (5.3 ha) at the confluence of the rivers Weaver and Dane, corresponding to the medieval core of the town. The neighbouring townships were Castle Northwich to the south-west, Winnington to the north-west, and Witton cum Twambrooks to the east, all of which also formed part of Great Budworth parish. To the south was the township of Leftwich, which formed part of the parish of Davenham.

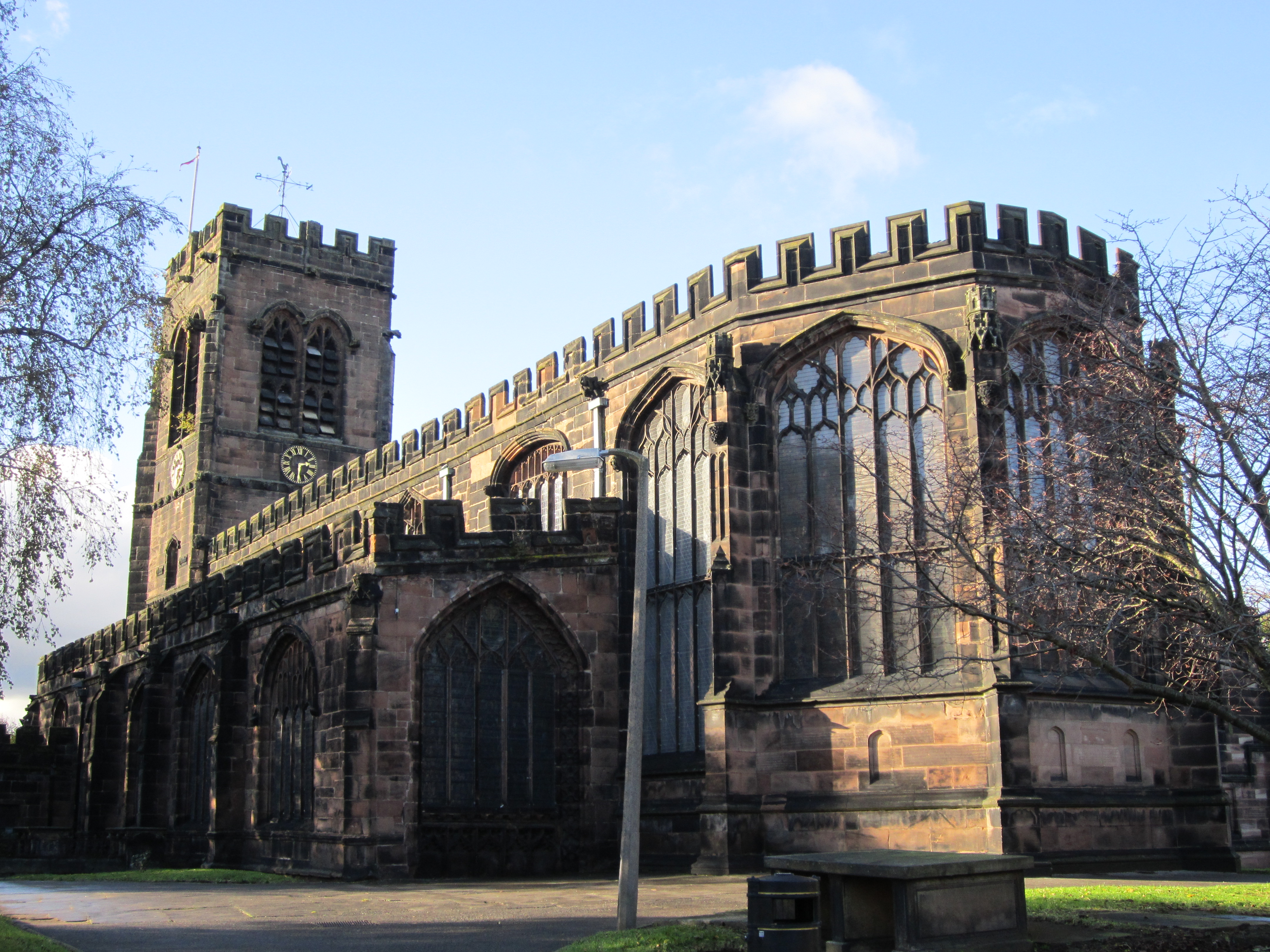
St Helen's Church

St Helen's Church was built in 14th century at Witton, to serve as a chapel of ease for the southern townships of Great Budworth parish. In 1723, St Helen's was assigned a parochial chapelry district and given its own clergy, effectively separating it from Great Budworth for most ecclesiastical purposes. The Witton chapelry initially covered the townships of Birches, Castle Northwich, Hartford, Hulse, Lach Dennis, Lostock Gralam, Northwich, Winnington, Witton cum Twambrooks and part of Rudheath. The chapelry was gradually reduced in area as more churches were built. The ecclesiastical separation from Great Budworth was confirmed in 1900, at which point the chapelry was renamed "St Helen Witton, otherwise Northwich".

From the 17th century onwards, parishes were gradually given various civil functions under the poor laws, in addition to their original ecclesiastical functions. In some cases, including Great Budworth and Davenham, the civil functions were exercised by each township separately rather than the parish as a whole. In 1866, the legal definition of 'parish' was changed to be the areas used for administering the poor laws, and so the townships also became civil parishes, which therefore diverged from the ecclesiastical parishes.

During 1863, the Northwich and Witton cum Twambrooks townships were each made local government districts, administered by separate local boards. The two districts were merged into a single Northwich district in 1875, which also took in the whole of the Castle Northwich township and parts of the townships of Hartford, Leftwich and Winnington. Such local government districts were reconstituted as urban districts under the Local Government Act 1894. Also in 1894, the parishes within the district were united into a single civil parish of Northwich matching the district.

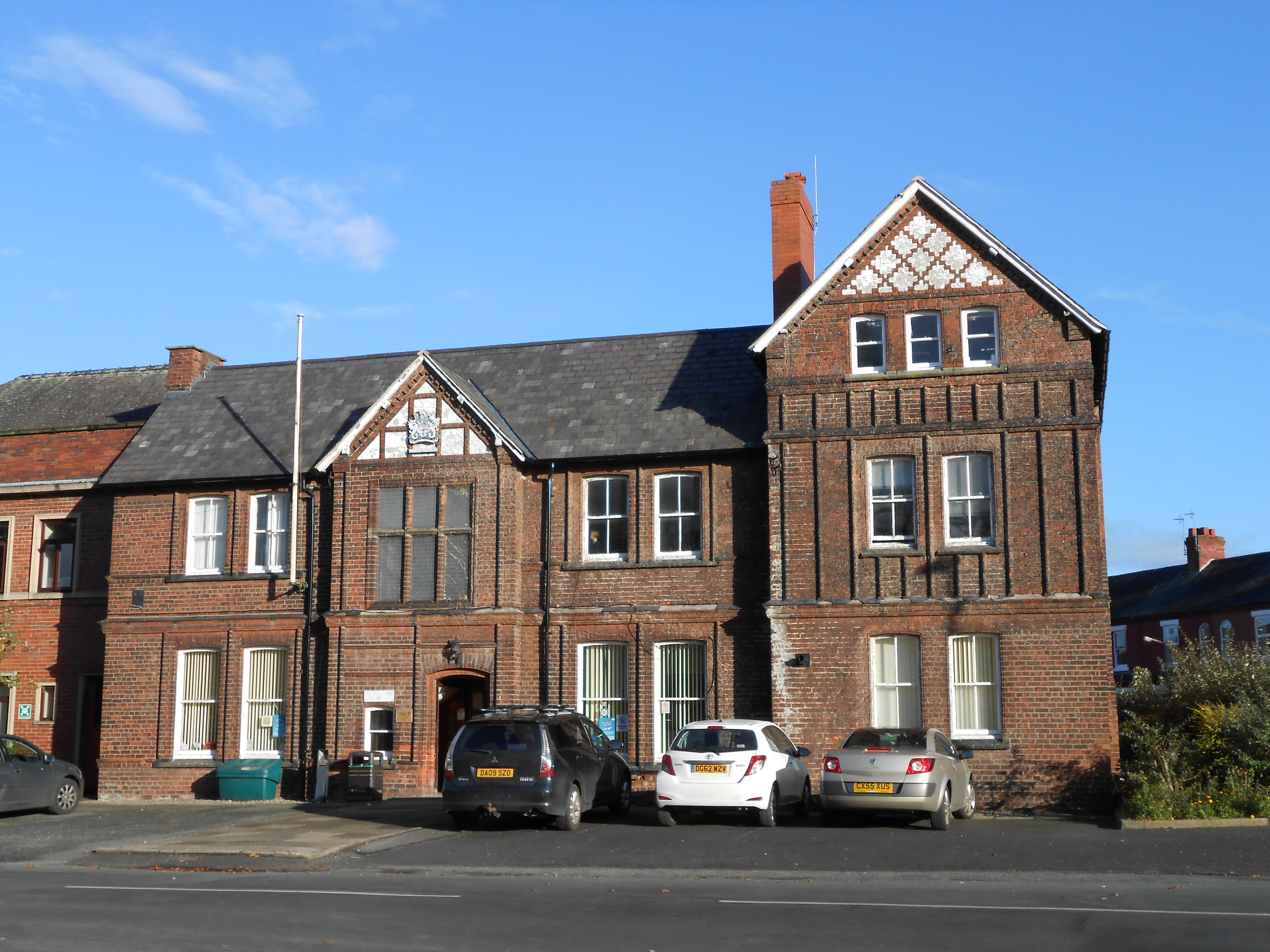
Former Council House, Church Road: Northwich Urban District Council's headquarters 1913–1974

Northwich Urban District Council took over the former Northwich Grammar School buildings (built 1878) on Church Road after the school relocated in 1908. The building was converted to become the council's offices and meeting place and renamed the Council House, opening in 1913. The urban district was enlarged in 1936 by the addition of parts of Winnington, Lostock Gralam, Barnton, Leftwich and Rudheath; then again in 1955, when parts of Davenham, Hartford, Rudheath and Whatcroft were added. The urban district council was granted a coat of arms in 1962, which features the Latin motto "Sal est Vita", meaning Salt is Life.

Northwich Urban District was abolished in 1974 under the Local Government Act 1972. The area became part of the new district (borough after 1988) of Vale Royal. A successor parish called Northwich covering the area of the former urban district was created, with its parish council taking the name Northwich Town Council. The former urban district council's coat of arms was transferred to the new town council.

In 2009, Cheshire West and Chester Council was created, taking over the functions of the borough council and Cheshire County Council, which were both abolished.

Between 1885 and 1983, Northwich gave its name to the Northwich parliamentary constituency.

== Geography ==
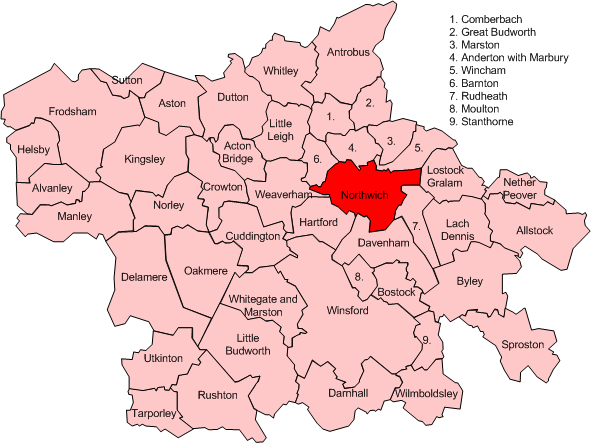
Northwich Town Council, in the former Vale Royal borough

Northwich is situated in the Cheshire Plain (Note: Location at co-ordinates: 53°15′20″N 2°31′20″W (53.255, −2.522)). The town lies between 15 and 35 metres (49 and 115 ft) above mean sea level. It is surrounded by the following civil parishes, starting due north and proceeding in a clockwise direction: Anderton with Marbury, Marston, Wincham, Lostock Gralam, Rudheath, Davenham, Hartford, Weaverham and Barnton.

Two rivers meet in the town centre: the Weaver and the Dane; the town is surrounded by undulating pasture. Subsidence and the collapse of underground saltworks has created flashes and there are also local meres; for example, to the north is Budworth Mere and to the north-east is Pick Mere.

Climate data for Winnington, Cheshire elevation: 20 m (66 ft), 1959–1976
Month	Jan	Feb	Mar	Apr	May	Jun	Jul	Aug	Sep	Oct	Nov	Dec	Year
Mean daily maximum °C (°F)	6.9 (44.4)	7.4 (45.3)	9.6 (49.3)	12.5 (54.5)	16.2 (61.2)	19.7 (67.5)	20.3 (68.5)	20.3 (68.5)	17.9 (64.2)	14.6 (58.3)	9.8 (49.6)	7.7 (45.9)	13.6 (56.4)
Daily mean °C (°F)	4.4 (39.9)	4.6 (40.3)	6.2 (43.2)	8.8 (47.8)	12.1 (53.8)	15.2 (59.4)	16.2 (61.2)	16.2 (61.2)	14.0 (57.2)	11.1 (52.0)	6.8 (44.2)	5.0 (41.0)	10.0 (50.1)
Mean daily minimum °C (°F)	1.9 (35.4)	1.9 (35.4)	2.8 (37.0)	5.0 (41.0)	8.0 (46.4)	10.7 (51.3)	12.2 (54.0)	12.1 (53.8)	10.0 (50.0)	7.7 (45.9)	3.8 (38.8)	2.3 (36.1)	6.5 (43.8)
Average precipitation mm (inches)	65.6 (2.58)	44.2 (1.74)	45.2 (1.78)	57.2 (2.25)	66.4 (2.61)	55.0 (2.17)	73.4 (2.89)	75.7 (2.98)	71.0 (2.80)	63.9 (2.52)	78.4 (3.09)	68.5 (2.70)	764.5 (30.11)
Source: CEDA

== Demographics ==
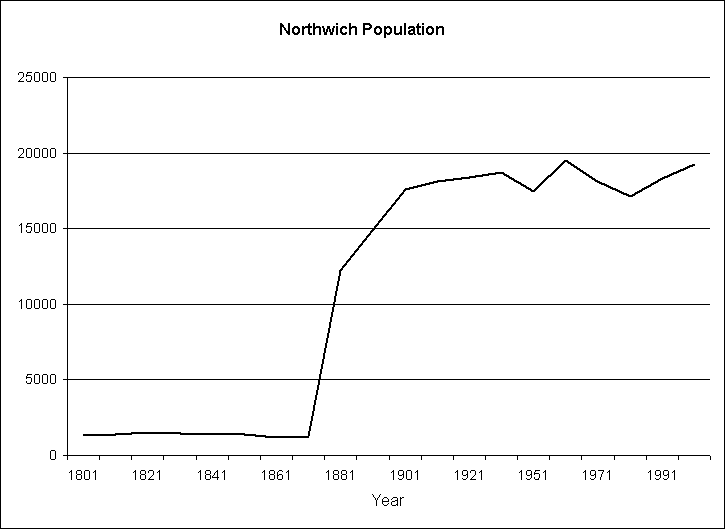
Northwich population

The Northwich urban area is defined in different ways by different authorities.

For town planning purposes, Cheshire West and Chester Council's Local Plan identifies a 'Northwich settlement area' which also includes Anderton, Barnton, Davenham, Hartford, Lostock Gralam, Lower Marston, Lower Wincham, Rudheath and Weaverham.

The Northwich Neighbourhood Plan (2018) records a population figure of 53,391 for the urban area at the 2011 census, derived from combining the populations of the parishes of Northwich, Anderton with Marbury, Barnton, Davenham, Hartford, Kingsmead, Lostock Gralam, Rudheath, Weaverham and Wincham. At the 2021 census, the same group of parishes had a combined population of 58,950.

Following the 2011 census, the Office for National Statistics (ONS) defined a Northwich built-up area with a population of 47,421, divided into two built up area subdivisions of Northwich (population 45,471) and Lostock Gralam (population 1,950).

For the 2021 census, the ONS defined a much smaller built up area for Northwich, with a population of 18,640. Areas which had been part of the Northwich built up area in 2011 have been classed as separate built up areas in 2021, including Barnton (population 6,255), Davenham (13,835) and Hartford (6,695). Weaverham, although classed as part of the Northwich settlement or urban area in the Local Plan and Neighbourhood Plan, was not included in the ONS definitions of the built up area in either 2011 or 2021.

The population of Northwich in 1664 has been estimated as 560; over the last 200 years, it has been:

Population of Northwich since 1801 (Note: The totals shown are for Northwich township (1801–1871), Northwich Local Board (1881–1891), Northwich Urban District (1901–1971) and Northwich Civil Parish (1981–2001). There were changes to the boundaries of these areas in 1873, 1936 and 1955, which affected the subsequent census figures.)

Year	Pop.	±%
1801	1,338	—
1811	1,382	+3.3%
1821	1,490	+7.8%
1831	1,481	−0.6%
1841	1,368	−7.6%
1851	1,377	+0.7%
1861	1,190	−13.6%

Year	Pop.	±%
1871	1,244	+4.5%
1881	12,256	+885.2%
1891	14,914	+21.7%
1901	17,611	+18.1%
1911	18,151	+3.1%
1921	18,381	+1.3%
1931	18,732	+1.9%

Year	Pop.	±%
1951	17,489	−6.6%
1961	19,592	+12.0%
1971	18,136	−7.4%
1981	17,098	−5.7%
1991	18,316	+7.1%
2001	19,259	+5.1%
2011	19,924	+3.5%

Source: Sources:

== Economy ==
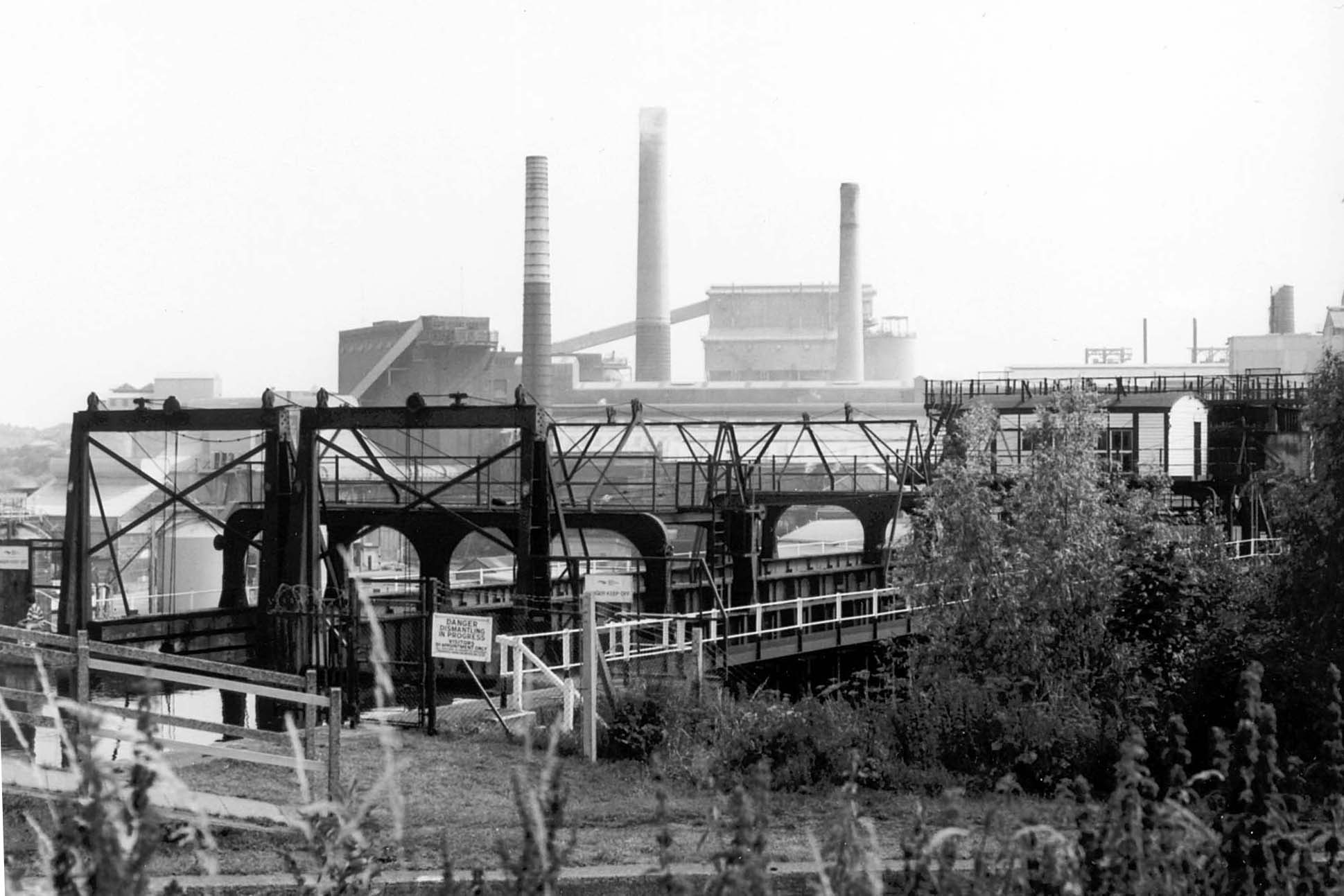
The former ICI Winnington Works seen from the Anderton Boat Lift in 1992

Northwich has been described by Leland as having a market since at least 1535, but there is no surviving charter. The town still has a market today, which is earmarked for refurbishment as part of the Northwich Vision plans.

The town's economy was dominated by the salt industry. However, a list of tolls for goods crossing over Northwich bridge in 1353 shows goods coming into the town, including a wide range of carcasses, fleeces, hides and skins, cloth, fish, alcoholic drinks, dairy products, building materials, household goods, metals and glass, and millstones. This indicates a much wider economic base to medieval Northwich than just the salt trade. Documentary evidence also exists for a mill from 1332 onwards and there is evidence for more than one mill from 1343.

Allied to the extraction of salt was a bulk chemical industry, which became concentrated at the three ICI sites at Winnington, Wallerscote and Lostock. The first industrially practical method for producing polythene was accidentally discovered at the Winnington Laboratory in 1933.

The bakers Frank Roberts & Sons have been associated with the town since 1887 and continues to be based near the town at Rudheath on the A556. Two of its three main business divisions, Roberts Bakery and The Little Treats Co, are based in Northwich; Aldred's The Bakers is in Ilkeston, Derbyshire.

There are many contemporary major employers in nearby Rudheath and Hartford.

Based on the 2001 census, Northwich had 13,928 people aged between 16 and 74; of these, 8,908 (64.0%) people were categorised as economically active; 4,268 (30.6%) were economically inactive; 455 (3.3%) were unemployed.

== Landmarks ==
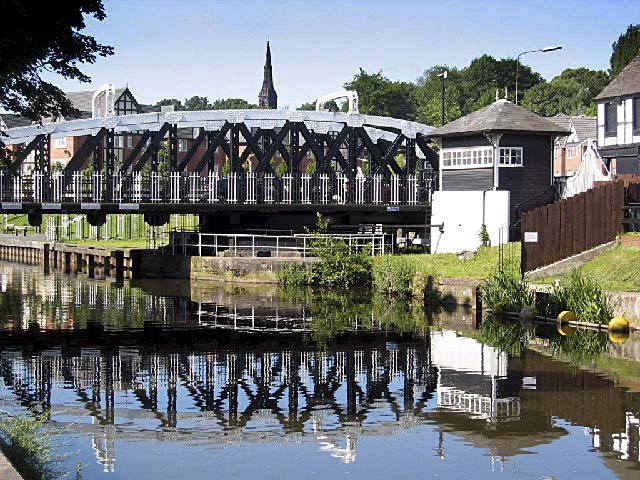
Town Bridge

Two swing bridges, Hayhurst Bridge built in 1898 and Town Bridge built in 1899, cross the Weaver at Northwich. The bridges were the first two electrically powered swing bridges in Great Britain and were built on floating pontoons to counteract the mine subsidence. They were designed by Colonel John Saner.

The Northwich Union Workhouse opened in 1837, following the Poor Law Amendment of 1834 that standardised the system of poor relief throughout Britain. The building is now the Weaver Hall Museum.

The Dock Road Edwardian Pumping Station is a Grade II listed building originally built by Northwich Urban District Council in 1913. For over 60 years, it was used for pumping sewage from parts of Northwich to the Wallerscote Treatment Works. Before it was built, untreated sewage was discharged directly into the River Weaver, causing widespread pollution.

The Floatel Northwich was moored on the Weaver near the confluence of the two rivers, but was closed when the owners, The Real Hotel Company plc, went into administration in January 2009; it has since been removed. It was the UK's only floating hotel.

== Religious sites ==
The parish church is known as St. Helen's Witton; it is a Grade I listed building. The church developed initially as a chapel of ease, associated with the parish of Great Budworth, to serve the local community, known as the Chapel of Witton. There is no known date for the creation of this chapel, but it is thought to have existed in the 13th century. None of this building exists in the current church. There is no documentary evidence to indicate the dates of the older parts of the current building; however, stones in the fabric of the porch carry inscriptions attributed to "Ricardus Alkoke Capellanus". This name matches documents concerning land in Northwich and Lostock Gralam dated 1468, but this cannot be used to date the church accurately.

The present St Wilfrid's (Roman Catholic)] church was built in 1866. The current Northwich Methodist Chapel was opened in 1990, but there has been a Methodist presence in the town at least since 1774, when John Wesley laid the foundation stone of the first chapel in the London Road area.

== Transport ==
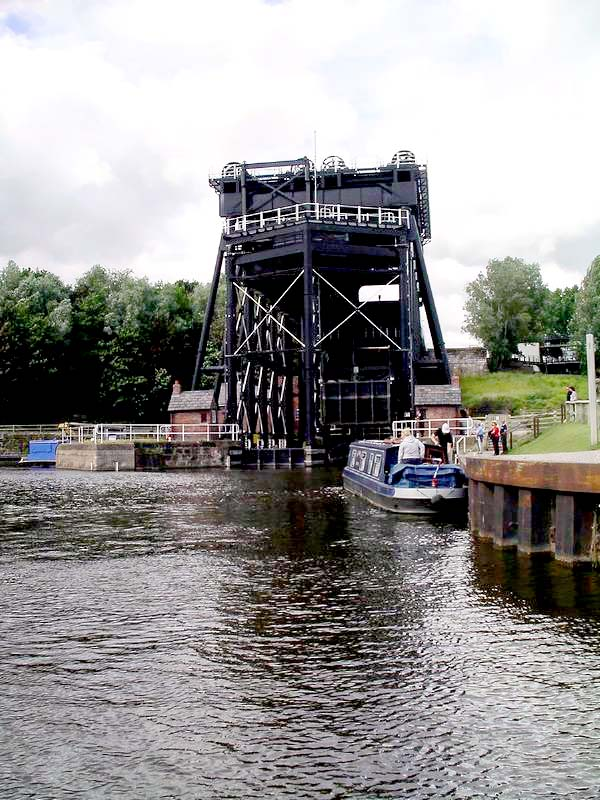
Anderton Boat Lift

=== Water ===
The key historical mode of transport was by water. By 1732, the River Weaver was improved from Frodsham Bridge to Winsford Bridge and eventually allowed vessels up to 160 tonnes (160,000 kg) to travel up to Northwich Bridge. The Trent and Mersey Canal, opened in 1775, passed to the north of Northwich because of objections from the trustees of the Weaver Navigation. However, the canal passed salt deposits near to the village of Marston and many of the later salt mines were based along its banks including the Lion Salt Works. The Anderton Boat Lift was opened in 1875 to connect the canal and river systems. It was fully restored in 2002 and now houses a visitor centre.

=== Roads ===
The road system around Northwich can be dated back to the Roman times. The A556 and A559 follow the route of the Roman road that runs from Chester to York. The A556 diverts away from the route of the Roman road following a new route to the south of the town acting as the town's bypass. The Chester to Manchester road became a Turnpike in 1769.

The A530, known as King Street, also passes near to the town, and this follows the route of the Roman road that connected Warrington and Middlewich. The old route to Warrington and the north from Middlewich, however, was replaced by a new route through Knutsford, which became a turnpike in 1753. Northwich is connected to the motorway network to the north of the town via the A559 onto the M56 motorway; and to the east of the town via the A556 at junction 19 of the M6.

=== Railway ===
Northwich railway station, last rebuilt in 1897, is a stop on the Mid-Cheshire Line between Chester, Stockport and Manchester Piccadilly; Northern Trains operates a generally hourly service in each direction. Other nearby stations are at Greenbank, which is also on the Mid-Cheshire Line, and Hartford on the West Coast Main Line.

The railway came to the town in 1863, when the Cheshire Midland Railway constructed its line from Knutsford. The West Cheshire Railway built its line to Helsby in 1869. Passenger trains from Northwich to Chester, via Delamere commenced in 1875.

=== Buses ===
Bus routes are operated predominately by Warrington's Own Buses and D&G Bus, linking Northwich with Weaverham, Hartford, Crewe, Warrington, Kelsall and Chester.

Family-run coach company, Walker's Coaches, was based in Anderton, before being taken over by Holmeswood Coaches, which still runs the Northwich depot.

== Education ==
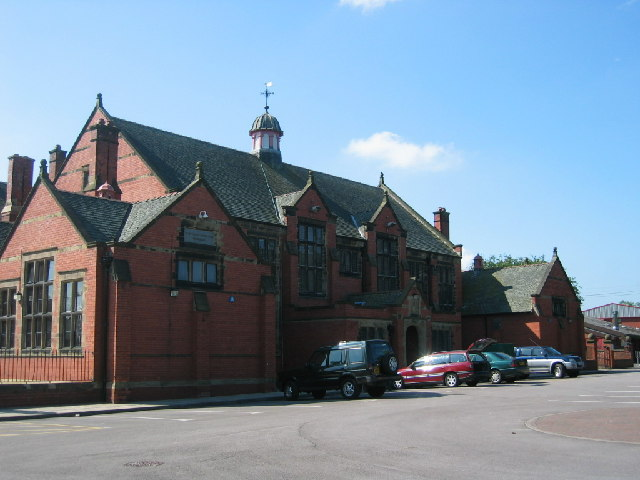
Sir John Deane's College

Northwich and its surroundings has a number of schools and colleges. Sir John Deane's College is now a sixth form college, but was originally formed as a grammar school in 1557. The school was originally known as Witton Grammar School and was erected close to Witton Chapel. The school moved to its current location, to the south of the town, in 1907–08. The Grange School, Northwich is an independent school.

Primary schools include:

- The Grange Junior
- Witton Church Walk CofE
- Victoria Road
- Charles Darwin Community
- Winnington Park Community
- St Wilfrid's Catholic
- Hartford Manor
- Hartford County
- Kingsmead was shortlisted for the Prime Minister's Better Public Building award in 2005.
- Rosebank School is a school for autistic children, aged 3–11 years.

During the 19th century, many new schools were founded and, by 1850, twelve academies were recorded in the area. The town is now served by County High School Leftwich, a specialist media arts college, while Rudheath Senior Academy, a specialist performing arts college and Hartford Church of England High School both admit pupils from Northwich. There are also several primary schools in the area. St. Nicholas Catholic High School is also in the local vicinity and performs well on national exam boards, coming second in the whole of Cheshire.

Mid Cheshire College had its main campus in nearby Hartford, offering further education courses. The campus closed in 2018 after it merged with Warrington Collegiate a year earlier to form Warrington and Vale Royal College.

In November 2005, as part of the Northwich Vision, a refurbishment of the town's railway station included a centre called Zone that promotes lifelong learning by offering people the opportunity to access a range of on-line and taught courses.

== Culture and community ==
The town hosts a number of large annual festivals, including music, river and the famous Northwich Pina Colada events.

Since 2021, an annual Piña Colada Festival has taken place in recognition of Rupert Holmes who was born in the town and wrote "Escape (The Piña Colada Song)", released in 1979. The festival grew in 2022, with live music, fairground rides and old school street games among other attractions. Local bars, restaurants and cafés offered piña coladas alongside other tropical themed drinks and snacks.

Northwich Memorial Hall was opened in 1960, but closed for redevelopment in 2013 to be replaced by the Memorial Court Facility; this opened in 2015. It hosted a range of activities, including pantomimes, music events and the Purple Cactus Comedy Club.

The Harlequin Theatre produces six plays each year and is also the home of Northwich Folk Club, which has run continuously since 1977.

The Regal cinema closed in 2007 and was demolished; a new cinema opened in the Barons Quay development in 2016. Northwich Plaza also offered a wide range of music gigs and other cultural events.

Local horror author Stuart Neild's first novel, A Haunted Man, was set in the salt mines that run underneath Northwich, combining fact with supernatural fiction. Neild's novels featuring Northwich and other North West locations. A Hollywood film and television series was in development.

== Media ==
Local news and television programmes are provided by BBC North West and ITV Granada. Television signals are received from the Winter Hill TV transmitter.

The town is served by both BBC Radio Merseyside and BBC Radio Stoke. Other radio stations include Capital North West & Wales, Heart North West, Smooth North West, Greatest Hits Radio Staffordshire & Cheshire, Silk Radio, and Radio Northwich, a community based local station.

The local newspaper is the Northwich Guardian, which is published on Wednesdays.

== Sport ==
Northwich is the home of three non-league football teams: Witton Albion, Northwich Victoria and 1874 Northwich. In May 2018, the Cheshire FA announced plans for a £70m development near Northwich, modelled on St George's Park National Football Centre. The facility would include two FIFA-standard pitches with a 1000-seat stadium, 3G pitches, six grass pitches, full medical facilities and a hotel/spa.

The town has two rugby union sides: Northwich RUFC and Winnington Park.

The area also boasts several amateur cricket clubs, including Winnington Park CC, Davenham CC, Weaverham CC, Northwich CC and Hartford CC.

Northwich also has a successful competitive swimming team, Northwich Swimming Club, first formed in the late 19th century.

Northwich Rowing Club was formed in 1875 and continues to row on the River Weaver, producing Olympic and international rowers such as Matt Langridge. The club has its own boat and clubhouse located by The Crescent and holds three events every year, the Autumn Head in November, the Spring Head in April and the Regatta in May. In 2015, the club was the first rowing club from the north of England to win the Junior Coxed Quad Sculls at the Head of the River Fours on the tideway in London. Club crews have also competed in the Henley Royal Regatta, with a crew seeded in 2015 for the first time in the club's history. The club also has a large junior section taking rowers on from age 12.

The Northwich Festival, held at Moss Farm Sports Complex each August includes the UK Strongman-North Competition.

The town also has a long-standing cycling club, Weaver Valley CC. Established in 1962, its members included ex-pro and ITV commentator Paul Sherwen and domestic rider Alan Kemp. The club competes in road racing, time trials, track racing and off-road. The club promotes three road races, a series of circuit races in June at Oulton Park, the Cat and Fiddle hill climb, and cyclo-cross in September. Since 1980, the club has promoted the Cheshire Classic women's cycling road race, held every April. Part of British Cycling's National Road Race Series, it is the longest running race on the women's national calendar. Previous winners include Dame Sarah Storey, Lucy Garner, Lizzie Armitstead, Nicole Cooke and Mandy Jones.

The first known swimming baths in Northwich was the Verdin Baths, situated on Verdin Park, presented by Robert Verdin in commemoration of the Jubilee of Queen Victoria in 1887. It consisted of a 60-by-20-foot (18.3 m × 6.1 m) cast-iron plunge bath and five slipper baths. Northwich Public Baths was built in 1913, following subsidence at Verdin Park pool. It its doors on 23 January 1991 to be replaced with Moss Farm leisure complex; this, in turn, was replaced by Memorial Court entertainment and leisure venue in 2015.

== Notable people ==
=== Politics and public service ===
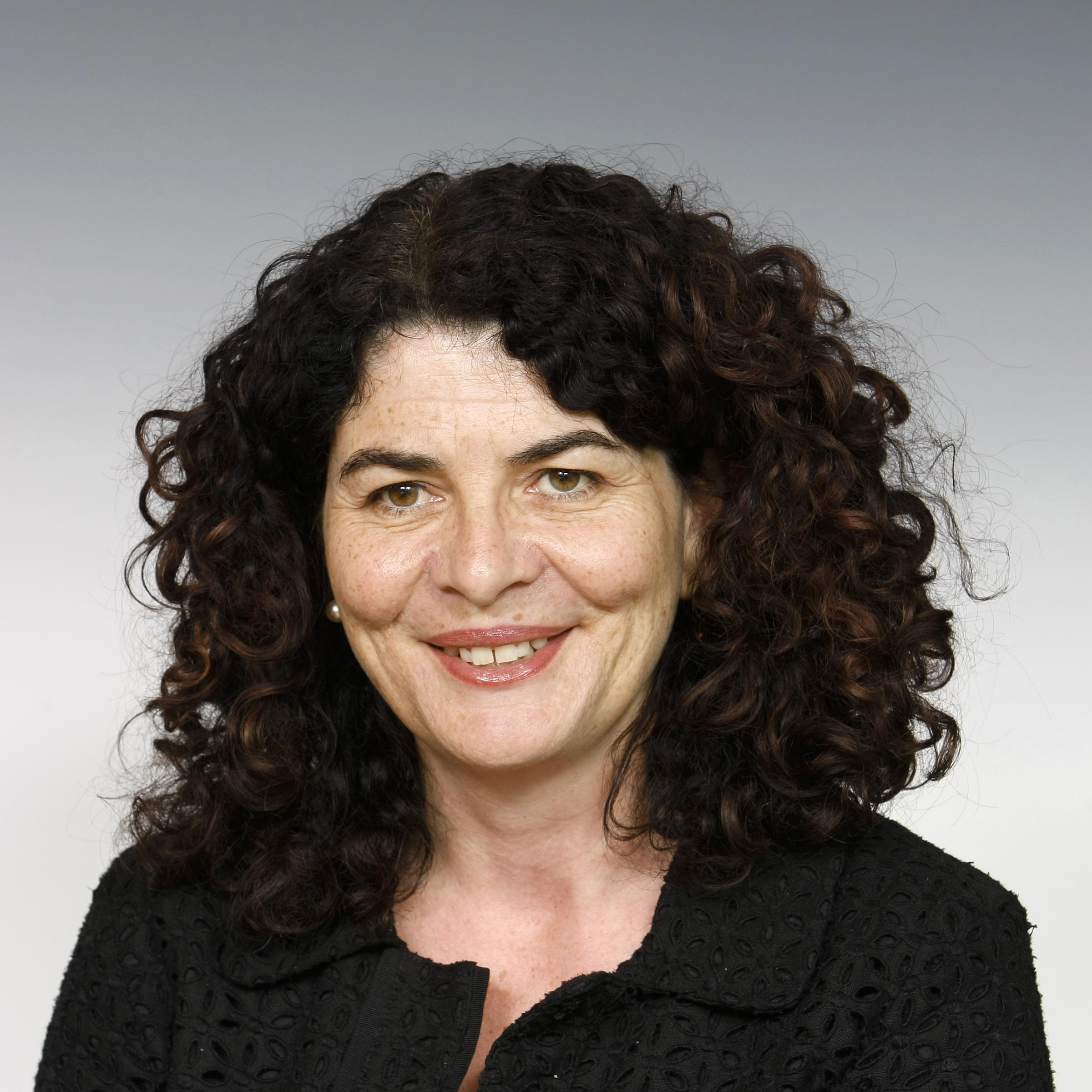
Diana Johnson, 2012

- Robert Verdin (1836 in Witton – 1887) a salt manufacturer, philanthropist and MP for Northwich 1886–1887
- William Allen Whitworth (1840–1905) was an English mathematician and a priest in the Church of England, schooled at the Sandicroft School in Northwich.
- Geoffrey Cheshire (1886 in Northwich – 1978) an English barrister, scholar and influential writer on law
- Sir Philip Holland (1917 in Northwich – 2011) Conservative MP for Acton 1959-1964 and for Carlton 1966-1983
- Arthur Dodd (1919 in Northwich – 2011) British Army soldier in WWII; a Prisoner of War at Auschwitz
- Paul Dean, Baron Dean of Harptree (1924 in Northwich – 2009) MP for North Somerset 1964 to 1983
- John Greenway (born 1946) MP for Ryedale 1987-2010, was born and educated in the town
- Diana Johnson (born 1966) MP for Hull North since 2005, born and educated in the town
- Mary-Ann Ochota (born 1981 in Wincham) a British broadcaster and anthropologist specialising in archaeology, social history and adventure factual television.

=== Creative arts ===
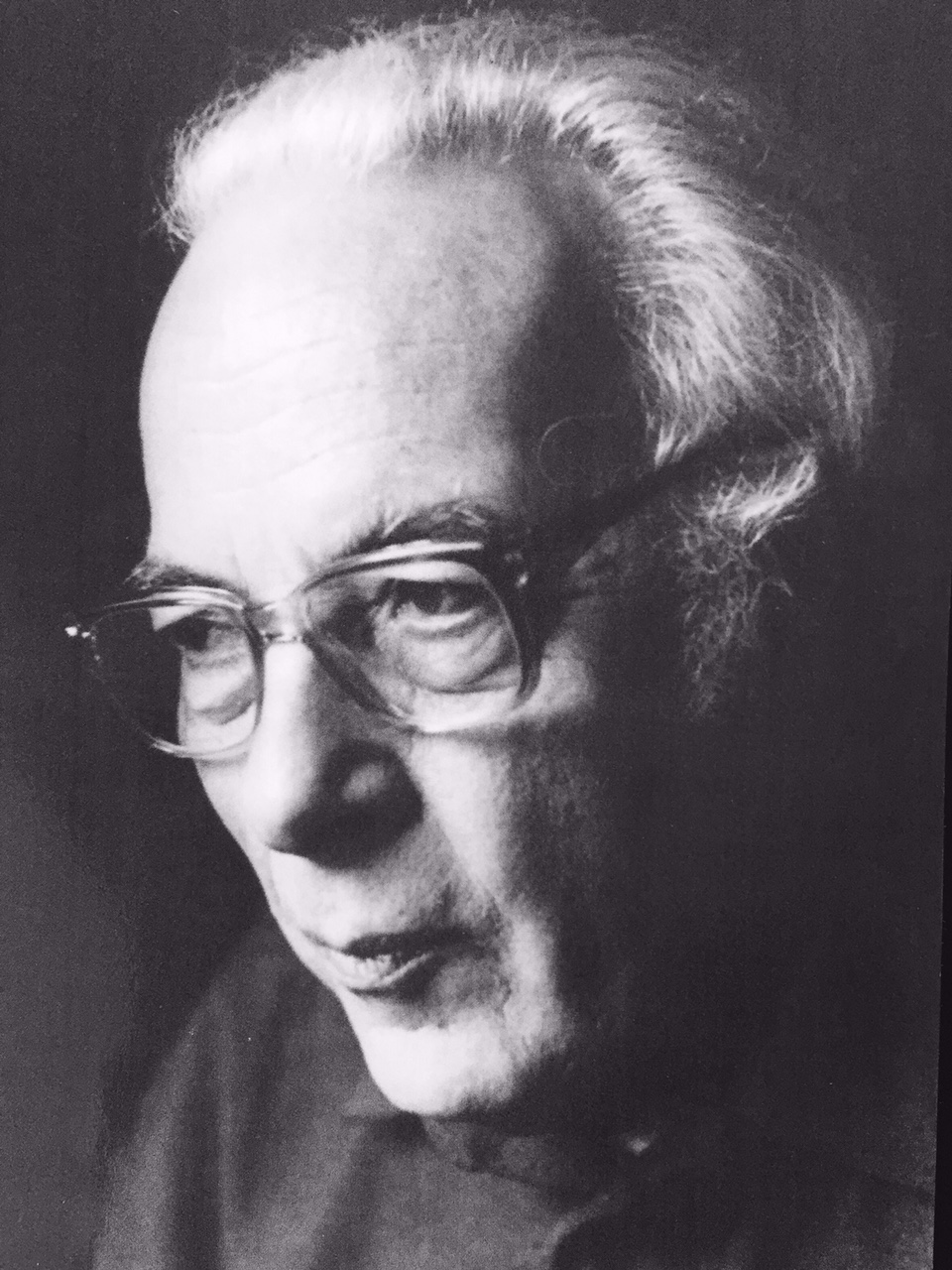
Peter Gammond, 2015

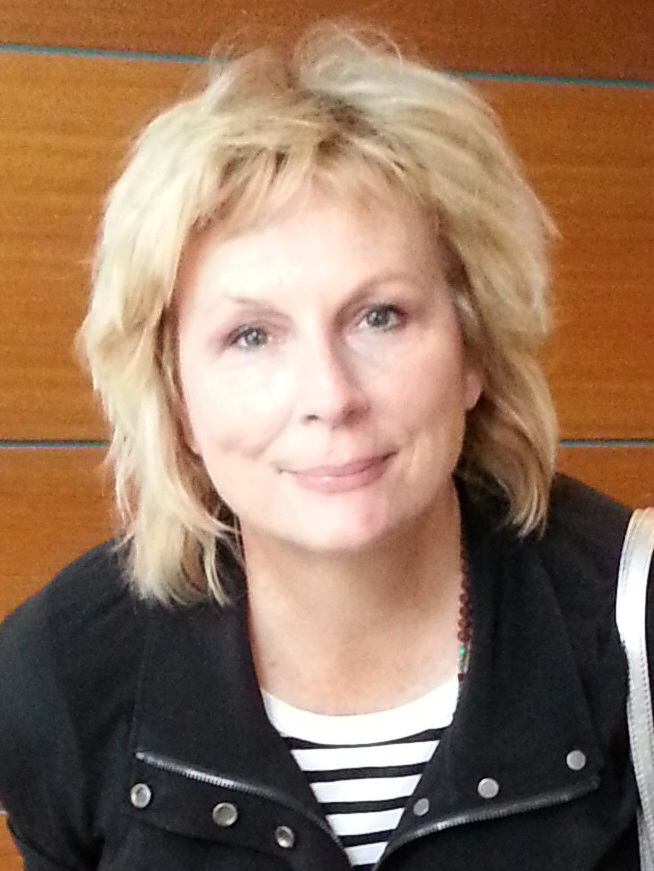
Jennifer Saunders, 2014

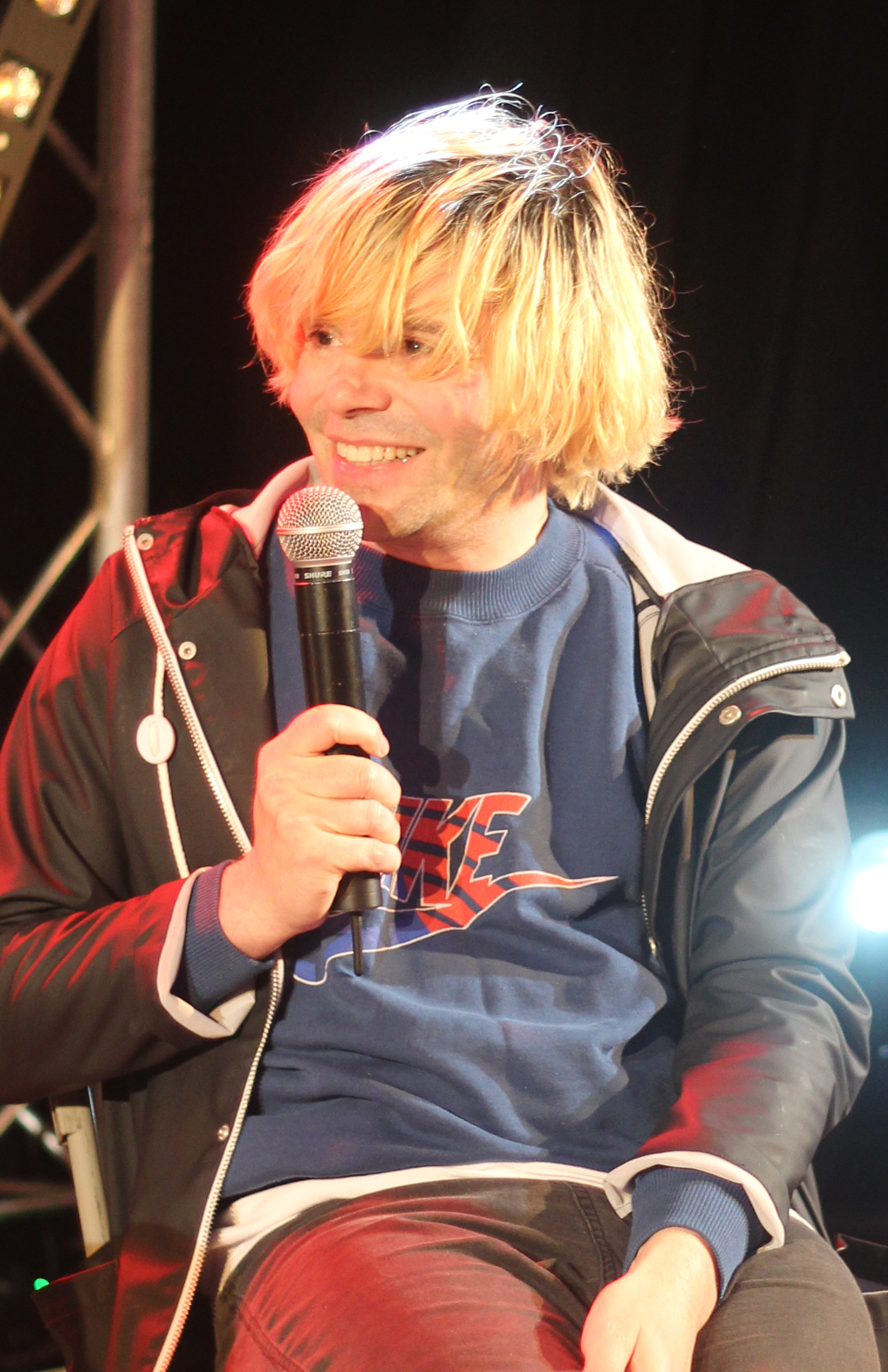
Tim Burgess, 2014

- Bob Crossley (1912 in Northwich – 2010) abstract artist, worked in oil and acrylic; lived in Cornwall from 1959
- Percy M. Young (1912 in Northwich – 2004) a British musicologist, organist, composer, conductor and teacher
- Peter Gammond (born 1925 in Winnington - 2019) a British music critic, writer, journalist, musician, poet, and artist.
- Robert Westall (1929–1993) the children's author lived in the town, Head of Art and Careers at Sir John Deane's Grammar School.
- Sue Birtwistle (born 1945 in Northwich) a producer and writer of television costume drama
- Rupert Holmes (born 1947 in Northwich) composer, songwriter and author, now lives in New York
- Malcolm Garrett (born 1956 in Northwich) a British graphic designer
- Jennifer Saunders (born 1958) actress and comedian, attended Northwich Girls' Grammar School
- Jim Tavaré (born 1963) an English stand-up comedian, actor, and musician. He attended art school in Northwich.
- Moira Buffini (born 1965) an English dramatist, director, and actor.
- Tim Burgess (born 1967) a singer-songwriter and lead singer of the alternative rock band The Charlatans
- Steve Hewitt (born 1971 in Northwich) English musician, singer-songwriter, record producer and former drummer for the band Placebo, 1996–2007
- Helsinki Seven (formed 2006) an alternative rock band from Northwich.

=== Science & Industry ===
- Peter Drinkwater (1750–1801) an English cotton manufacturer and merchant. In 1782 he opened his first cotton mill on the River Weaver in Northwich
- Eaton Hodgkinson (1789 in Anderton – 1861) an English engineer, a pioneer of the application of mathematics to problems of structural design.
- Sir Joseph Verdin, 1st Baronet (1838 in Witton – 1920) ran a family salt business known as Joseph Verdin & Sons with his brothers, Robert and William, lived at The Brockhurst in the town.
- Ludwig Mond (1839–1909) German-born co-founder of Brunner Mond, a soda factory in Winnington
- Sir John Brunner, 1st Baronet (1842–1919) co-founder of chemical firm Brunner Mond in 1873, MP for Northwich 1885–1886 and from 1887 to 1910, lived at Winnington Hall
- William James Yarwood (1851–1926) shipbuilder and proprietor of W. J. Yarwood & Sons, a local shipbuilding business on the River Weaver
- Harold Drinkwater (1855-1925) physician and botanical artist, born and raised in Northwich
- Arron Banks (born 1966 in Northwich) a British businessman and political donor.

=== Sport ===
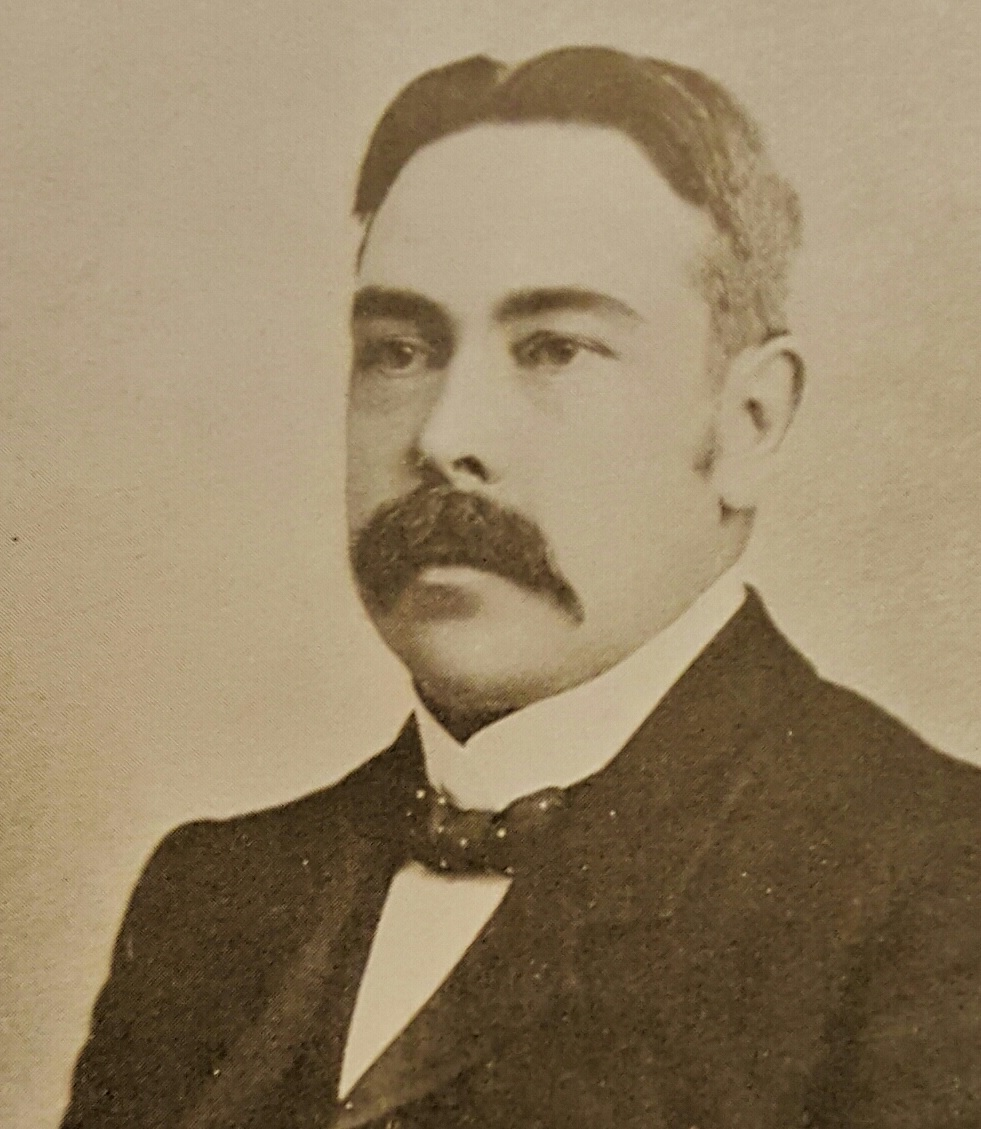
Charles James Hughes, 1907

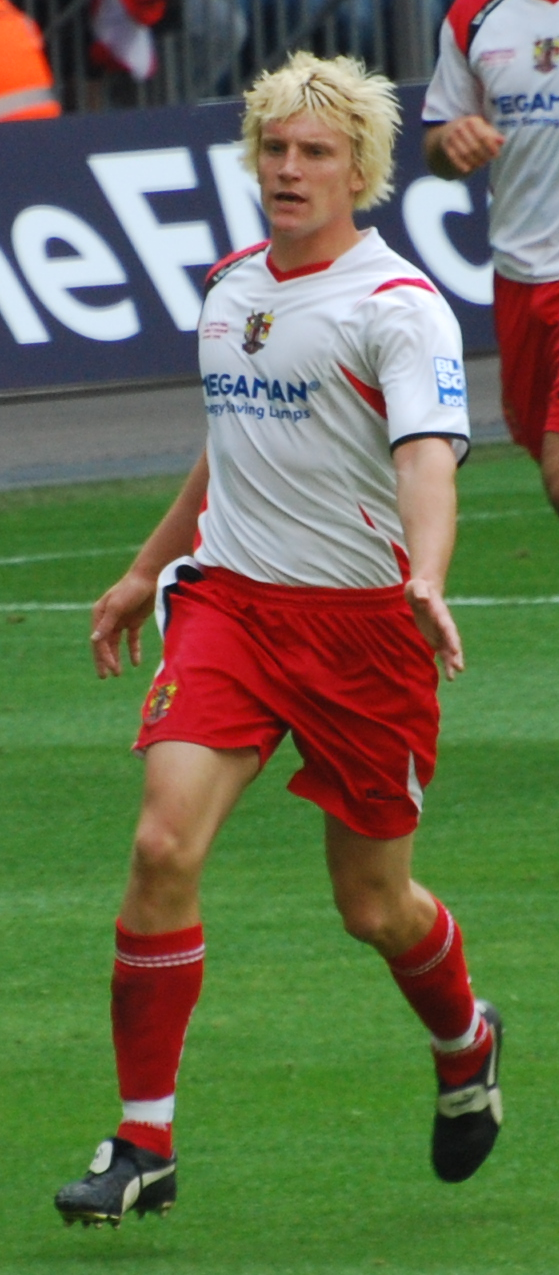
Mark Roberts, 2009

- Charles James Hughes (1853 in Northwich –1916), footballer, referee, and co-founder of Northwich Victoria
- George Elmore (1880 in Witton – 1916 Somme), footballer, played over 200 games
- John Boden (1882 in Northwich – 1946), footballer, played over 300 games
- Billy Harrison (1886 in Wybunbury – 1948), footballer, played 412 games, including 317 for Wolves
- Jack Lees (1892 in Northwich – 1983), footballer, played 279 games
- Jack Eyres (1899 in Lostock Gralam – 1975), footballer, played 257 games
- Sid Collins Jr. (1912 in Northwich – 1983) golfer
- Tom Manley (1912 in Northwich – 1988), footballer and manager, played over 300 games
- Brian Siddall (1930 in Northwich – 2007), footballer, played 202 games
- Zandra Nowell (born 1936 in Northwich), alpine skier, competed at the 1956 Winter Olympics
- Malcolm Arnold (born 1940 in Northwich), athletics coach
- Dennis Walker (1944 in Northwich - 2003), footballer, played over 220 games
- Jim Walker (born 1947 in Northwich), footballer, played over 250 games
- Mike Whitlow (born 1968 in Northwich), footballer, played 397 games
- Michael Oakes (born 1973 in Northwich), footballer, played 282 games
- Andy Oakes (born 1977 in Northwich), football goalkeeper, played 118 games
- Matt Langridge (born 1983), team medallist in the men's eight rowing at the 2008, 2012 and 2016 Summer Olympics, grew up locally
- Mark Roberts (born 1983 in Northwich), footballer, played 575 games
- Craig Jones (1985–2008), motorcycle racer, grew up locally
- Jason Oswell (born 1992 in Northwich), footballer, played over 300 games.
- Hugo Cook (born 2004 in Northwich), racing driver

== Twin towns ==
Northwich is twinned with:

- Dole, France
- Carlow, Republic of Ireland.

== Coat of arms ==
Coat of arms of Northwich
Notes Originally granted to Nortwich Urban District Council, 10 September 1962. Crest An ancient three-masted ship pennons flying Or the mainsail Azure charged with a wyvern sejant Argent the foresail Gules charged with a mullet of six points Gold and the mizzen sail also Gules charged with a fountain. Torse A wreath of the colours. Escutcheon Azure a pall wavy reversed Argent between three Garbs Or. Motto Sal Est Vita (Salt Is Life) Badge An eagle displayed Azure ducally crowned Gules charged on the breast and wings with three garbs Or.

== See also ==
- Salt in Cheshire
- Tata Chemicals Europe
- Listed buildings in Northwich
- Winnington Hall
- Holy Trinity Church, Northwich
