= Listed buildings in Great Budworth =

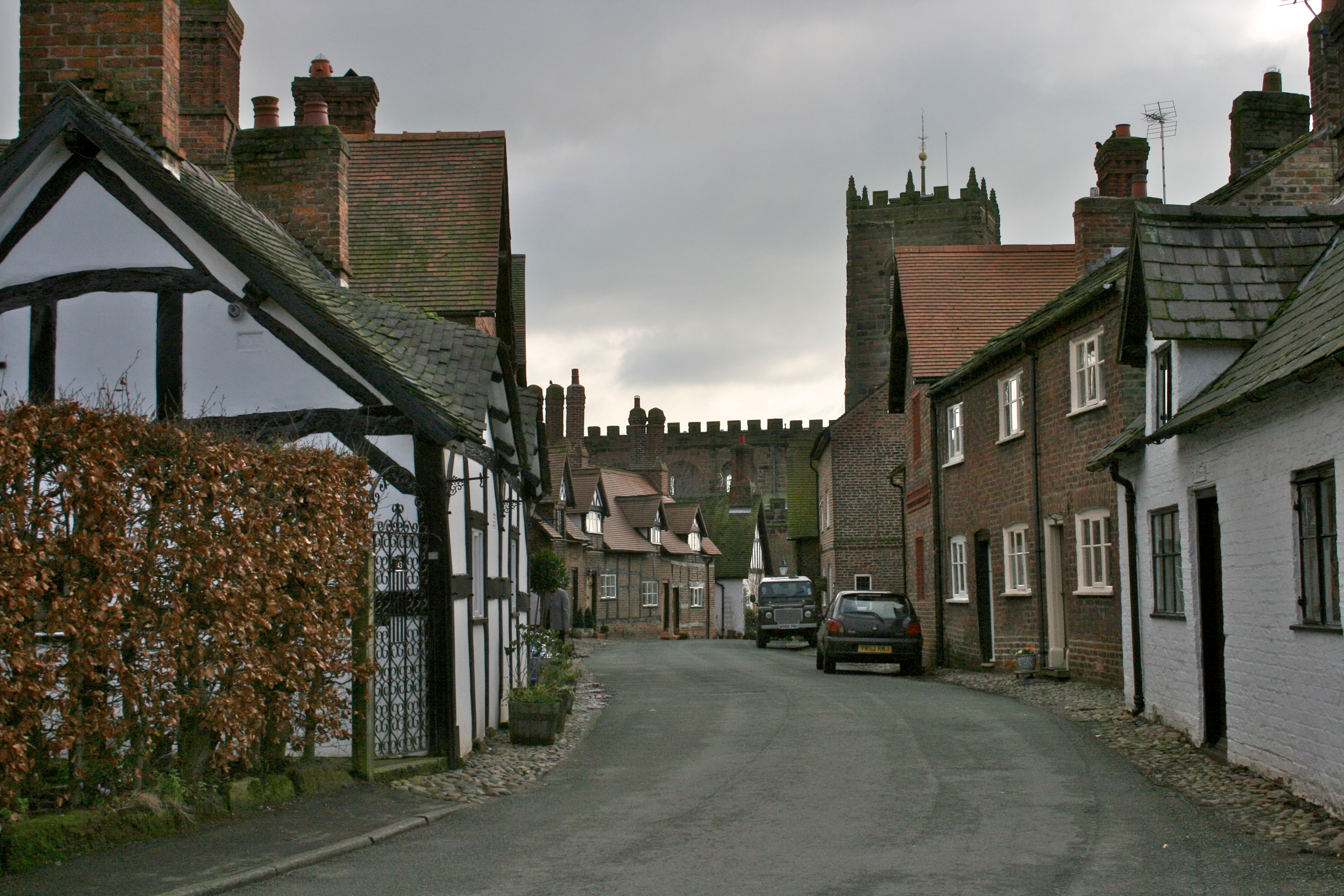
Church Street, Great Budworth, where almost all the buildings are listed

Great Budworth is a civil parish in Cheshire West and Chester, England. The parish contains 59 buildings that are recorded in the National Heritage List for England as designated listed buildings. Other than the village of Great Budworth, the parish is entirely rural. Most of the listed buildings are houses, or buildings relating to farming, a high proportion of which are located within the village itself. The village is described by Norman Bilsborough as being "probably one of the best-known villages in Cheshire", and Claire Hartwell et al. writing about the village in the Buildings of England series state "the immediate surroundings of the church make one of the best pieces of villagescape in the county". The village is located in what was part of the estate of Arley Hall. Between the 1860s and the end of the 19th century the owner of the hall, Rowland Egerton-Warburton, commissioned the restoration of existing buildings in the village and the construction of new ones. To this end he employed architects working in the Vernacular Revival style, including John Douglas, Edmund Kirby, and William Eden Nesfield. Douglas' biographer Edward Hubbard states that Egerton-Warburton had a "campaign to restore the village and render it picturesque in Victorian eyes". Almost all the buildings in the centre of the village, those in Main Street, Church Street, and School Lane, are listed.

Of the 59 listed buildings, two are listed at Grade I, the highest grade, with one at Grade II*, the middle grade. The church in the centre of the village, St Mary and All Saints, is listed at Grade I. It originated in the 14th century and was virtually complete by the end of the 16th century, although it underwent a series of restorations in the 19th century. It is described by Hartwell et al. as being "one of the most satisfactory Perpendicular churches of Cheshire". The other Grade I listed building is Belmont Hall, about 1 mile (1.6 km) northwest of the village. This was designed by James Gibbs in about 1750, and incorporates Palladian features, although the design was altered during the construction of the house, probably by the executant architect. Its most notable feature is the fine rococo plasterwork in the interior. The house is included in Simon Jenkins' England's Thousand Best Houses. The Grade II* listed building is the Old School House, built in 1615 as a school, and later converted into a reading room, then into a meeting room. Of the Grade II listed buildings, many of them are houses and farm buildings constructed in the 17th century. These are basically timber-framed buildings, some incorporating crucks, but most have since been recased, wholly or partly, in brick. Of the other structures, two are public houses: the Cock Inn, and the George and Dragon Inn. More unusual structures that have been listed are the churchyard walls, the sundial in the churchyard, the stocks standing outside the churchyard walls, the lychgate at the entrance to the churchyard, the guidepost standing on the A559 road, two wellhouses, and the telephone kiosk in High Street.

== Key ==
Grade	Criteria
I	Buildings of exceptional interest, sometimes considered to be internationally important.
II*	Particularly important buildings of more than special interest.
II	Buildings of national importance and special interest.

== Buildings ==
Name and location	Photograph	Date	Notes	Grade
St Mary and All Saints' Church; 53.2936°N 2.5044°W		14th century	The oldest part of the church is the Lady chapel, dating from the 14th century, with the rest of the church being built in the following two centuries. Alterations were carried out during the 19th century by various architects, including Anthony Salvin, William Butterfield and John Douglas, when the church's major benefactor was Rowland Egerton-Warburton of Arley Hall. It is constructed in sandstone, and its architectural style is Perpendicular.	I
Churchyard walls 53.29357°N 2.50482°W		Late medieval	Constructed in sandstone and brick, the wall stands on the north, west and south sides of St Mary and All Saints' Church. Parts of it are medieval, and other parts date from the 18th and 19th centuries.	II
Old Schoolhouse; 53.2939°N 2.5041°W		1615	A school in the churchyard built for Sir John Deane, later used as a meeting room. It is a brick building with sandstone dressings on a sandstone plinth, with a stone-slate roof, stone quoins, and timber-framed gables. It has a rectangular plan, is in two storeys, and has mullioned windows. The upper storey was added in about 1750, and the building was restored in 1860 for Rowland Egerton-Warburton.	II*
50 Church Street; 53.2939°N 2.5048°W		Early 17th century	This originated as a public house, later converted into a cottage. It is timber-framed on a partly rendered sandstone plinth with tiled roofs. It consists of a left wing and a projecting cross-wing, and is in one storey plus an attic. The windows consists of casements and an eyebrow dormer. Inside is a barrel-vaulted cellar, some wattle and daub, and an inglenook with an oak bressumer.	II
20 High Street; 53.2933°N 2.5061°W		Early 17th century	This originated as Saracen's Head Farmhouse. It is partly pebbledashed, partly timber-framed with plaster panels on a sandstone plinth, partly recased in brick, and has a small brick extension. Inside is an inglenook and, all in oak, a bressumer, beams, joists, and brackets; one of the brackets is carved with a female figure and dates from about 1600.	II
21 High Street; 53.2933°N 2.5059°W		Early 17th century	A timber-framed cottage on a sandstone plinth with tiled roofs. It is in one storey with an attic. The windows are mullioned with a dormer in the attic.	II
Smithy Cottage; 53.2946°N 2.5054°W		Early 17th century	Located at 44 Church Street, this is a timber-framed house, which was recased in brick in probably the 19th century, and which has a tiled roof. It is in one storey plus an attic, and has casement windows.	II
35 and 36, School Lane; 53.29385°N 2.50459°W		17th century	A pair of adjoining cottages in a single storey with attics. The front is pebbledashed, probably on timber framing, and the roofs are tiled. Each cottage has a single window in the lower storey, and there are three gabled dormers above with oak-framed fronts.	II
7 The Mount; 53.2928°N 2.5076°W	—	17th century	This originated as a shippon and was later converted into a house for Rowland Egerton-Warburton. It is constructed in timber framing with brick nogging and crucks on sandstone and brick plinths. The house is in one storey, the roofs are tiled, and it has been partly rebuilt in brick.	II
8 The Mount; 53.2928°N 2.5078°W	—	17th century	Originally a stable, this was converted into a cottage for Rowland Egerton-Warburton. It is basically timber-framed, now encased in brick, with a tiled roof. It is in 1½ storeys plus an attic, and contains a three-light mullioned window.	II
Hilly Bank Cottage; 53.2927°N 2.5081°W	—	17th century	This is located at 9 The Mount. Originally a farmhouse, the 17th-century part of the house is timber-framed with plaster panels. It was partly recased in brick in the 18th century, and extended in the 20th century. The extension is in painted brick. The house is in one storey plus attics.	II
Old Hall; 53.2934°N 2.5065°W		17th century	Located at 58 High Street, the house has been much altered since it was built. It is constructed in plaster, pebbledash and brick, the plaster probably on timber framing. It is in two storeys, the upper storey being jettied. The windows are mullioned and transomed.	II
62 High Street; 53.2931°N 2.5073°W		17th century (probable)	The cottage was altered in the 19th century. Its exterior has lined render, and the roof is tiled. The cottage is in one storey with an attic. It has mullioned and transomed windows, and a dormer with a four-pane casement window.	II
10 and 11 The Mount; 53.2930°N 2.5072°W		17th century (probable)	A pair of cottages, partly rebuilt and much altered in the 19th century for Rowland Egerton-Warburton. They are in brick with tiled roofs, and have a single storey plus attics. The windows are casements and gabled dormers.	II
Rose Cottage; 53.2939°N 2.5045°W		17th century (probable)	This is located at 34 School Lane. It is probably basically a timber-framed cottage that was later pebbledashed. It has a tiled roof, and is in 1½ storeys. The windows are casements.	II
32 and 33 School Lane; 53.29391°N 2.50434°W		Mid-17th century	This originated as a barn and two cottages. The building is timber framed with crucks on a sandstone plinth, and has a tiled roof. It is in a single storey with attics. The windows are casements and dormers.	II
Cobb Cottage; 53.2944°N 2.5051°W		Mid-17th century	Located at 43 Church Street, this is a timber-framed cottage with a tiled roof. It is in one storey and an attic; in the attic are eyebrow dormers.	II
Cock Inn; 53.2963°N 2.5164°W		Mid-17th century	Later a public house and restaurant, this originated as a farmhouse with a barn at the rear. It is in painted brick and pebbledash with a slate roof. The building is in three storeys, with a wall sundial at the right end. Some of the windows are mullioned and transomed, others are casements or gabled dormers.	II
The Old Smithy; 53.2944°N 2.5053°W		Mid-17th century	This is located at 45 Church Street. It is a timber-framed cottage with crucks, later recased in brick, which is now painted. The cottage is in one storey with an attic. The windows are casements and gabled dormers.	II
37, 38 and 39 Church Street; 53.2940°N 2.5047°W		Mid-17th century (probable)	A row of three timber-framed cottages with brick nogging and tiled roofs. They were restored in the 19th century for Rowland Egerton-Warburton; parts have been rebuilt in brick. The cottages are in one storey plus and attic. The windows are casements, with dormers in the attics.	II
40 Church Street; 53.2941°N 2.5047°W		Mid-17th century (probable)	Basically timber-framed, this cottage was recased in brick in the 19th century for Rowland Egerton-Warburton. It has a small timber-framed rear wing on a brick plinth. The windows are casements and dormers. The cottage is decorated with brick diapering and lozenge-shaped plaster panels.	II
15 High Street; 53.2932°N 2.5066°W		Mid-17th century (probable)	A timber-framed cottage standing on a brick plinth; altered in the 19th century for Rowland Egerton-Warburton. The rear has been rebuilt in brick. On the front are casement windows, and a 19th-century plaster frieze decorated with Tudor roses and scrollwork.	II
59 High Street; 53.2932°N 2.5068°W		Mid-17th century (probable)	A timber-framed cottage on a sandstone plinth with a tiled roof. It is in 1½ storeys, and has casement windows.	II
61 High Street; 53.2931°N 2.5072°W		Mid-17th century (probable)	Basically a timber-framed cottage, it has since been altered. The exterior is pebbledashed, and it has a slate roof. The cottage is in two storeys with an attic. The windows are casements.	II
Fairfield Cottage; 53.2971°N 2.5165°W		Mid-17th century (probable)	A timber-framed building with plaster panels on a sandstone plinth with a stone-slate roof. It was refurbished in the 19th century with parts rebuilt in brick for Rowland Egerton-Warburton probably by John Douglas. It contains mullioned windows and a dormer gable.	II
Box Hedge Hall Barn; 53.2931°N 2.5219°W		Late 17th century	Originating as a farm building, this has been converted into a house. It is timber-framed on a sandstone plinth, and has a steeply pitched tiled roof. The building is in one storey plus an attic.	II
Westage Farmhouse and shippon 53.2958°N 2.5011°W	—	Late 17th century	This is timber-framed with the gable-ends rebuilt in brick; it has a tiled roof. The building is in 1½ storeys. A timber-framed gabled porch was added in the 19th century. The windows are casements.	II
Budworth Heath Farmhouse; 53.3024°N 2.5053°W	—	c. 1700	This is constructed in brick with roofs of stone-slate largely replaced by slate. It is in two storeys plus an attic. The building has a symmetrical main block with a three-storey porch, and a two-storey right wing. The windows are casements.	II
54–57 High Street; 53.2935°N 2.5060°W	—	Early 18th century (or before)	A row of four cottages that were partly rebuilt and refaced by John Douglas for Rowland Egerton-Warburton in the early 1870s. They are constructed in brick with tiled roofs, and are in two storeys plus attics. The end two houses are larger than the middle two; all have different features.	II
Hough Farmhouse; 53.2940°N 2.5049°W		1725	Located at 49 Church Street, this is a brick building in two storeys with a tiled roof and casement windows. At the rear is a lower wing with stone-slate roofs, mullioned windows and a dormer.	II
Stocks; 53.29361°N 2.50483°W		Early 18th century (probable)	The stocks consist of two rectangular grooved sandstone posts with rounded tops. The wooden boards have been replaced.	II
Belmont Hall; 53.3011°N 2.5198°W		1755	Designed as a country house by James Gibbs, although changes were made to the design during construction. It is built in brown brick and has a slate roof. The entrance façade is symmetrical with seven bays and three storeys. Internally there is fine plaster decoration in Rococo style. As of 2013 the building is occupied by Cransley School.	I
Main Lodge, Belmont Hall; 53.2975°N 2.5169°W		c. 1755	A lodge with a symmetrical front, constructed in brick with stone dressings and a slate roof. It has a stone porch with Tuscan columns, and an entablature. The windows are sashes.	II
Sundial; 53.29330°N 2.50431°W		Late 18th century	The sundial is located in the churchyard to the south of the church. It is in stone and consists of a vase baluster with a square flagstone base and one circular step. It holds a copper dial and gnomon.	II
South Bank Cottages; 53.2933°N 2.5038°W		Late 18th century (probable)	This originated as a house, later divided into three dwellings. The main block has two storeys, and is in brick with a tile roof. To the left is a single-storey timber-framed room with brick nogging that may date back to the 17th century. Most of the windows are mullioned, and there are also some dormers.	II
Wall and gate piers, 58 High Street; 53.29329°N 2.50650°W	—	c. 1800 (probable)	The wall is of sandstone, and is about 1.4 metres (5 ft) high. Each gate pier consists of a painted monolith, with a plinth, panelled faces and entablatures, about 2.5 metres (8 ft) high.	II
46 and 47 Church Street; 53.2943°N 2.5052°W		Early 19th century (or earlier)	A pair of brick cottages with stone-slate roofs. They are in two storeys and contain casement windows.	II
12 and 13 High Street; 53.2932°N 2.5063°W	—	Early 19th century (or earlier)	A house, later divided into two dwellings, in brick with a slate roof. It is in two storeys and has mullioned casement windows.	II
17 and 18 High Street; 53.2932°N 2.5063°W		Early 19th century (or earlier)	Two cottages in late Georgian style, later altered for Rowland Egerton-Warburton. They are pebbledashed on a brick plinth with slate roofs. The cottages are in two storeys, and have a single-storey canted bay window. The other windows are casements.	II
Methodist Church; 53.29445°N 2.50465°W	—	Mid-19th century	A Methodist church built for Rowland Egerton-Warburton. It is a rectangular brick building, with a service wing at right angles, and has slate roofs. The interior of the church is plastered and it has retained its contemporary furnishings.	II
The Manor House; 53.2936°N 2.5052°W		Mid-19th century (probable)	Built for Rowland Egerton-Warburton, this is a brick house in two storeys plus attic, with slate roofs. The windows are and there is decorative brickwork on the front of the house.	II
Providence House; 53.2942°N 2.5047°W		1860s	Originally a girls' school, this has been converted into a house. It is constructed in brick with a tile roof. The main part is in two storeys plus an attic. To the rear is a single storey wing, formerly the schoolroom. Features include a two-storey bay window, and zigzag brickwork between the chimney flues.	II
Goldmine House and Rose Cottage; 53.2931°N 2.5045°W		1864	These are located at 26 Southbank. They consist of a house and a cottage that were designed by John Douglas. The buildings are in 1½ storeys with an irregular plan, and are constructed in brick and timber framing with tiled roofs. Their architectural style is Vernacular Revival.	II
Dene Cottages; 53.2931°N 2.5096°W	—	1865–66	A pair of estate cottages by John Douglas for Rowland Egerton-Warburton in style. The lower storey is in brick, the upper storey is timber-framed. On the front is plaster pargetting including an inscription and floral designs.	II
16 High Street; 53.29313°N 2.50666°W		c. 1870	A post office and village shop built for Rowland Egerton-Warburton. It is in brown brick with a tiled roof. There are two storeys with an attic in a steeply pitched gable. In the ground floor is the shop entrance and a wood-mullioned window. with a brick-mullioned window in the upper storey. The gable contains blue-brick diapering, and at the eaves level is an ornate brick corbel-table.	II
4 The Mount; 53.2929°N 2.5074°W	—	c. 1870	A cottage designed by William Eden Nesfield for Rowland Egerton-Warburton. It is in brick and timber framing, and has tiled roofs. The cottage is in two storeys, with a single-storey wing to the east. The windows are casements. Some of Nesfield's original detailing has been lost.	II
George and Dragon Inn; 53.2937°N 2.5051°W		1875	Formerly a simple Georgian inn, Rowland Egerton-Warburton commissioned John Douglas to restore it. He added tall chimneys, mullioned windows and a steep pyramidal turret. The inn is in brick with a roughcast upper storey, and tiled roofs. It is inscribed with verses written by Egerton-Warburton. Outside is a pictorial inn-sign originating in Nuremberg carried on an ornate wrought iron bracket.	II
22 and 23 High Street; 53.2934°N 2.5056°W		Late 19th century	Three cottages built for Rowland Egerton-Warburton, in brick and timber framing with tiled roofs. They have two storeys, and number 22 has a small attic. Number 22 also has a jettied upper storey.	II
24 High Street; 53.2934°N 2.5055°W		Late 19th century	This originated as a public house, later converted for domestic use. It is in brown brick with slate roofs and sandstone dressings. The house has two storeys, plus a wing to the left, and is decorated with blue-brick diapering. The windows are mullioned.	II
60 High Street; 53.29315°N 2.50705°W		Late 19th century	A cottage built for Rowland Egerton-Warburton. It is pebbledashed with a tiled roof. The gabled dormer contains a five-light brick-mullioned window, and brick diapering with plaster panels.	II
5 The Mount; 53.2929°N 2.5075°W	—	Late 19th century	Possibly originating as a stable, this was converted into a cottage for Rowland Egerton-Warburton. It is constructed in brick with tiled roofs. Some of its windows are mullioned, others are casements. Other features include timber-framed gables, and a shaped brick chimney.	II
Guidepost; 53.29282°N 2.50927°W		Late 19th century	This an octagonal cast iron post on a plinth with an ornate ball finial, and direction plates containing sans serif lettering.	II
Dene Wellhouse (also called Running Pump); 53.29275°N 2.50898°W		1880	A shelter for a well designed by Edmund Kirby. It consists of an oak frame on a sandstone plinth, with a stone-slate roof. At its entrance is a wrought iron gate. It has a spout projecting water into a stone trough, and a plaque inscribed with a verse by Rowland Egerton-Warburton.	II
42 Church Street; 53.2943°N 2.5050°W		c. 1880	A brick house with a tiled roof. It consists of two wings, and contains mullioned casement windows. The house has two shaped brick chimneys.	II
14 High Street; 53.2931°N 2.5068°W		c. 1880	A brick house with a tiled roof built for Rowland Egerton-Warburton. It consists of a right wing with a cross-wing to the left, The front is decorated with brick diapering, and the windows are mullioned.	II
Providence Cottage; 53.2943°N 2.5047°W		1891	Designed by Edmund Kirby for Rowland Egerton-Warburton, this is a two-storey brick house with tiled roofs. Its front contains mullioned windows and brick diapering with lozenge-shaped plaster panels in the gable. To the left is a single-storey loggia that has a timber-framed front on a sandstone plinth.	II
Upper Wellhouse; 53.29381°N 2.50486°W		1891–92	Designed by Edmund Kirby, this is a shelter for a well, with a sandstone plinth, an oak frame, and a tiled hipped roof. The sides and front are open, with a brick wall at the rear. At the front is a wrought iron railing, and on the back wall is an iron plate for the former water spout.	II
Lychgate; 53.29365°N 2.50477°W		1920	The lychgate at the entry to the churchyard was built as a memorial for the First World War. It is timber-framed on a sandstone plinth with a stone-slate roof. Its features include a crucifix on the gable, ornate bargeboards, and bronze plates recording the names of those who served in the war, and those who died.	II
Telephone kiosk 53.29332°N 2.50601°W		1935	A type K6 telephone kiosk, designed by Giles Gilbert Scott, in High Street opposite the Post Office. It is in cast iron and has a domed top.	II

== See also ==
- Listed buildings in Anderton with Marbury
- Listed buildings in Antrobus
- Listed buildings in Aston by Budworth
- Listed buildings in Comberbach
- Listed buildings in Marston
