= Goldmine House =

House in Great Budworth, Cheshire, England

Coordinates: 53.2931°N 2.5044°W

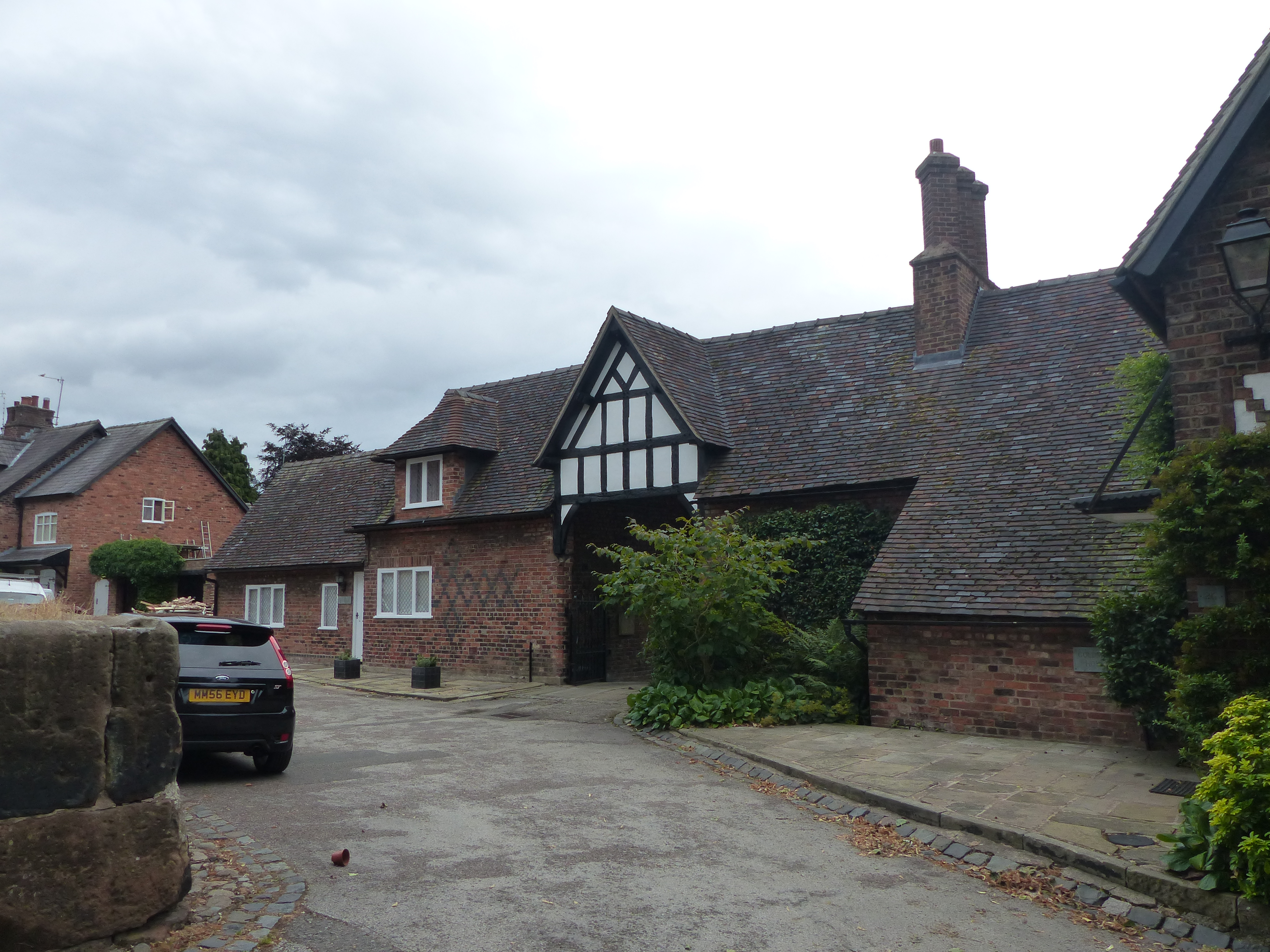
Goldmine House in 2018

Goldmine House and its attached cottage (Rose Cottage) are at No. 26 Southbank, Great Budworth, Cheshire, England, to the south of St Mary and All Saints' Church. They are recorded in the National Heritage List for England as a designated Grade II listed building.

The house and cottage were built for Rowland Egerton-Warburton of Arley Hall and were designed by the Chester architect John Douglas. They were constructed about 1870 in brown brick with some timber framing and clay tile roofs. The house is to the west, is in two storeys, and has two bays, both gabled. The western bay is smaller than that to the east and is set back; its gable is timber-framed. Between the storeys on both wings is a frieze of zigzag brickwork and plaster. To the east of the house is a single-storey extension with a catslide roof and an arched entrance giving access to the rear of the building; over the entrance is a timber framed gable. The cottage is simple in form with a dormer and blue brick diapering. In 1884 the editor of The British Architect, Thomas Raffles Davison, described the building as one of the "very pleasing buildings south of the [church] by Mr Douglas".

== See also ==
- Listed buildings in Great Budworth
- List of houses and associated buildings by John Douglas
