= Methodist Church, Great Budworth =

Coordinates: 53.2945°N 2.5047°W

- Location in Cheshire
- OS grid reference: SJ 665 776
- Location: Great Budworth, Cheshire
- Country: England
- Denomination: Methodist

Architecture
- Functional status: Redundant
- Heritage designation: Grade II
- Designated: 27 August 1986

Specifications
- Materials: Brick, slate roof

The Methodist Church, Great Budworth, is a former Wesleyan Methodist Church in the village of Great Budworth, Cheshire, England. The church is recorded in the National Heritage List for England as a designated Grade II listed building. It was built in the middle of the 19th century for Rowland Egerton-Warburton of nearby Arley Hall. It is constructed in brick, has a slate roof, and consists of a rectangular building with a service wing at right angles. It is now closed and is used as a private house.

== See also ==
- Listed buildings in Great Budworth
