= Dene Cottages, Great Budworth =

Cottages in Great Budworth, Cheshire, England

Coordinates: 53.2931°N 2.5096°W

Dene Cottages consists of a pair of cottages in the village of Great Budworth, Cheshire, England. The cottages are designated by English Heritage as a Grade II listed building.

The cottages were built in 1867–68 for Rowland Egerton-Warburton of Arley Hall and designed by the Chester architect John Douglas. The lower storeys are constructed in brown brick and the upper storeys are timber-framed with plaster panels. The roof is in clay tiles. The plaster panels are pargetted with floral motifs.

== See also ==
- Listed buildings in Great Budworth
- List of houses and associated buildings by John Douglas
