= 54–57 High Street, Great Budworth =

54–57 High Street
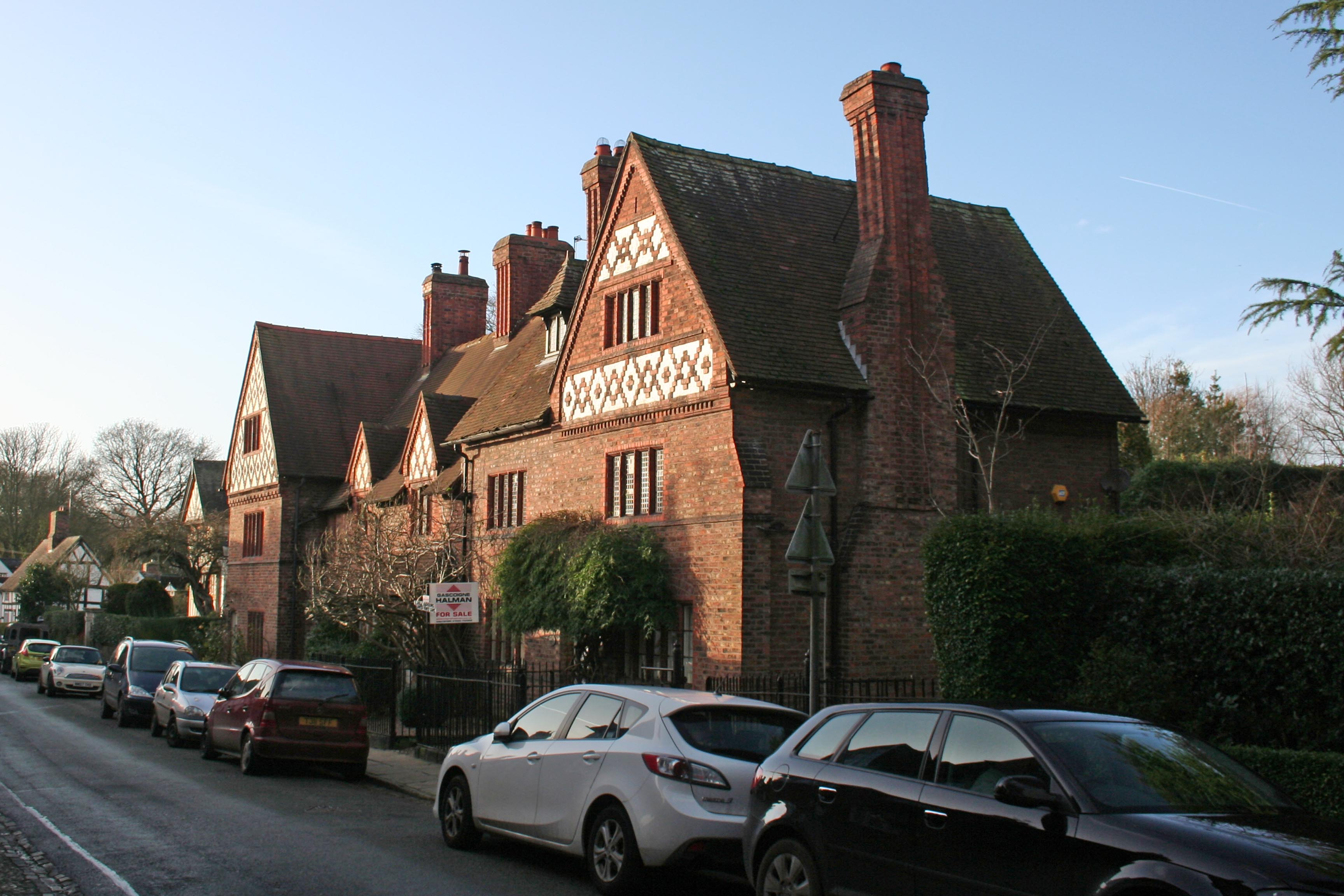
- The building in 2013
- Interactive map of 54–57 High Street
- Location: Great Budworth, Cheshire
- Coordinates: 53.2935°N 2.5060°W
- Restored by: John Douglas

Listed Building – Grade II
- Official name: Jasmine Cottage
- Designated: 27 August 1986
- Reference no.: 1139118

54–57 High Street is a row of four dwellings in High Street, Great Budworth, Cheshire, England. It is recorded on the National Heritage List for England as a designated Grade II listed building.

The dwellings had been built in the early 18th century, or earlier. They were refaced and partly rebuilt for Rowland Egerton-Warburton of Arley Hall, the architect being John Douglas. The work was carried out around 1870, or just before 1875. It was part of Egerton-Warburton's "campaign to restore the village and render it picturesque in Victorian eyes". The two outer buildings are houses and the two central buildings are cottages. They are built in brown brick with clay tile roofs, and have two storeys plus attics. Each building has a gable, those on the outer buildings being larger than those on the inner buildings, and all are decorated with brick and plaster.

== See also ==
- Listed buildings in Great Budworth
- List of houses and associated buildings by John Douglas
