= Goetze and Gwynn =

Goetze and Gwynn is an organ builder in England which has a specialism in restoring pre-Victorian British organs.

== Company ==
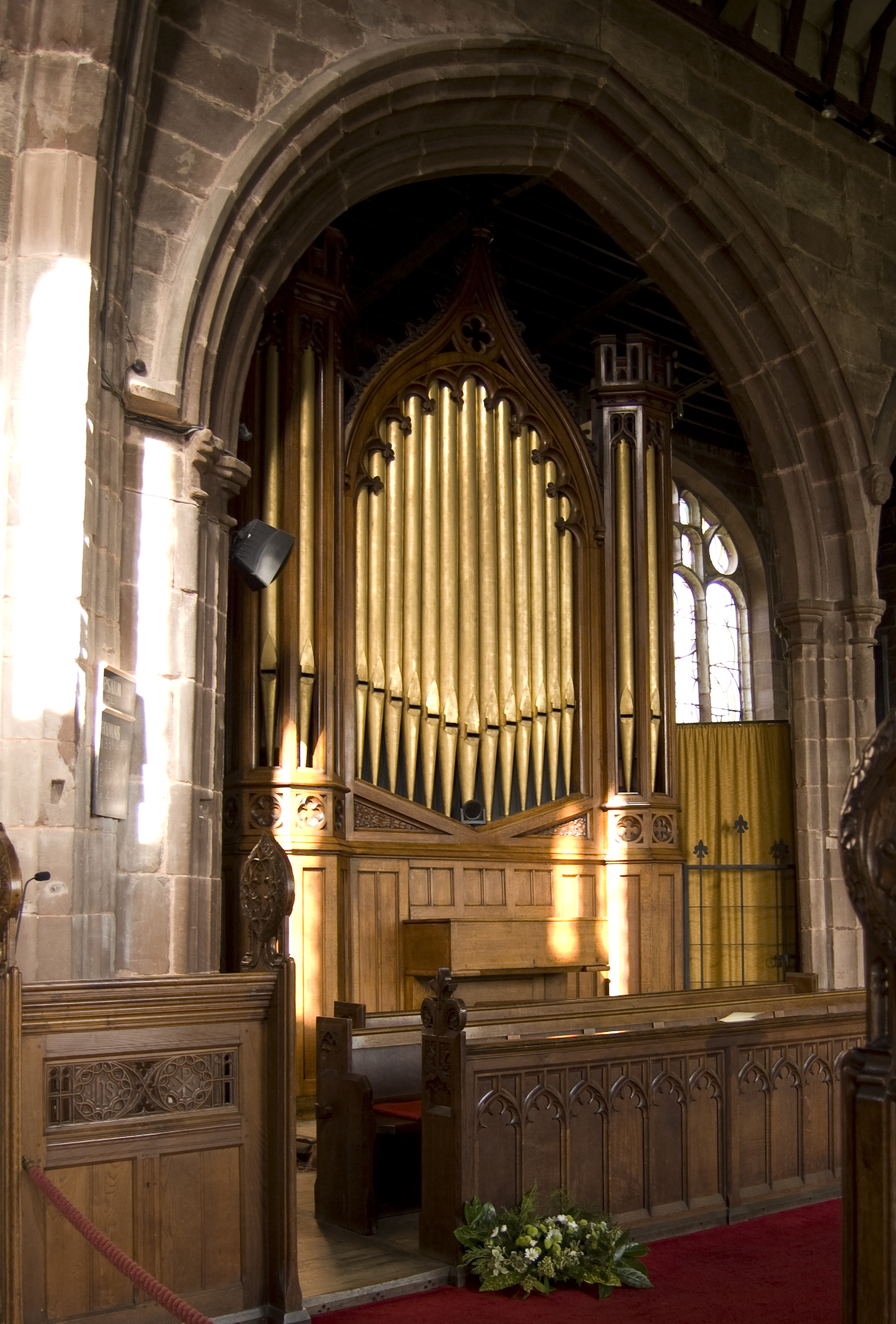
The organ at St. Mary and All Saints' Church, Great Budworth, a Samuel Renn instrument restored by Goetze and Gwynn

Dominic Gwynn started organ building with Hendrik ten Bruggencate in Northampton in 1976, before going into partnership with Martin Goetze in 1980. Initially located in Northampton, the company relocated in 1985 to the Welbeck Estate near Worksop in north Nottinghamshire. A third partner, Edward Bennett, joined in 1985.

Martin Goetze died on 23 August 2015. The company continued to restore and produce organs, but according to its website its focus shifted somewhat from the original directors' emphasis on re-creating the musical culture of the past. Dominic Gwynn died on 24 May 2024, aged 67.

== Reconstructions ==
The company has produced organs in Tudor style based on the remains of two Tudor organ soundboards discovered in Suffolk. Two of these instruments are managed by the Royal College of Organists.

== Restorations ==
Among the organs they have restored are:

- Great Budworth
  - The organ of St Mary and All Saints' Church, Great Budworth
- London
  - The organ of St Helen's Bishopsgate, which was damaged by a terrorist bomb attack in 1992
  - Handel's instrument at St Lawrence Whitchurch (1994)
- Wrexham
  - The Bevington organ at Erddig Hall (2016)
