= Belmont Hall, Cheshire =

Belmont Hall
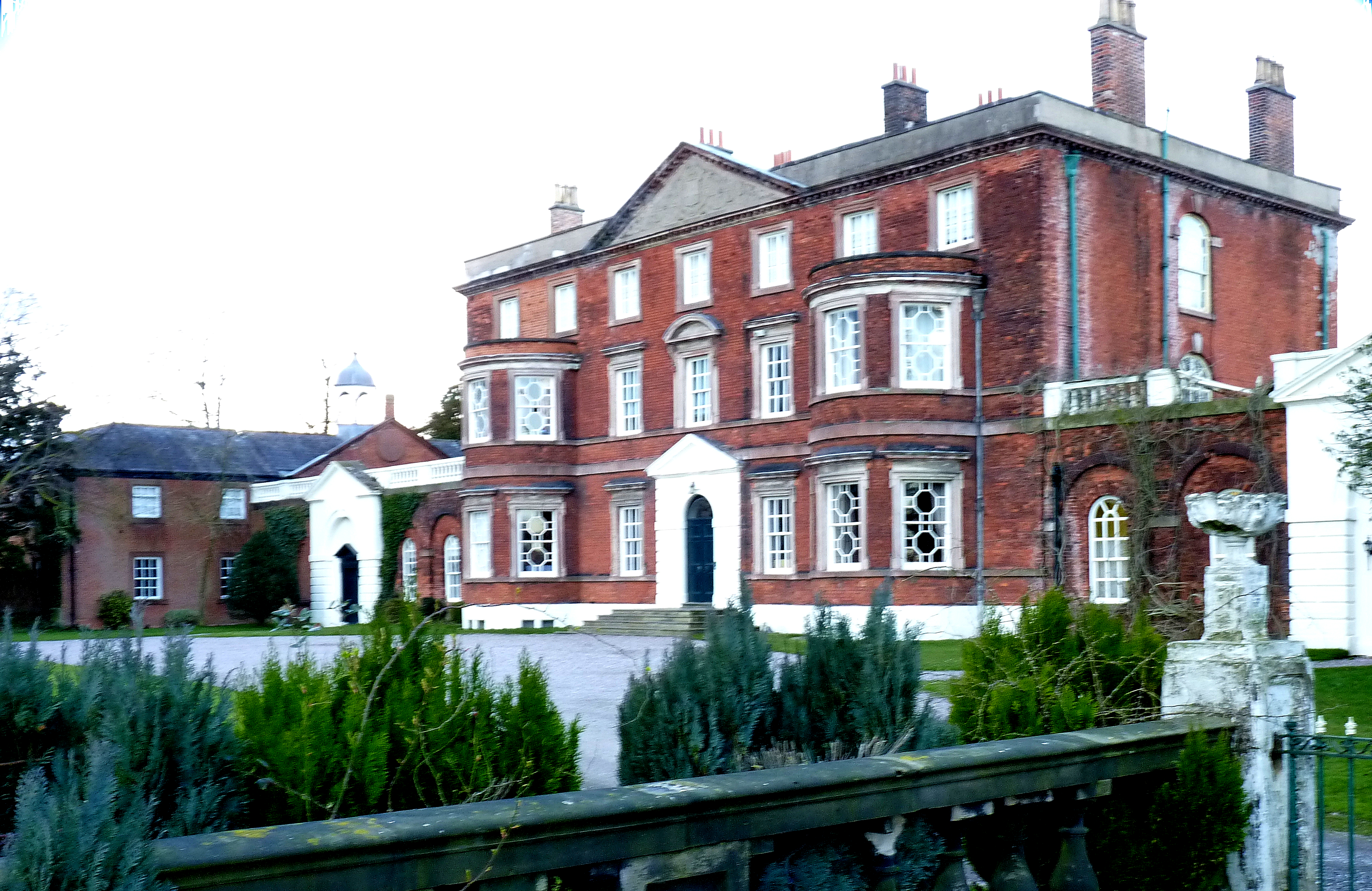

- Location in Cheshire
- 53.3011°N 2.5198°W
- OS grid reference: SJ 654 783

History
- Built: 1755
- Built for: John Smith Barry

Site notes
- Architect: James Gibbs

Listed Building – Grade I
- Official name: Belmont Hall
- Designated: 4 March 1969
- Reference no.: 1139129

Belmont Hall is a country house one mile (1.6 km) to the northwest of the village of Great Budworth, Cheshire, England. It is recorded in the National Heritage List for England as a designated Grade I listed building. The house stands to the north of the A559 road. Since 1977 it has been occupied by Cransley School.

== History ==
The area presently occupied by the Belmont Hall estate was granted to Norton Priory by Geoffrey Dutton in the 12th century and became a monastic grange, of which only the fishpond and moat have survived. In 1749 the land was bought by John Smith Barry, who commissioned James Gibbs to design a house for him, (Note: In describing the house, Gibbs wrote that he had "contrived a very Convenient Small house of six-room on the floor for the Honble John Smith Barry at Aston Park in Cheschire"[sic].) which was completed in 1755. Gibbs died in 1754, therefore the house's construction was probably supervised by a local architect. Some of the architectural features of the house are inconsistent with Gibbs' work elsewhere, and it is considered by de Figueiredo and Treuherz, and by Hartwell et al. that changes to the design, including the two-storey bow windows, were made by the executant architect. When John Smith Barry died in 1784 the house was inherited by his son James Hugh Smith Barry, an art collector. At his death in 1801 the house was sold to Henry Clarke, who sold it to the Leigh family. The estate remains in the ownership of the Leigh family; the house is let to Cransley School, and part of the surrounding land is used as a registered Camping and Caravanning Club site.

== Architecture ==
=== Exterior ===
Belmont Hall is constructed in brick with stone dressings on a stone plinth, and it has a slate hipped roof. It is designed along Palladian lines, with a central block of living rooms, separate side pavilions for offices, stables to the west and kitchens on the east. The central block has a symmetrical front, it is in three storeys, and has seven bays. The central doorway is flanked by rusticated stonework. It has a fanlight with a round arch, above which is a pediment. The lateral two wings have semicircular two-storey bay windows, which are in a different style from the rest of the house. The central pane of each window is octagonal. The other windows in the lower two storeys are 12-pane sashes, and those in the top storey are 12-pane casements. Around the top of the house is a moulded cornice, a plain parapet, and a central three-bay pediment containing the coat of arms of the Smith Barry family and their motto. The right pavilion is in two storeys and three bays with 12-pane sash windows. It has a pedimented gable facing the side of the house, and a hipped roof with a cupola. The left pavilion has been rebuilt in a simpler form. Each pavilion is joined to the house by a wing wall containing a central round-arched pedimented doorway and two 12-pane sash window, and is topped by a vase balustrade.

=== Interior ===
The ground floor originally contained six rooms; clockwise from the doorway they are the entrance hall, two drawing rooms, the staircase hall, the dining room, and a study or morning room. An extra room was added in the 19th century. The entrance hall is relatively plain, with a stone fireplace and pulvinated friezes over the doors. The study is panelled, and contains doorcases, a chimneypiece and an overmantel all of which are carved with flowers and fruit. The drawing rooms contain fine Rococo plasterwork on both ceilings, and on the walls and the chimneypiece of the front room. Hartwell et al. describe the plasterwork as being "quite sumptuous and exceptionally delicate". In the staircase hall is a panel between the windows containing a bust of Diana, with decorative plasterwork including festoons and hunting trophies. In the upper floor, the southwest room is decorated in Chinoiserie, including pagodas, trellises and birds. Both Hartwell et al. and de Figueiredo and Treuherz argue that the plasterwork must be by Francesco Vassilli, who had worked elsewhere with Gibbs.

== Surrounding buildings and grounds ==
In the grounds are a moat, a fishpond, kitchen garden and formal lawns. The moated site and the fishpond are designated as a scheduled monument. The two lodges at entrances to the drives are listed at Grade II. Both are constructed in brick with stone dressings and slate hipped roofs. Their fronts are symmetrical, with Tuscan porches, and 12-pane sash windows.

== See also ==
- Grade I listed non-ecclesiastical buildings in Cheshire
- Listed buildings in Great Budworth
