= Arley Green =

Hamlet in Cheshire, England

Coordinates: 53.31°N 02.48°W

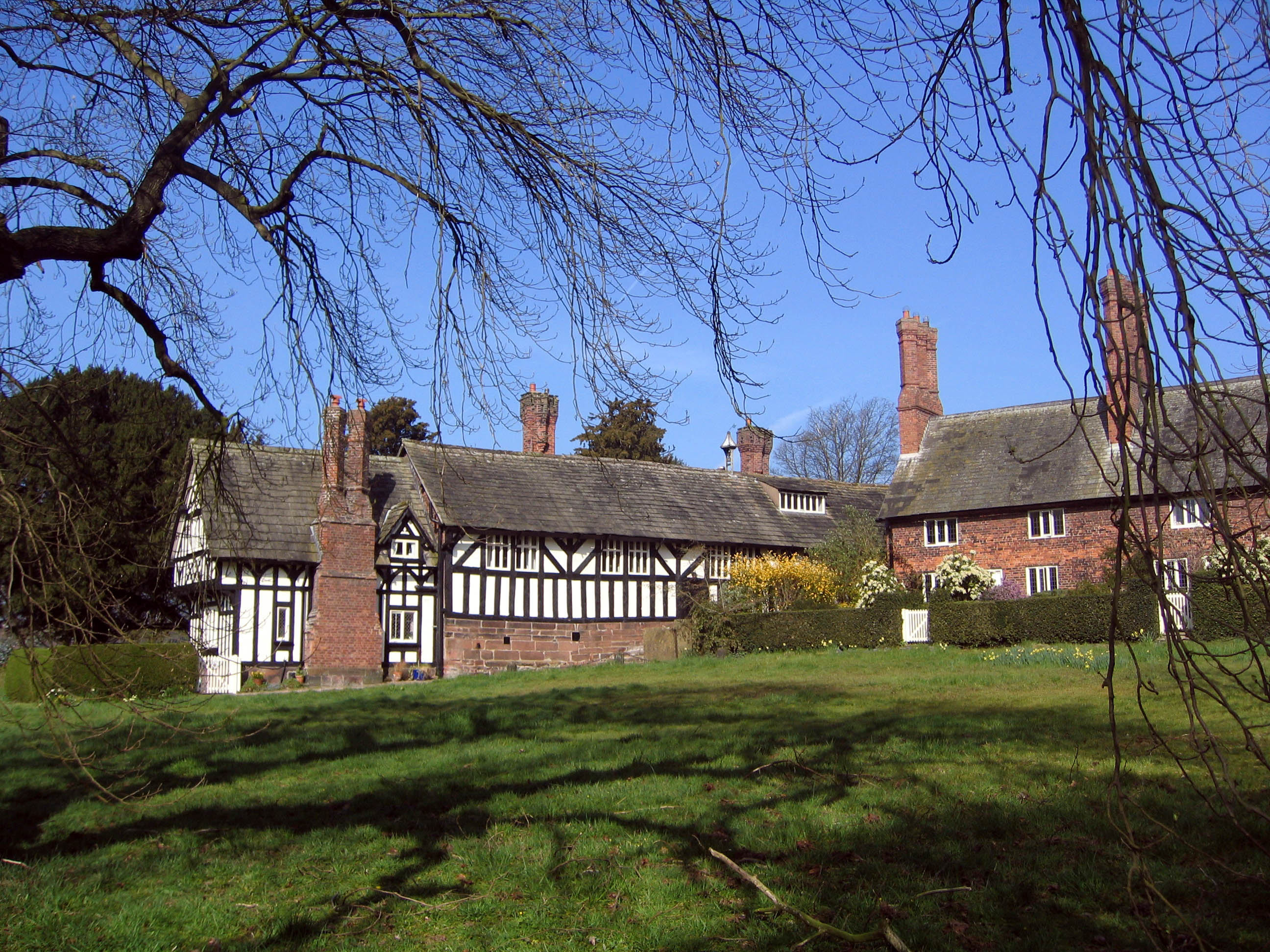

- Location within Cheshire
- OS grid reference: SJ6880
- Unitary authority: Cheshire East
- Ceremonial county: Cheshire
- Region: North West
- Country: England
- Sovereign state: United Kingdom
- Police: Cheshire
- Fire: Cheshire
- Ambulance: North West

Arley Green is a hamlet in Cheshire, England, within the parish of Aston By Budworth. The buildings originally formed Cowhouse Farm. Rowland Egerton-Warburton, the then owner of nearby Arley Hall, converted the half-timbered barn into a school in the 1830s and adapted another 18th-century building into a terrace of Tudor-style buildings. The farmhouse was converted into a parsonage. All three buildings are Grade II listed.
