= George and Dragon, Great Budworth =

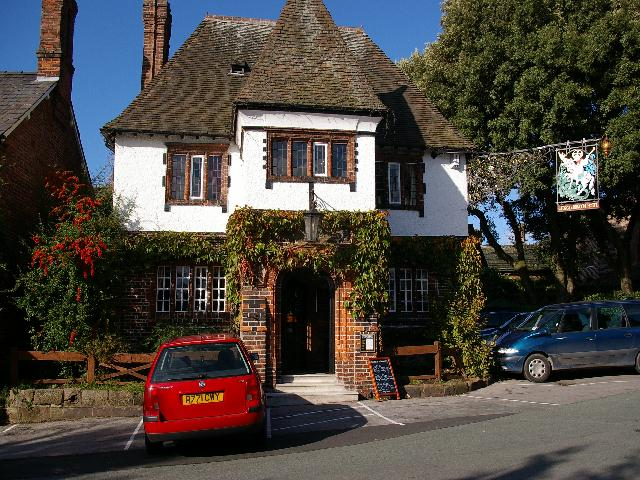
- George and Dragon, Great Budworth

- Location in Cheshire
- 53.2937°N 2.5051°W
- Location: Great Budworth, Cheshire, England
- OS grid reference: SJ 664 775

History
- Built: 17th century

Site notes
- Architect: John Douglas
- Restored: 1875
- Restored by: Rowland Egerton-Warburton

Listed Building – Grade II
- Designated: 27 August 1986
- Reference no.: 1329885

The George and Dragon is a public house in the village of Great Budworth, Cheshire, England. It is recorded in the National Heritage List for England as a designated Grade II listed building.

== History ==
Great Budworth is a village that was formerly in the estate of Arley Hall. In the later part of the 19th century, its owner, Rowland Egerton-Warburton, undertook a "campaign to restore the village and render it picturesque in Victorian eyes". The George and Dragon was at that time a simple three-bay Georgian inn. In 1875 Egerton-Warburton commissioned the Chester architect John Douglas to undertake the restoration. Douglas added tall rubbed chimneys, mullioned windows and a steep pyramidal turret.

== Architecture ==
The inn has three bays and is in two storeys. It is built in brick with a roughcast rendering on the upper storey. The roofs are hipped and covered in clay tiles. The central bay consists of a two-storey porch which projects forwards. Its lower storey has an elliptical-headed doorway, and in the upper storey is a four-light mullioned window. Each lateral bay has a four-light mullioned window in the lower storey and a three-light mullioned window in the upper storey. A tall rubbed brick chimneystack rises from the left side of the roof. Diagonally from the right corner is the inn sign. The cut-out pictorial sign itself originated in Nuremberg while its ornate wrought iron bracket was made by the estate blacksmith. On each side of the porch is an oak post-and-rail fence inscribed with a number of sayings. Above the inner door is a stone containing a verse written by Egerton-Warburton. Internally, in the bar, is a stone inscribed in Latin and the date 1722.

== Present day ==
The George and Dragon continues to trade as a public house and restaurant.

== See also ==
- Listed buildings in Great Budworth
- List of non-ecclesiastical and non-residential works by John Douglas
