= Great Budworth =

Village in Cheshire, England

Coordinates: 53.294°N 2.505°W

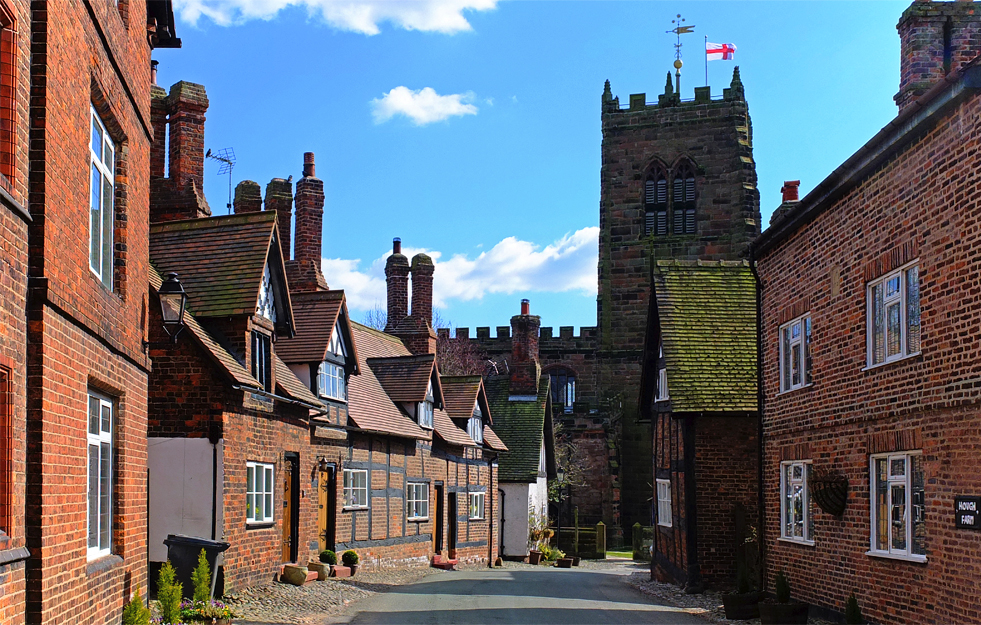
- Church Street, looking towards St Mary and All Saints Church

- Location within Cheshire
- Population: 302 (Parish, 2021)
- OS grid reference: SJ6677
- Civil parish: Great Budworth
- Unitary authority: Cheshire West and Chester
- Ceremonial county: Cheshire
- Region: North West
- Country: England
- Sovereign state: United Kingdom
- Post town: NORTHWICH
- Postcode district: CW9
- Dialling code: 01606
- Police: Cheshire
- Fire: Cheshire
- Ambulance: North West

Great Budworth is a village and civil parish in Cheshire, England, four miles (6.4 km) north of Northwich off the A559 road, east of Comberbach, northwest of Higher Marston and southeast of Budworth Heath. Until 1948, Great Budworth was part of the Arley Hall estate. At the 2021 census, the population of the parish was 302.

== Toponymy ==
According to Sir Peter Leycester, the name Great Budworth comes from the Old Saxon words bode ("dwelling") and wurth ("a place by water").

== History ==
The early history of Great Budworth is documented in the Domesday Book of 1086, which mentions a priest at Great Budworth. In 1130, St Mary and All Saints Church was given to the Augustinian canon of Norton Priory by William FitzNigel, Constable of Chester and Baron of Halton.

The lord of the manor during the reign of Henry III was Geoffrey de Dutton. He donated to Norton Priory a third of his land to endow masses for his soul. After the dissolution of the monasteries, King Henry VIII granted the estate to John Grimsditch. It was afterwards divided into several parcels.

There may have been a school in Great Budworth as early as 1563, but certainly one existed by 1578. For centuries, the village was owned by the head of Arley Hall who would collect rent from the villagers. Rowland Egerton-Warburton of Arley Hall paid for restorations and improvements to the church in the 1850s. Egerton-Warburton also undertook a "campaign to render it (the village) picturesque in Victorian eyes". To this end he commissioned architects including William Nesfield and John Douglas to work on buildings in the village. Douglas remodelled the George and Dragon inn in 1875, and restored some of the cottages.

A running pump was the only source of drinking water for the whole community until 1934 when a piped supply was first connected. Until 1948, Great Budworth was part of the Arley Hall estate.

== Governance ==
There are two tiers of local government covering Great Budworth, at civil parish (town) and unitary authority level: Great Budworth Parish Council and Cheshire West and Chester Council. The parish council meets at the Parish Hall on Smithy Lane.

=== Administrative history ===
Great Budworth was an ancient parish. It was 15 miles (24 km) in length, and by land area it was the second largest parish in Cheshire, after Prestbury. The parish straddled the hundreds of Bucklow, Eddisbury and Northwich. It was subdivided into 35 townships:

- Allostock
- Anderton
- Antrobus
- Appleton
- Aston by Budworth
- Barnton
- Bartington
- Birches
- Castle Northwich
- Cogshall
- Comberbach
- Crowley
- Dutton (Note: Part, rest of township in Runcorn parish)
- Great Budworth
- Hartford (Note: Part, township also included three detached parcels of Weaverham parish)
- Higher Whitley
- Hulse
- Lach Dennis
- Little Leigh
- Lostock Gralam
- Lower Whitley
- Marbury
- Marston
- Nether Peover
- Northwich
- Peover Inferior
- Pickmere
- Plumley
- Rudheath (Note: Part, remainder of township split between Davenham and Sandbach parishes)
- Seven Oaks
- Stretton
- Tabley Inferior
- Wincham
- Winnington
- Witton cum Twambrooks

Several of the townships had chapels of ease, a notable example being St Helen's Church at Witton, built in the 14th century to serve the southern townships of Great Budworth parish, including Northwich.

From the 17th century onwards, parishes were gradually given various civil functions under the poor laws, in addition to their original ecclesiastical functions. In some cases, including Great Budworth, the civil functions were exercised by each township separately rather than the parish as a whole. In 1866, the legal definition of 'parish' was changed to be the areas used for administering the poor laws, and so the townships also became civil parishes.

== Geography ==
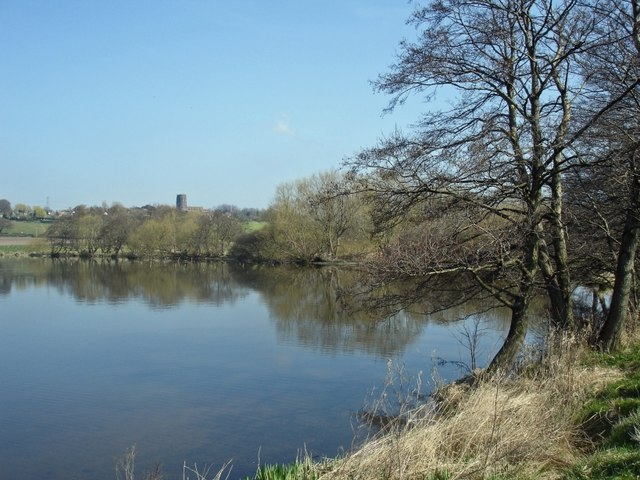
Budworth Mere with Great Budworth church in the distance

Great Budworth is approached from the main Warrington to Northwich road about two miles (3.2 km) from Northwich, along a ridge overlooking two meres, Budworth to the west and Pickmere to the east.

=== Flora and fauna ===
In the Middle Ages, Budworth Mere was used as a fish hatchery. Stocked with bream and pike, its reeds shelter breeding reed warblers and great crested grebes. Other avifauna includes mallards and coots.

== Landmarks ==
The Grade I listed St Mary and All Saints Church is in the village. Arley Hall, a historic house, is nearby. Also of note in the area are the George and Dragon and Cock o' Budworth public houses, 54–57 High Street, Dene Cottages, Goldmine House and Belmont Hall.

=== St Mary and All Saints' Church ===
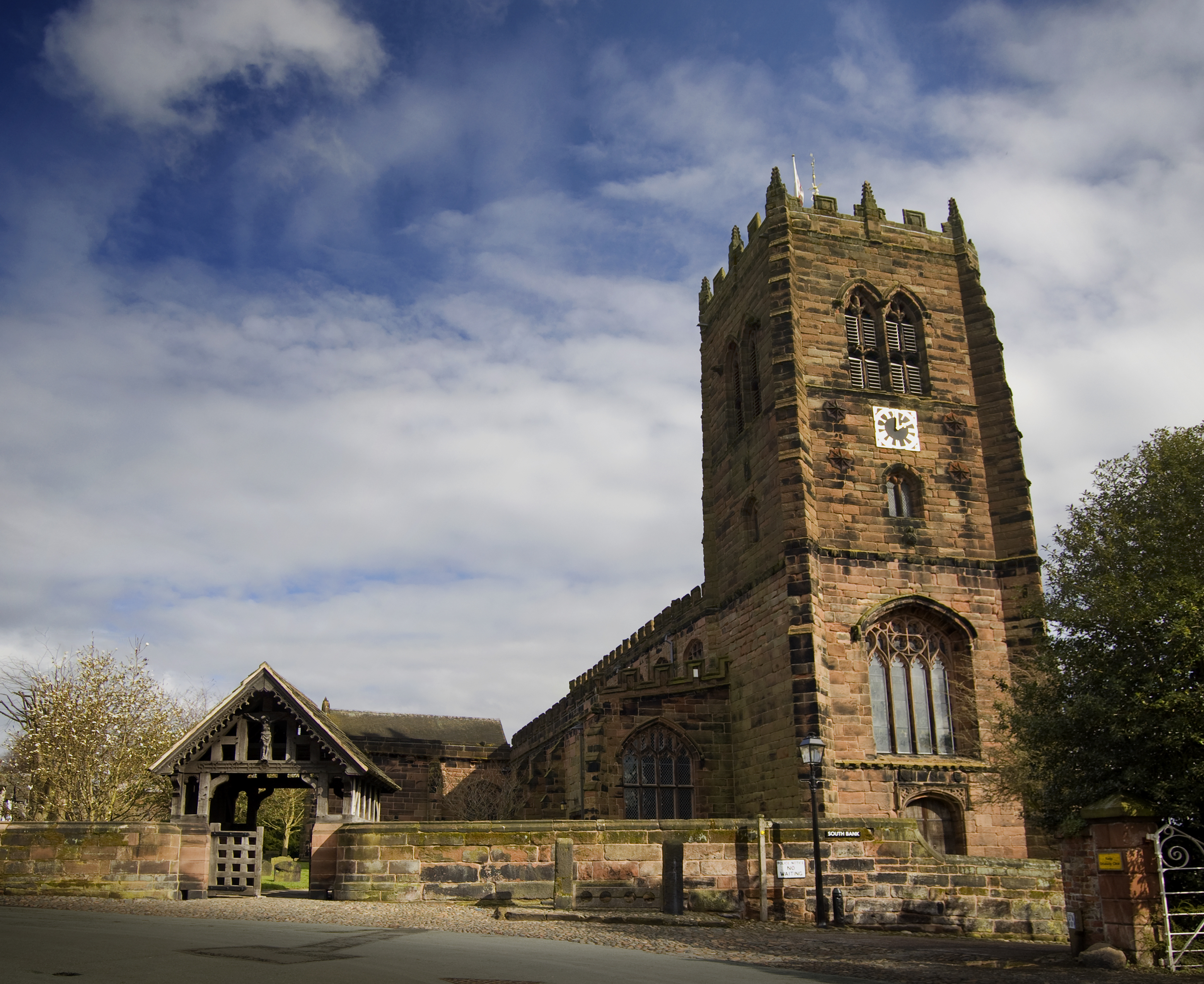
St Mary and All Saints Church

St Mary and All Saints' Church is recorded in the National Heritage List for England as a designated Grade I listed building. It is an active Anglican parish church in the diocese of Chester, the archdeaconry of Chester and the deanery of Great Budworth. Clifton-Taylor includes it in his list of best English parish churches. Richards describes it as "one of the finest examples of ecclesiastical architecture remaining in Cheshire". The architectural historian Nikolaus Pevsner considered it to be "one of the most satisfactory Perpendicular churches in Cheshire". In the north chapel is a memorial to Sir Peter Leicester, the 17th-century historian, and in the Warburton Chapel is the alabaster effigy of Sir John Warburton who died in 1575. In the north chapel is an organ designed by Samuel Renn, installed in 1839.

=== Houses ===
Goldmine House and its attached cottage (Rose Cottage), designated as a Grade II listed building, were built in 1870 for Rowland Egerton-Warburton of Arley Hall and were designed by the Chester architect John Douglas. Built with brown brick with some timber framing, and clay tile roofs the house faces west. It is a double storied building with two gabled bays. The cottage is simple in form with a dormer and blue brick diapering.

Dene Cottages, a Grade II listed pair of cottages, were built in 1867–68, again for Rowland Egerton-Warburton and by Douglas. The lower storeys are constructed in brown brick. The upper storeys are timber-framed with plaster panels. The roof is in clay tiles. The plaster panels are pargetted with floral motifs.

Belmont Hall in this parish was built by J. H. Smith-Barry Esq., who deposited in it his valuable collection of pictures and statues, afterwards removed to Marbury. Smith-Barry sold it to Henry Clarke. Built in 1755 and designed by James Gibbs, it is a Grade I listed building. As of 2020 it is occupied by Cransley School.

=== George and Dragon pub ===
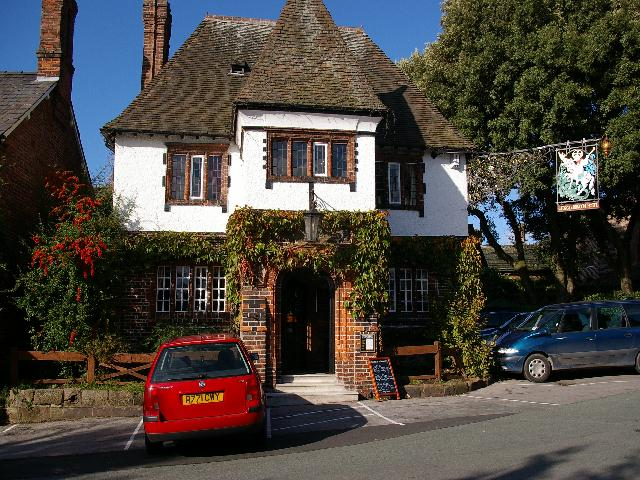
The George and Dragon pub

The George and Dragon pub, another Grade II listed building, was initially built as a simple three-bay Georgian inn. In 1875, John Douglas was commissioned to restore it by Egerton-Warburton. He added tall rubbed chimneys, mullioned windows and a steep pyramidal turret. The double-storied inn has bays built in brick with a roughcast rendering on the upper storey. It has clay tiled covered hipped roofs. Its other architectural features comprise a projecting two-storey porch with oak post-and-rail fence inscribed with a number of sayings on either side, lateral bay with four-light mullioned window in the lower storey and a three-light mullioned window in the upper storey, a tall rubbed brick chimneystack, and the inn sign located diagonally from the right corner. The inn continues to function as a public house and restaurant. In 2015 the pub was used as a location in the video game Contradiction by developer Baggy Cat.

=== 54–57 High Street ===
54–57 High Street is a row of four Grade II listed dwellings in the High Street, built in the early 18th century. They were refaced and partly rebuilt for Rowland Egerton-Warburton of Arley Hall by John Douglas in 1870 or 1875. The two outer buildings are houses and the two central buildings are cottages. They are built in brown brick with clay tile roofs, and have two storeys plus attics. Each building has a gable, those on the outer buildings larger than those on the inner, all decorated with brick and plaster.

== Culture ==
The Soul Cakers Play is a seasonal folk play performed in the village every November which brings together the whole community. It features Saint George, the Black Knight and a Hobby Horse. In Great Budworth, the "soul cake" may be a glass of beer or other sustenance; into it comes the devil, or Beelzebub, now "Belshy Bob". The village is a popular location for films and television including Cluedo, and more recently a NatWest advert and the 2019 BBC drama War of the Worlds.

== See also ==
- Listed buildings in Great Budworth
