= Cransley School =

Location
- Belmont Hall; Great Budworth, Cheshire, CW9 6HN; England; 53.3021°N 2.5118°W

Information
- Type: Mixed Independent
- Established: 1934
- Headmaster: Richard Pollock LLB PGCE PGDip (RNCM)
- Enrolment: c. 210
- Website: http://cransleyschool.com/

Cransley School is an independent day school in Great Budworth, close to the town of Northwich, Cheshire, England. The school educates girls and boys aged 4–16. The headmaster since 2016 is Mr Richard Pollock.

The school regularly reaches the top of local performance tables (Cheshire) at GCSE level.

The recent Educational Quality Inspection by ISI (May 2019) reported that its pupils’ Personal outcomes were Excellent, Academic provision was Good and that the School was compliant against all Independent School Standards.

The school is non-denominational and welcomes all faiths and cultures. Traditional Christian values are observed.

== History ==
Cransley School was founded in Bowdon in the 1930s as a girls' preparatory school. It moved to its current location, Belmont Hall, in 1977. The school is set in parkland and surrounded by mature woodland. Cransley School first started educating boys at primary level in the 1980s.

The school's gym was opened in 1983 by the Duke of Westminster.

In September 2014, Cransley School began accepting boys into the Senior School. The school now teaches boys and girls aged 4–16.

== Reputation ==
In the last decade the school achieved over 90% per cent pass rate at five or more grades A* to C. Cransley School is currently ranked in the top five secondary schools in Cheshire West and Chester for GCSE results, and in the top three for English Baccalaureate results.

== Activities ==
Extra-curricular activities include dance, drama and music to rowing, rugby and judo. The school focuses on hockey, netball, football and rugby in the autumn and spring terms, and tennis and athletics in the summer term. The school aims to allow children access to individual sports such as golf, cross country and rowing.
