= St Mary and All Saints' Church, Great Budworth =

Coordinates: 53.2936°N 2.5043°W

St Mary and All Saints Church, Great Budworth
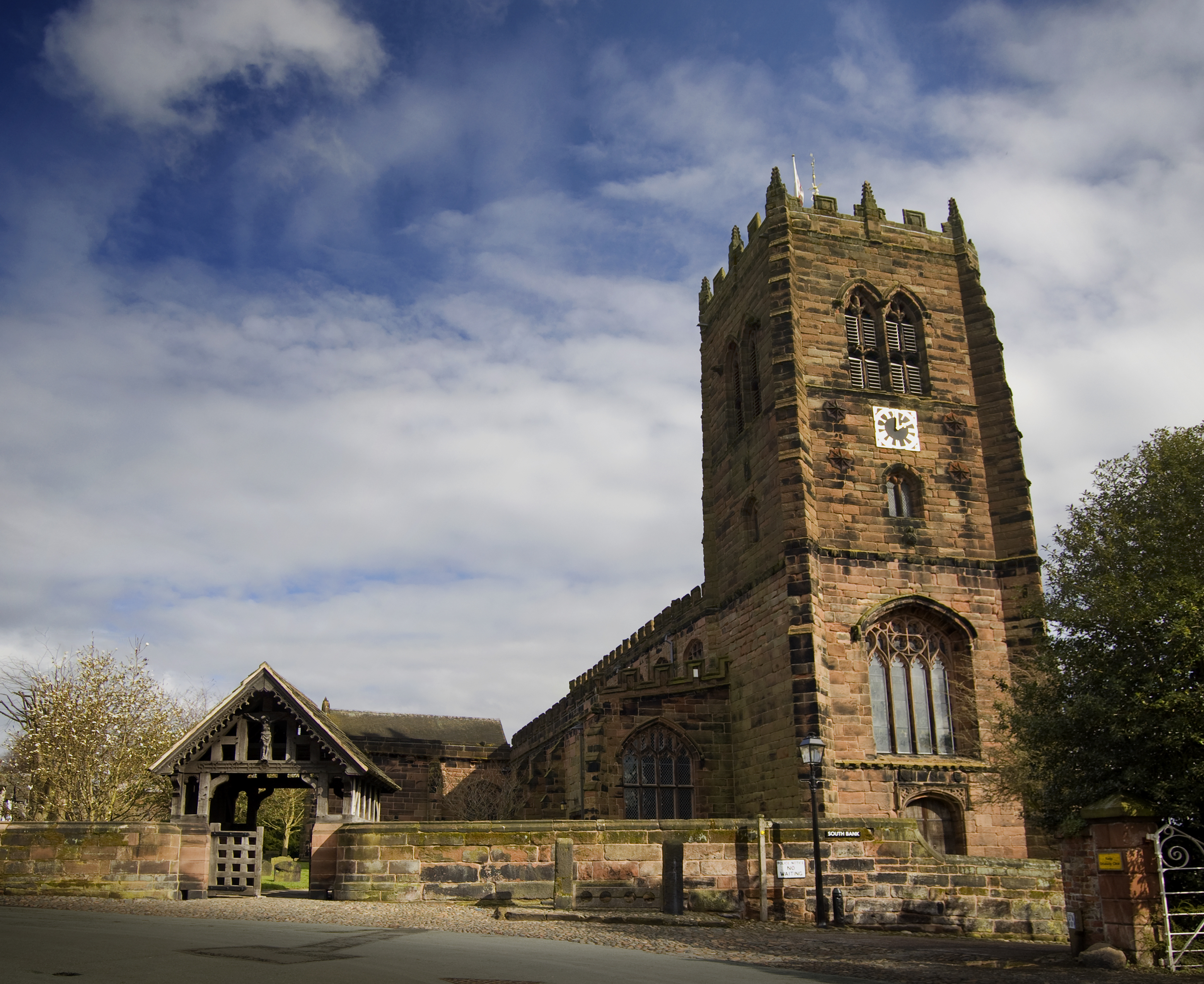
- View of St Mary and All Saints’ Church, Great Budworth, showing the church, lychgate and stocks

- Location in Cheshire
- OS grid reference: SJ 663 775
- Location: Great Budworth, Cheshire
- Country: England
- Denomination: Anglican
- Website: St Mary and All Saints

History
- Status: Parish church

Architecture
- Functional status: Active
- Heritage designation: Grade I
- Architect(s): Anthony Salvin; William Butterfield
- Architectural type: Church
- Style: Perpendicular

Specifications
- Length: 121 feet (37 m)
- Width: 52 feet (16 m)
- Materials: Red sandstone

Administration
- Province: York
- Diocese: Chester
- Archdeaconry: Chester
- Deanery: Great Budworth
- Parish: Great Budworth

Clergy
- Vicar: Rev Alec Brown

St Mary and All Saints Church is in the centre of the village of Great Budworth, Cheshire, England. It is an active Anglican parish church in the diocese of Chester, the archdeaconry of Chester and the deanery of Great Budworth. The church is recorded in the National Heritage List for England as a designated Grade I listed building. Clifton-Taylor includes it in his list of 'best' English parish churches. Richards describes it as "one of the finest examples of ecclesiastical architecture remaining in Cheshire". The authors of the Buildings of England series express the opinion that it is "one of the most satisfactory Perpendicular churches of Cheshire and its setting brings its qualities out to perfection".

== History ==
In the Domesday Book of 1086 there is a reference to a priest at Great Budworth. The church and its living were given to the Augustinian canons of Norton Priory by William FitzNigel, Constable of Chester and Baron of Halton in 1130. Geoffrey de Dutton was an early benefactor of the church, as later were the Booths of Twemlow. The oldest part of the present church, the Lady Chapel, dates from the 14th century; the rest of the church from the 15th and 16th centuries. Rowland Egerton-Warburton of Arley Hall paid for a restoration of the church in the 1850s.

== Architecture ==
=== Exterior ===
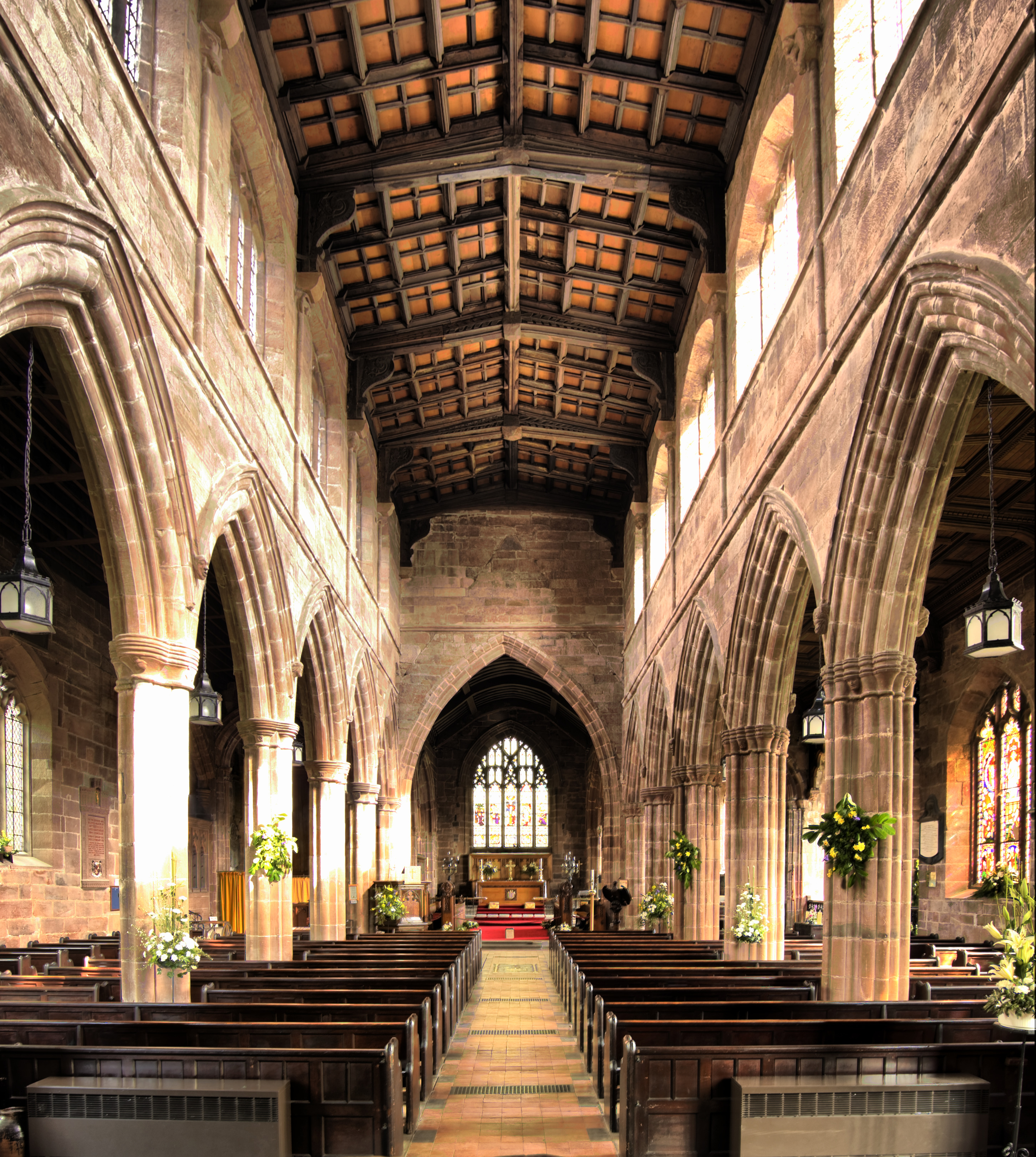
Nave looking towards the Chancel from the Font and belltower

It is an impressive church, built generally in the Perpendicular style although the long, and older north transept is constructed in the Decorated style. Built in red sandstone, its plan consists of a west tower, a six-bay nave with a clerestory, north and south aisles, and a chancel flanked by chapels to the north and south. The north transept forms the Lady Chapel and the shorter south transept is the Warburton Chapel. At the west end of the south aisle is the south porch. The entire church is crenellated. On the north side of the tower is a sculpture of Saint Christopher and on the south side one of the Blessed Virgin. It has diagonal buttresses and an octagonal south-west turret, a Tudor-arched west window, small arched ringers' windows on the north, west and south faces, a clock on west face, and two-light belfry windows with stone louvres. Its top is crenellated with eight crocketed pinnacles.

=== Interior ===
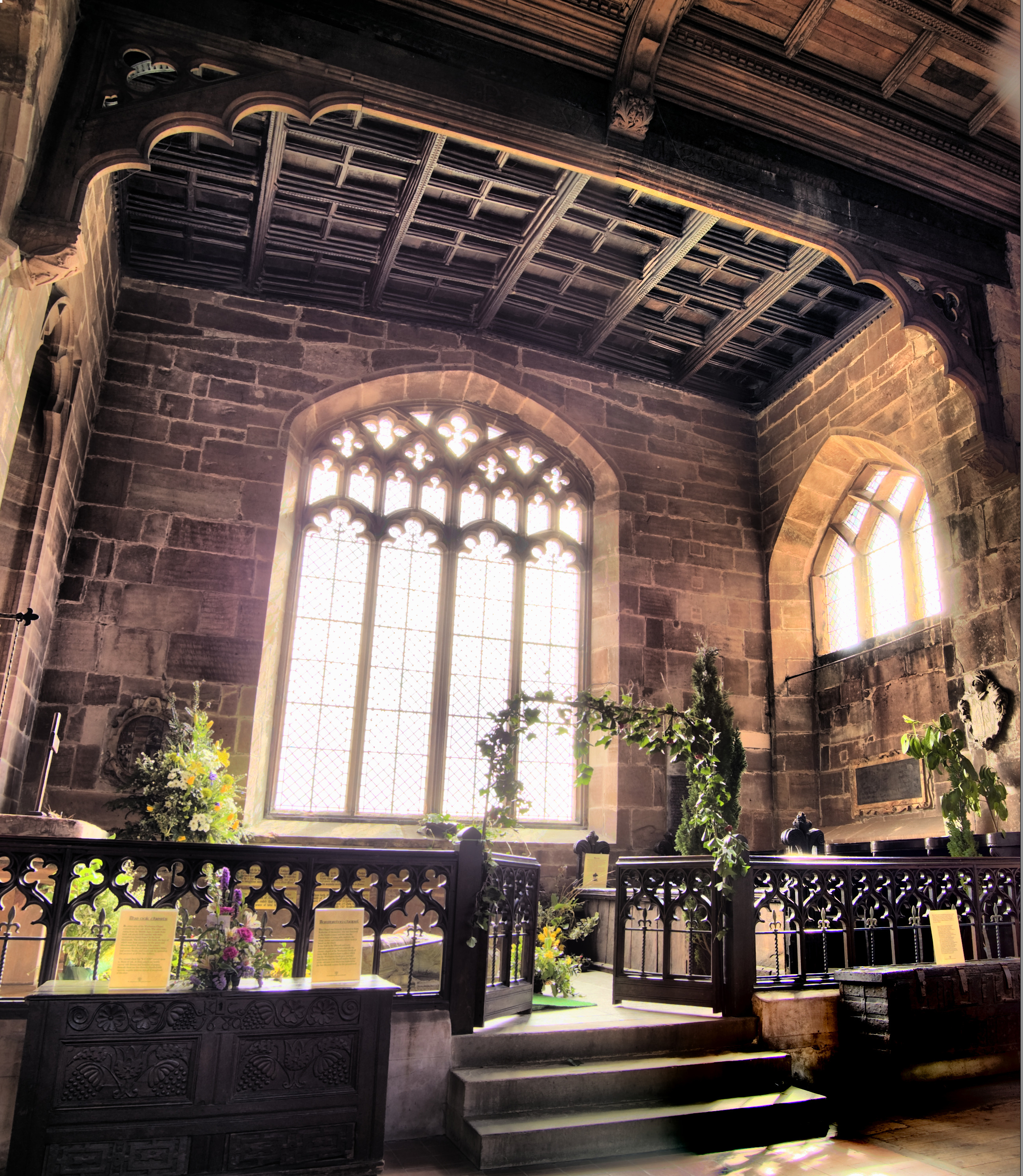
Warburton Chapel

The nave ceiling dates from the first quarter of the 16th century and is subdivided into 72 panels. In the Warburton Chapel are five oak stalls dating probably from the 13th century and considered to be the earliest in Cheshire. Two old chests are in the church, the older one being medieval and the other dated 1680. The octagonal font dates from the 15th century. In the sanctuary are two Jacobean chairs. The screen to the north transept is by Anthony Salvin. The stained glass in the east window and in the east windows of both aisles is by Kempe, and is dated between 1883 and 1901. In the north transept is Expressionist glass by Pierre Fourmaintraux dated 1965.

In the north chapel is a memorial to Sir Peter Leicester, the 17th-century historian, and in the Warburton Chapel is the alabaster effigy of Sir John Warburton who died in 1575. In the north chapel is an organ which was designed by Samuel Renn and installed in 1839. It is recognised by the British Institute of Organ Studies as being an "Organ of Historic Importance". The organ was restored in 2004 by Goetze and Gwynn at a cost of £60,000. There is a ring of eight bells, all cast by Rudhall of Gloucester. Six of these are dated 1733, one is dated 1760 and the other 1822. The parish registers begin in 1559 and the churchwardens' accounts date back to 1699.

== External features ==
In and near to the churchyard are four structures that are listed at Grade II. The churchyard wall of sandstone and brick dates partly from the late medieval period with additions made in the 18th and 19th centuries. It incorporates a water trough. The lychgate to the churchyard was erected in 1920 as a war memorial to the First World War. It is oak-framed on a sandstone plinth, with an oak crucifix on the front gable. In the churchyard is a stone sundial from the late 18th century consisting of a vase baluster on a round step sitting on a square flagstone base with a copper dial and gnomon. Just outside the churchyard wall are stocks probably dating from the early 18th century. The churchyard also contains the war graves of six British servicemen, four of World War I and two of World War II.

== Gallery ==
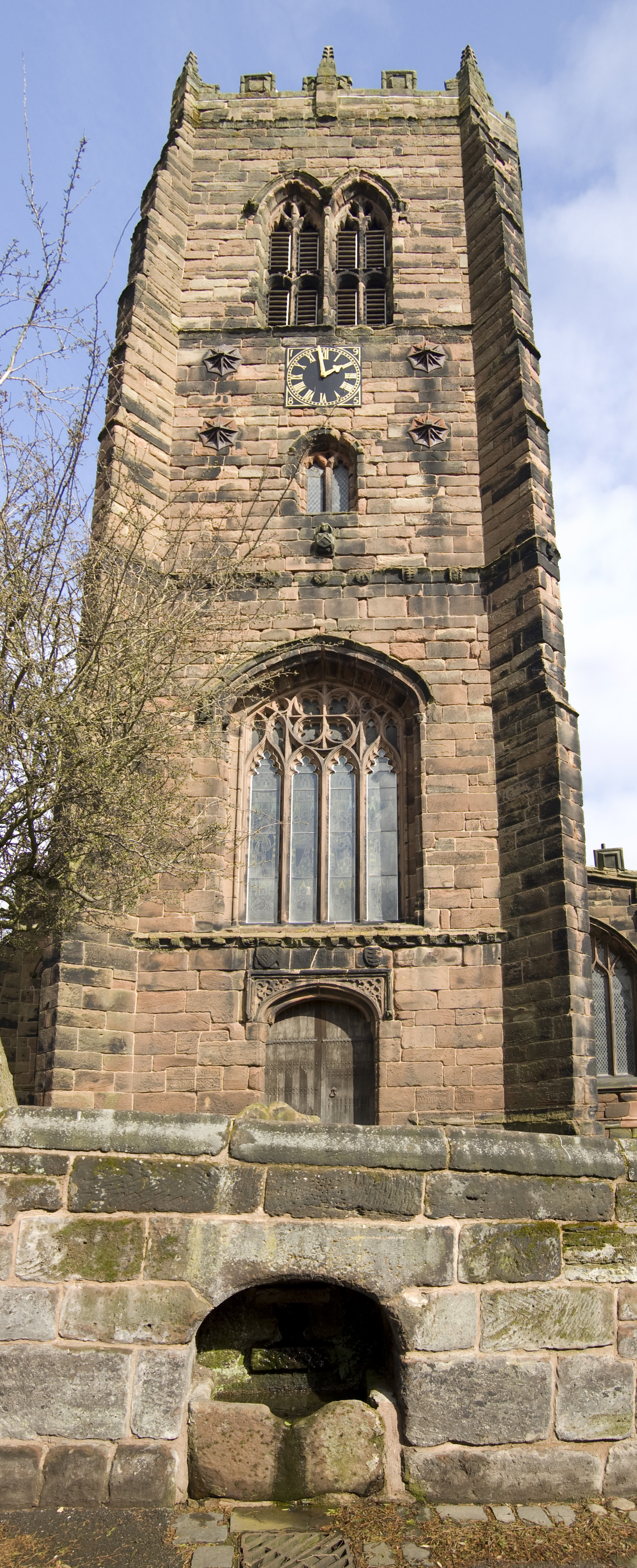
Tower from the west showing the water trough built into the wall, the clock and the louvred bell tower

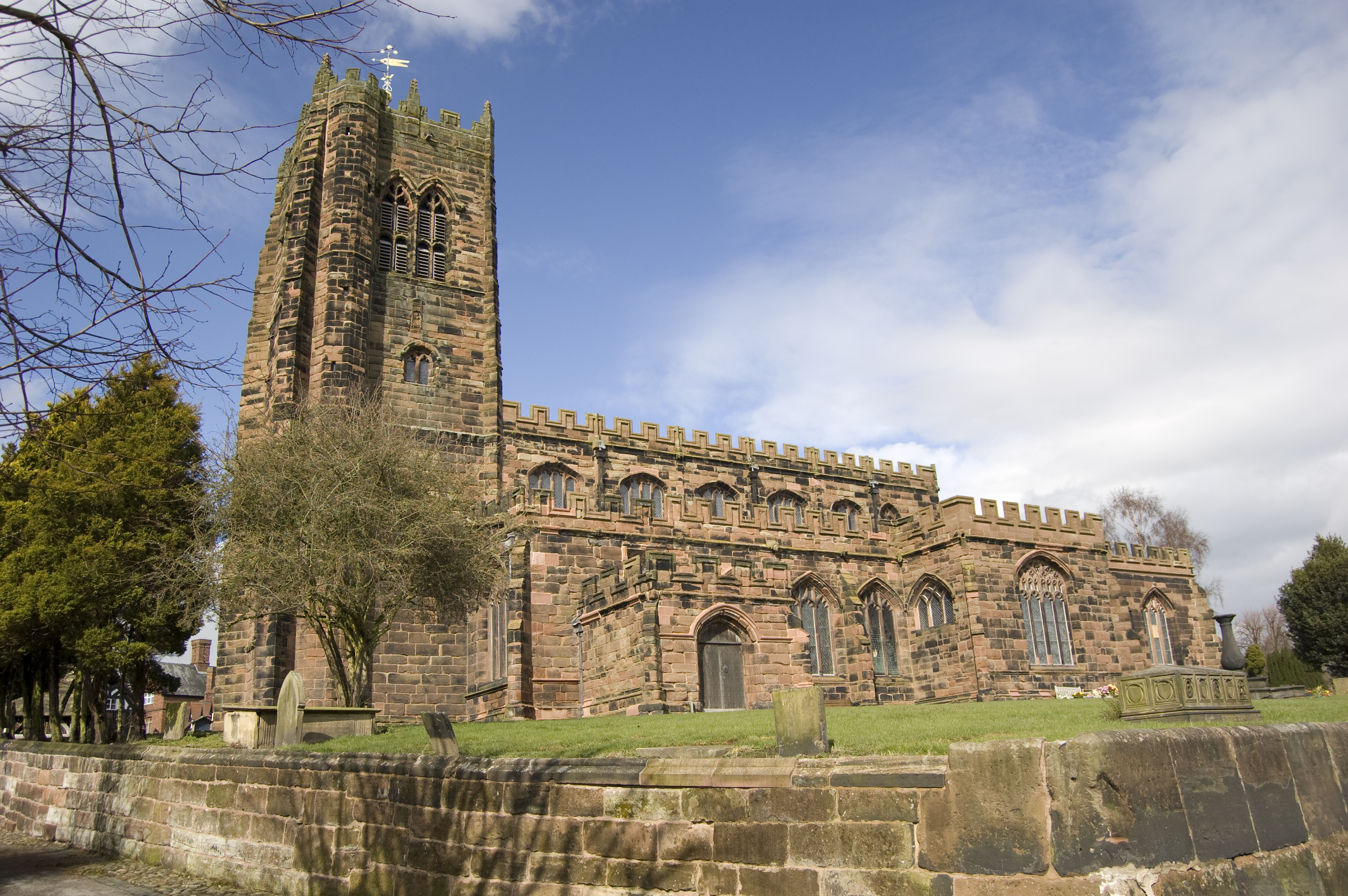
Exterior from the south showing the octagonal tower

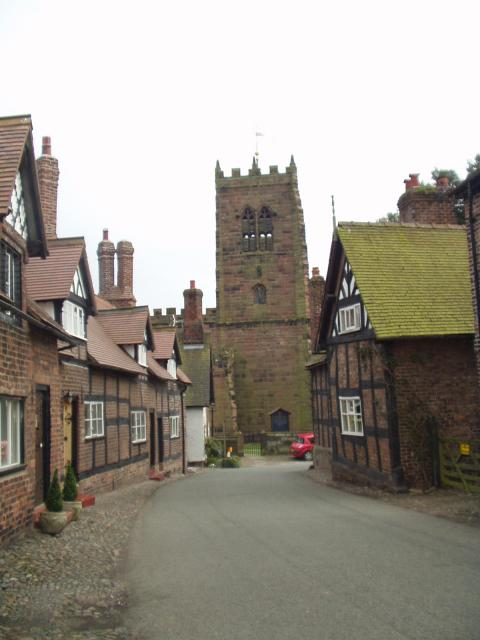
Exterior from the north

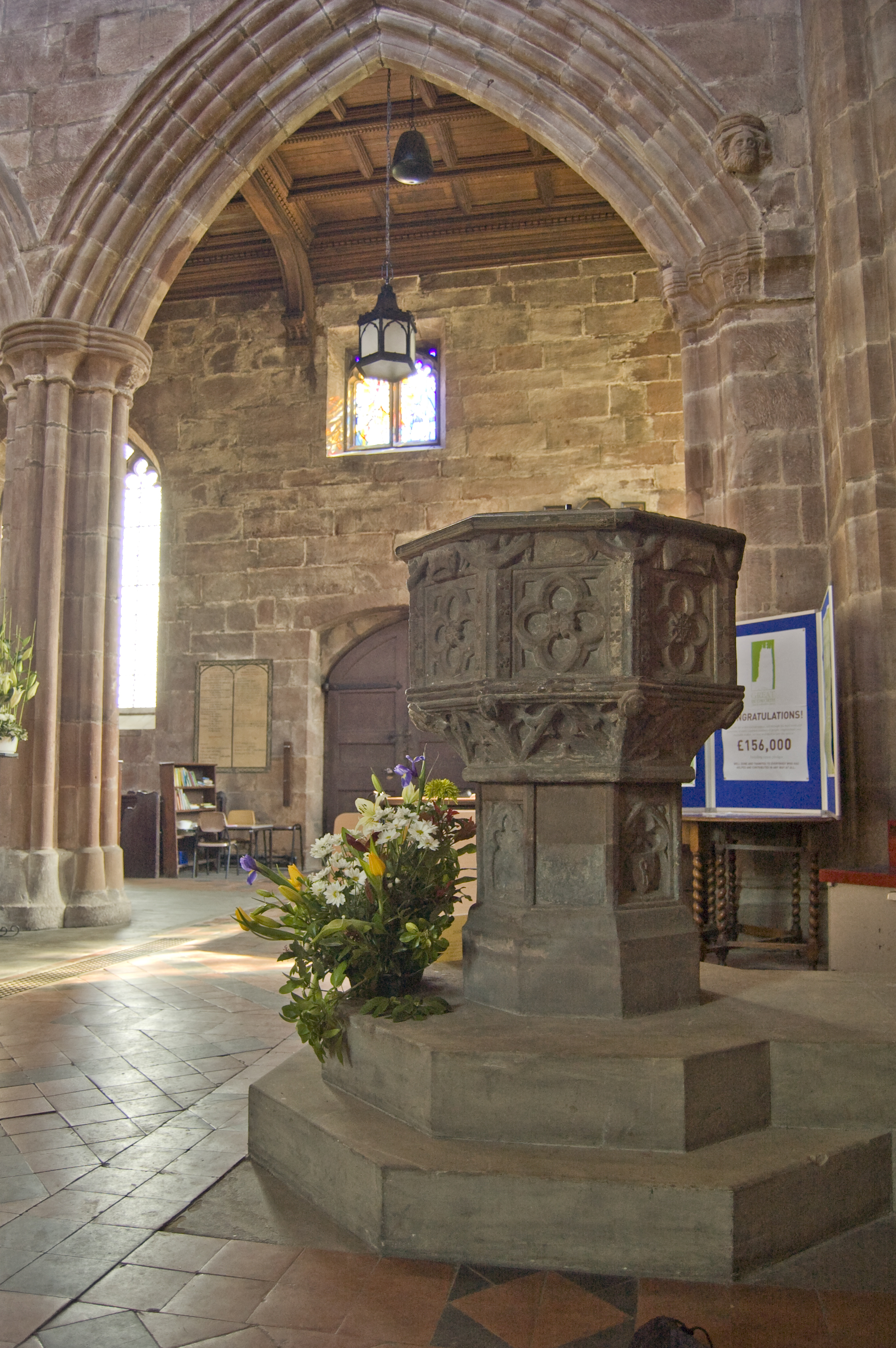
Baptismal font looking towards the south porch and aisle

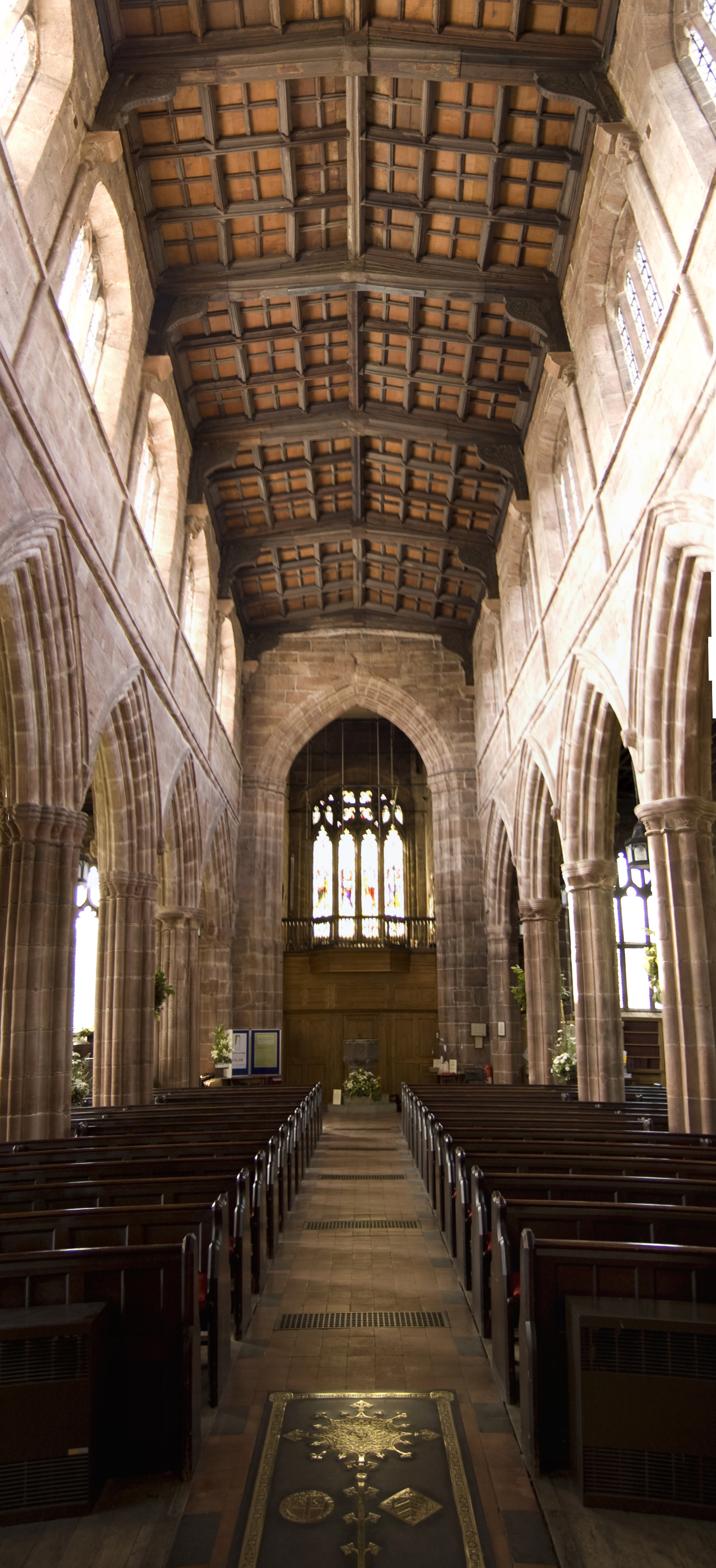
Nave looking from the chancel to the belltower and font

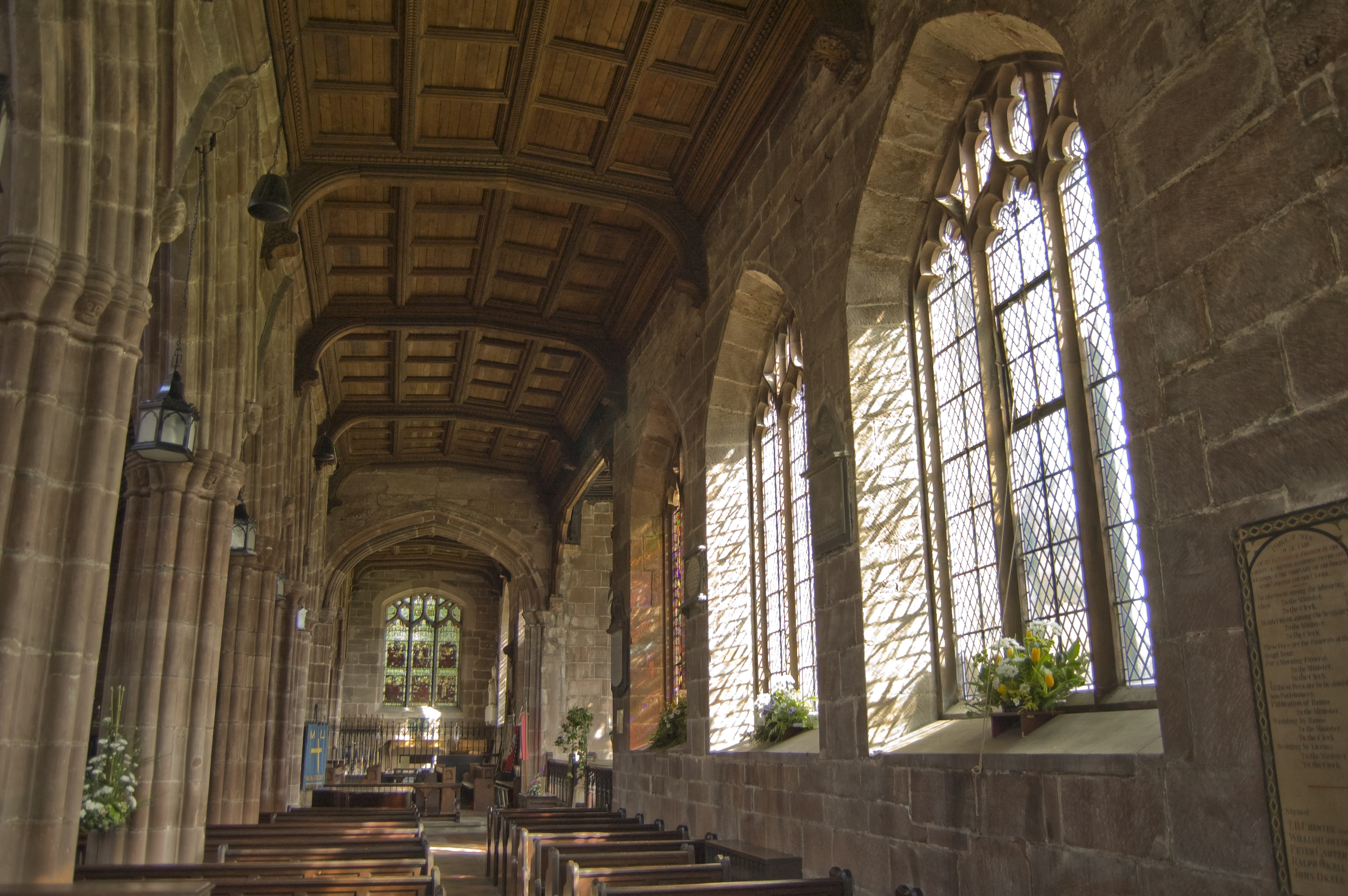
South aisle looking towards the Warburton Chapel (concealed on the right)

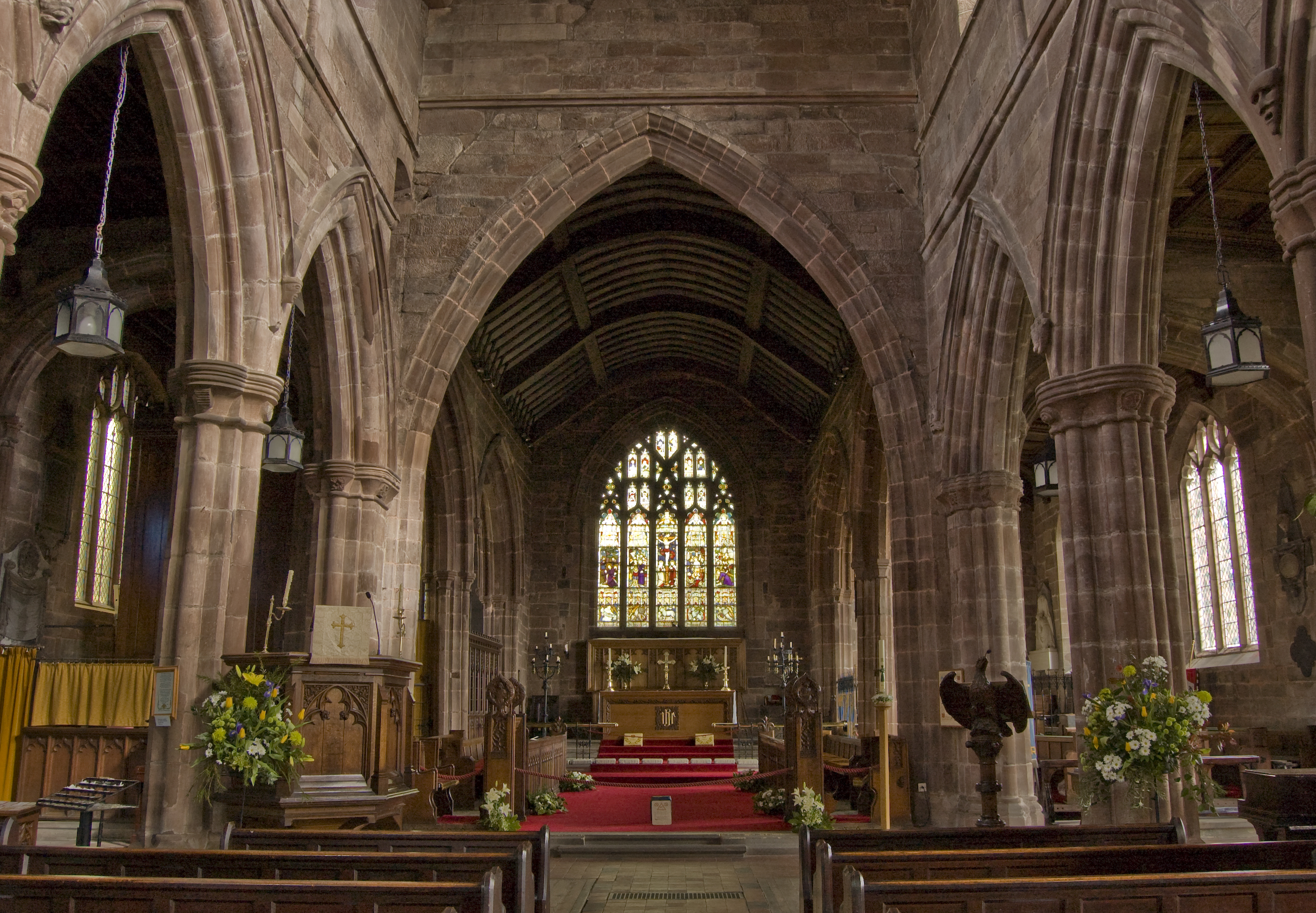
The Chancel

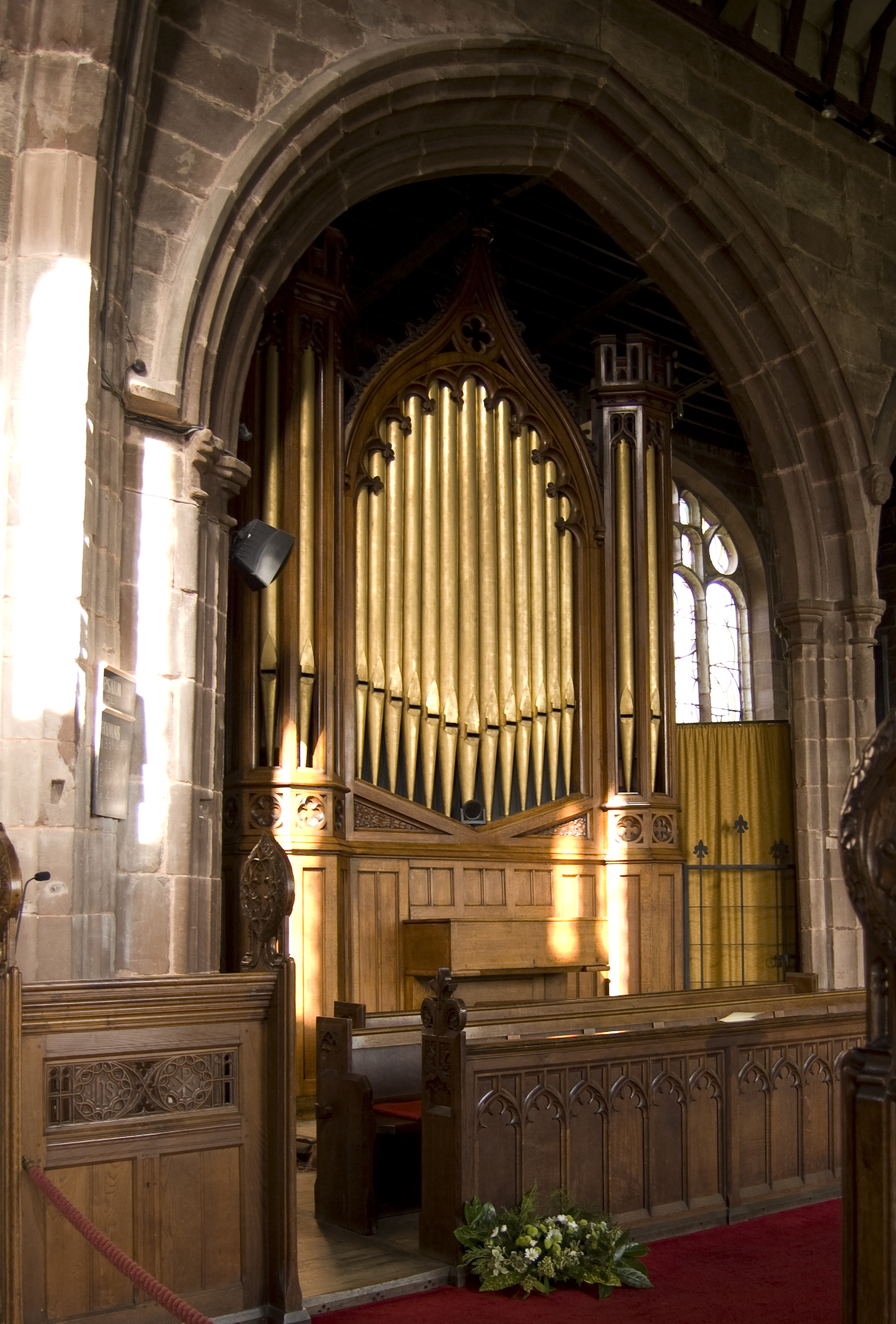
Organ in the chancel

== See also ==
- Grade I listed buildings in Cheshire West and Chester
- Grade I listed churches in Cheshire
- Listed buildings in Great Budworth
- List of church restorations and alterations by Anthony Salvin
- List of church restorations, amendments and furniture by John Douglas
