= Samuel Renn =

English pipe organ builder (1786–1845)

Samuel Renn (10 June 1786 – 11 January 1845) was an English organ builder who ran a business in Stockport, and later he traded in Manchester. The surviving instruments are mainly in churches, although a house organ is also known.

Renn was born in Kedleston, Derbyshire, where his father was employed at Kedleston Hall. In 1799 he was apprenticed to his uncle, James Davis, an organ builder in London. Renn became his foreman and supervised organ installations and maintenance in London and in Lancashire. When Davis retired Renn went into partnership with John Boston and traded as Renn & Boston in Stockport from 1822 to 1825 and then in Manchester. He died in Manchester in 1845.

Renn developed a factory system for building organs, using standardised dimensions, thereby reducing the costs, while continuing to produce artistic designs. Between 1822 and 1845 over 100 organs were produced by Renn.

The business continued under other names and became Jardine and Co.

== Legacy ==
The musical properties of Renn organs have been praised by critics and material from the organs has frequently been re-used in their restorations. However, many of the organs have been lost due to closure of churches. The best surviving Renn organ is in St Philip's Church, Salford.

== Surviving Renn organs and cases ==
- St John the Baptist's Church, Bollington (some stops)
- St Mary's Church, Disley (organ case and some stops)
- St Mary and All Saints Church, Great Budworth
- Macclesfield Heritage Centre (formerly a Sunday School)
- St George's Church, New Mills (case)
- St Thomas' Church, Pendleton
- St Philip's Church, Salford
- St Thomas' Church, Stockport
