= Rowland Egerton-Warburton =

British poet (1804–91)

Rowland Egerton-Warburton JP DL
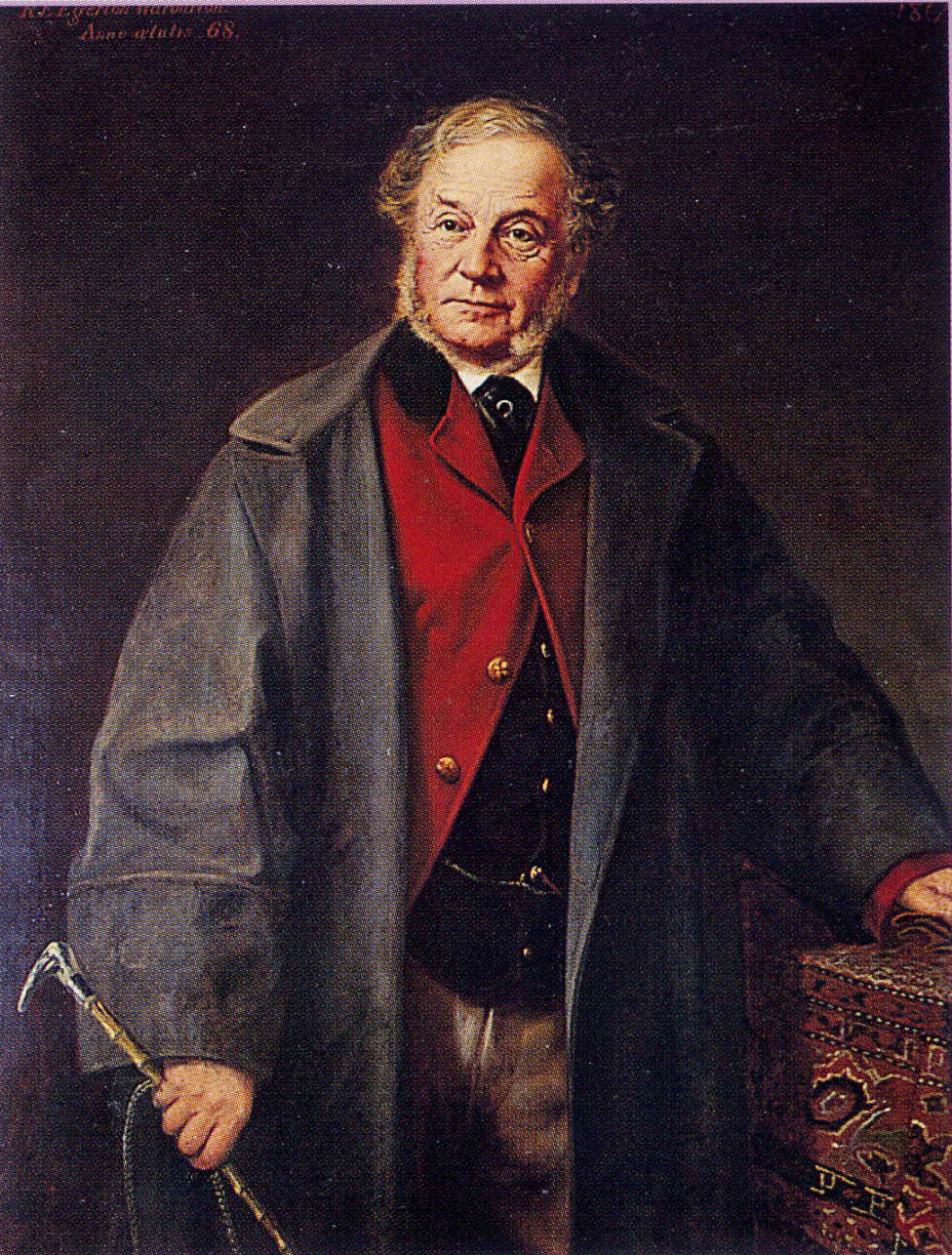
- Born: 14 September 1804; Norley Bank, Cheshire, England
- Died: 6 December 1891 (aged 87); Arley Hall, Cheshire, England
- Resting place: St Mary & All Saints Church, Great Budworth, Cheshire
- Education: Eton College
- Alma mater: Corpus Christi College, Oxford
- Known for: Rebuilding Arley Hall
- Spouse: Mary Brooke
- Children: 3
- Parent(s): Rowland Egerton; Emma née Croxton
- Relatives: Peter Egerton-Warburton (brother); Piers Egerton-Warburton (son)

Rowland Eyles Egerton-Warburton JP DL (14 September 1804 – 6 December 1891) was an English landowner and poet from the Egerton family in Cheshire. He was a devout Anglican in the high church tradition and a local benefactor. As patron, he paid for the restoration of his parish church and for the building of two new churches in villages on his estates. He also built cottages and farm buildings in the villages.

Through his mother's line, he inherited the Arley and Warburton estates in Cheshire. He is best remembered for rebuilding Arley Hall and its chapel dedicated to St Mary, and for helping to create the picturesque appearance of the village of Great Budworth. He and his wife designed extensive new formal gardens to the southeast of the hall, which included one of the earliest herbaceous borders in the British Isles. The hall and gardens, still owned by the family, are now open to the public.

Egerton-Warburton's principal hobby was hunting. He was a keen member and later President of the Tarporley Hunt Club in Cheshire. He also wrote poetry, the subject matter of which reflected his interests in hunting and in the countryside. Some of his rhymes are to be found on signposts in the grounds of the hall.

== Early life ==
He was born Rowland Egerton in 1804 at Norley Bank, near Norley, Cheshire, the eldest son of the Revd Rowland Egerton and his wife, Emma née Croxton. His father was the seventh son of Philip Egerton who succeeded as the 9th baronet of Egerton and Oulton on the death of his elder brother in 1825. His maternal grandmother (also called Emma) was the youngest sister of Sir Peter Warburton, 5th baronet of Arley, who had no children. Sir Peter died in 1813 and in his Will he left the estates of Warburton and Arley to Rowland junior, who was at that time still a minor. His father added the surname "Warburton" by Royal Licence in the same year. Egerton-Warburton was educated at Eton College, and although he was admitted to Corpus Christi College, Oxford in 1823, there is no evidence that he graduated. After going down from Oxford, he went on a Grand Tour, and returned to the life of a squire at Arley Hall, having gained control of the estates on achieving his age of majority in 1825.

== Landowner and benefactor ==
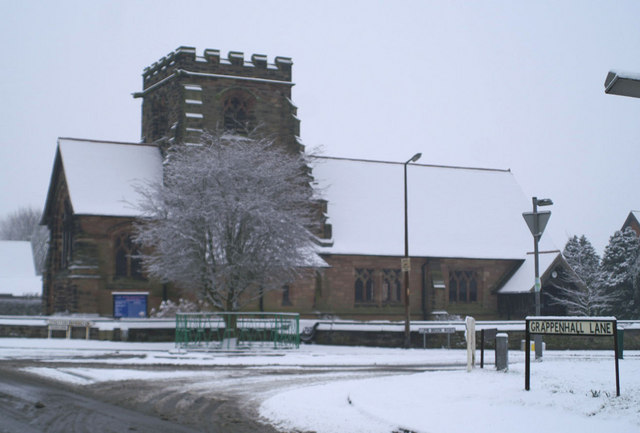
St Cross Church, Appleton Thorn

Egerton-Warburton managed the Arley estate from 1825 until his death in 1891. During this time the estate was profitable and he was able to enjoy a larger income than his predecessors. He was a high church Anglican and a supporter of the Oxford Movement, having been influenced by Keble, Pusey and Newman. He regularly attended choral Matins in the chapel at Arley Hall, and on hunt days he wore his hunting colours. He took little interest in politics, in which respect he is regarded as having been "passive".

In the 1850s he paid for the restoration of his local parish church of St Mary and All Saints at Great Budworth, where he encouraged a more Anglo-Catholic style of worship. He paid for the building of new churches in two villages on his estates. In the village of Warburton he paid for the new church of St Werburgh. This was built in 1883–85 to a design by John Douglas of Chester, at which time Egerton-Warburton's nephew, the Rev. Geoffrey Egerton-Warburton, was the incumbent. This church replaced the old church in Warburton, also dedicated to St Werburgh, as the parish church. The old church still exists on another site in the village. In the village of Appleton Thorn, 3.3 miles (5 km) to the north of Arley Hall, he paid for St Cross Church, which was built in 1886–87 to a design by Edmund Kirby of Liverpool.

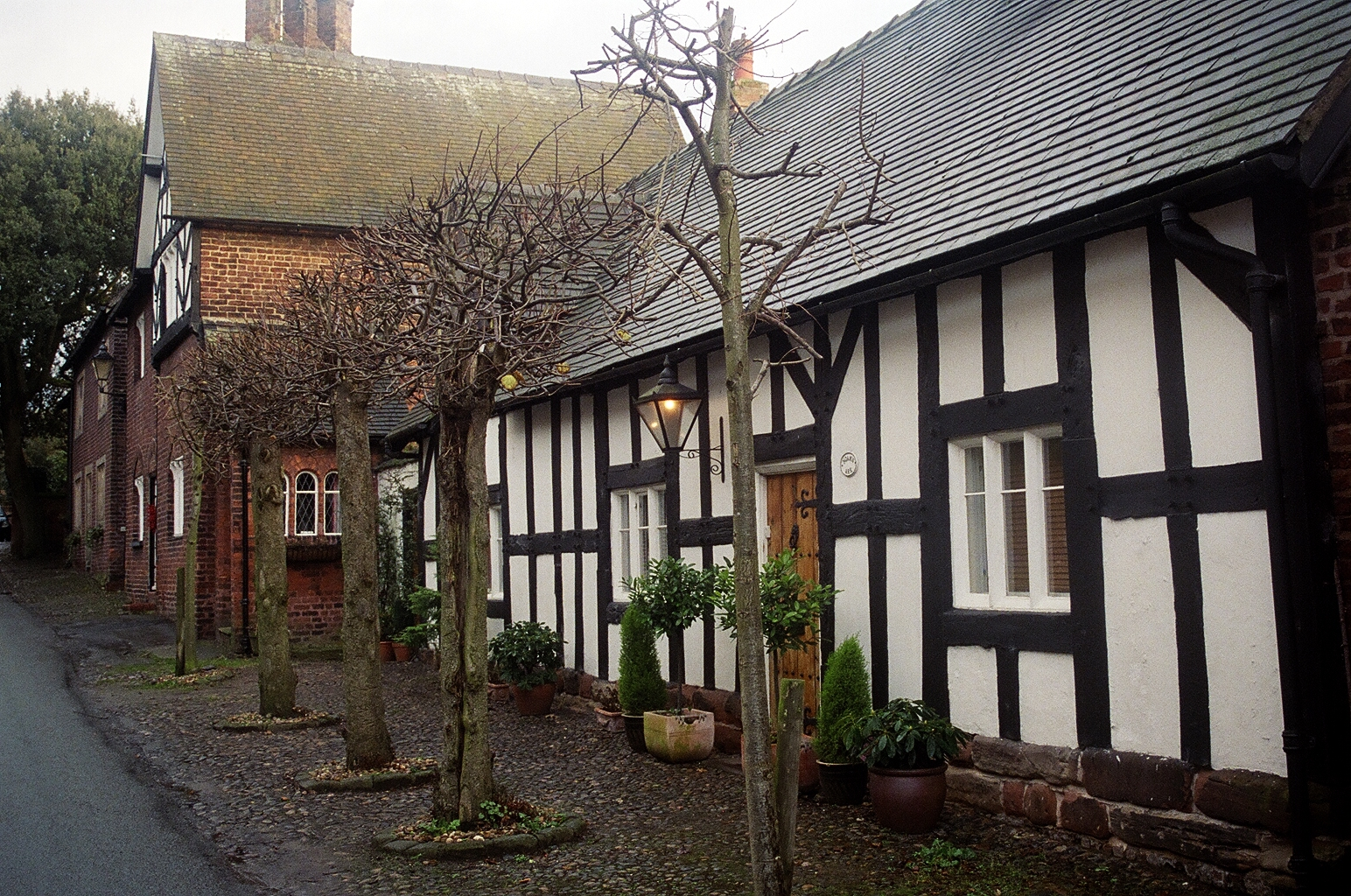
Cottages in Great Budworth

Egerton-Warburton also paid for the construction of secular buildings in villages on his estates, many of which were designed by John Douglas. In Great Budworth he had a "campaign to restore the village and render it picturesque in Victorian eyes". He restored many of the cottages in the village and built new ones to blend with them. In 1875, the George and Dragon, a simple three-bay Georgian inn in the village, was remodelled by adding ribbed chimneys, moulded brick mullions, an elliptical-headed doorway and a steep pyramid-shaped turret. The village has changed little since then and it remains "one of Cheshire's most charming villages". In 1873 he paid for the building of a cottage in Arley Green and founded Arley School in the village. In Warburton, he paid for a school in 1871–72, a church hall in 1889, and a post office in 1893. Features in the style of Douglas were added to the timber-framed Bent Farm, which stands opposite the new church, in 1880. He also built the public road from Arley Hall to Appleton Thorn.

== Fox hunter and poet ==
Egerton-Warburton was a keen fox hunter and rode with the Tarporley Hunt Club, of which he became a member in 1825 and president in 1838. When he retired from hunting in 1873, he was made an honorary member of the club. His friend, the Bishop of Oxford, Samuel Wilberforce, described him as being "equally at home in the hunting field and the parish church". He was appointed a Deputy Lieutenant of Cheshire in 1825, was an officer in the Royal Cheshire Militia and in the Cheshire Yeomanry, served as a Justice of the Peace, and was High Sheriff of Cheshire for 1833.

His poetry, usually on the subjects of hunting and country life, was light-hearted and popular. In 1834 he published his Hunting Songs, which ran to eight editions. Titles of the songs include "A Good Merry Gallop for Me!" and "Farmer Dobbin". His nine-stanza poem "Quaesitum meritis" is considered to be his best work. He created signposts on his estate with rhyming inscriptions, some of which are still present. He also published more serious documents about the cattle plague of 1747–49. Lord Halifax referred to him as "a perfect combination, a good churchman, a good landlord, a keen sportsman, and a man of literary tastes". In his 1885 book Hunting, the Duke of Beaufort described Warburton as 'that Homer of the hunting-field'.

He also wrote a couplet as an epitaph for the headstone of Copenhagen, the war horse ridden at the Battle of Waterloo by Arthur Wellesley, 1st Duke of Wellington. The couplet, "God's humbler instrument, though meaner clay, should share the glory of that glorious day," was written at the request of the 2nd Duke, when he erected a tombstone for his father's famous horse on his grave at Strathfield Saye. The first Duke would have approved of the choice of poet, since he, like Egerton-Warburton, was a keen sportsman, and in fact, the Duke had often hunted on Copenhagen when the two of them were in the Peninsula.

== Rebuilding of Arley Hall ==
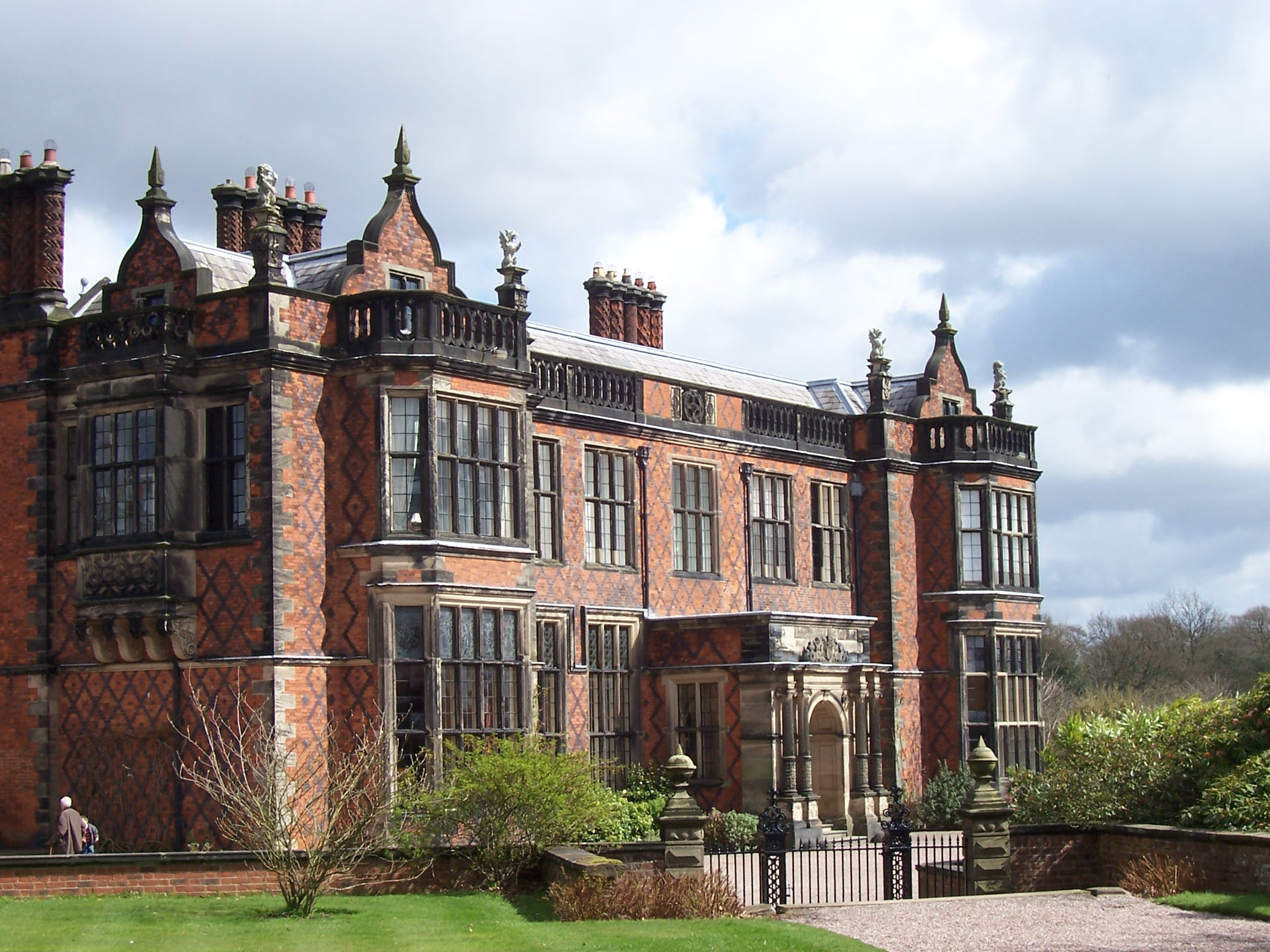
South front of Arley Hall, Cheshire

When Egerton-Warburton took over the estate, the hall was "dilapidated and swarming with rats", and so he decided to replace it completely. He took great interest in the design of the new house and chapel, and his ideas reflected respectively his artistic and his religious values. In respect of the house, he was influenced by the spirit of the Romantic movement. He also wanted the new house to reflect his ancient lineage: "to suggest something of the piety of the Middle Ages as well as the grandeur of Elizabethan England". He, therefore, rejected the neoclassical style of architecture, which was fashionable at the time, and chose instead to build a house in what is now known as Jacobethan style. He also wanted it to incorporate modern technology and materials in its construction, and he did not want it to be too expensive. He commissioned a young local architect, George Latham from Nantwich, and worked closely with him in the design. Latham suggested that the final cost would be in the region of £5,000–6,000 (£490,000–£590,000 today). It was agreed that every architectural feature of the house should have an exact model in an existing Elizabethan building. Egerton-Warburton and Latham travelled together and visited such buildings to study these features.

The first phase of building started in 1832, and the east, north and west wings of the old house were demolished. Most of the new buildings in this phase consisted of servants' quarters and utility rooms. A drawing room, grand staircase and hall were built but they were left unfinished. Modern plumbing was fitted, the structure of the house was raised on arches to reduce the effect of damp, and the spaces under the arches were ventilated and warmed by a patent device. This phase was completed in 1835 at a cost of about £13,000 (£1.43 million today). Egerton-Warburton then took a break, partly to raise the money needed for the completion of the house, and also to work on the designs of the remaining rooms. The second and final phase was built between 1840 and 1845. The south front was demolished and the building, much of which is present today, was finished. The final cost of the house came to about £30,000 (£3.15 million today).

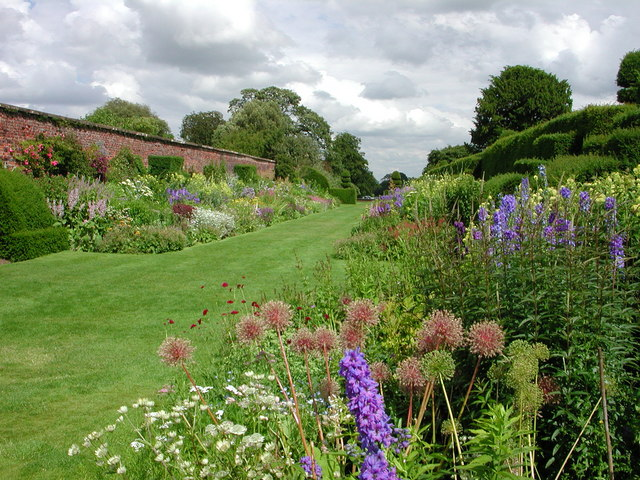
Herbaceous border at Arley Hall

In designing the chapel, he again broke away from the classical style of architecture. Having been influenced by the Oxford Movement, he decided that it should be designed in Gothic style. He commissioned the nationally famous architect Anthony Salvin to design a Gothic Revival chapel, which was completed and consecrated in 1845. In 1856–57, a north aisle and porch were added to a design by George Street.

When Egerton-Warburton took over the estate, the gardens were mainly to the east of the hall, but with his wife, Mary, he designed new gardens. These were developed to the southwest of the hall between 1840 and 1860. They implemented their designs apparently without any professional help, and the present gardens are largely the result of their planning. The herbaceous border was one of the first of its type to have been created in England. Items they planted which are still present include the yew finials in the herbaceous border, which were planted in 1856, and the holly oak cylinders in the Ilex Walk, which were also planted in the 1850s.

== Family and later life ==
Egerton-Warburton was the eldest child of ten; he had four brothers and five sisters. His younger brother, James Francis, who was born in 1807, graduated MA and became the rector of Warburton. Henry William was born in 1808, and served as a Major in the 47th (Lancashire) Regiment of Foot. Peter, born in 1813, joined the East India Company before emigrating to Australia, where he achieved some fame as an explorer. The youngest brother, George Edward was born in 1819; he also settled in Western Australia, becoming a farmer. Egerton-Warburton's sisters were Emma Elizabeth (1805–1891), who married James Saurin, Archdeacon of Dromore, Frances Mary (1809), Maria Sybilla (1812–1895), who married the noted horticulturalist James Bateman, Charlotte (1815), and Sophia (1816).

On 7 April 1831, Egerton-Warburton married Mary Brooke, the eldest daughter of Sir Richard Brooke, 6th baronet of Norton Priory and Harriet Cunliffe, daughter of Sir Foster Cunliffe, 3rd Baronet. They had three children, Mary Alice, Piers (later MP for Mid Cheshire), and Mary. His wife died in 1881 and his younger daughter and her family moved in to live with him. By 1874 he was suffering from glaucoma, and soon afterwards became blind. He continued to take walks, led on a leather strap by his gardener. He had a path, Furlong Walk, constructed from the terrace at the hall with wire to guide him. His health began to fail from 1888 and he died in 1891 at the age of 87. He was buried in the family vault at Great Budworth Church. His estate amounted to a little over £51,670 (£5.68 million today).

== Arms ==
Coat of arms of Egerton-Warburton (Grand quarter)
| Notes Royal Licence issued in 1813 - https://www.thegazette.co.uk/London/issue/16765/page/1635 Crest 1st, On a wreath of the colours, a man's head affrontée couped at the shoulders Proper, round the temples a wreath Argent and Gules, issuing therefrom three ostrich feathers Or (Warburton); 2nd, On a wreath of the colours, three arrows, two in saltire and one in pale Or, headed and feathered Sable, bound with a ribbon Gules (Egerton). Escutcheon Grand Quarterly, 1st and 4th: quarterly: i and iiii, Argent, a chevron between three cormorants Sable (Warburton); ii. and iii., Argent, a lion rampant Gules, between three pheons Sable (Egerton); 2nd: the same arms of Egerton; 3rd: Barry of six Argent and Azure, a label of five points Gules (Grey). Motto Je voil droit avoyre (Warburton); Virtute non armis fido (Egerton) |
