= Christ Church, Wharton =

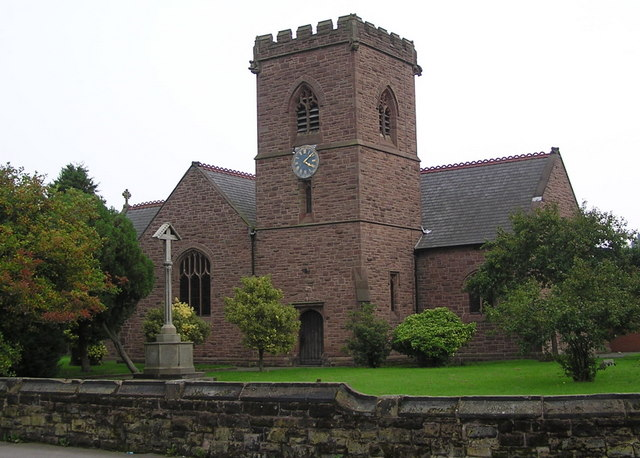
- Christ Church, Wharton
- 53.195400°N 2.506000°W
- Location: Winsford, Cheshire,
- Country: England
- Denomination: Church of England
- Previous denomination: Conservative Evangelical
- Website: Church website

History
- Status: Active
- Consecrated: 1843 (chapel of ease); 1849 and 1913 (church)

Architecture
- Functional status: Parish church
- Architectural type: Church
- Style: Gothic Revival
- Completed: Rebuilt 1849, with later additions
- Construction cost: £1,574 10s 7d (1849 building)

Specifications
- Capacity: 350 (1849 seating capacity)
- Materials: Brick with red sandstone facing Slate roof

Administration
- Province: Province of York
- Diocese: Diocese of Chester

Christ Church, Wharton, is in the town of Winsford, Cheshire, England (grid reference SJ663665). It is an active evangelical Anglican parish church in the diocese of Chester, the archdeaconry of Chester and the deanery of Middlewich.

== History ==
Christ Church, Wharton, traces its origins to an unconsecrated chapel of ease built c.1835 at the instigation of John Furnival, a curate of Davenham. This was the first Anglican religious building in Wharton, and was built to be a challenge to the growth of Methodism in the district. The chapel was located at Wharton Bridges. Its exact location is unknown, but Wharton Bridges was the original name of the road bridge on Wharton Road, crossing the London and North Western Railway.

When the parish of Wharton was created in 1843, initially as a district of Davenham parish (it was not until 10 March 1860 that Wharton became a separate ecclesiastical parish), the Wharton Bridges chapel was replaced by a new chapel of ease. It was built by James France-France, of Bostock Hall, Bostock, on Crook Lane, at its junction with School Road. The new chapel, called Christ's Church, was consecrated on 26 June 1843 by the Bishop of Chester, John Bird Sumner. A vicarage was built in 1848, formed from two cottages, at a cost of £673 14s.

During the 1840s the population of Wharton increased by approximately 27 per cent, from 1,400 persons in 1841 to 1,775 persons in 1851, and Christ's Church chapel of ease was soon considered too small for the parish. With money raised from public subscription, including gifts from Princess Victoria of Saxe-Coburg-Saalfeld the queen mother (mother of Queen Victoria), John Bird Sumner (the newly appointed Archbishop of Canterbury) and grants from the Church Building Societies, the chapel was substantially enlarged with a nave, chancel and bell tower. The old chapel of ease became the north and south transepts of the new building (called Christ Church), which provided seating on benches for 350 persons. The cost of the rebuilding was £1,574 10s 7d, and the church was consecrated on 20 December 1849 by the Bishop of Chester, John Graham.

In 1913 the chancel was extended, and the church was reconsecrated on 18 October 1913 by the Bishop of Chester, Francis Jayne.

== Present day ==
One service is held on Sundays, a morning service, and a Communion service is held each Wednesday morning. The church supports missionary groups Open Doors, Gideons International, and AICMAR (African Institute for Contemporary Mission and Research).

Christ Church is within the Conservative Evangelical tradition of the Church of England. As a parish that rejects the leadership/ordination of women, it receives alternative episcopal oversight from the Bishop of Ebbsfleet.

== Structure ==
The church is built in brick with a red sandstone facing and a slate roof. It is a small cruciform ("cross-shaped") building in the Gothic Revival (Perpendicular) style of Christian church architecture. At the north-west is a square bell tower, originally surmounted with four slender pinnacles (removed at some time between 1874 and 1892). The main entrance to the building is at the foot of the tower. A single bell was installed in the bell tower in the 1849 scheme, but was replaced with a peal of eight tubular bells in 1897, the gift of Mrs Lea of Winsford Lodge, Wharton, in honour of Queen Victoria's Diamond Jubilee. The tower clock, made by the Shropshire company of JB Joyce & Co at a cost of £50 and installed in 1849, was the gift of saltworks proprietor John Dudley of Wharton Lodge, in memory of his wife, Elizabeth (a Latin inscription on the clock face records the gift).

== Fittings and furnishings ==
The church has a number of memorial windows in stained glass, most notable of which are the east window (to Revd John Lothian, died 1859 after being thrown from his horse), and the west window (to Revd John Samuel Bage, died 1873). The north and south transepts contain large metal panels overpainted with the Lord's Prayer, the Creed, and the Ten Commandments. The painting is in the Gothic Revival style, and the panels are probably contemporary with the building of the church. The church has had three organs. The first, installed in 1849, was replaced by the second organ, c.1874. This was replaced in 1920 by the present organ, the gift of Mrs Marion Newell in memory of her son, Sub-Lt Jack H.M. Newall, killed in action 13 November 1916, on the outskirts of Beaucourt-sur-l'Ancre, France, during the Battle of the Ancre. His medals are on display next to the organ. At the west end of the nave is a Commonwealth War Graves Commission headstone to Senior Aircraftsman Ian Shinner, killed in a Provisional Irish Republican Army (IRA) shooting at Roermond, the Netherlands, on May 2, 1988. The interior was lit by gas until electric lights were installed in 1937.

== External features ==
On the approach to the main entrance is a war memorial, an oak crucifix on a stone base erected in 1920 at a cost of £280. It records the names of 78 Wharton parishioners killed in action during World War I. The churchyard contains the war graves of five service personnel of World War I, and four of World War II.

== Clergy in the parish of Christ Church, Wharton ==
Minister	Years in office	Office
William Charles Dudley BA	1838–1840	Curate
Alleine Rogers	1840–1843	Curate
John Echlin Armstrong BA	1843–1845	Perpetual Curate
John Lowthian	1845–1859	Perpetual Curate (died in office)
John Samuel Bage MA	1859–1873	Perpetual Curate (died in office)
Thomas Davis	1873–1876	Perpetual Curate
Christopher Cay LL.B.	1876–1891	Perpetual Curate
Robert Eden Henley MA	1891–1933	Vicar (died in office)
William Alfred Edwards BA	1892–1893	Assistant Curate
Eric Medder Baden Southwell MA	1933–1938	Vicar
Duncan Baird	1938–1945	Vicar (Chaplain to the Forces 1940–45)
Kenneth Ashworth BA	1940–1947	Curate in Charge
William Alfred Edwards	1941	Assistant Curate
Idris Michael Evans	1941–1946	Curate in Charge
Kenneth Ashworth BA	1945–1946	Vicar
Thomas David Coleman Harrison	1947–1952	Vicar
Archibald Sholto Douglas MA	1952–1955	Vicar
Albert Brooks	1955–1962	Vicar
Thomas Albert Clarke	1962	Vicar (died in office)
Walford Oliver	1962–1972	Vicar
John Leslie Higgins BA M.Ed.	1972–1974	Vicar
John Alfred Minns	1974–1985	Vicar
Timothy David Herbert BA M.Phil.	1985–1993	Vicar
Dennis Tillotson	1986–1988	Assistant Curate (died in office)
Michael Leslie Eaman	1989–1993	Assistant Curate
Mark Andrew Pickles BA	1993–2000	Vicar
Timothy David Hanson BA	2000-2022	Vicar (resigned)
Thomas Annesley Watts MA M.Th.	2008-2012	Curate
Christopher Pierce BSc MA	2023-	Vicar
