= St Wilfrid's Church, Davenham =

Coordinates: 53.2372°N 2.5060°W

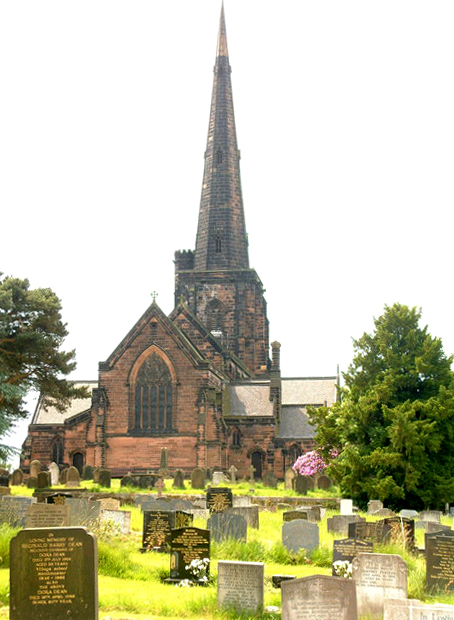
- St Wilfrid's Church, Davenham, from the east

- Location in Cheshire
- OS grid reference: SJ 663,713
- Location: Davenham, Cheshire
- Country: England
- Denomination: Anglican
- Website: St Wilfrid's, Davenham

History
- Status: Parish church
- Dedication: St Wilfrid

Architecture
- Functional status: Active
- Heritage designation: Grade II*
- Designated: 3 January 1967
- Architect(s): Edmund Sharpe; Sharpe and Paley; Paley and Austin
- Architectural type: Church
- Style: Gothic Revival
- Completed: 1870

Specifications
- Materials: Red sandstone ashlar Slate roof

Administration
- Province: York
- Diocese: Chester
- Archdeaconry: Chester
- Deanery: Middlewich
- Parish: Davenham

Clergy
- Rector: Rev Rob Iveson

St Wilfrid's Church is in the village of Davenham, Cheshire, England. The church is recorded in the National Heritage List for England as a designated Grade II* listed building. It is an active Anglican parish church in the diocese of Chester, the archdeaconry of Chester and the deanery of Middlewich.

== History ==
A church on the site was recorded in the Domesday Book of 1086. A later church was built in the 14th century and its chancel was rebuilt in 1680 and again in 1795. The present church dates from 1842 to 1844 when the body of the church was replaced, and the tower and spire were repaired, the architect being Edmund Sharpe of Lancaster. The nave was lengthened by one bay, heightened and widened, and galleries were inserted on three sides. The tower was damaged when it was struck by lightning on 16 July 1850. A new tower was designed by Sharpe and his partner at the time, E. G. Paley. The chancel and transepts date from 1870 by the later partners in the practice, Paley and Austin.

== Architecture ==
=== Exterior ===
The church is built in red sandstone ashlar with a slate roof. Its plan consists of a west tower, a five-bay nave with a clerestory, north and south aisles, a chancel with a north vestry and a south chantry chapel, and a southwest porch. The tower has an octagonal spire with three tiers of lucarnes.

=== Interior ===
In the chancel is a two-arched sedilia. The reredos contains an alabaster relief depicting The Last Supper. The monuments in the church include ones to William Tomkinson who died in 1770 by Benjamin Bromfield, to Mrs France who died in 1814 by S. and F. Franceys of Liverpool, to Mrs Harper dated 1833 by Francesco Pozzi of Florence with a relief of a mother and child, and to Frederick and Cecil France-Hayhurst who died in 1915, by Underwood. In the south aisle is a war memorial chapel designed by Sir Robert Lorimer. It contains a reredos with carvings of personifications of virtues, framed by carved friezes, and posts surmounted by angels. There are stained glass windows by David Evans of Shrewsbury dating from the early 19th century, and by J. C. Bewsey dated 1932. There is a ring of six bells. Four of these, dated 1757, 1761 (2), and 1765 are by Rudhall of Gloucester and a bell dated 1826 is by Thomas Mears II of the Whitechapel Bell Foundry. The sixth bell, which is undated, is by William Noone.

== External features ==
In the churchyard is a table tomb to the memory of William Worthington of Leftwich, a merchant who died in 1808, and members of his family. It is listed at Grade II. Also listed Grade II is the lych gate which dates from the late 19th century, and was designed by E. G. Paley. Also in the churchyard is a memorial to the Russell Allen family, with dates including 1927, also by Lorimer. The churchyard contains 18 war graves of British service personnel, 13 from World War I, and five from World War II.

== See also ==
- Grade II* listed buildings in Cheshire West and Chester
- Listed buildings in Davenham
- List of architectural works by Edmund Sharpe
- List of works by Sharpe and Paley
- List of ecclesiastical works by Paley and Austin
