= Moulton, Cheshire =

Village in Cheshire, England

Coordinates: 53.222°N 2.515°W

Moulton
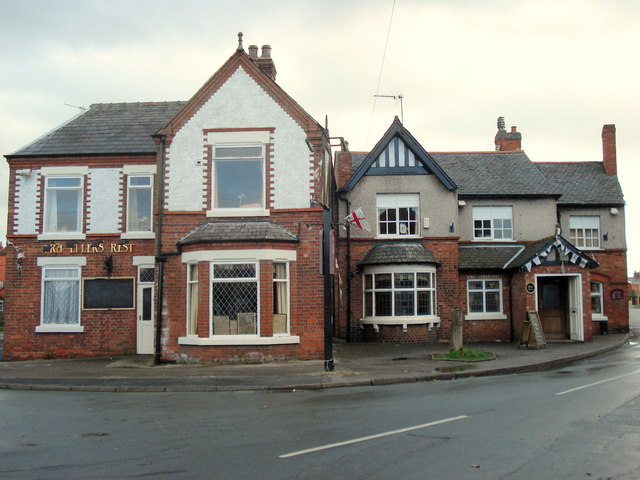
- The Travellers Rest public house

- Location within Cheshire
- OS grid reference: SJ656696
- Civil parish: Moulton
- Unitary authority: Cheshire West and Chester
- Ceremonial county: Cheshire
- Region: North West
- Country: England
- Sovereign state: United Kingdom
- Post town: NORTHWICH
- Postcode district: CW9
- Dialling code: 01606
- Police: Cheshire
- Fire: Cheshire
- Ambulance: North West
- UK Parliament: Mid Cheshire

Moulton is a civil parish and village in Cheshire, England, 3 miles (4.8 km) south of Northwich and 3 miles (4.8 km) north of Winsford.

== History ==
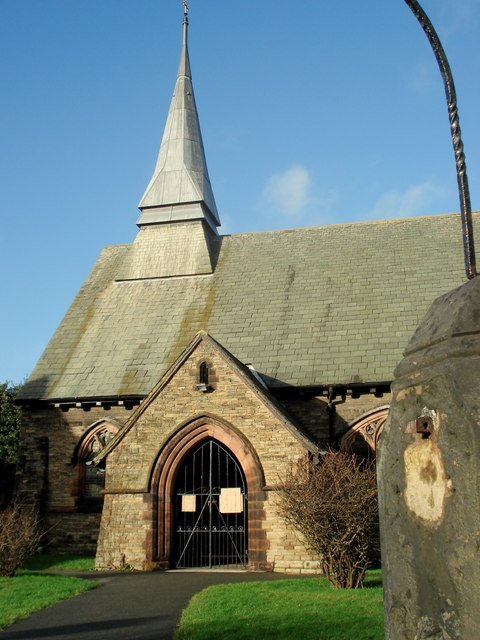
Moulton Church

The village can trace its history back to the Norman Conquest. Moletune is listed in the Domesday Book of 1086 as being among the estates of Baron Richard de Vernon of Shipbrook. George Ormerod described the village in 1882 thus: 'Moulton occupies a high ridge of ground, running parallel with the general course of the Weaver, and commanding a most extensive view over the vales of that river, and of the Mersey, in the several directions of Delamere Forest and Lancashire.'

During the 19th century the character of the village changed from purely agricultural to a more mixed economy. Many workers in the salt mining industry, which lined the banks of the River Weaver, made their homes in Moulton. The factory owners built the terraced housing in Church Street and Regent Street for their employees, and in 1884 they opened the Verdin Institute complete with reading room, library, and billiard tables and gave it to the community.

During the Second World War, Moulton was bombed several times. On one occasion, German bombers fire-bombed down the backs of the Regent Street houses, thereby missing all dwellings and resulting in no casualties.

After the War the salt-mining industry quickly declined as new methods of abstracting salt by solution mining replaced the old fashioned pumping of wild brine and its attendant subsidence. The village quickly became a residential area with most folk working in nearby Northwich or Winsford. New housing development in the mid-1960s increased the population by over 60%.

Moulton is now a thriving community of about 3,000 people. The local hall is run by St Stephen's Church and is host to a range of organisations including the Moulton Drama Group and Moulton Adventure Group.

Moulton School provides primary education to the children of the village. The school has strong links with the local secondary school, the County High School Leftwich, which is a Converter Academy.

Moulton is home to the Moulton Verdin F.C., which plays in the Mid Cheshire Sunday League.

== Buildings ==
The Methodist chapel dates from 1875; the Co-operative store was built in 1894; and nearby Moulton Cottage with its dated clock of 1871 was formerly Mr. Wilson's Shoe Shop, where clogs were made.

In 1877 the Revd. Thomas France-Hayhurst of Bostock Hall sponsored the building of a new church dedicated to St Stephen the Martyr.

In January 1884 the Verdin Institute was opened, comprising reading room, library and billiards room. This was a gift from the Verdin family in memory of their late father Joseph Verdin who with his brother Richard, founded Verdin & Sons at the time the largest salt manufacturer in the UK. This is now the Moulton Verdin Working Mens Club.

A war memorial in Main Road was unveiled in 1920.

== Notable people ==
- Jane Felix-Browne, daughter-in-law of Osama bin Laden, was a parish councillor in Moulton.
- Geoff Crompton (1933–2021), founder of the Moulton Adventure Group. Author of 34 Men, Another Dozen and Thirty Years of Camping with the Moulton Adventure Group.

== See also ==
- Listed buildings in Moulton, Cheshire
- St Stephen's Church, Moulton
