= Whitegate, Cheshire =

Village in Cheshire, England

Coordinates: 53.219988°N 2.556943°W

Whitegate
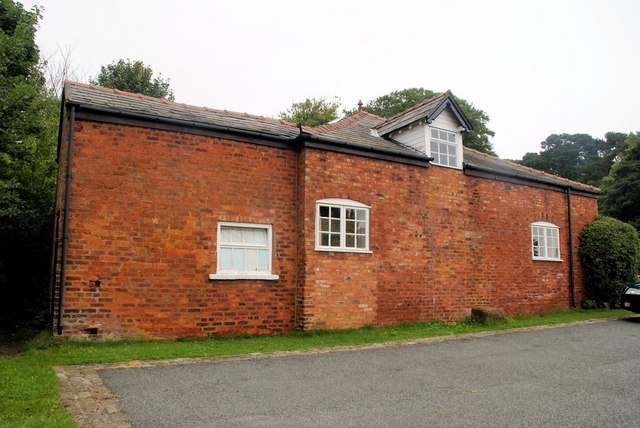
- Village hall, a former coach house

- Location within Cheshire
- Population: 971
- OS grid reference: SJ629693
- Civil parish: Whitegate and Marton
- Unitary authority: Cheshire West and Chester
- Ceremonial county: Cheshire
- Region: North West
- Country: England
- Sovereign state: United Kingdom
- Post town: Northwich
- Postcode district: CW8
- Dialling code: 01606
- Police: Cheshire
- Fire: Cheshire
- Ambulance: North West
- UK Parliament: Mid Cheshire

Whitegate is a small village in Cheshire, England, near the towns of Northwich and Winsford. It is in the civil parish of Whitegate and Marton, in the unitary authority of Cheshire West and Chester.

At its centre is an ancient Anglican church. Nearby Vale Royal Abbey was once the largest Cistercian abbey church in Britain.

== The railway ==
Whitegate was once connected to the national rail network, although the station was some distance from the village centre.

The railway branched from the Chester to Manchester (via Northwich) line near Cuddington, with a single stop at Whitegate and terminated at Winsford and Over.

The line was principally used for freight to and from the numerous salt works in the Winsford area. Passenger services had a somewhat chequered history, being twice suspended for a number of years during the nineteenth century. After being restored in 1892, following a four-year break, passenger services continued until January 1931 when they were withdrawn for the final time. Whitegate station closed in to all traffic in November 1963, and the whole line in February 1968.

== Whitegate Way ==
By the 1970s the course of the disused railway had been turned into a footpath and bridle way. It is now open from close to the original junction near Cuddington to the site of the Winsford and Over terminus near the River Weaver.

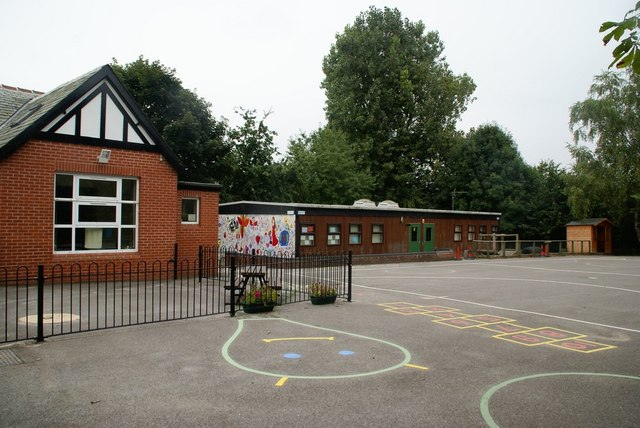
Primary school in Whitegate

== See also ==
- Listed buildings in Whitegate and Marton
- St Mary's Church, Whitegate
- Vale Royal Abbey
