= Ravenscroft Hall =

House in Byley, Cheshire, England

Coordinates: 53.20479°N 2.44564°W

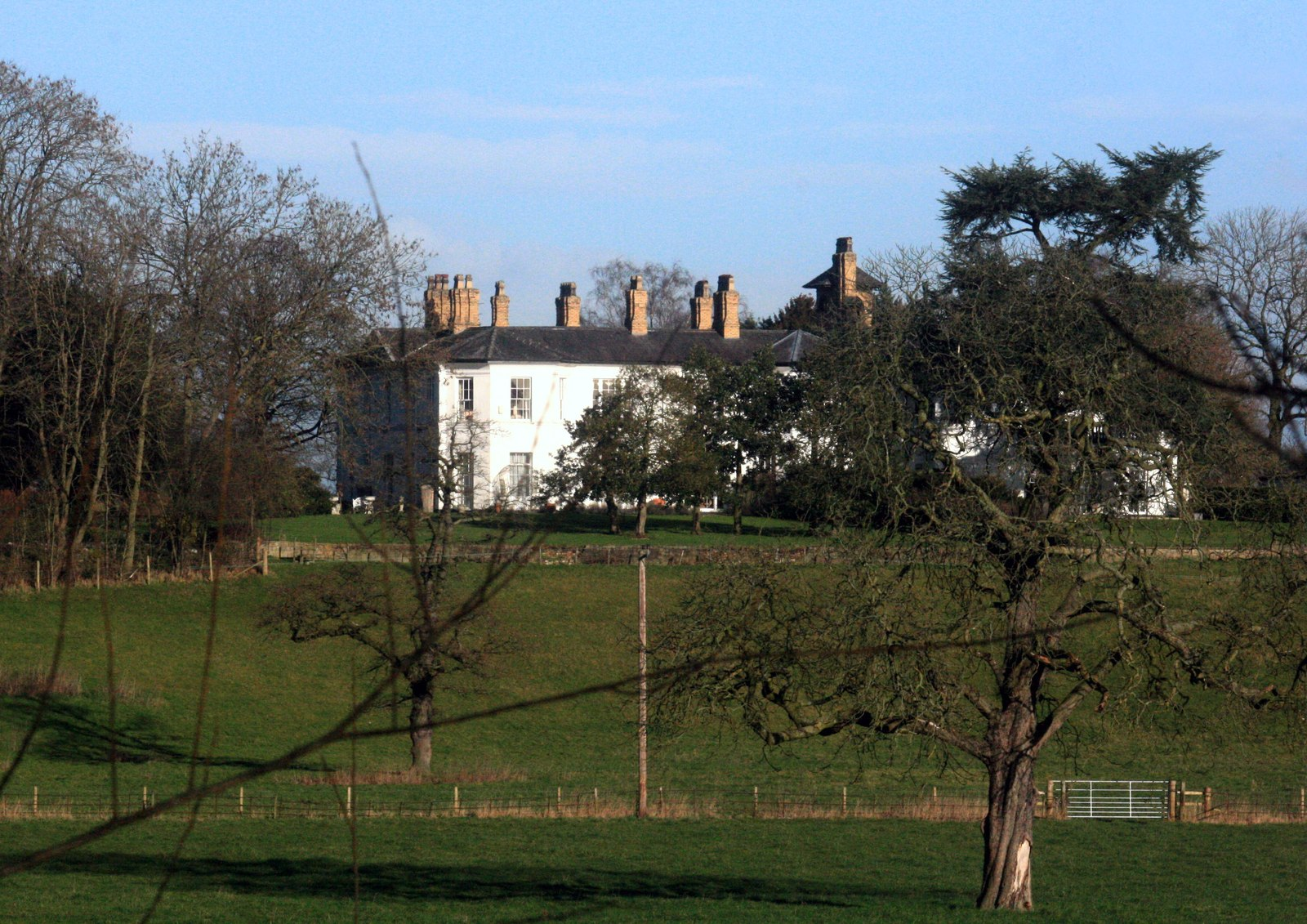
Ravenscroft Hall seen from Middlewich (2014)

Ravenscroft Hall is a country house standing to the east of the B5309 road (King Street) about 1 mile (1.6 km) to the north of Middlewich, Cheshire, England. The house was built in 1837 for William T. Buchanan, replacing a former Jacobean house. It was extended, possibly in 1852 when the house was bought by the Moss family, and again in 1877. The house has since been divided into two dwellings. It is constructed in roughcast and yellow brick, with stone dressings and slate roofs. The house is in two storeys, with a main front of five bays, and a five-bay extension to the northeast. The garden front also has five bays. The house has an Ionic porch, and an Italianate belvedere. It is recorded in the National Heritage List for England as a designated Grade II listed building.

== Early residents ==
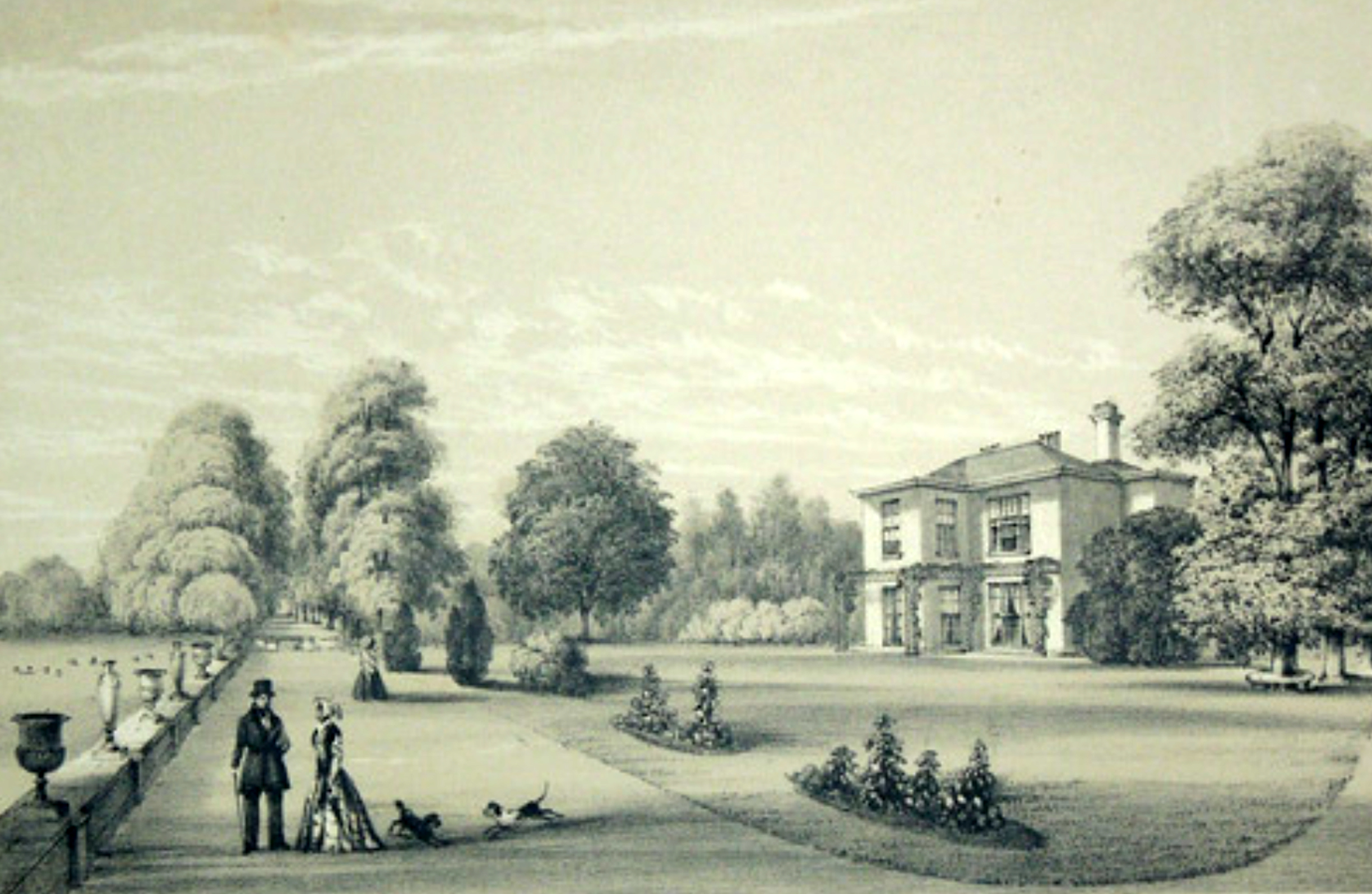
Ravenscroft Hall in 1850 when it was owned by Mrs Wade

William Theophilus Buchanan (1793–1865) who built Ravenscroft Hall in 1837 was a member of the wealthy Buchanan family of Hales Hall. His father was John Buchanan of Donally estate in Ireland and his mother was Elizabeth Phillips daughter and heiress of John Phillips of Wavertree, Lancashire.

William was an officer in the 13rd Light Dragoons and fought in many famous battles of the early 19th Century. He was in the Peninsula Wars, and was at the Battles of Bayonne, Orthes and Toulouse. He won a war medal with four clasps for his gallantry in these events. In 1823 he married Eliza Ann Massie, daughter of Reverend Richard Massie of Coddington. The couple had no children. In 1846 they sold the house to Colonel Thomas Francis Wade.

Colonel Thomas Francis Wade (1790–1846) was also in the military and fought in similar battles. In 1816 he married Frances Ann Smythe (1792–1851) who was the daughter of William Smythe of Barbavilla Manor, Collinstown. Thomas died soon after he bought the Hall and Frances became the owner. The book by Twycross called "Views of the Principal Seats in the County of Cheshire" published in 1850 contained a lithograph of the house. It is titled "Ravenscroft the Seat of Mrs Wade". She died in 1851 and her family sold the property to Elkanah Moss.

== Later residents ==
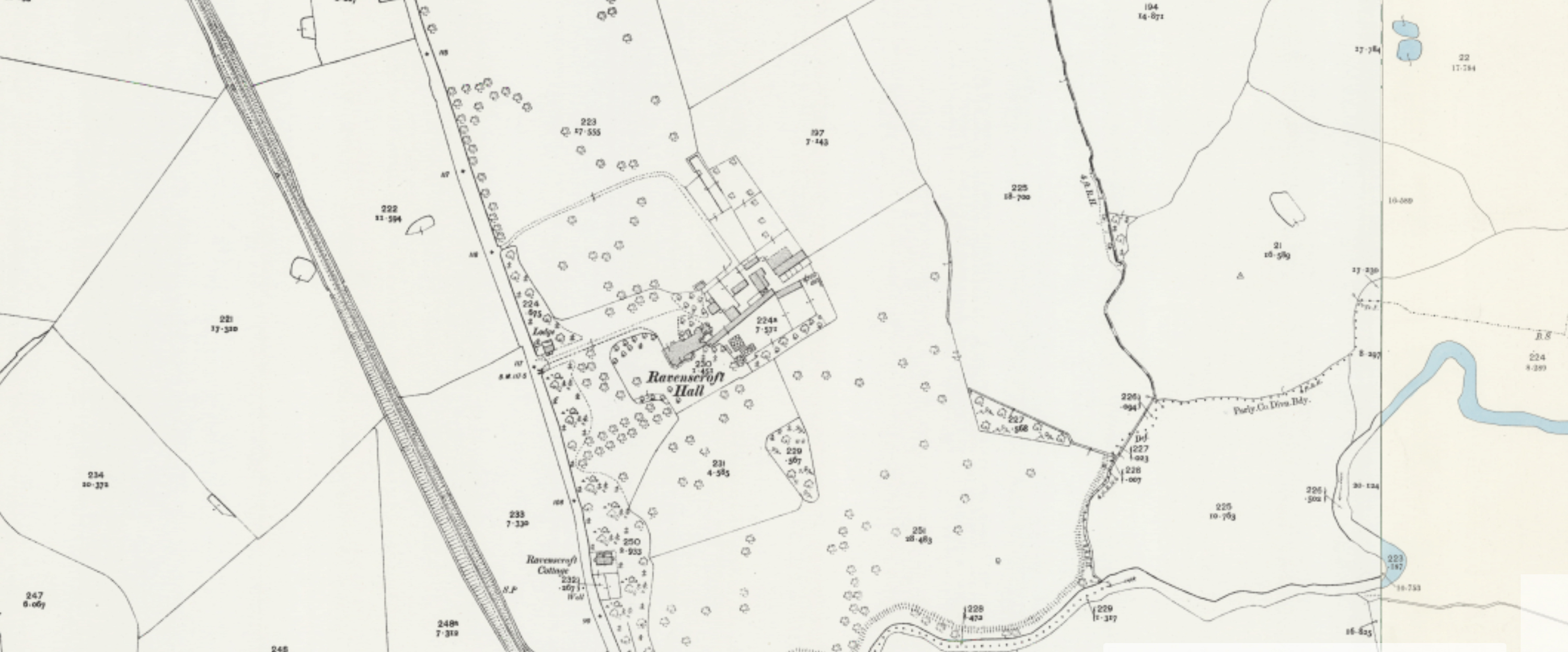
Map Ravenscroft Hall 1900

Elkanah Moss (1804–1871) was a wealthy cotton manufacturer. In 1846 he married Hannah Lees (1811–1895) who was the daughter of John Lees of Waterhead Mill. The couple had one son and one daughter. When Elkanah died in 1871 Hannah continued to live at the Hall with her son Edward Howard Moss (1849–1925) who was an officer in the 1st Royal Cheshire Regiment. He was a bachelor and later retired from the military to help his mother run the estate. It seems that he was also responsible for the 1877 major additions to the house. After his mother died in 1895 he continued to run the estate until 1907 when he married at the age of 57 and moved to London. His sister Mary Lees Kay and her husband Christopher Kay moved into the Hall.

Mary Lees Kay (1853–1937) had married Christopher Kay in 1874 and the couple had lived in Davenham Hall for many years. Soon after they moved to Ravenscroft Hall her husband died but she continued to live there for the next 30 years and was greatly involved in the affairs of the community. During World War 1 she managed the Middlewich Red Cross hospital and lent the Hall as an annex to the hospital. After the War she continued her philanthropic work and in 1919 she was awarded an OBE. Her obituary of 1937 outlines all of her work. It states:

"By her death social, philanthropic and political movements in Cheshire have lost a prominent and most valued supporter. Besides occupying the presidency of the Victoria Infirmary Northwich for twenty years, she gave her services for the same period as Secretary to the Church of England's Waifs and Strays Society. Mrs Kay was also Vice-President of the Cheshire Branch of the British Red Cross Society, a District Commissioner in the Girl Guides Association, a vice president of the Cheshire Needlework, president of the Middlewich Womens Help Society and President of the Middlewich District Nursing Association.

Keenly interested in politics Mrs Kay was an influential leader in the Conservative cause for many years, first in connection with the Primrose League and latterly as vice-president of the Northwich Division of the Women's Unionist Association."

During World War 2 the Hall became a First Aid Post. In 1940 it was damaged by a bomb, the blast bringing down the ground floor ceilings of the first aid rooms and Women's Voluntary Service rooms and smashing all the glass in the ground floor.

In 1947 the property became a boarding and day pupil school. The Principal was Caroline Christine Plant (1882–1971) who was the widow of Wilfred Lawson Plant a former schoolmaster. In 1962 she retired and the school was taken over by David and Ida Smith who became joint Principals.

== See also ==
- Listed buildings in Byley
