= Whatcroft Hall =

- Location in Cheshire
- 53.22482°N 2.48091°W
- Location: Near Davenham, Cheshire, England
- OS grid reference: SJ680 699

History
- Built: 1780

Site notes
- Architectural style: Georgian
- Restored: 1807, 1938, 2011

Listed Building – Grade II*
- Designated: 10 March 1953
- Reference no.: 1138463

Whatcroft Hall is a country house situated 1.5 miles (2.4 km) to the southeast of the village of Davenham, Cheshire, England. It stands to the east of, and overlooking, the Trent and Mersey Canal. The house is recorded in the National Heritage List for England as a designated Grade II* listed building.

== History ==
Whatcroft Hall was built in 1780, and enlarged in 1807 for James Topping. The enlargement included a new front, and a dome at the centre of the house over a spiral staircase. There was a later extension adding bay windows, a loggia and a service wing. These were removed in 1938 when the house was reduced in size for Mrs F. F. Stirling.

Some stained glass for "8 Emblematical Windows" was supplied to Topping by William Raphael Eginton.

The house was being remodelled again in 2011.

Comedian John Bishop bought the property with 28 acres of land in 2011. It was subsequently announced that the proposed northern route for the high speed rail line HS2 would take the Manchester spur of the northern link within 150 metres of the property. It was reported in April 2019 that HS2 had purchased the property from Bishop for £6.8 million.

== Architecture ==
The house is constructed in brick with a slate roof. Its architectural style is Georgian. The house is in two storeys. The entrance front, which faces northwest, has six bays. At its corners are full-height pilasters surmounted by stone ogee finials. This front contains a pair of doors in a doorcase with pilasters, above which is frieze decorated with festoons and foliage, and a dentil pediment. The windows are sashes. The garden front at the southwest of the house has five bays. It contains four French windows and more sash windows. At the rear of the house is another pilastered doorcase with a pediment. The northeast elevation contains a further door, this one surmounted by a fanlight. On the roof of the house is a copper-covered, ogee-shaped cupola, with a weathervane. It stands on a drum containing four two-light Gothic-style windows. Internally, beneath the cupola, is a stone spiral staircase, with a metal balustrade and a wooden handrail.

== See also ==
- Grade II* listed buildings in Cheshire West and Chester
- Listed buildings in Davenham
