= Bostock, Cheshire =

Village in Cheshire, England

Coordinates: 53.214°N 2.491°W

Bostock
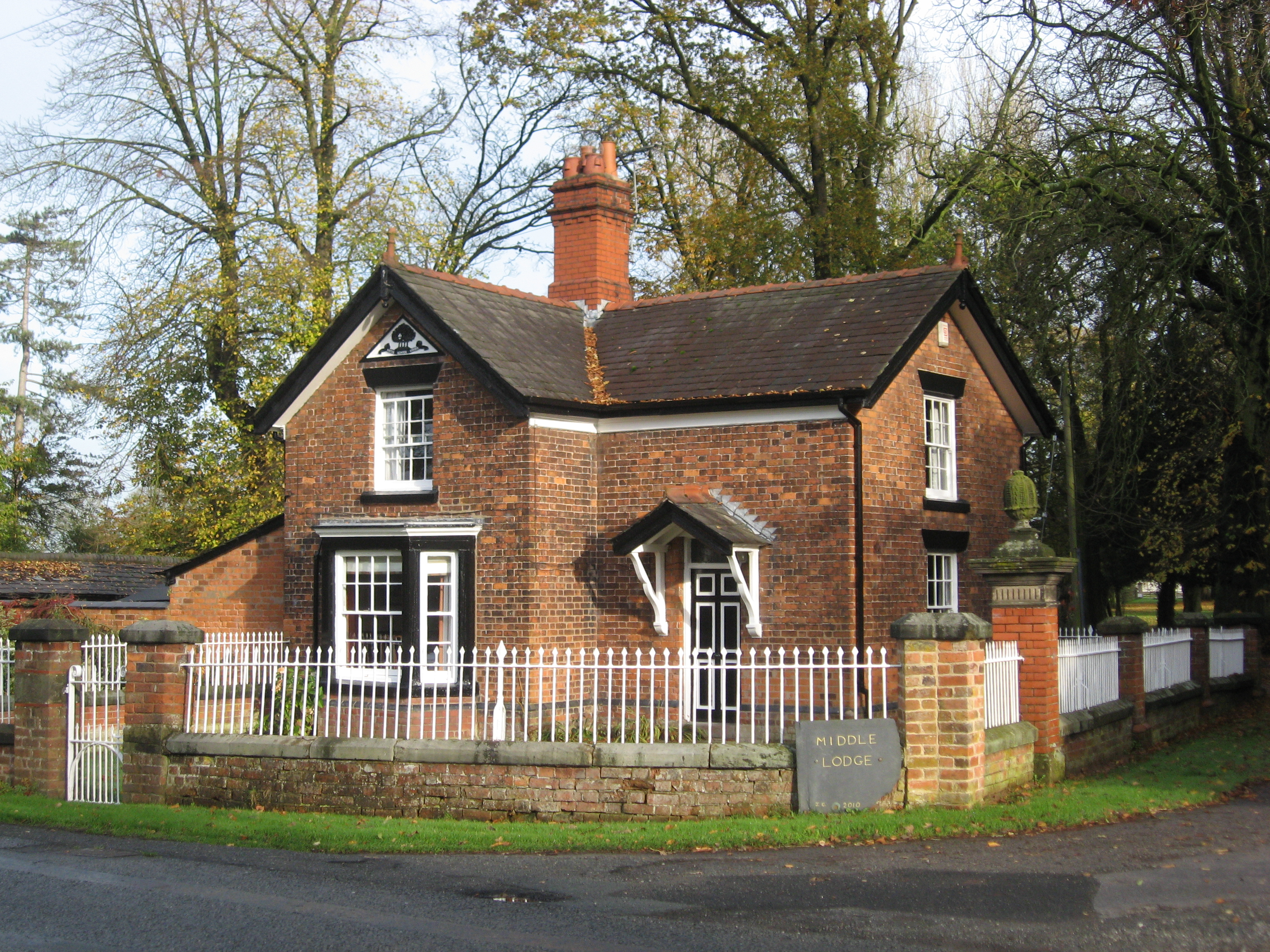
- Middle Lodge, Bostock Hall

- Location within Cheshire
- OS grid reference: SJ673688
- Civil parish: Davenham and Bostock
- Unitary authority: Cheshire West and Chester
- Ceremonial county: Cheshire
- Region: North West
- Country: England
- Sovereign state: United Kingdom
- Post town: MIDDLEWICH
- Postcode district: CW10
- Dialling code: 01606
- Police: Cheshire
- Fire: Cheshire
- Ambulance: North West
- UK Parliament: Mid Cheshire

Bostock is a village in the unitary authority of Cheshire West and Chester and the ceremonial county of Cheshire, England. Bostock was a separate civil parish until 2023, when it merged with Davenham parish. According to the 2001 census Bostock had a population of 229, reducing slightly to 225 at the 2011 Census. The village is between the towns of Winsford and Northwich.

== See also ==
- Listed buildings in Bostock
- Bostock Hall
