= Listed buildings in Byley =

Byley is a civil parish in Cheshire West and Chester, England. It contains three buildings that are recorded in the National Heritage List for England as designated listed buildings, all of which are at Grade II. This grade is the lowest of the three gradings given to listed buildings and is applied to "buildings of national importance and special interest". Apart from the small village of Byley, the parish is entirely rural. The listed buildings consist of the village church, and two houses.

Name and location	Photograph	Date	Notes
Rosebank House; 53.2242°N 2.4155°W	—	Early 18th century	A brick farmhouse with a slate roof in two storeys with an attic. The entrance front has two bays. The windows in the ground and first floors are sashes, and those in the attic are casements.
Ravenscroft Hall; 53.2048°N 2.4456°W	—	1837	A country house that was extended in the 1850s, and in 1877. It is constructed in roughcast and yellow brick, with stone dressings and slate roofs. The house is in two storeys, with a main front of five bays. Features include an Ionic porch, and an Italianate belvedere.
St John the Evangelist's Church; 53.2200°N 2.4172°W		1846	A Commissioners' Church constructed in brick and stone with a terracotta dressings and a tiled roof. It consists of a nave, a chancel, and a southeast tower with a pyramidal cap. There is a bellcote on the west gable.

== See also ==
- Listed buildings in Allostock
- Listed buildings in Bostock
- Listed buildings in Cranage
- Listed buildings in Davenham
- Listed buildings in Lach Dennis
- Listed buildings in Sproston
- Listed buildings in Stanthorne
- Listed buildings in Wimboldsley
