= France-Hayhurst family =

English family

The France-Hayhurst family lived in Bostock Hall near to Middlewich in Cheshire, England from 1775, until the house was sold to the local council in the 1950s. The family were responsible for a number of developments in the area, including the redevelopment of Bostock Green (now a conservation area) between 1850 and 1875. The family last appeared in Burke's Landed Gentry in 1972, as 'Carnegie (formerly France-Hayhurst) of Bostock House'.

The Rev. Thomas France-Hayhurst (1803–1889), the first who adopted the surname, was Rector of Davenham 1839–1884, and Honorary Canon of Chester He was son of the Liverpool merchant Thomas Hayhurst (later Thomas France) (1762–1815). Hayhurst married Elizabeth Cropper, daughter of Thomas Cropper of Everton, and sister of John Cropper (1773–1855), a plantation owner. Thomas France-Hayhurst outlived two brothers with inherited wealth based on West Indian slavery, James France France (1792–1869) and Henry Hayhurst Hayhurst (1806–1875); he added Hayhurst to his surname France to satisfy a stipulation in the will of his brother James.

== Family members of note ==
- Commander Cecil Halstead France-Hayhurst (d. 1915), son of Colonel Charles Hosken France Hayhurst, as below; Royal Navy officer appointed in command of the destroyer HMS Fervent in 1902 as a lieutenant. He later served aboard HMS Illustrious, followed by HMS Patuca.
- Colonel Charles Hosken France Hayhurst (March 10, 1832 – April 7, 1914) Benefactor. High Sheriff of Cheshire, 1879
- Captain William Hosken France-Hayhurst, High Sheriff of Cheshire, 1929

== Coat of arms ==
Escutcheon of France-Hayhurst of Bostock Hall

The coat of arms of the head of the family was: 'Quarterly, 1st and 4th, Hayhurst (per chevron sable and or, in chief two crosses pattée fitchée, and in base a pair of wings conjoined and elevated, counterchanged); 2nd and 3rd, France (argent on a mount in base a hurst proper on a chief wavy azure three fleurs-de-lis or).'
