= Listed buildings in Davenham =

Davenham is a civil parish in Cheshire West and Chester, England. It contains 28 buildings that are recorded in the National Heritage List for England as designated listed buildings. Other than the village of Davenham, the parish is rural, and most of the buildings in the list are domestic or related to farming. Running through the parish are the Trent and Mersey Canal, the River Weaver and the Weaver Navigation, and the West Coast Main Line; there are structures relating to all these in the list. The other listed buildings are the village church and associated structures, two public houses, and a memorial drinking fountain.

== Key ==
Grade	Criteria
Grade II*	Particularly important buildings of more than special interest.
Grade II	Buildings of national importance and special interest.

== Buildings ==
Name and location	Photograph	Date	Notes	Grade
61–65 Church Street; 53.2369°N 2.5070°W	—	Mid- to late 17th century	A row of three houses, the house on the left being added later and dated 1735. The house on the right is timber-framed with brick infill; the central house is pebbledashed but probably also timber-framed; the house on the left is in brick. All houses have slate roofs.	II
Bridge End Farmhouse; 53.2333°N 2.4953°W	—	Mid- to late 17th century	Additions and alterations were made in the 19th and 20th centuries. The building is timber-framed with whitewashed brick infill, and has a tiled roof. It is in two storeys, and has an L-shaped plan. The windows are casements, those in the upper storey being in gabled dormers. The later additions are on the right side.	II
Farm building, Manor Farm; 53.2337°N 2.4825°W	—	Late 17th century	The building was altered in the 19th century. It is partly timber-framed and partly in brick, with tiled roofs. The building has an L-shaped plan, and is in two storeys. Its features include round pitch holes.	II
542 London Road; 53.2329°N 2.5105°W	—	1741	A house in brick with a tiled roof. It is in two storeys, and has casement windows. It has a central porch with a datestone above.	II
Whatcroft Hall; 53.2248°N 2.4809°W	—	1780	A country house, enlarged in 1807, constructed in brick with a slate roof in Georgian style. There are two storeys, with an entrance front of six bays. In the centre of the house is a spiral staircase, above which is a copper-covered, ogee-shaped cupola, surmounted by a weathervane, and standing on a drum containing Gothic-style windows.	II*
Bull's Head Inn; 53.2356°N 2.5106°W		1764	Originally a coaching inn, now a public house, it is constructed in brick with a slate roof. It has three storeys, the original part being in four bays. The windows are casements. There are 19th-century extensions on both sides.	II
Rectory; 53.2367°N 2.5051°W	—	Mid- to late 18th century	Constructed in brick on a stone plinth with a slate roof, the former rectory has a symmetrical five-bay front. The central bay protrudes slightly forward, and has a porch with Roman Doric columns and pilasters, above which is a pediment. The windows storey are sashes.	II
Oddfellows Arms Public House; 53.2358°N 2.5115°W	—	Late 18th century	Possibly originating as a house, the public house is constructed in chequered brick with a slate roof. It is in two storeys, and has a symmetrical three-bay entrance front. The central doorway is flanked by ½ columns, with a cornice and fanlight above. The windows in the upper storey are sashes.	II
Davenham Hall; 53.2324°N 2.5068°W	—	1790s (probable)	A country house, extended in the 19th century, and later converted into a nursing home. It is constructed in stuccoed brick and has a slate roof. The entrance front is in six bays. In the centre is a porch with four Tuscan columns and an entablature containing a triglyph, above which are two windows with a pediment over them, and a parapet on each side. Inside the house is delicate plasterwork, and a central staircase hall lit by a dome.	II*
Davenham Farmhouse; 53.2350°N 2.5161°W	—	Late 18th century or early 19th century	Constructed in brick with a slate roof, the farmhouse is in two storeys, and has three bays. It has a Neoclassical doorcase with fluted pilasters, and an open pediment containing a fanlight. The windows are sashes.	II
Table tomb, St Wilfrid's Churchyard; 53.23713°N 2.50557°W	—	c. 1808	A table tomb in sandstone with marble sides. Its decorations include pilaster strips, acroteria, and foliage. On the tomb is an urn with a flame finial.	II
Milepost; 53.21950°N 2.47995°W	—	1819	A cast iron milepost on the Trent and Mersey Canal. It consists of a circular post, with a moulded head showing the distances in miles to Preston Brook and Shardlow in embossed figures.	II
Milepost; 53.22820°N 2.47594°W	—	1819	A cast iron milepost on the Trent and Mersey Canal. It consists of a circular post, with a moulded head showing the distances in miles to Preston Brook and Shardlow in embossed figures.	II
1 Green Lane; 53.2363°N 2.5129°W	—	Early 19th century	A two-storey house in brick with ashlar dressings and a slate roof. It has a symmetrical entrance front of three bays. In the centre is a doorway flanked by half-pillars, with a cornice and fanlight above. There is a central round-headed staircase window, the other windows being sashes.	II
Bridge Cottage and Canal Cottage; 53.2269°N 2.4762°W	—	Early 19th century	Originating as a single farmhouse, it was later divided into two cottages. The building is constructed in brick with a roof of old slates. It has a T-shaped plan, and is in two storeys. The windows are casements.	II
Lodge; 53.2332°N 2.5098°W	—	Early 19th century	Originally a gate lodge to Davenham Hall, it is constructed in whitewashed stuccoed brick with a slate roof, and is in a single storey. To the left is a bowed wing containing a pedimented doorway. On the right is a recessed bay with a sash window. To the rear and on the right are attached pavilions, probably added in the 20th century.	II
Roseaton; 53.2341°N 2.5203°W	—	Early to mid-19th century	A two-storey house in brick on a rendered plinth with a slate roof. It has a symmetrical three-bay entrance front, and is in two storeys. The windows are sashes.	II
Shipbrook Bridge; 53.23622°N 2.49403°W		Early to mid-19th century	A bridge carrying Shipbrook Road over the River Dane. It is constructed in red sandstone ashlar with a single span. It has a semi-elliptical arch with voussoirs and a keystone. The walls are slight canted on each side, and end in square piers with pyramidal caps.	II
Railway Viaduct; 53.2316°N 2.5372°W	—	1837	Built by Joseph Locke for the Grand Junction Railway (now the West Coast Main Line) crossing the Weaver Navigation. It is constructed in sandstone and consists of five equal arches.	II
St Wilfrid's Church; 53.2372°N 2.5060°W		1842–44	The body of the church was rebuilt in 1842–44 by Edmund Sharpe, the steeple was damaged by lightning in 1850 and repaired to Sharpe's design by E. G. Paley. The chancel and transepts were built in 1870 by Paley and Austin. The church is constructed in sandstone with a slate roof. It consists of a nave and aisles, transepts, a chancel, and a west steeple.	II*
Lock keeper's Cottage; 53.2301°N 2.5392°W		c. 1850	A cottage adjacent to Vale Royal Locks, in sandstone ashlar with a slate roof. It is in two storeys, with a projecting porch on the river front, and mullioned and transomed windows. On the sides are canted bay windows. The cottage was moved to its present site in about 1890 when the large lock was built.	II
School; 53.2359°N 2.5122°W	—	1856–57	Designed as a primary school and a schoolmaster's house by E. G. Paley, this is constructed in red brick with blue brick diapering, ashlar dressings, and a slate roof. The school is in a single storey, and the house in two storeys. The school has two projecting wings, and a tall bellcote with a conical top.	II
Small lock, sluice and swing bridge 53.22883°N 2.54044°W		c. 1860	Part of Vale Royal locks on the Weaver Navigation. The walls are in sandstone, the lock gates are wooden, and the swing bridge is in wood and iron.	II
Lychgate, St Wilfrid's Church; 53.23701°N 2.50635°W	—	Late 19th century	A lychgate at the entry to the churchyard. It has a sandstone plinth, a timber superstructure, and a tiled roof. It includes moulded bargeboards, and a bressumer inscribed with a prayer.	II
Drinking fountain 53.23243°N 2.51033°W		1885 (probable)	A memorial drinking fountain, surrounded by a canopy in yellow sandstone ashlar. The fountain has an octagonal basin, and a fountainhead consisting of a spout rising from a lion's head. The canopy is gabled, and crowned by an octagonal spirelet.	II
Large lock, lock gates and swing bridge 53.2288°N 2.5401°W		c. 1890	Part of Vale Royal locks on the Weaver Navigation. The walls are in sandstone and limestone, the three pairs of lock gates are in wood, and the swing bridge is in wood and iron. The lock gates are moved by a Pelton water turbine.	II
War Memorial; 53.23588°N 2.51187°W	—	1921	The war memorial is in sandstone, and consists of a stepped base, a large rectangular plinth, and a tall slightly tapering plinth. On the plinth is the square shaft of a cross with four equal arms. The cross-head is carved with a foliage pattern and contains a wheel with the monogram "IHS". On the front of the shaft is a carved sword, and at its base is a block carved with foliage. There is an inscription around the top of the plinth. The names of those lost in the First World War are inscribed on the face of the plinth, and on the base is a stone plaque with an inscription and the names of those lost in the Second World War.	II

== See also ==
- Listed buildings in Bostock
- Listed buildings in Byley
- Listed buildings in Hartford
- Listed buildings in Lach Dennis
- Listed buildings in Moulton
- Listed buildings in Northwich
- Listed buildings in Rudheath
- Listed buildings in Whitegate and Marton
