= St Mary's Church, Whitegate =

Coordinates: 53.2199°N 2.5571°W

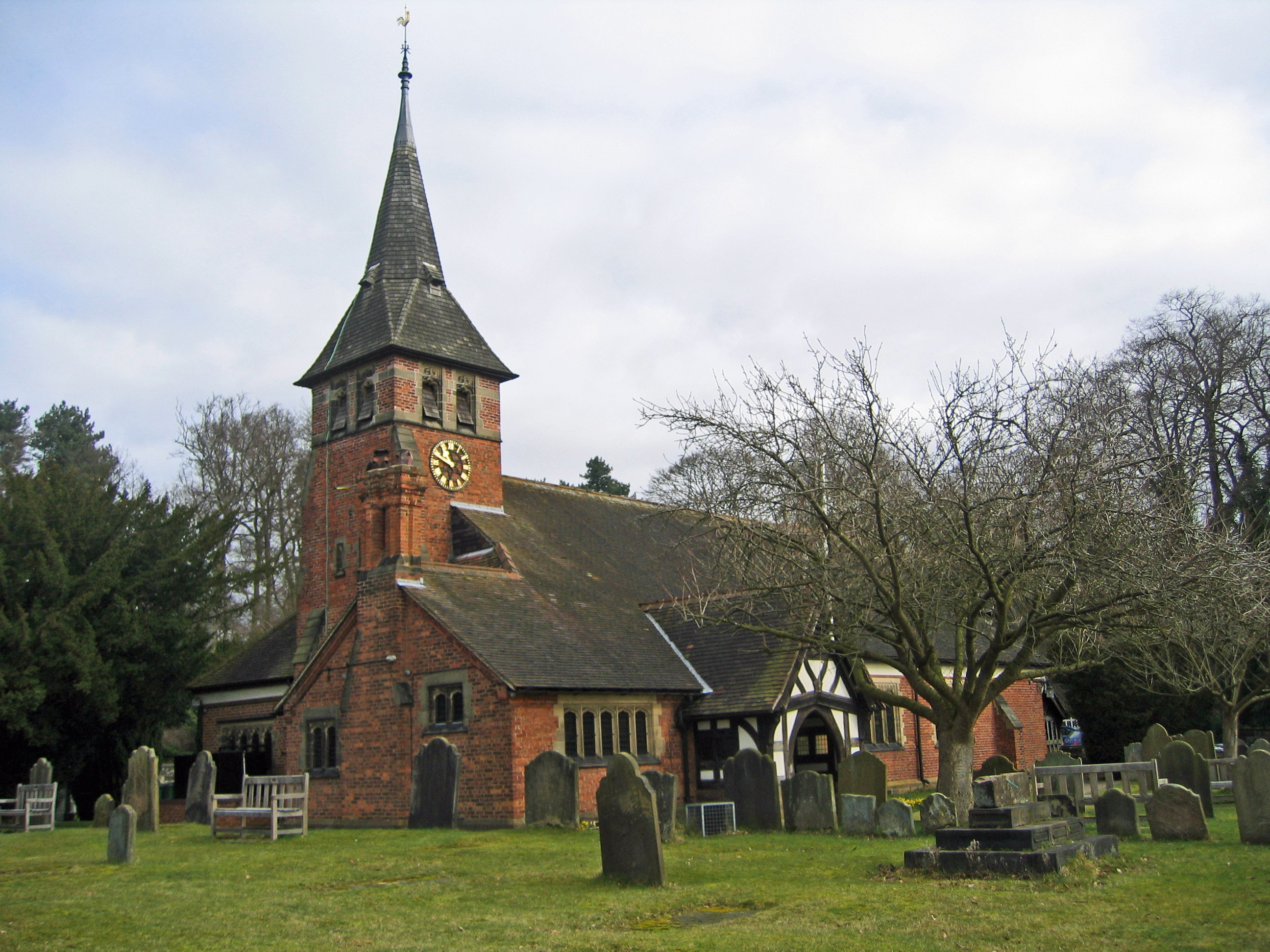
- St Mary's Church, Whitegate, from the southwest

- Location in Cheshire
- OS grid reference: SJ 628,694
- Location: Whitegate, Cheshire
- Country: England
- Denomination: Anglican
- Website: St Mary's, Whitegate

History
- Status: Parish church

Architecture
- Functional status: Active
- Heritage designation: Grade II
- Designated: 11 October 1949
- Architect: John Douglas
- Architectural type: Church
- Completed: 1875

Specifications
- Materials: Brick with tiled roof

Administration
- Province: York
- Diocese: Chester
- Archdeaconry: Chester
- Deanery: Middlewich
- Parish: Whitegate, St Mary

Clergy
- Abbot: Anne Blayney
- Vicar: Canon Paul Dawson Rev Jane Millinchip

St Mary's Church is in the village of Whitegate, Cheshire, England. It is an active Anglican parish church in the diocese of Chester, the archdeaconry of Chester and the deanery of Middlewich. Its benefice is combined with that of St Peter, Little Budworth. The church is recorded in the National Heritage List for England as a designated Grade II listed building. The authors of the Buildings of England series state that the "church is placed so happily against trees on a hillside that it makes the perfect, comforting picture of the Victorian village church".

== History ==
Whitegate Church (Chester) Act 1541
- Act of Parliament
- Parliament of England
- Long title: An Act for the Parish Church of Whitegate to be made a Parish Church of itself, and no Part of the Parish of Over.
- Citation: 33 Hen. 8. c. 32
- Territorial extent: England and Wales

Dates
- Royal assent: 1 April 1542
- Commencement: 16 January 1542 (Note: Start of session.)

Status: Current legislation

Text of statute as originally enacted

A chapel has stood on this site of the present church since the founding of the Cistercian Abbey of Vale Royal in 1277. The Cistercian were known as the white monks and the name of the village at the gate of the abbey refers to this. A reference is made in an act of 1542 (33 Hen. 8. c. 32) to a church at the White Gate of Vale Royal Abbey. There are documentary records relating to repairs to the church between 1602 and 1646. In 1715 the church was a wood and plaster structure in a ruinous condition. Around 1728 the church was rebuilt in brick, the aisles were widened, and the walls of the nave were raised to allow galleries to be built. In 1874–75 the church was rebuilt largely at the expense of Lord Delamere, the architect being John Douglas of Chester. Douglas remodelled the exterior almost completely, but retained much of the earlier internal fabric.

== Architecture ==
=== Exterior ===
The church is built in brick with a tiled roof. Its plan consists of a six-bay nave with aisles, a chancel and a south porch. At the west end is a small tower with an octagonal shingled spire. To the southwest is a vestry.

=== Interior ===
The octagonal timber piers from the previous Perpendicular church have been retained. The reredos and the chancel arcades date from around 1876–77, which the authors of the Buildings of England series are of the opinion are not by Douglas. There is a chime of eight tubular bells that were set up to commemorate Queen Victoria's Diamond Jubilee. A medieval bell was presented to the church by Thomas Cholmondeley in 1810. The parish registers date from 1559.

== External features ==
The gateposts, which are crowned by balls, are dated 1736. The iron gates were given in memory of Miss Emily Katherine Cholmondeley. The churchyard contains the war graves of two soldiers and a Royal Air Force officer of World War II.

== See also ==
- Listed buildings in Whitegate and Marton
- List of church restorations, amendments and furniture by John Douglas
