= Byley =

Village in Cheshire, England

Coordinates: 53.221°N 2.420°W

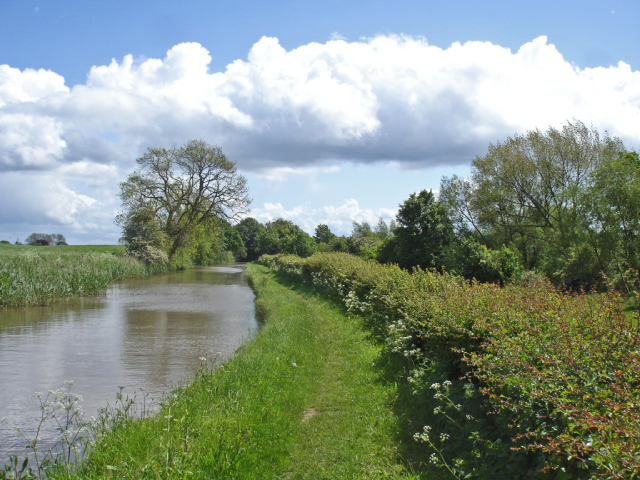
- The Trent and Mersey Canal at Byley

- Location within Cheshire
- OS grid reference: SJ720694
- Civil parish: Byley
- Unitary authority: Cheshire West and Chester
- Ceremonial county: Cheshire
- Region: North West
- Country: England
- Sovereign state: United Kingdom
- Post town: MIDDLEWICH
- Postcode district: CW10
- Dialling code: 01606
- Police: Cheshire
- Fire: Cheshire
- Ambulance: North West
- UK Parliament: Tatton

Byley is a village and civil parish in the unitary authority of Cheshire West and Chester and the ceremonial county of Cheshire, England, about 2 1/2 miles north of Middlewich.

According to the 2001 census it had a population of 202, increasing to 235 at the 2011 Census.

This small village is said to be the 'Heart Of Cheshire'

During the Second World War, Vickers-Armstrongs operated a shadow factory at Byley assembling Vickers Wellington bombers. The completed aircraft were towed to the nearby RAF Cranage airfield to be test flown.

== See also ==
- Listed buildings in Byley
- St John the Evangelist's Church, Byley
