= St Stephen's Church, Moulton =

Coordinates: 53.2227°N 2.5168°W

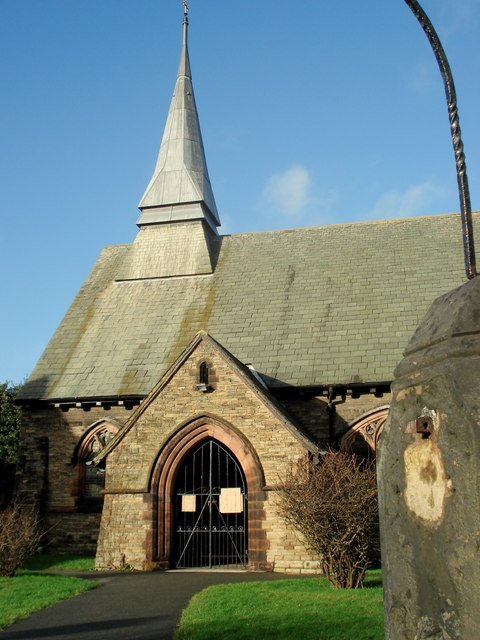
- St Stephen's Church, Moulton, from the south

- Location in Cheshire
- OS grid reference: SJ 655,697
- Location: Moulton, Cheshire
- Country: England
- Denomination: Anglican

History
- Status: Parish church
- Dedication: St Stephen the Martyr
- Consecrated: 16 January 1877

Architecture
- Functional status: Active
- Heritage designation: Grade II
- Designated: 12 March 1986
- Architect: John Douglas
- Architectural type: Church
- Style: Gothic Revival
- Groundbreaking: 1876
- Completed: 1877

Specifications
- Materials: Sandstone, slate roof, lead spire

Administration
- Province: York
- Diocese: Chester
- Archdeaconry: Chester
- Deanery: Middlewich
- Parish: St Stephen the Martyr, Moulton

Clergy
- Vicar: Revd Mark Green
- Priest: Revd Pauline Rowe

St Stephen's Church is in the village of Moulton, Cheshire, England. The church is recorded in the National Heritage List for England as a designated Grade II listed building. and is an active Anglican parish church in the diocese of Chester, the archdeaconry of Chester and the deanery of Middlewich.

== History ==
The village developed with the growth of the salt industry in nearby Winsford and it was decided to have a church in the village. The church was designed by John Douglas and the foundation stone was laid in 1876. In 1877 St Stephen's was established as a separate parish and the church was consecrated on 16 January 1877 by Dr William Jacobson, Bishop of Chester.

== Architecture and fittings ==
The church is built in yellow sandstone with red sandstone ashlar dressings and has a green slate roof with a lead spire. Its style is Gothic Revival. The plan of the church consists of a nave and chancel with a north-eastern transept, a south-eastern vestry and a southwest porch. While the exterior is in stone, the interior is built in two kinds of brick. In the church is a plain sedilia. The stained glass in the east window is by J. C. Bewsey. Elsewhere there is a millennium window by R. N. Bradley. The organ was built in 1876 by Henry Bevington and Sons.

== External features ==
The vicarage in Jack Lane was also designed by John Douglas and is listed Grade II.

== Present day ==
Anglican services are held regularly on Sundays, and baptisms, weddings and funerals are performed in the church. Regular children's and youth activities are also organised.

== See also ==
- Listed buildings in Moulton, Cheshire
- List of new churches by John Douglas
