= Whitegate and Marton =

Civil parish in Cheshire, England

Coordinates: 53.213°N 2.557°W

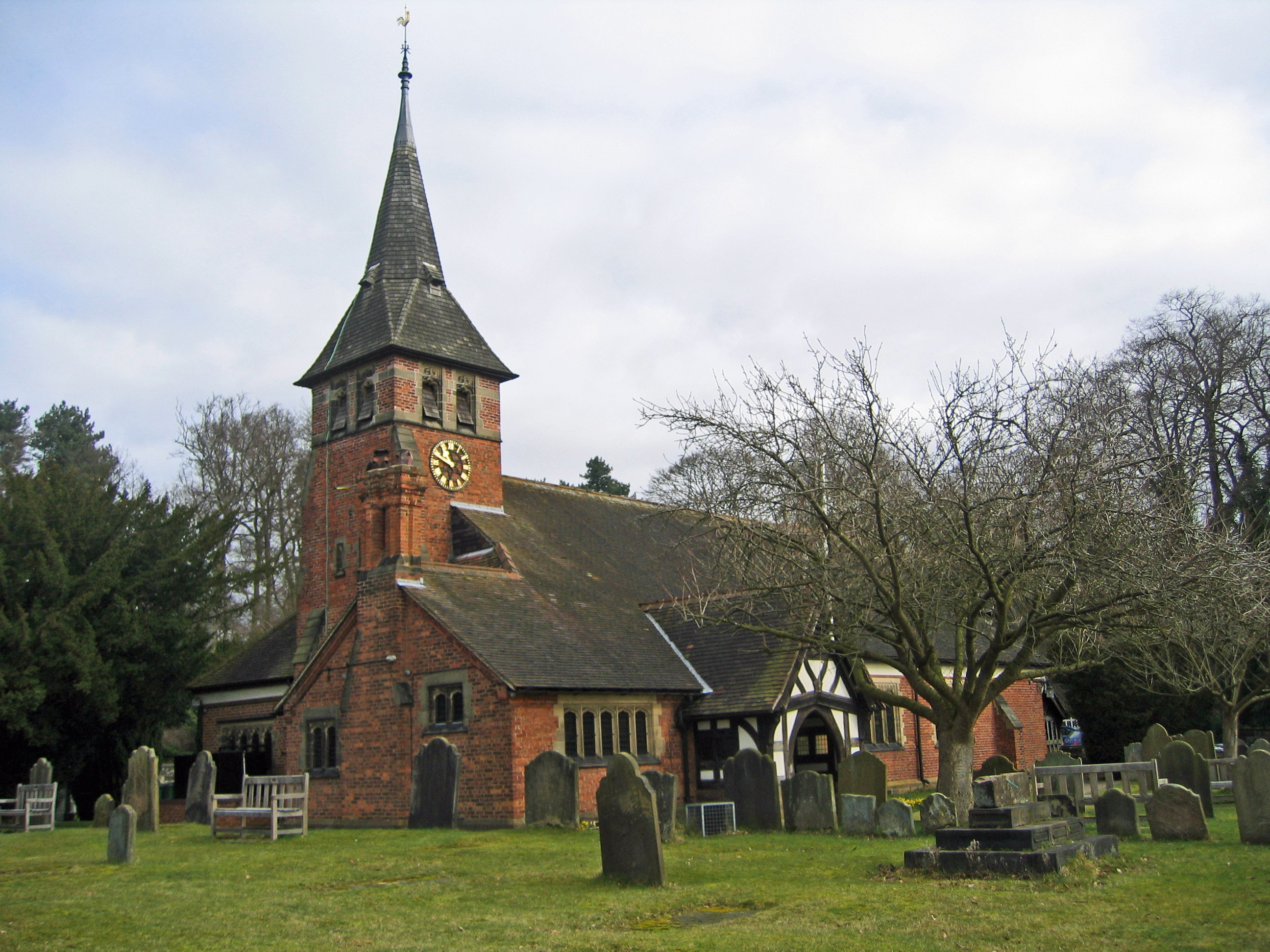
- St Mary's Church, Whitegate

- Location within Cheshire
- OS grid reference: SJ628686
- Civil parish: Whitegate and Marton
- Unitary authority: Cheshire West and Chester
- Ceremonial county: Cheshire
- Region: North West
- Country: England
- Sovereign state: United Kingdom
- Post town: WINSFORD
- Postcode district: CW7
- Post town: NORTHWICH
- Postcode district: CW8
- Dialling code: 01606
- Police: Cheshire
- Fire: Cheshire
- Ambulance: North West
- UK Parliament: Mid Cheshire

Whitegate and Marton is a civil parish in the unitary authority of Cheshire West and Chester and the ceremonial county of Cheshire. The parish has one main settlement of Whitegate and Marton (Winsford), together with the hamlets of Foxwist Green, Marton Green and Nova Scotia.

In 2001 the population of the civil parish was 971, increasing to 1,172 at the 2011 Census.

== See also ==
- Listed buildings in Whitegate and Marton
