= St John the Evangelist's Church, Byley =

Coordinates: 53.2200°N 2.4172°W

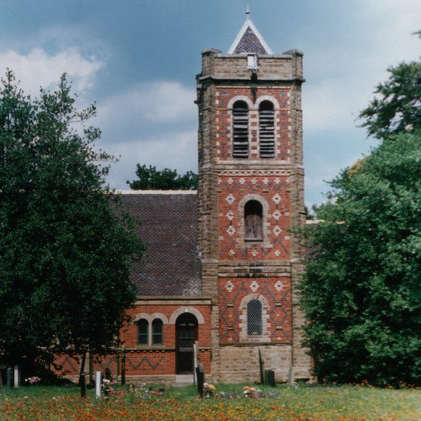
- St John the Evangelist's Church, Byley

- Location in Cheshire
- OS grid reference: SJ 722 693
- Location: Byley, Cheshire
- Country: England
- Denomination: Anglican
- Website: St John, Byley

History
- Status: Parish church
- Dedication: John the Evangelist

Architecture
- Functional status: Active
- Heritage designation: Grade II
- Designated: 2 January 1986
- Architect: J. Matthews
- Architectural type: Church
- Construction cost: £1,000

Specifications
- Materials: Brick and stone Roof of tiles

Administration
- Province: York
- Diocese: Chester
- Archdeaconry: Chester
- Deanery: Middlewich
- Parish: Byley

Clergy
- Rector: Revd Simon Mark Drew

St John the Evangelist's Church is in the small village of Byley, Cheshire, England. It is recorded in the National Heritage List for England as a designated Grade II listed building. It is an active Anglican parish church in the diocese of Chester, the archdeaconry of Chester and the deanery of Middlewich. Its benefice is combined with that of St Michael and All Angels, Middlewich. The architectural historian Nikolaus Pevsner regarded it as being "really very beautiful" with a "minimum of motifs, but a maximum of materials".

== History ==
The church was built as a Commissioners' Church in 1847 to a design by J. Matthews. It cost £1,000 (equivalent to £90,000 in 2025), the Church Building Commission giving a grant of £75 towards this.

== Architecture ==
The church is built in brick and stone with a roof of tiles. Its plan consists of a four-bay nave, a three-bay chancel which is narrower and less lofty than the nave, a north porch and a southeast tower. The tower has a stone parapet and a steep pyramidal roof. On the west end gable is a bellcote. The organ was built in 1860 by the Imperial Pipe Organ Company.

== External features ==
The churchyard contains the war graves of 18 Commonwealth service personnel of World War II.

== See also ==
- List of Commissioners' churches in Northeast and Northwest England
- Listed buildings in Byley
