= Listed buildings in Bostock =

Bostock is a civil parish in Cheshire West and Chester, England. It contains 14 buildings that are recorded in the National Heritage List for England as designated listed buildings. The parish is entirely rural, and incorporates the settlement of Bostock Green, and the country house Bostock Hall. The hall is listed at Grade II*, the other buildings being at Grade II. The list includes the hall and its associated buildings, a farmhouse, a house in Bostock Green, and a milepost.

== Key ==
Grade	Criteria
Grade II*	Particularly important buildings of more than special interest.
Grade II	Buildings of national importance and special interest.

== Buildings ==
Name and location	Photograph	Date	Notes	Grade
Engine house, Bostock Hall; 53.21180°N 2.48678°W	—	18th century	This originated as a stable. It is constructed in brick with stuccoed dressings and a slate roof. It is in two storeys, and has a square plan. The building has a pyramidal roof surmounted by a timber cupola, with an ogee-shaped octagonal dome and a weathervane.	II
Walls of walled garden, Bostock Hall; 53.21072°N 2.48773°W	—	18th century	Additions and alterations were made to the walls in the 19th and 20th centuries. They are constructed in partly rendered brick with ashlar dressings. They form a rectangular enclosure, with central entrances on all but the northwestern side, to which outbuildings were added in the late 19th century.	II
South Lodge; 53.20456°N 2.48383°W		c. 1755	This was originally the lodge to Bostock Hall, and was extended in about 1870, when an upper storey and a wing were added. The lower storey is in brick and the jettied upper storey is timber-framed with rendered infill. The roof is tiled, and the windows are casements. Included in the listing are the railings, gates and gatepiers.	II
Stables and cottage, Bostock Hall; 53.2110°N 2.4867°W	—	c. 1755	Constructed in brick with stone dressings, these were extended in about 1850. The stable is in one storey; the cottage in two. Features in the stable include ventilation slots and a louvred window, and, in the cottage, sash windows, casement windows, and two pedimented gables, each with an oculus.	II
Stable block, Bostock Hall; 53.2112°N 2.4860°W	—	c. 1755	This is constructed in brick on a stone plinth with stone dressings and a slate roof. The entrance front has seven symmetrical bays. The central three bays project forwards, and are in 1½ storeys, the rest being in a single storey. In the centre is an arched doorway, with a Diocletian window above. Elsewhere are sash windows, a clock face, and an octagonal spire with a weathervane.	II
Farm building, Bostock Hall; 53.2117°N 2.4863°W	—	Mid- to late 18th century	The farm building is constructed in brick with ashlar dressings on a stone plinth, and a corrugated asbestos roof. The entrance front is symmetrical and is in 13 bays. The middle three bays and the lateral three bays project forward and each is gabled. In the centre is a louvred bellcote with a shingled roof and a lead finial.	II
Bostock Hall; 53.2103°N 2.4859°W	—	1775	A country house, thought to have been designed by Samuel Wyatt. It is constructed in brick with ashlar dressings and a slate roof. The house has three storeys and a basement, and an L-shaped plan. In the entrance front is a single-storey porch with balustraded parapet. The fenestration includes sash windows, a Venetian window, and a Diocletian window.	II*
Milepost; 53.20807°N 2.48957°W	—	c. 1833	A milepost in cast iron. It consists of a circular post with an ogee-shaped domed top and a curved plate. It gives the distance in miles to Northwich, Middlewich, and Sandbach.	II
Old Hall Farmhouse; 53.2029°N 2.4798°W	—	Early to mid-19th century	The farmhouse is constructed in brick on a stone plinth with a slate roof, and has two storeys and an attic. It has a central porch flanked by pillars. On the entrance front the windows are sashes, with casement windows on the sides.	II
Water tower, Bostock Hall; 53.21080°N 2.48684°W	—	c. 1850	The water tower is built in brick with stone dressings. Its roof is partly shingled, and partly in lead. The tower is in three stages. The top stage has blind cusped tracery, bartizans, and spires. The whole tower is surmounted by an octagonal spire.	II
The Smithy; 53.2193°N 2.4936°W	—	c. 1860	A two-storey house in brick with a slate roof and decorative timber framing in the upper storey. The entrance front is symmetrical in three bays, the central bay projecting forwards. This has an arched doorway, with a jettied upper storey containing a casement window under a gable.	II
Boat house, Bostock Hall; 53.21051°N 2.48770°W	—	c. 1870	The boat house is in brick with ashlar dressings and a tiled roof. It is in two storeys, and its features include a round-headed boat arch, a four-light oriel window, corner pilasters, a timber-framed gable, a gablet with an oculus, and a spire.	II
North Lodge; 53.2161°N 2.4899°W	—	c. 1870	This was a lodge to Bostock Hall, constructed in rendered and whitewashed brick with applied decorative timber framing. The lodge is in two storeys, its original part having two bays, with two further bays added in the 20th century. The timber framing is applied to part of the upper storey, extending into the gables. Other features include dormers on the entrance front, a canted oriel window on the left side, and decorated bargeboards.	II
Gates and screen, Bostock Hall; 53.20972°N 2.48583°W	—	c. 1875	This consists of four square ashlar piers, each of which is capped by an urn and a ball finial. The gates are in wrought iron, and are decorated with floral motifs. The screen consists of wrought iron railings on a stone footing.	II

== See also ==
- Listed buildings in Byley
- Listed buildings in Davenham
- Listed buildings in Moulton
- Listed buildings in Stanthorne
- Listed buildings in Wimboldsley
- Listed buildings in Winsford
