= Moulton War Memorial =

Statue in Cheshire, England

Coordinates: 53.22295°N 2.51535°W

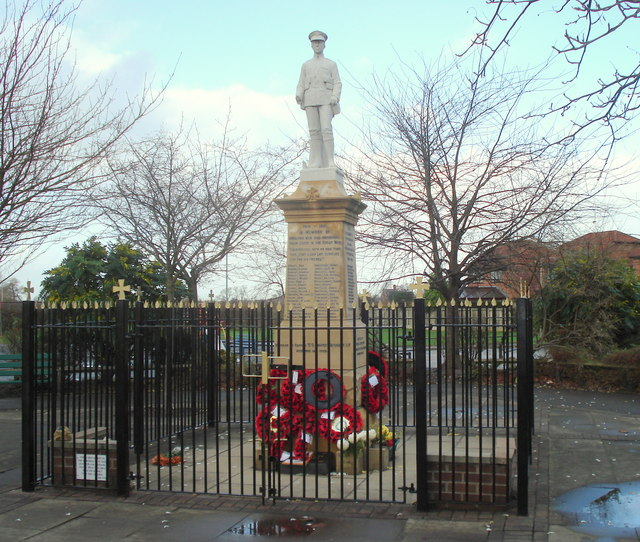
Moulton War Memorial

Moulton War Memorial stands in Main Road, Moulton, Cheshire, England. It consists of a marble statue of a soldier standing on a sandstone pedestal, and is surrounded by a wrought iron fence. The memorial was designed by Samuel Welsby, and unveiled in 1920. It is recorded in the National Heritage List for England as a designated Grade II listed building.

== History ==
At a public meeting in April 1919 it was agreed to form a committee to raise money to create a memorial to commemorate the men of the village who had fallen in the First World War. The land for the memorial was given by Salt Union Limited, and Samuel Welsby was commissioned to design the memorial. It was unveiled on 18 December 1920 by Captain W. H. France-Hayhurst. In 1995 the memorial was moved further back from the road, and was surrounded by paving and by a fence.

== Description ==
The memorial consists of the statue of a soldier in uniform standing on a plinth and a pedestal. It stands about 7 metres (23 ft) high. At the bottom is a square base, on which is another base carved to resemble boulders. On this stands a pedestal with a cornice and a plinth; all these are in yellow sandstone. On the plinth is the marble statue of a soldier. He is in the uniform of the Cheshire Regiment, and is standing at ease, holding a rifle. Behind the soldier is a shattered tree trunk. The memorial is surrounded by paving, and a wrought iron fence consisting of railings and ten posts. It is painted black, and on the posts are crosses painted gold.

The pedestal and the base bear inscriptions. On the south base is the inscription:

UNVEILED BY CAPTAIN W.H. FRANCE-HAYHURST J.P.
DEC 18TH 1920.

Above this on the pedestal is the following inscription:

1914-1919
IN MEMORY OF
MOULTON MEN WHO SACRIFICED
THEIR LIVES IN THE GREAT WAR
"GREATER LOVE HATH NO MAN THAN
THIS, THAT A MAN LAY DOWN HIS
LIFE FOR HIS FRIENDS." (Note: This is a quotation from John, chapter 15, verse 13.)

This is followed, in two columns, by the names of those who were lost.

On the east side of the base is the inscription:

UNVEILED BY
GEORGE A.RISLEY ESQ,
CHAIRMAN OF THE PARISH COUNCIL,
NOVEMBER 2ND 1947.

Above this on the pedestal is inscribed:

ALSO
IN MEMORY OF
THE MOULTON MEN
WHO MADE
THE SUPREME SACRIFICE
IN THE GREAT WAR,
1939-1945.

This is followed by a list of names and the quotation ""THEIR (or THEY) GAVE THEIR ALL."

There is also a plaque in polished granite with gold lettering reading:

V.E. V.J.
THEIR SACRIFICE
OUR FREEDOM
1945 1995

== Appraisal ==
The memorial was designated a Grade II listed building on 12 March 1986. Grade II is the lowest of the three grades of listing and is applied to "buildings of national importance and special interest". There are similar statues on war memorials nearby in Elworth, and in the churchyard of Christ Church, Wheelock. It is not known whether these memorials were also by Samuel Welsby, or whether they represent stock memorial figures.

== See also ==
- Listed buildings in Moulton, Cheshire

== Notes and references ==
Notes

Citations

Sources

- Morris, Edward; Roberts, Emma (2012), Public Sculpture of Cheshire and Merseyside (excluding Liverpool), Public Sculpture of Britain, vol. 15, Liverpool: Liverpool University Press, ISBN 978-1-84631-492-6
- Historic England, "War Memorial, Moulton (1139210)", National Heritage List for England
- Historic England, Listed Buildings
- National Recording Project, Moulton War Memorial (The Cenotaph), archived from the original on 16 January 2014
