= Listed buildings in Moulton, Cheshire =

Civil parish in Chester

Moulton is a civil parish in Cheshire West and Chester, England. It contains three buildings that are recorded in the National Heritage List for England as designated listed buildings, all of which are at Grade II. This grade is the lowest of the three gradings given to listed buildings and is applied to "buildings of national importance and special interest". The listed buildings all date from the 19th and 20th centuries.

Name and location	Photograph	Date	Notes
Vicarage; 53.2235°N 2.5110°W	—	c. 1876	Designed by John Douglas, the house is constructed in red brick with a slate roof. It is in two storeys, and has decorative rendering and brickwork in the gables.
St Stephen's Church; 53.2227°N 2.5169°W		1876–77	The church was designed by John Douglas in Gothic Revival style. It is constructed in red and yellow sandstone, and has a small lead spire. The interior is lined with brick, again in red and yellow.
War Memorial; 53.22295°N 2.51535°W		c. 1920	Designed by Samuel Westby, the memorial consists of a yellow sandstone ashlar plinth carrying the white marble statue of a soldier at ease leaning against a broken tree stump. It is inscribed with the names of those who died, and details of its unveiling.

== See also ==
- Listed buildings in Bostock
- Listed buildings in Davenham
- Listed buildings in Whitegate and Marton
- Listed buildings in Winsford
