= Kingsmead, Cheshire =

Village and civil parish in Cheshire, England

Coordinates: 53.243°N 2.519°W

Kingsmead
- Clocktower in Kingsmead

- Location within Cheshire
- Civil parish: Davenham and Bostock
- Unitary authority: Cheshire West and Chester
- Ceremonial county: Cheshire
- Region: North West
- Country: England
- Sovereign state: United Kingdom
- Post town: Northwich
- Postcode district: CW9
- Dialling code: 01606
- Police: Cheshire
- Fire: Cheshire
- Ambulance: North West
- UK Parliament: Mid Cheshire

Kingsmead is a residential development and civil parish in the Cheshire West and Chester district, Cheshire, England, located on the eastern bank of the River Weaver. South of Northwich and west of Leftwich, the development is a greenfield site and was constructed by Redrow to create 2000 new homes as a suburb of Northwich. The parish was created on 1 April 2011 from parts of Davenham and Northwich. It has a post code starting with CW9.
