= Listed buildings in Whitegate and Marton =

Whitegate and Marton is a civil parish in Cheshire West and Chester, England. It contains 33 buildings that are recorded in the National Heritage List for England as designated listed buildings. One of these, Vale Royal Abbey is listed at Grade II*, and the others are at Grade II. The parish is almost entirely rural, and most of the listed buildings are domestic or related to farming. The older houses and cottages are frequently wholly or partly timber-framed. The River Weaver and the Weaver Navigation run through the parish, and some of the listed structures are related to these waterways. Other listed buildings in the parish include ancient stones, monuments, structures related to Vale Royal Abbey, and St Mary's Church, Whitegate, its gatepiers, and its lychgate.

== Key ==
Grade	Criteria
Grade II*	Particularly important buildings of more than special interest.
Grade II	Buildings of national importance and special interest.

== Buildings ==
Name and location	Photograph	Date	Notes	Grade
Vale Royal Abbey; 53.2247°N 2.5426°W		1277	Once the largest Cistercian abbey in England, much of it was demolished after the Dissolution of the Monasteries when it was converted into a house. The building was extended from 1833 by Edward Blore, and more work was carried out from 1860 by John Douglas. It has since been converted partly into a golf club house, and partly into apartments. The land on which the abbey stood is a scheduled monument.	II*
Long stone 53.20466°N 2.61639°W		Medieval	This consists of a fragment of a wayside cross shaft in red sandstone ashlar. It stands on a modern base consisting of three stones set on a concrete plinth. It is also a scheduled monument.	II
Plague stone 53.20593°N 2.62204°W		Late medieval (probable)	This consists of a square piece of sandstone with a hollowed top mounted on a 19th-century sandstone plinth with chamfered edges.	II
St Mary's Church; 53.2199°N 2.5571°W		15th century	The church was refaced in 1728, when the tower was built. In 1874–75 John Douglas largely rebuilt the church at the expense of Lord Delamere, retaining medieval features, including the octagonal timber nave piers. It is constructed in brick with a tiled roof. At the west end is a tower with a broach spire.	II
Beeches Cottage; 53.2123°N 2.5685°W	—	1600	A single-storey timber-framed cottage with whitewashed brick infill and a tiled roof. To the right of centre is a 19th-century porch. This has red sandstone lower walls, a timber upper part, and a gable with bargeboards. The windows are casements.	II
Vale View Cottages; 53.2062°N 2.5868°W	—	Early 17th century	Two separate cottages, subsequently altered and expanded. The older one is smaller, consisting of a single bay; the other cottage has three bays. They are built in brick with some timber framing, and have thatched roofs. They are in one storey with an attic.	II
Bradford Mill House; 53.2133°N 2.5302°W	—	Early 17th century	A timber-framed farmhouse with whitewashed brick infill on a stone plinth, and with a tiled roof. Additions and alterations were made in the 19th and 20th centuries. It is in two storeys. Some of the windows are mullioned, and others are casements.	II
Old Post Office; 53.2147°N 2.5646°W		17th century	This is a house constructed partly in brick and partly timber-framed with brick infill. The roof is thatched. It is in two storeys, with a two-bay entrance front. At the rear is an extension in painted sandstone. Inside the house is an inglenook.	II
Foxes Green Farmhouse; 53.2121°N 2.5620°W	—	Mid- to late 17th century	A timber-framed farmhouse with brick and wattle and daub infill standing on a stone plinth. Its roof was originally thatched, and was later covered by asbestos sheeting. All the windows date from the 19th century.	II
Keepers Cottage; 53.2232°N 2.5706°W		Mid- to late 17th century	A timber-framed cottage with whitewashed brick infill and a slate roof. It is in two storeys and contains casement windows. To the left is a 19th-century extension in brick painted to appear like timber framing, and a 19th-century lean-to addition on the right.	II
Rookery Cottage and Swan Cottage; 53.2030°N 2.5930°W	—	Mid- to late 17th century	A pair of timber-framed cottages with rendered infill standing on a stone plinth. They are in two storeys, and have slate roofs. The windows in the upper storey are two-light gabled half-dormers. There have been additions and alterations during the 20th century.	II
Briary Farmhouse; 53.2116°N 2.5678°W	—	Late 17th century	A timber-framed farmhouse with whitewashed infill and a slate roof. The house is in two storeys, and has casement windows, one of which is in a dormer. On the left is a 19th-century lean-to.	II
Falcon Cottage and adjacent cottage 53.2059°N 2.5650°W		Late 17th century	Two adjacent houses, timber-framed with rendered infill. The roofs are thatched. The houses are in two storeys. In the lower storey are casement windows; in the upper storeys are dormers, also containing casements.	II
Rivendell; 53.2127°N 2.5703°W	—	Late 17th century	A timber-framed farmhouse with rendered infill and a thatched roof in two storeys. To the right is a single-storey later extension, and to the left is a two-storey extension, both of which are also timber-framed. The ground floor has casement windows, and in the upper storey are dormers.	II
Rookery Cottage; 53.2193°N 2.5789°W	—	Late 17th century	A timber-framed cottage with brick infill and a tiled roof in two storeys. The lower floor contains casement windows, the upper floor has dormers. To the left is a later extension in brick painted to appear like timber framing. To the right is a 20th-century extension.	II
Whitegate Cottage; 53.2190°N 2.5572°W		Late 17th century	This is partly timber-framed with brick infill, and partly in whitewashed brick. It has a thatched roof, and is in two storeys. On the street front are two doorways. In the ground floor are casement windows, and in the upper storey there are dormers.	II
Whitegate House; 53.2192°N 2.5570°W		Early 18th century	Built in rendered brick with a slate roof, the house is in two storeys with an attic. The entrance front is symmetrical, in three bays. In the centre is a gabled wooden porch, with a canted bay window in each side. The lateral bays have gables with bargeboards. The windows are casements.	II
Gatepiers, St Mary's Church; 53.21960°N 2.5572°W		1736	The pair of gatepiers flank the drive in the churchyard of St Mary's. They are square, decorated with panels, and surmounted by cyma caps with finials consisting of ogee shaped stems holding large balls.	II
Monkey Lodge; 53.2263°N 2.5612°W	—	Mid- to late 18th century	A two-storey brick house with a slate roof, extended in 1814. Its exterior is decorated with plaster panels, including one depicting a monkey playing a horn. The windows are casements.	II
Sandiway Bank Farmhouse; 53.2365°N 2.5662°W	—	Late 18th century	A two-storey brick farmhouse with stone dressings and a slate roof. It has a symmetrical three-bay front and sash windows. The doorcase has an open triangular pediment and a fanlight. In the gable ends are lunettes.	II
Abottsmoss Hall; 53.2093°N 2.6120°W	—	c. 1800	A country house constructed in red brick with ashlar dressings and a slate roof. It is in two storeys, and has an entrance front of nine bays. The house has pilaster buttresses and sash windows. On the left side are two canted bow windows.	II
Bark House Farmhouse; 53.2147°N 2.5472°W		Early 19th century	This is a brick farmhouse with a slate roof. It is in three storeys and a basement. The entrance front is symmetrical with three bays and a central doorway. The rear is in five bays, and is almost symmetrical with a doorway to the right of centre. To the right of the house is a 19th-century two-storey addition.	II
Stable block, Vale Royal Abbey; 53.2237°N 2.5438°W		1828	The former stable block has been converted into apartments. It is constructed in red sandstone and whitewashed brick and has a slate roof. The building is in two storeys, with an entrance front of seven bays. There are gables, some of which are shaped.	II
Marton House Farmhouse; 53.1947°N 2.5642°W	—	Early to mid-19th century	A brick farmhouse with ashlar dressings standing on an ashlar plinth. The house has a hipped slate roof, and a symmetrical entrance front of three bays. It has a projecting central porch with a battlemented parapet. The windows are casements. On each side is a single-storey wing, each of which has a battlemented parapet.	II
Nun's Grave Cross; 53.22495°N 2.54135°W		19th century	This consists of a cross, a shaft, and a base that was assembled in the 19th century from sandstone taken from the demolished Vale Royal Abbey. The base is probably from the 14th century, the shaft from the 17th century, and the top from the 15th century. The cross head has niches containing statues of the Crucifixion and saints. It is decorated with crockets.	II
Monument, Monk's Well Cottage; 53.2238°N 2.5398°W	—	1852	The monument to Lady Delamere is an octagonal sandstone structure under an octagonal canopy with a cross on the apex of its roof. It has an inscribed parapet and a copper plaque, also bearing an inscription. The monument has a stepped surround and a wall with low piers.	II
Sluice channel and swing bridge 53.22884°N 2.54069°W		c. 1860	Part of Vale Royal locks on the Weaver Navigation. Originally a lock, it was converted into a sluice channel in about 1890. It has sandstone walls, and a wooden sluice gate suspended from a sandstone bridge with limestone dressings.	II
Small lock, sluice and swing bridge 53.22883°N 2.54044°W		c. 1860	Part of Vale Royal locks on the Weaver Navigation. The walls are in sandstone, the lock gates are wooden, and the swing bridge is in wood and iron.	II
Lodge; 53.2201°N 2.5565°W		c. 1870	Situated at the entrance to Vale Royal Drive, this is a two-storey house in red sandstone with a tiled roof. It has a cross-shaped plan. The entrance front has a projecting central gable above an arched doorway. On the right side is another projecting gable, under which is a single-storey canted bay window. The other windows are casements.	II
Vicarage; 53.2230°N 2.5590°W	—	1878	Designed by John Douglas for Lord Delamere. It is in two storeys, the lower storey being in red brick, and the upper storey timber-framed and jettied at the front. The roof is tiled. Other features include tall brick chimneys, and a canted bay window. The other windows are either mullioned and transomed, or casements.	II
Boundary post 53.22706°N 2.53973°W	—	c. 1890	The boundary post stands beside the Weaver Navigation. It is in cast iron and consists of a circular post with concave and domed top. The top contains a roundel encircling the letters R .W. N. (River Weaver Navigation).	II
Flood gates and sluice bridge 53.22344°N 2.53431°W		c. 1890	The flood gates and sluice bridge are at a point where the River Weaver and Weaver Navigation separate. The walls are in sandstone and the bridge is in cast iron.	II
Lychgate, St Mary's Church; 53.21988°N 2.55680°W		1921	This consists of a timber frame on an ashlar base with a tiled roof. Its gables have decorative bargeboards. There are two bressumers, each of which carries an inscription.	II

== See also ==
- Listed buildings in Cuddington
- Listed buildings in Davenham
- Listed buildings in Delamere
- Listed buildings in Hartford
- Listed buildings in Little Budworth
- Listed buildings in Moulton
- Listed buildings in Winsford
