= Davenham =

Village in Cheshire, England

Coordinates: 53.235816°N 2.511127°W

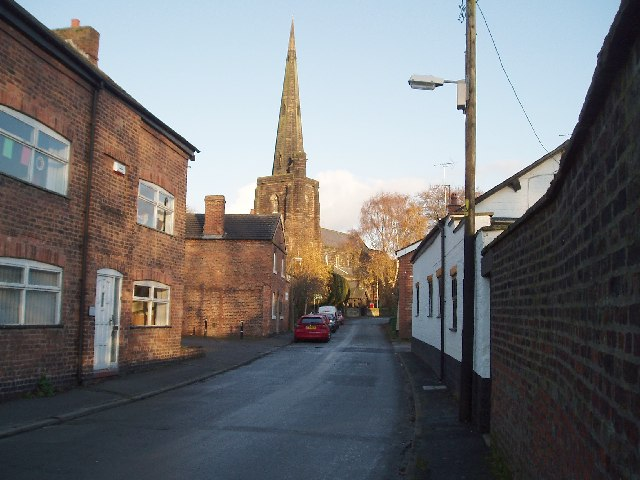
- St Wilfrid's Church

- Location within Cheshire
- Population: 2,745 (2011)
- OS grid reference: SJ658708
- Civil parish: Davenham and Bostock
- Unitary authority: Cheshire West and Chester
- Ceremonial county: Cheshire
- Region: North West
- Country: England
- Sovereign state: United Kingdom
- Post town: Northwich
- Postcode district: CW9
- Dialling code: 01606
- Police: Cheshire
- Fire: Cheshire
- Ambulance: North West
- UK Parliament: Mid Cheshire

Davenham (/ˈdeɪvənəm/; DAY-və-nəm) is a village in Cheshire, England. It is part of the Borough of Cheshire West and Chester. It had a population of 2,745 at the 2011 census. It is in the centre of the Cheshire Plain near both the River Dane and River Weaver.

== Overview ==
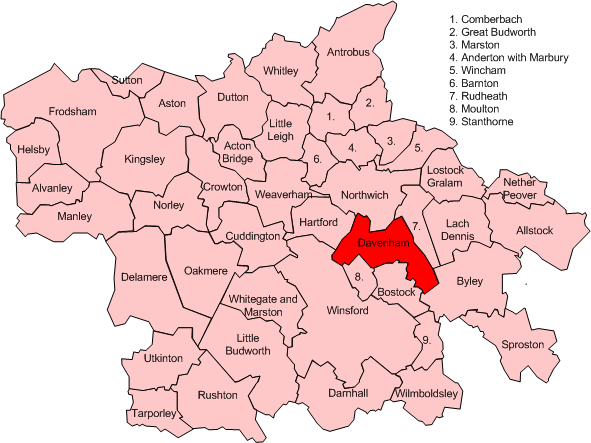
Civil parish of Davenham within the former Borough of Vale Royal

Davenham is recorded in the Domesday Book of 1086 as Devenham. Its name means "hamlet on the River Dane". The site of the Norman Shipbrook Castle by the River Dane is indicated by the name of Castle Hill, between Shipbrook Bridge and Shipbrook Hill Farm, but no traces now remain. In 1936, the whole of Eaton (near Davenham) and part of Leftwich civil parish (which extended into Davenham village) was added to Davenham, and in 1955 part of Davenham was transferred to Northwich civil parish.

Between 1996 and 2006, a large housing development was built on farmland to the northwest of the village centre. The estate is known as Kingsmead and is separated from the historic village of Davenham by the A556 Northwich bypass. This area was originally the Kingsmead ward of the civil parish, with five members on the Davenham parish council. Following a community governance review, Kingsmead became a separate parish with its parish council in April 2011.

In 2006, the Kingsmead Residents' Association was formed by residents who were concerned about the state of maintenance of the public areas of the estate. By Easter 2007 the association had over 500 members and expanded its interests to cover topics such as litter on the estate, speeding on the main spine and loop roads and the adoption of the estate's roads by the County Council. This is in addition to the association's primary aim which was to take over the Estate Management company responsible for the upkeep of the public areas of the estate.

Davenham parish council along with Moulton parish council decided in 2007 to part-fund a Police Community Support Officer (PCSO) to keep a police presence in Davenham and Kingsmead. Due to policing boundaries it was decided that one PCSO from Winsford Neighbourhood Policing Unit would police Davenham and Moulton, whilst a PCSO from Northwich would cover Kingsmead and Leftwich.

In 2023 Davenham civil parish merged with Bostock parish.

The village has a football team Davenham FC, who most notably reached the final of the 1887 Welsh FA Cup.

The church of St. Wilfrid goes back to the Domesday period but the current edifice is the fourth on the site, dating from a major reconstruction between 1844 and 1870 in the Victorian Gothic revival style. The tower has a recessed spire built in 1850. Legend says that the church was founded by St Wilfrid on a journey through Cheshire in the 7th Century, but the first documented evidence of a church on the site is an existing priest and church in 1086.

Davenham's main primary school is Davenham Church of England Primary School. However, the parish now includes parts of the Kingsmead development, which includes Kingsmead Primary School. Both schools are feeder schools to Leftwich's County High School and more distant high schools such as Weaverham High School or The Grange in Northwich.

== Governance ==
An electoral ward in the name of Davenham and Moulton exists, covering much of Davenham and stretching to areas including Northwich and Winsford. The total population of the ward at the 2011 census was 13,565, while Davenham proper had a population of 2,745 (down from 5,655 at the 2001 census due to the creation of a new parish in Kingsmead).

== Notable people ==
- Adam Walton (born 1971 in Davenham), radio disc jockey, presents shows on BBC Radio Wales
- Paula Radcliffe (born 1973 in Davenham), long-distance runner, three-time winner of the London Marathon in 2002, 2003 & 2005.
- Steve Woods (born 1976 in Davenham), former footballer who played in 364 games incl. 249 at Torquay United F.C.

== See also ==
- Listed buildings in Davenham
- Davenham Hall
