= Davenham Hall =

Country house in Cheshire, England

Coordinates: 53.23242°N 2.50682°W

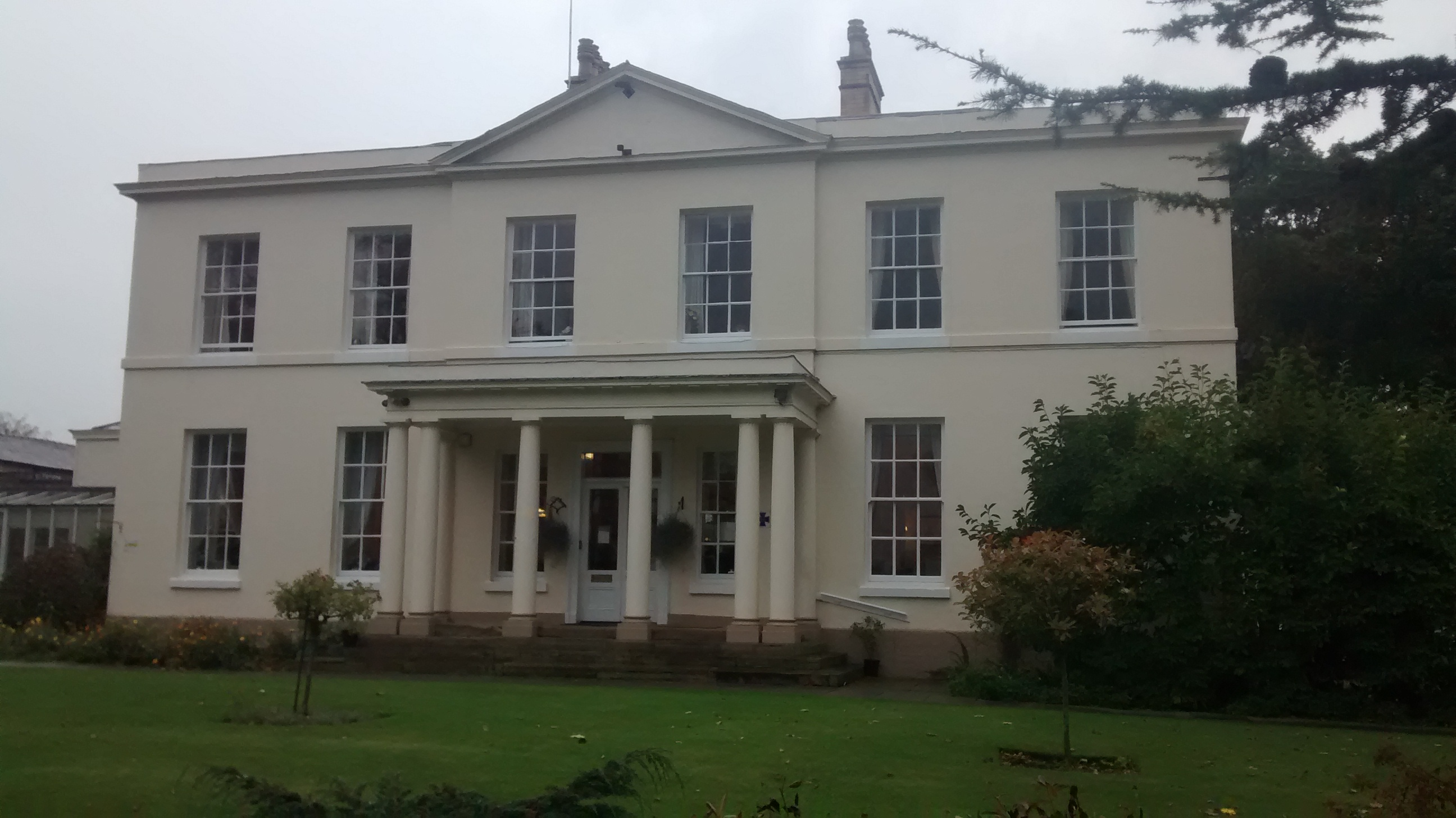
Davenham Hall

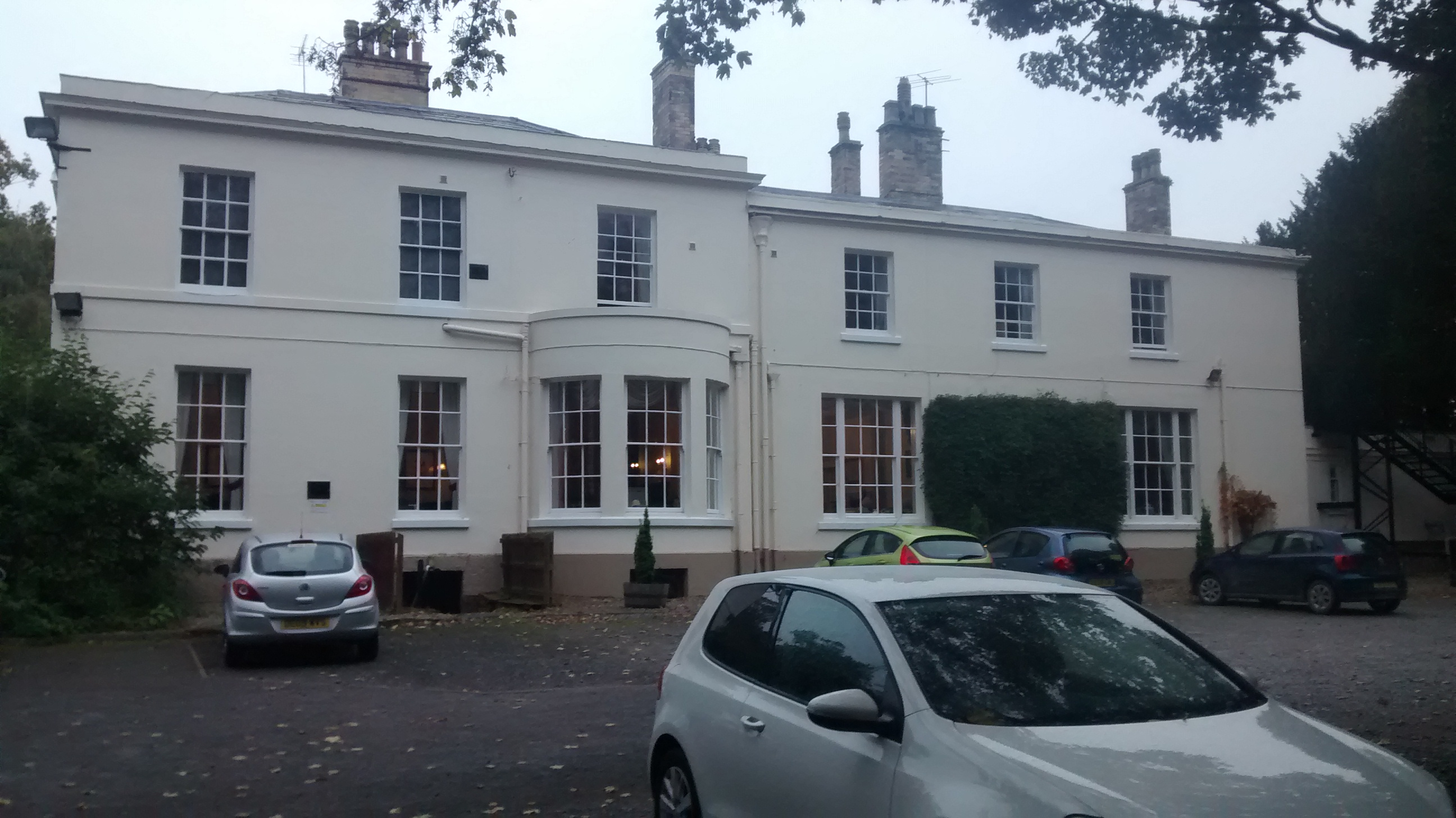
Davenham Hall side

Davenham Hall is a former country house to the southeast of the village of Davenham, Cheshire, England. It was built for Thomas Ravenscroft to replace a timber-framed house called Davenham Lodge. It dates from the middle or the later part of the 18th century, possibly from shortly before 1795, when Ravenscroft died. Substantial additions were made in the early 19th century. It is constructed in stuccoed brick, and has a slate roof. The house is in two storeys with a symmetrical entrance front of six bays. Occupying the middle two bays is a porch with four Tuscan columns and an entablature containing a triglyph. Above this, the central bays protrude slightly forwards and contain two windows, with a pediment above them and a parapet on each side. Figueirdo and Treuherz describe the interior as being "especially fine". The entrance hall contains Grecian plasterwork and a black marble chimneypiece. The drawing room has more delicate plasterwork, and a marble chimneypiece decorated with dancing figures. The central staircase hall is lit by a central dome, and has fan-shaped plasterwork. The staircase has a wrought iron baluster, and the first floor landing has a screen of four Doric columns. The house was converted into a nursing home in 1980. It is recorded in the National Heritage List for England as a designated Grade II* listed building.

== See also ==
- Grade II* listed buildings in Cheshire West and Chester
- Listed buildings in Davenham
