= The County High School, Leftwich =

Coeducational secondary academy in Cheshire

The County High School

Location
- Granville Road; Northwich, Cheshire, CW9 8EZ; England; 53.2416°N 2.5066°W

Information
- Type: Academy
- Established: 29 April 1957 (1978)
- Department for Education URN: 138743 Tables
- Ofsted: Reports
- Chair: Joanne Flower
- Principal: Richard Warburton
- Gender: Coeducational
- Age: 11 to 16
- Enrolment: 1015
- Colours: Claret and blue
- Website: leftwichhigh.com

The County High School, Leftwich, is a coeducational secondary school with academy status, for pupils between 11 and 16 years of age, in Leftwich, Cheshire, England.

== History ==
=== Northwich County Girls' Grammar School ===
The school was established on Monday April 29, 1957 as the Northwich County Grammar School for Girls. Three hundred girls arrived in red and navy uniform. The school was officially opened on Wednesday 16 October 1957. The school cost £184,000.

Miss Sybil Webster, the PE teacher, played hockey for Lancashire, in 1961, and for the England women's national field hockey team from 1964. 16 year old Gina Evans swam internationally for Wales in 1964.

By 1974 there were 975 at the girls' school.

=== Caning incident ===
In June 1976, a 14 year old girl was given three strokes of the cane for eating crisps in a Maths lesson, which attracted national newspaper attention, Lynne Simmonds of Sydney Street, who subsequently moved to Hartford Secondary School. Lynne's parents accused the headmistress, Janet Dines, of assault.

It was dismissed by Vale Royal Magistrates Court on November 12, 1976. Headmistress Janet Dines had played for the Essex county female cricket team, in the late 1950s.

In May 1982, Lynne received £2,216 in compensation from the European Court of Human Rights, when her parents brought a private prosecution, which was not advocated by the National Association of Head Teachers The incident also found its way as a plot device in episode four of Absolutely Fabulous series 1, broadcast in early December 1992.

=== Comprehensive ===
The school became a comprehensive in September 1978, with sixth form pupils from the school and the former Sir John Deane's Grammar School going to the new Sir John Deane's College. The school was later known as Leftwich High School until the early 1990s before becoming the County High School Leftwich.

=== Academy ===
The school converted to academy status on 1 September 2012. The school is in partnership with Sir John Deane's College as part of the Sir John Brunner Foundation.

== Headteachers ==
- 1957 Miss Celia Barker, history graduate of the University of Manchester
- 1965 Miss Janet Dines, who lived in Knutsford, formerly the head of Maths, and the deputy head, of Forest Lodge School in Essex, which became Bower Park School in 1989

== Former teachers ==
- Maths teacher David Reaper, from 1968, born in Sunderland in 1947, attended Robert Richardsons County Grammar School and Sunderland Teachers Training College; he stood in the February 1974 and October 1974 general elections, for Northwich for the Liberals, and later in the 1992 general election for Halton, when teaching at Grange Comprehensive School in Runcorn, and in the 1997 general election for Eddisbury; his wife taught at Wallerscote Junior School in Weaverham, where he lived

== Academic performance ==
The school gets good GCSE results, well above the England average, and slightly above the Cheshire average. Results have steadily improved over the last 6 years. The 2016 Ofsted inspection graded the school as "outstanding" (the highest rating available). In the 2015/16 academic year the school achieved its highest ever result with 86% of students receiving at least 5 GCSEs at grades A*-C. This result put the school as the top rated secondary comprehensive in Cheshire

== Notable former pupils ==
=== Northwich County Grammar School for Girls ===
- Sue Birtwistle, television producer of well-known BBC costume dramas such as the 1995 Pride and Prejudice and the 1996 Emma
- Angela Bostock, soprano with the English National Opera in the 1970s, she later married the bass opera singer Roderick Earle
- Moira Buffini, playwright, film director and actress, who notably wrote the 2010 play Handbagged about Queen Elizabeth II and Margaret Thatcher, and the 2010 film Tamara Drewe
- Diana Johnson, Labour MP since 2005 for Hull North (in attendance from 1977 to 1982)
- Jennifer Saunders, comedian, best known as half of French and Saunders and for the television series Absolutely Fabulous
- Shirley Strong, Olympic hurdler, who won the silver medal in women's 100 metres hurdles at the 1984 Summer Olympics in Los Angeles (attended 1970–75)
- Jennifer Lowe Summers, from Higher Whitley, won Miss United Kingdom on August 9, 1966 at the Locarno Ballroom in Blackpool, aged 20, winning £1,300, took part in Miss World 1966 on November 17, 1966 at the Lyceum Ballroom (won by Miss Yugoslavia, Nikica Marinović, who married film director Zdravko Šotra); she came second in Miss Great Britain 1968 in March 1968, and won Miss England on April 26, 1968 at the Lyceum Ballroom in London, and so took part in Miss Europe 1968 in September 1968

=== Leftwich High School ===
- Tim Burgess, lead singer of English alternative rock band The Charlatans.
- Michelle Donelan MP
