= Leftwich =

Village in Cheshire, England

Coordinates: 53.25°N 2.5°W

- Emmanuel Evangelical Church at Leftwich housing estate

- Location within Cheshire
- Civil parish: Northwich
- Unitary authority: Cheshire West and Chester
- Ceremonial county: Cheshire
- Region: North West
- Country: England
- Sovereign state: United Kingdom
- Post town: Northwich
- Postcode district: CW9
- Dialling code: 01606
- Police: Cheshire
- Fire: Cheshire
- Ambulance: North West
- UK Parliament: Mid Cheshire

Leftwich is a historic village, ward and southern suburb of Northwich in the Cheshire West and Chester borough of Cheshire, England. The name, given as merely 'Wice' in the Domesday Book of 1086, is written 'Leftetewych' in a document of 1278 and derives from 'Leoftæt's wic' (Leoftæt being a woman's name).

Leftwich was historically a manor and township in the parish of Davenham, comprising most of the area between the rivers Weaver and Dane. As well as encompassing the area around Davenham parish church, Leftwich also extended slightly to the north of the River Dane, including the site of the former Northwich Memorial Hall.

In 1866 Leftwich became a separate civil parish. In 1894 the northern half of Leftwich, which since 1880 had formed part of the Northwich Local Board district, was added to the civil parish and urban district of Northwich. On 1 April 1936 the parish was abolished and merged with Davenham, Hartford and Northwich; however, most of the same area was subsequently annexed to Northwich in 1955, following the post-war construction of a large housing estate at Leftwich Green by Northwich Urban District Council. In 1931 the parish had a population of 1021. From 1974 to 2009 it was in Vale Royal district.

The village has two schools: Leftwich Community Primary School and The County High School, Leftwich.

Leftwich is to the east of Kingsmead and to the north of Davenham.
