= Bostock Hall =

Coordinates: 53.21032°N 2.48593°W

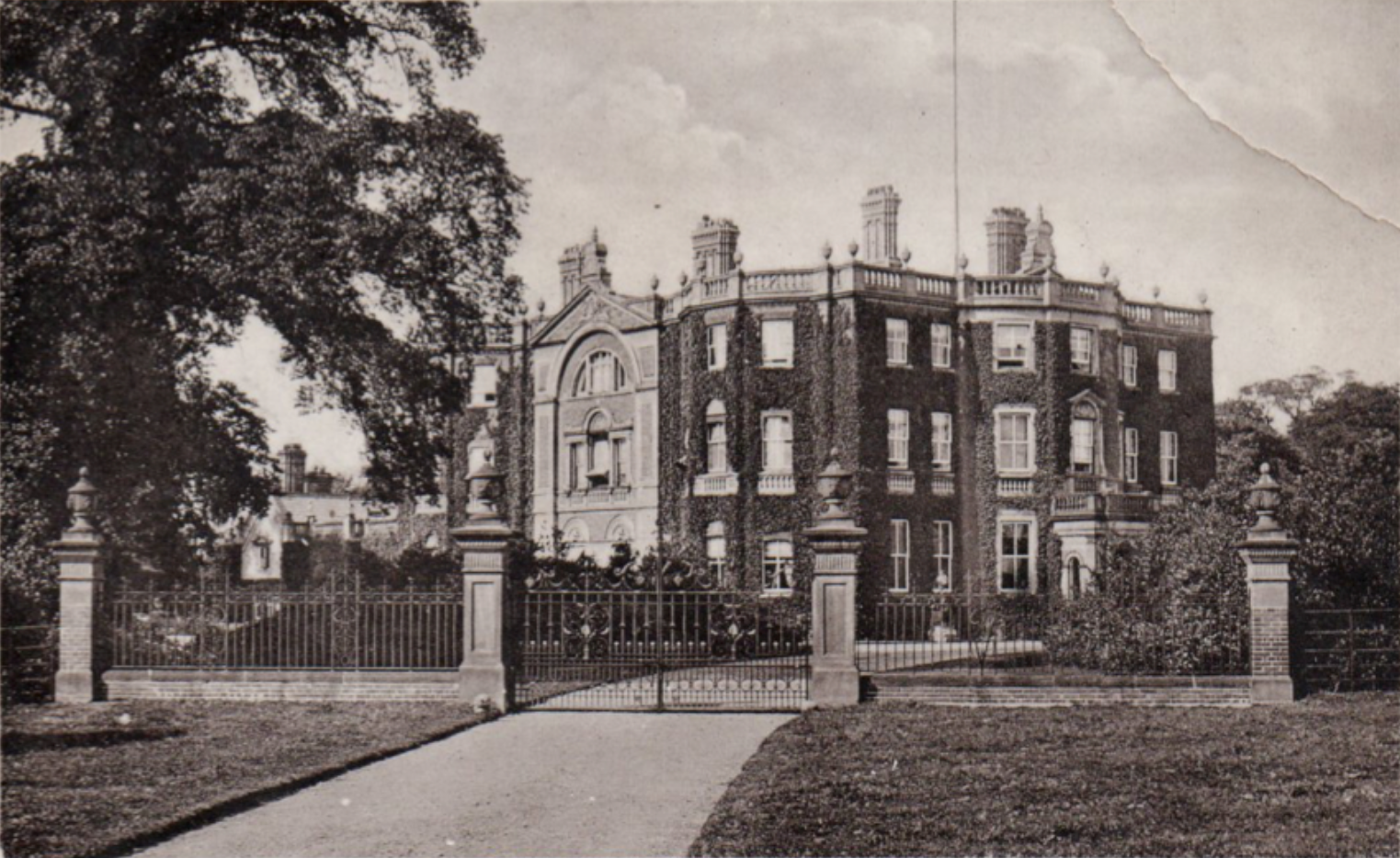
- Bostock Hall
- Interactive map of the Bostock Hall area

General information
- Architectural style: Georgian
- Location: Winsford, England
- Construction started: 1771
- Renovated: 1998-1999

Design and construction
- Architect: Samuel Wyatt

Renovating team
- Architect: P J Livesey

Website
- https://bostockhallestate.com/about

Listed Building – Grade II*
- Official name: Bostock Hall
- Designated: 10 March 1953
- Reference no.: 1138416

Bostock Hall is a country house to the northeast of Winsford, Cheshire, England. A former Georgian house, it was rebuilt in 1775 for Edward Tomkinson. It is thought that the architect was Samuel Wyatt.

Alterations and additions were made to it in the middle of the 19th century and in 1875. The house is constructed in brick with ashlar dressings; it has a slate roof. It is in three storeys plus a basement. Its plan is L-shaped. The entrance front has a central bow window rising through all floors, and a single-storey porch with a balustraded parapet.

The garden front has two bows, between which are a Venetian window with a Diocletian window above. The house is recorded in the National Heritage List for England as a designated Grade II* listed building.

== See also ==
- Grade II* listed buildings in Cheshire West and Chester
- Listed buildings in Bostock
