= Civil parishes in Cheshire =

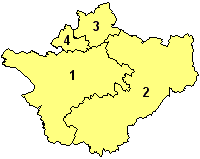
A map of Cheshire, showing the Boroughs : (1) Cheshire West and Chester; (2) Cheshire East; (3) Warrington; and (4) Halton.

A civil parish is a country subdivision, forming the lowest unit of local government in England. There are 333 civil parishes in the ceremonial county of Cheshire, most of the county being parished. Cheshire East unitary authority is entirely parished. At the 2001 census, there were 565,259 people living in 332 parishes, accounting for 57.5 per cent of the county's population.

== History ==
Parishes arose from Church of England divisions, and were originally purely ecclesiastical divisions. Over time they acquired civil administration powers.

The Highways Act 1555 made parishes responsible for the upkeep of roads. Every adult inhabitant of the parish was obliged to work four days a year on the roads, providing their own tools, carts and horses; the work was overseen by an unpaid local appointee, the Surveyor of Highways.

The poor were looked after by the monasteries, until their dissolution. In 1572, magistrates were given power to 'survey the poor' and impose taxes for their relief. This system was made more formal by the Poor Law Act 1601, which made parishes responsible for administering the Poor Law; overseers were appointed to charge a rate to support the poor of the parish. The 19th century saw an increase in the responsibility of parishes, although the Poor Law powers were transferred to Poor Law Unions. The Public Health Act 1872 grouped parishes into Rural Sanitary Districts, based on the Poor Law Unions; these subsequently formed the basis for Rural Districts.

Parishes were run by vestries, meeting annually to appoint officials, and were generally identical to ecclesiastical parishes, although some townships in large parishes administered the Poor Law themselves; under the Divided Parishes and Poor Law Amendment Act 1882, all extra-parochial areas and townships that levied a separate rate became independent civil parishes.

Civil parishes in their modern sense date from the Local Government Act 1894, which abolished vestries; established elected parish councils in all rural parishes with more than 300 electors; grouped rural parishes into Rural Districts; and aligned parish boundaries with county and borough boundaries. Urban civil parishes continued to exist, and were generally coterminous with the Urban District, Municipal Borough or County Borough in which they were situated; many large towns contained a number of parishes, and these were usually merged into one. Parish councils were not formed in urban areas, and the only function of the parish was to elect guardians to Poor Law Unions; with the abolition of the Poor Law system in 1930 the parishes had only a nominal existence.

The Local Government Act 1972 retained civil parishes in rural areas, and many former Urban Districts and Municipal Boroughs that were being abolished, were replaced by new successor parishes; urban areas that were considered too large to be single parishes became unparished areas.

== The current position ==
Recent governments have encouraged the formation of town and parish councils in unparished areas, and the Local Government and Rating Act 1997 gave local residents the right to demand the creation of a new civil parish.

A parish council can become a town council unilaterally, simply by resolution; and a civil parish can also gain city status, but only if that is granted by the Crown. The chairman of a town or city council is called a mayor. The Local Government and Public Involvement in Health Act 2007 introduced alternative names: a parish council can now choose to be called a community; village; or neighbourhood council.

Civil parishes with town status

== List of civil parishes and unparished areas ==
Image	Name	Status	Population	District	Former local authority	Refs
	Adlington	Civil parish	1,081	Cheshire East	Macclesfield; Rural District	
	Alderley Edge	Civil parish	4,409	Cheshire East	Alderley Edge; Urban District	
	Alpraham and Calveley	Civil parish	642	Cheshire East	Nantwich; Rural District	
	Alsager	Town	12,578	Cheshire East	Alsager; Urban District	
	Arclid	Civil parish	199	Cheshire East	Congleton; Rural District	
	Ashley	Civil parish	261	Cheshire East	Bucklow; Rural District	
	Aston by Budworth	Civil parish	281	Cheshire East	Bucklow; Rural District	
	Aston juxta Mondrum	Civil parish	133	Cheshire East	Nantwich; Rural District	
	Audlem	Civil parish	1,790	Cheshire East	Nantwich; Rural District	
	Austerson	Civil parish	145	Cheshire East	Nantwich; Rural District	
	Baddiley	Civil parish	226	Cheshire East	Nantwich; Rural District	
	Baddington	Civil parish	98	Cheshire East	Nantwich; Rural District	
	Barthomley	Civil parish	202	Cheshire East	Nantwich; Rural District	
	Betchton	Civil parish	620	Cheshire East	Congleton; Rural District	
	Bexton	Civil parish	9	Cheshire East	Bucklow; Rural District	
	Bickerton	Civil parish	234	Cheshire East	Nantwich; Rural District	
	Bollington	Town	7,095	Cheshire East	Bollington; Urban District	
	Bosley	Civil parish	406	Cheshire East	Macclesfield; Rural District	
	Bradwall	Civil parish	166	Cheshire East	Congleton; Rural District	
	Brereton	Civil parish	1,012	Cheshire East	Congleton; Rural District	
	Brindley	Civil parish	134	Cheshire East	Nantwich; Rural District	
	Broomhall	Civil parish	206	Cheshire East	Nantwich; Rural District	
	Buerton	Civil parish	492	Cheshire East	Nantwich; Rural District	
	Bulkeley and Ridley	Civil parish	360	Cheshire East	Nantwich; Rural District	
	Bunbury	Civil parish	1,308	Cheshire East	Nantwich; Rural District	
	Burland and Acton	Civil parish		Cheshire East	Nantwich; Rural District	
	Chelford	Civil parish	1,254	Cheshire East	Macclesfield; Rural District	
	Cholmondeley	Civil parish	136	Cheshire East	Nantwich; Rural District	
	Cholmondeston	Civil parish	153	Cheshire East	Nantwich; Rural District	
	Chorley	Civil parish	100	Cheshire East	Nantwich; Rural District	
	Chorley	Civil parish	399	Cheshire East	Macclesfield; Rural District	
	Church Lawton	Civil parish	2,201	Cheshire East	Congleton; Rural District	
	Church Minshull	Civil parish	431	Cheshire East	Nantwich; Rural District	
	Congleton	Town	25,750	Cheshire East	Congleton; Municipal Borough	
	Coole Pilate	Civil parish	60	Cheshire East	Nantwich; Rural District	
	Cranage	Civil parish	1,130	Cheshire East	Congleton; Rural District	
	Crewe	Town	48,592	Cheshire East	Crewe; Municipal Borough	
	Disley	Civil parish	4,301	Cheshire East	Disley; Rural District	
	Dodcott cum Wilkesley	Civil parish	380	Cheshire East	Nantwich; Rural District	
	Doddington and District	Civil parish		Cheshire East	Nantwich; Rural District	
	Eaton	Civil parish	289	Cheshire East	Macclesfield; Rural District	
	Egerton	Civil parish	81	Cheshire East	Nantwich; Rural District	
	Faddiley	Civil parish	163	Cheshire East	Nantwich; Rural District	
	Gawsworth	Civil parish	1,673	Cheshire East	Macclesfield; Rural District	
	Goostrey	Civil parish	2,201	Cheshire East	Congleton; Rural District	
	Great Warford	Civil parish	615	Cheshire East	Macclesfield; Rural District	
	Handforth	Civil parish	6,266	Cheshire East	Wilmslow Urban District	
	Hankelow	Civil parish	272	Cheshire East	Nantwich; Rural District	
	Haslington	Civil parish	6,781	Cheshire East	Nantwich; Rural District	
	Hassall	Civil parish	281	Cheshire East	Congleton; Rural District	
	Hatherton	Civil parish	344	Cheshire East	Nantwich; Rural District	
	Haughton	Civil parish	223	Cheshire East	Nantwich; Rural District	
	Henbury	Civil parish	594	Cheshire East	Macclesfield; Rural District	
	High Legh	Civil parish	1,632	Cheshire East	Bucklow; Rural District	
	Higher Hurdsfield	Civil parish	688	Cheshire East	Macclesfield; Rural District	
	Holmes Chapel	Civil parish	5,669	Cheshire East	Congleton; Rural District	
	Hough and Chorlton	Civil parish		Cheshire East	Nantwich; Rural District	
	Hulme Walfield	Civil parish	140	Cheshire East	Congleton; Rural District	
	Kettleshulme and Lyme Handley	Civil parish	466	Cheshire East	Macclesfield; Rural District	
	Knutsford	Town	12,656	Cheshire East	Knutsford; Urban District	
	Leighton	Civil parish	4,863	Cheshire East	Nantwich; Rural District	
	Little Bollington with Agden	Civil parish		Cheshire East	Bucklow; Rural District	
	Little Warford	Civil parish	275	Cheshire East	Bucklow; Rural District	
	Lower Withington	Civil parish	492	Cheshire East	Macclesfield; Rural District	
	Macclesfield	Town	49,531	Cheshire East	Macclesfield; Municipal Borough	
	Macclesfield Forest and Wildboarclough	Civil parish	201	Cheshire East	Macclesfield; Rural District	
	Marbury and District	Civil parish	510	Cheshire East	Nantwich; Rural District	
	Marthall	Civil parish	165	Cheshire East	Bucklow; Rural District	
	Marton	Civil parish	222	Cheshire East	Macclesfield; Rural District	
	Mere	Civil parish	601	Cheshire East	Bucklow; Rural District	
	Middlewich	Town	13,101	Cheshire East	Middlewich; Urban District	
	Millington and Rostherne	Civil parish	439	Cheshire East	Bucklow; Rural District	
	Minshull Vernon	Civil parish	224	Cheshire East	Nantwich; Rural District	
	Mobberley	Civil parish	2,546	Cheshire East	Bucklow; Rural District	
	Moreton cum Alcumlow	Civil parish	150	Cheshire East	Congleton; Rural District	
	Moston	Civil parish	375	Cheshire East	Congleton; Rural District	
	Mottram St Andrew	Civil parish	629	Cheshire East	Macclesfield; Rural District	
	Nantwich	Town	12,515	Cheshire East	Nantwich; Urban District	
	Nether Alderley	Civil parish	571	Cheshire East	Macclesfield; Rural District	
	Newbold Astbury	Civil parish	475	Cheshire East	Congleton; Rural District	
	Newhall	Civil parish	669	Cheshire East	Nantwich; Rural District	
	North Rode	Civil parish	178	Cheshire East	Macclesfield; Rural District	
	Odd Rode	Civil parish	5,552	Cheshire East	Congleton; Rural District	
	Ollerton	Civil parish	323	Cheshire East	Bucklow; Rural District	
	Over Alderley	Civil parish	335	Cheshire East	Macclesfield; Rural District	
	Peckforton	Civil parish	116	Cheshire East	Nantwich; Rural District	
	Peover Inferior	Civil parish	102	Cheshire East	Bucklow; Rural District	
	Peover Superior and Snelson	Civil parish	815	Cheshire East	Bucklow; Rural DistrictMacclesfield; Rural District	
	Pickmere	Civil parish	541	Cheshire East	Bucklow; Rural District	
	Plumley	Civil parish	649	Cheshire East	Bucklow; Rural District	
	Poole	Civil parish	101	Cheshire East	Nantwich; Rural District	
	Pott Shrigley	Civil parish	220	Cheshire East	Macclesfield; Rural District	
	Poynton-with-Worth	Town	14,433	Cheshire East	Macclesfield; Rural District	
	Prestbury	Civil parish	3,324	Cheshire East	Macclesfield; Rural District	
	Rainow	Civil parish	1,282	Cheshire East	Macclesfield; Rural District	
	Rope	Civil parish	2,155	Cheshire East	Nantwich; Rural District	
	Sandbach	Town	17,630	Cheshire East	Sandbach; Urban District	
	Shavington cum Gresty	Civil parish	4,849	Cheshire East	Nantwich; Rural District	
	Siddington	Civil parish	376	Cheshire East	Macclesfield; Rural District	
	Smallwood	Civil parish	491	Cheshire East	Congleton; Rural District	
	Somerford	Civil parish	343	Cheshire East	Congleton; Rural District	
	Somerford Booths	Civil parish	175	Cheshire East	Congleton; Rural District	
	Sound	Civil parish	233	Cheshire East	Nantwich; Rural District	
	Spurstow	Civil parish	394	Cheshire East	Nantwich; Rural District	
	Stapeley and District	Civil parish	1,084	Cheshire East	Nantwich; Rural District	
	Stoke and Hurleston	Civil parish	357	Cheshire East	Nantwich; Rural District	
	Styal	Civil parish	1,051	Cheshire East	Wilmslow Urban District	
	Sutton	Civil parish	2,464	Cheshire East	Macclesfield; Rural District	
	Swettenham	Civil parish	248	Cheshire East	Congleton; Rural District	
	Tabley Inferior	Civil parish	137	Cheshire East	Bucklow; Rural District	
	Tabley Superior	Civil parish	316	Cheshire East	Bucklow; Rural District	
	Toft	Civil parish	81	Cheshire East	Bucklow; Rural District	
	Twemlow	Civil parish	168	Cheshire East	Congleton; Rural District	
	Walgherton	Civil parish	121	Cheshire East	Nantwich; Rural District	
	Wardle	Civil parish	181	Cheshire East	Nantwich; Rural District	
	Warmingham	Civil parish	175	Cheshire East	Nantwich; Rural District	
	Weston and Crewe Green	Civil parish		Cheshire East	Nantwich; Rural District	
	Wettenhall	Civil parish	135	Cheshire East	Nantwich; Rural District	
	Willaston	Civil parish	2,973	Cheshire East	Nantwich; Rural District	
	Wilmslow	Town	30,326	Cheshire East	Wilmslow Urban District	
	Wincle	Civil parish	164	Cheshire East	Macclesfield; Rural District	
	Wistaston	Civil parish	8,222	Cheshire East	Nantwich; Rural District	
	Woolstanwood	Civil parish	723	Cheshire East	Nantwich; Rural District	
	Worleston	Civil parish	404	Cheshire East	Nantwich; Rural District	
	Wrenbury cum Frith	Civil parish	1,060	Cheshire East	Nantwich; Rural District	
	Wybunbury	Civil parish	1,474	Cheshire East	Nantwich; Rural District	
	Daresbury	Civil parish	216	Halton	Runcorn; Rural District	
	Hale	Civil parish	1,898	Halton	Whiston; Rural District	
	Halebank	Civil parish	1,046	Halton	Widnes; Municipal Borough	
	Moore	Civil parish	807	Halton	Runcorn; Rural District	
	Preston Brook	Civil parish	716	Halton	Runcorn; Rural District	
	Runcorn	Unparished area	58,503	Halton	Runcorn; Urban District	
	Sandymoor	Civil parish	1,761	Halton	Runcorn; Urban District	
	Widnes	Unparished area	53,261	Halton	Widnes; Municipal Borough	
	Appleton	Civil parish	10,477	Warrington	Runcorn; Rural District	
	Birchwood	Town	11,395	Warrington	Warrington; Rural District	
	Burtonwood and Westbrook	Civil parish	11,265	Warrington	Warrington; Rural District	
	Croft	Civil parish	2,920	Warrington	Warrington; Rural District	
	Cuerdley	Civil parish	105	Warrington	Warrington; Rural District	
	Culcheth and Glazebury	Civil parish	8,534	Warrington	Golborne; Urban District	
	Grappenhall and Thelwall	Civil parish	9,377	Warrington	Runcorn; Rural District	
	Great Sankey	Civil parish	24,211	Warrington	Warrington; Rural District	
	Hatton	Civil parish	316	Warrington	Runcorn; Rural District	
	Lymm	Civil parish	10,552	Warrington	Lymm; Urban District	
	Penketh	Civil parish	8,699	Warrington	Warrington; Rural District	
	Poulton-with-Fearnhead	Civil parish	17,019	Warrington	Warrington; Rural District	
	Rixton-with-Glazebrook	Civil parish	1,884	Warrington	Warrington; Rural District	
	Stockton Heath	Civil parish	6,396	Warrington	Runcorn; Rural District	
	Stretton	Civil parish	1,009	Warrington	Runcorn; Rural District	
	Walton	Civil parish	1,594	Warrington	Runcorn; Rural District	
	Warrington	Unparished area	53,093	Warrington	Warrington; County Borough	
	Winwick	Civil parish	4,366	Warrington	Warrington; Rural District	
	Woolston	Civil parish	7,868	Warrington	Warrington; Rural District	

== Cheshire West and Chester ==
The former Chester County Borough and parts of the former Ellesmere Port Municipal Borough and Neston Urban District are unparished.

- Acton Bridge
- Agden
- Aldersey
- Aldford and Saighton
- Allostock
- Alvanley
- Anderton with Marbury
- Antrobus
- Ashton Hayes and Horton-cum-Peel
- Aston
- Bache
- Backford
- Barnton
- Barrow
- Barton
- Beeston
- Bostock
- Broxton
- Burwardsley
- Byley
- Capenhurst
- Carden
- Chester Castle
- Chidlow
- Chorlton
- Chowley
- Christleton
- Churton
- Clotton Hoofield
- Clutton
- Coddington
- Comberbach
- Croughton
- Crowton
- Cuddington (near Eddisbury)
- Cuddington (near Malpas)
- Darnhall
- Davenham
- Delamere and Oakmere
- Dodleston
- Duckington
- Duddon and Burton
- Dunham-on-the-Hill and Hapsford
- Dutton
- Eaton and Eccleston
- Elton
- Farndon
- Frodsham
- Golborne David
- Great Boughton
- Great Budworth
- Guilden Sutton
- Handley
- Hargrave and Huxley
- Hartford
- Harthill
- Helsby
- Huntington
- Ince
- Kelsall
- Kingsley
- Kingsmead
- Lach Dennis and Lostock Green
- Lea-by-Backford
- Ledsham
- Little Budworth
- Little Leigh
- Little Stanney
- Littleton
- Lostock Gralam
- Malpas
- Manley
- Marston
- Mickle Trafford and District
- Mollington
- Moston
- Mouldsworth
- Moulton
- Neston
- Nether Peover
- No Man's Heath and District
- Norley
- Northwich
- Poulton and Pulford
- Puddington
- Rowton
- Rudheath
- Rushton
- Saughall and Shotwick Park
- Shocklach Oviatt and District
- Sproston
- Stanthorne and Wimboldsley
- Stoak
- Stretton
- Sutton Weaver
- Tarporley
- Tarvin
- Tattenhall and District
- Thornton-le-Moors
- Threapwood
- Tilston
- Tiverton and Tilstone Fearnall
- Tushingham-cum-Grindley, Macefen and Bradley
- Upton-by-Chester
- Utkinton and Cotebrook
- Waverton
- Weaverham
- Wervin
- Whitegate and Marton
- Whitley
- Wigland
- Willington
- Wincham
- Winsford

== See also ==
- List of civil parishes in England
