= List of places in Cheshire =

Some of the larger settlements of Cheshire.

This is a list of places within the ceremonial county boundaries of Cheshire, in North West England.

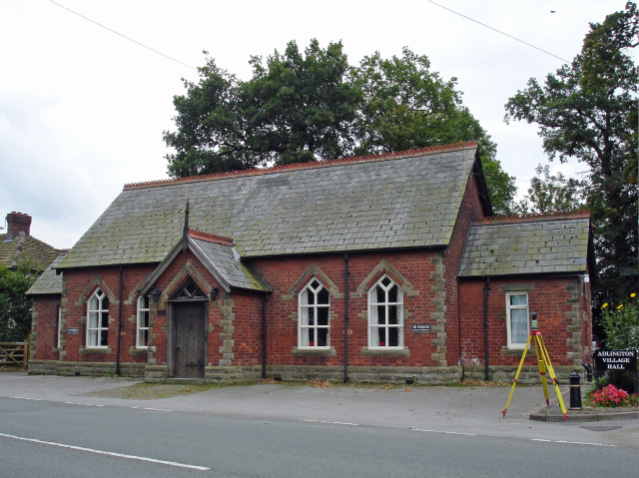
Adlington Village Hall

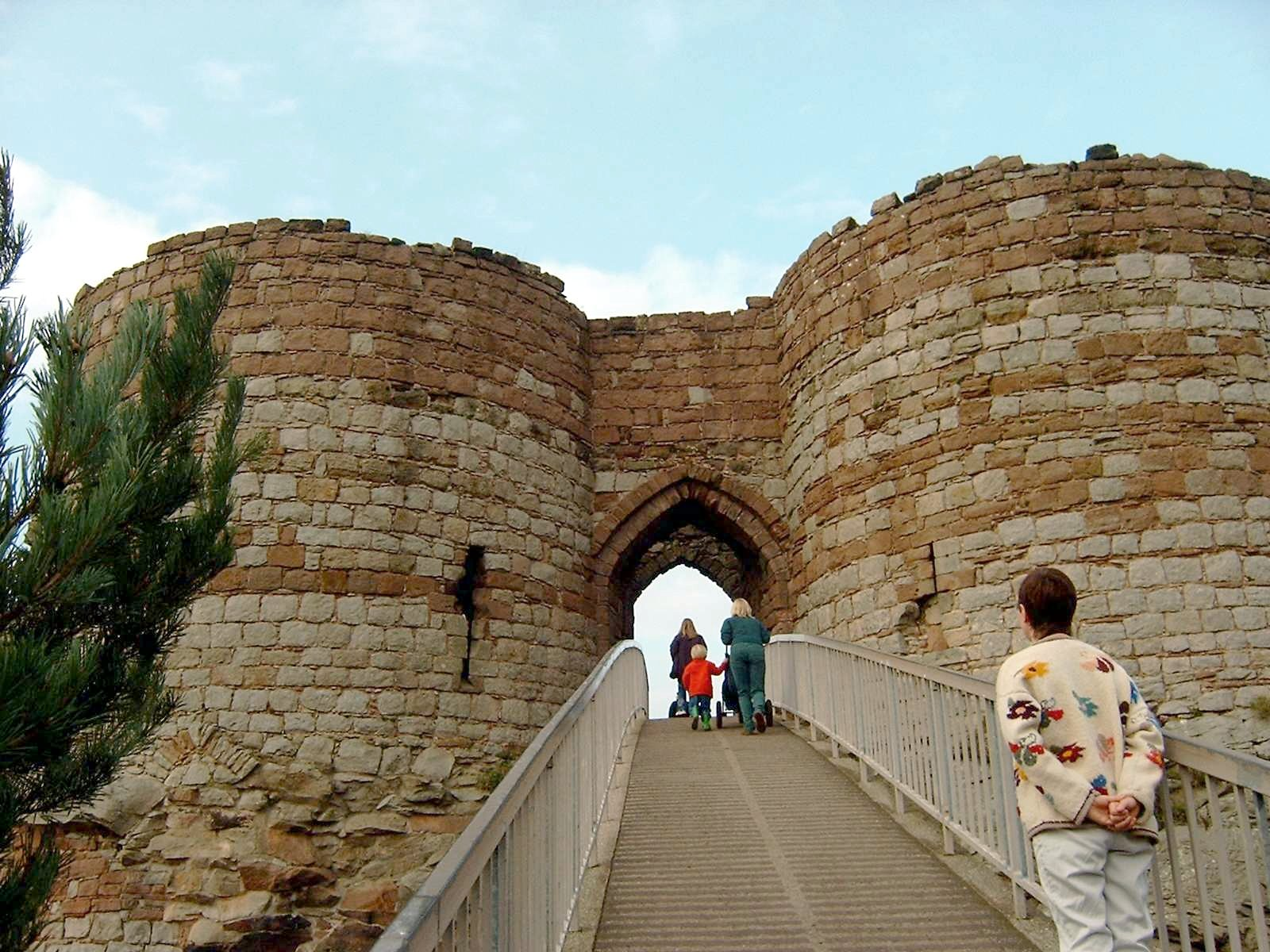
Beeston Castle Gate

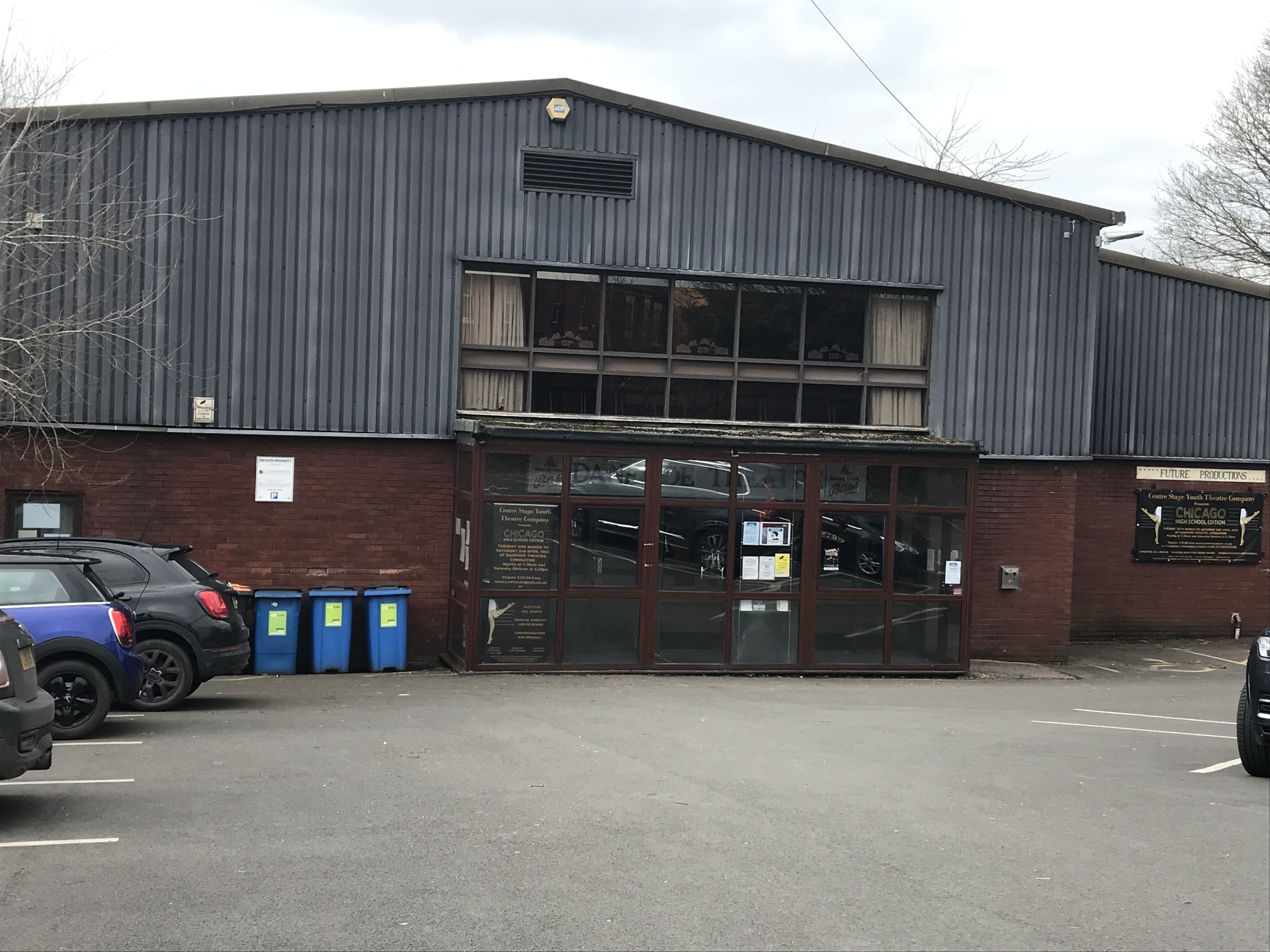
Daneside Theatre

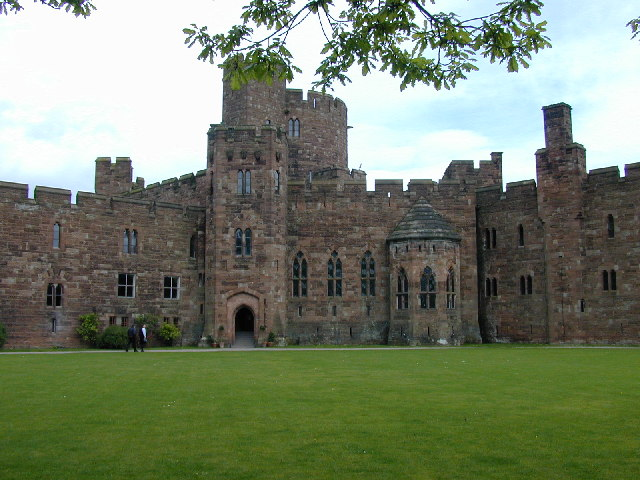
Peckforton Castle

== A ==
- Acton
- Acton Bridge (or Acton-in-Delamere)
- Adlington
- Agden (Chester)
- Agden (Macclesfield)
- Alderley Edge
- Aldersey
- Aldford
- Alsager
- Allostock
- Alpraham
- Alvanley
- Altrincham
- Anderton with Marbury
- Antrobus
- Appleton (or Appleton Thorn)
- Arclid
- Ashley
- Ashton
- Ashton Hayes
- Astbury (or Newbold Astbury)
- Aston by Budworth
- Aston by Sutton
- Aston juxta Mondrum
- Aston
- Audlem

== B ==
- Backford
- Baddiley
- Barnton
- Barthomley
- Batherton
- Beeston
- Bexton
- Bickerton
- Blacon
- Bollington
- Bosley
- Bradwall
- Brereton
- Brown Knowl
- Broxton
- Bruera
- Bucklow Hill
- Buerton (east)
- Buerton (west)
- Bunbury
- Burton (near Neston)
- Burton (near Tarporley)
- Burwardsley
- Byley

== C ==
- Capenhurst
- Chelford
- Chester
- Cholmondeley
- Cholmondeston
- Chorley (Alderley)
- Christleton
- Churton
- Clutton
- Comberbach
- Congleton
- Coole Pilate
- Cranage
- Crewe
- Crewe Green
- Crowton
- Cuddington

== D ==
- Daresbury
- Darnhall
- Davenham
- Delamere
- Dawpool
- Disley
- Dodleston
- Dunham-on-the-Hill
- Dutton

== E ==
- Eaton (near Macclesfield)
- Eccleston
- Elworth
- Ellesmere Port
- Elton
- Englesea Brook
- Ettiley Heath

== F ==
- Farndon
- Farnworth
- Four Lane Ends
- Frodsham

== G ==
- Gawsworth
- Goostrey
- Grappenhall
- Great Budworth
- Great Sutton
- Great Warford
- Guilden Sutton

== H ==
- Hale
- Handforth
- Handley
- Hargrave
- Hartford
- Haslington
- Hatherton
- Hatton
- Helsby
- Henbury
- High Legh
- Higher Whitley
- Holmes Chapel
- Hoole
- Hunsterson
- Huntington
- Huxley

== I ==
- Ince

== K ==
- Kelsall
- Kettleshulme
- Kerridge
- Kingsley
- Knutsford

== L ==
- Lacey Green
- Langley
- Lach Dennis
- Latchford
- Ledsham
- Leftwich
- Little Bollington
- Little Budworth
- Little Leigh
- Little Neston
- Little Sutton
- Little Warford
- Littleton
- Lostock Gralam
- Lower Peover
- Lower Whitley
- Lower Withington
- Lymm

== M ==
- Macclesfield
- Malpas
- Manley
- Marston
- Marthall
- Marton
- Medhurst Green
- Mere
- Mickle Trafford
- Middlewich
- Millington
- Mobberley
- Mollington
- Moore
- Mottram St. Andrew
- Mouldsworth
- Moulton

== N ==
- Nantwich
- Ness
- Neston
- Nether Alderley
- Newbold Astbury (or Astbury)
- Newton
- Norley
- North Rode
- Northwich

== O ==
- Oakhanger
- Oakmere
- Occlestone
- Ollerton
- Over
- Over Alderley

== P ==
- Parkgate
- Peckforton
- Peover Inferior (Lower Peover)
- Peover Superior (Over Peover)
- Pickmere
- Plemstall
- Plumley
- Pott Shrigley
- Poynton
- Prestbury
- Preston Brook
- Puddington

== R ==
- Rainow
- Rhuddall Heath
- Rode Heath
- Rostherne
- Rowton
- Rudheath
- Runcorn
- Rushton

== S ==
- Saighton
- Sandbach
- Sandiway
- Saughall
- Scholar Green
- Shavington
- Shocklach
- Shotwick
- Siddington
- Snelson
- Sound, Cheshire
- Sproston
- Stanthorne
- Stapeley
- Stoak
- Stockton Heath
- Stretton
- Styal
- Sutton Weaver
- Sutton Lane Ends
- Swettenham

== T ==
- Tabley Inferior
- Tabley Superior
- Tarporley
- Tarvin
- Tatton
- Tattenhall
- Thornton-le-Moors
- Threapwood
- Thurlwood
- Tilston
- Timbersbrook
- Tiverton
- Toft
- Tranmere
- Tushingham

== U ==
- Utkinton
- Upton (or Upton-by-Chester)

== V ==
- Vicars Cross

== W ==
- Warrington
- Warmingham
- Waverton
- Weaverham
- Wervin
- Westminster
- Weston (south)
- Weston (north)
- Wettenhall
- Wharton
- Wheelock
- Whitegate
- Widnes
- Wildboarclough
- Willaston (east)
- Willaston (west)
- Wilmslow
- Wimboldsley
- Wincham
- Winsford
- Winterley
- Wirral Peninsula
- Woolstanwood
- Wrenbury
- Wistaston
- Wybunbury

== See also ==
- List of Cheshire settlements by population
- List of civil parishes in Cheshire
- Places of interest in Cheshire
- List of places in England
