= List of settlements in Cheshire by population =

The 26 largest settlements in Cheshire. District centres in yellow.

This is a list of settlements in Cheshire by population based on the results of the 2021 census. The following United Kingdom census will take place in 2031. In 2011, there were 32 built-up area subdivisions with 5,000 or more inhabitants in Cheshire, shown in the table below.

== Population ranking ==
#	Settlement	Council area	Population		
#	Settlement	Council area	2001	2011	2021
1	Warrington	Warrington	158,146	166,423	174,970
2	Chester	Cheshire West and Chester	81,810	86,450	92,760
3	Crewe	Cheshire East	65,669	70,101	76,437
4	Ellesmere Port	Cheshire West and Chester	62,081	60,572	65,430
5	Runcorn	Halton	59,944	61,260	61,645
6	Widnes	Halton	53,181	58,086	59,935
7	Macclesfield	Cheshire East	51,277	53,351	54,345
8	Winsford	Cheshire West and Chester	28,922	29,756	32,530
9	Congleton	Cheshire East	25,768	26,588	30,005
10	Wilmslow	Cheshire East	23,129	24,424	25,725
11	Nantwich	Cheshire East	13,617	17,172	18,740
12	Northwich	Cheshire West and Chester	14,676	15,947	18,640
13	Alsager	Cheshire East	14,178	13,347	15,505
14	Neston	Cheshire West and Chester	14,712	14,798	14,960
15	Middlewich	Cheshire East	13,101	13,595	14,425
16	Davenham	Cheshire West and Chester	11,784	13,051	13,835
17	Knutsford	Cheshire East	12,656	13,191	13,255
18	Poynton	Cheshire East	13,391	13,161	13,010
19	Lymm	Warrington	9,515	11,265	11,545
20	Sandbach	Cheshire East	9,546	9,798	11,290
21	Frodsham	Cheshire West and Chester	8,908	9,032	9,100
22	Elworth	Cheshire East	5,857	6,011	7,645
23	Bollington	Cheshire East	6,622	7,096	7,235
24	Culcheth	Warrington	6,729	6,708	6,720
25	Hartford	Cheshire West and Chester	5,515	5,558	6,695
26	Holmes Chapel	Cheshire East	5,669	5,605	6,670
27	Weaverham	Cheshire West and Chester	6,293	6,087	6,265
28	Barnton	Cheshire West and Chester	6,109	6,185	6,255
29	Cuddington	Cheshire West and Chester	4,920	5,042	5,860
30	Helsby	Cheshire West and Chester	4,701	4,972	5,275
31	Haslington	Cheshire East	5,075	4,855	5,040

== See also ==
- Civil parishes in Cheshire
- List of places in Cheshire
- List of towns and cities in England by population
