= Places of interest in Cheshire =

This is a list of places of interest in Cheshire, England. See List of places in Cheshire for a list of settlements in the county.

== Places of interest ==
Key
	Abbey/Priory/Cathedral
Accessible open space	Accessible open space
	Amusement/Theme Park
	Castle
Country Park	Country Park
	English Heritage
	Forestry Commission
Heritage railway	Heritage railway
Historic house	Historic House
Places of Worship	Places of Worship
Museum (free) Museum	Museum (free/not free)
National Trust	National Trust
	Theatre
	Zoo

== Country parks, gardens and accessible open spaces ==
- Bickerton Hill
- Daresbury Firs
- Delamere Forest
- The Edge, Alderley Edge
- Hare Hill
- Helsby Hill, Helsby
- Lamaload Reservoir
- Macclesfield Forest
- Mersey Forest
- Murdishaw Valley, Runcorn
- Ness Botanic Gardens
- Northwich Community Woodlands
- Pick Mere, Pickmere
- Peckforton Hills
- Pickerings Pasture, Widnes
- Runcorn Hill
- Shakerley Mere
- Shining Tor
- Shutlingsloe
- Swettenham Meadows Nature Reserve
- Tatton Park
- Tegg's Nose Country Park
- Wigg Island, Runcorn
- Windgather Rocks
- Winsford Flashes

== Castles and houses ==
- Adlington Hall
- Arley Hall
- Beeston Castle
- Bolesworth Castle
- Capesthorne Hall
- Cholmondeley Castle
- Doddington Park
- Dorfold Hall
- Eaton Hall
- Elton Hall, Aldford
- Gawsworth Hall
- Halton Castle
- Holt Castle
- Little Moreton Hall
- Lyme Park
- Moss Hall, Audlem
- Norton Priory
- Peckforton Castle
- Peover Hall
- Tabley House
- Vale Royal Abbey

== Footpaths ==
- Biddulph Valley Way
- Gritstone Trail
- Sandstone Trail
- South Cheshire Way
- Wirral Way (partly in Cheshire)

== Museums ==
- National Waterways Museum, Ellesmere Port
- Catalyst Science Discovery Centre, Widnes
- Grosvenor Museum, Chester
- Hack Green Secret Nuclear Bunker
- Lion Salt Works, Marston
- Weaver Hall Museum and Workhouse, Northwich

== Other places of interest ==
- The Bridestones
- Chester Cathedral
- Chester city walls
- Chester Grosvenor and Spa
- Chester Zoo
- Jodrell Bank Observatory
- Parkgate
- Sandbach Crosses

== Watermills ==
- Bunbury Mill
- Nether Alderley Mill
- Quarry Bank Mill
- Stretton Watermill

== Waterways ==
- Anderton Boat Lift
- Ashton Canal
- Bridgewater Canal
- Macclesfield Canal
- River Bollin
- River Dane
- River Dee
- River Gowy
- River Goyt
- River Mersey
- Peak Forest Canal
- Rochdale Canal
- Shropshire Union Canal
- Trent and Mersey Canal
- Wardle Canal
- River Weaver

== See also ==
- List of places in Cheshire
