= Listed buildings in Penketh =

Penketh is a civil parish in the Borough of Warrington in Cheshire, England. It contains six buildings that are recorded in the National Heritage List for England as designated listed buildings, all of which are at Grade II. This grade is the lowest of the three gradings given to listed buildings and is applied to "buildings of national importance and special interest". The parish is mainly residential, with some farming; the River Mersey runs through the parish, the Manchester Ship Canal runs along the southern boundary, and the A562 road ends within it.

Name and location	Photograph	Date	Notes
Penketh Hall; 53.3797°N 2.6509°W	—	1757	A brick house with slate roofs, it was later extended. The front is rendered, and at the back are stone quoins. The main block is in two storeys, and has five bays. The windows are sashes.
Brookside Farmhouse; 53.3834°N 2.6666°W	—	c. 1820	The house is in brick with gabled stone-slate roofs. The windows on the front are sashes, and one fixed window. On the back, other than one sash window, the others are casements. Above the door is a fanlight.
Barn, Penketh Hall; 53.3803°N 2.6512°W	—	c. 1830 (probable)	An L-shaped barn in brick with gabled slate roofs. Features include large openings with timber lintels, hinge blocks in sandstone, and diamond-shaped vents.
Milestone; 53.38309°N 2.66118°W	—	Between 1882 and 1896	A triangular whitewashed stone milepost. It shows the distances to buildings rather than places, namely Widnes Town Hall and Warrington Marketgate.
Moore Lane Bridge; 53.3632°N 2.6352°W		c. 1894	A steel swing bridge crossing the Manchester Ship Canal. It is a segmental arched bridge with a lattice parapet. It is driven by hydraulic power from buildings on the north side of the canal.
War Memorial; 53.38845°N 2.64959°W	—	Early 1920s	Built to remember those lost in the First World War, with a plaque added for the Second World War. It consists of a concrete octagonal column carrying a Celtic cross, standing on a trapezoidal base and octagonal plinth, in a semicircular enclosure.
