= Bickerton Hill =

Hill in Cheshire, England

Coordinates: 53.087°N 2.714°W

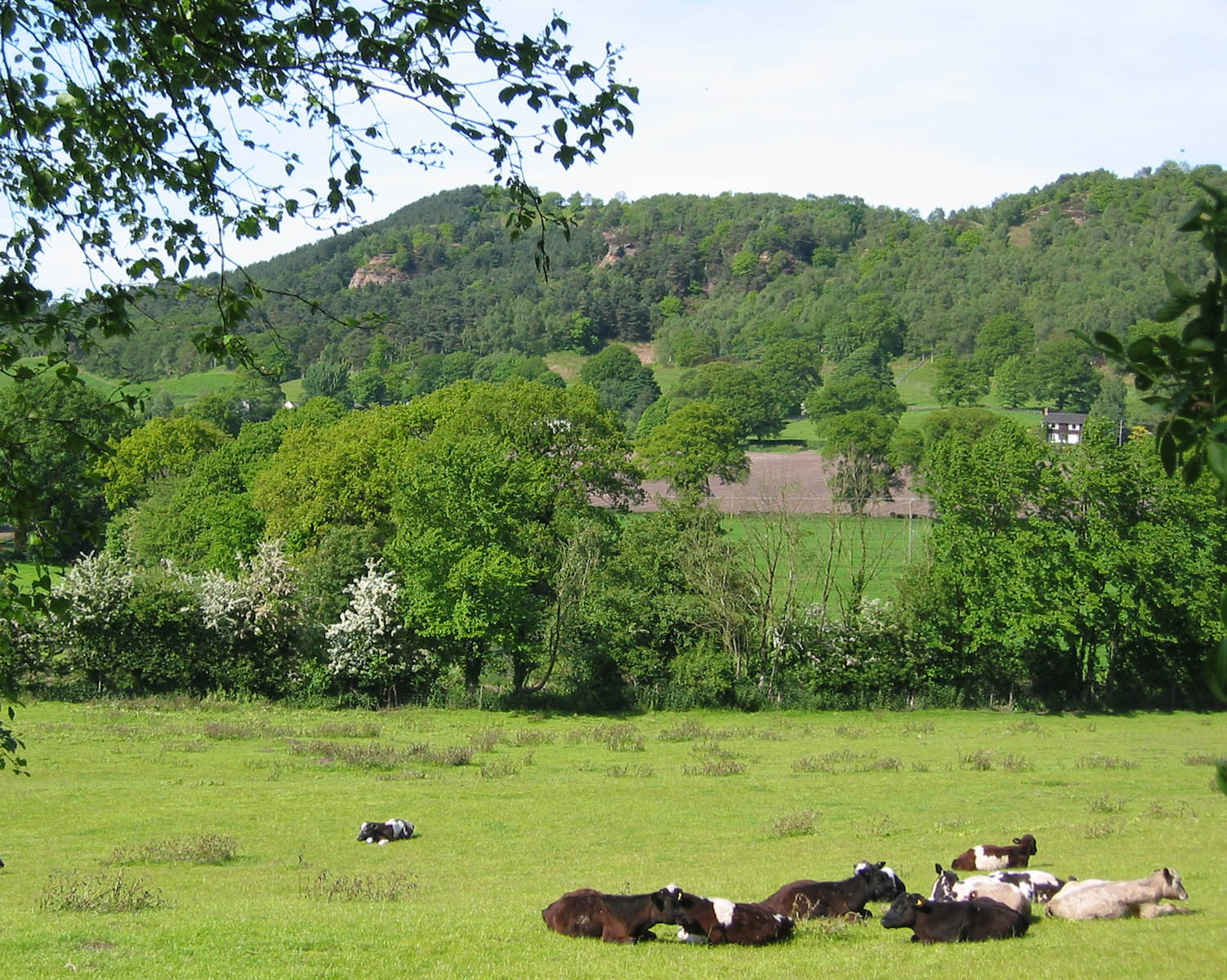
- Northern Bickerton Hill, showing Raw Head and Musket's Hole crags

Highest point
- Elevation: 227 m (745 ft)
- Prominence: 148.5 m (487 ft)

Geography
- Location: Cheshire, England
- Parent range: Mid Cheshire Ridge
- OS grid: SJ508548
- Topo map: OS Explorer 257, Landranger 117

Bickerton Hill refers to two low red sandstone hills that form the southern end of the Mid Cheshire Ridge in Cheshire, north-west England. The high point, Raw Head, lies on the northerly hill and has an elevation of 227 metres. Parts of the southerly hill are also known as Larkton Hill.

There is evidence of settlement on the hills dating as early as the Neolithic or Bronze Age. The earthworks of an Iron Age hill fort, Maiden Castle, are located on the summit of the southerly hill; they are a Scheduled Monument. The hills have been quarried and mined for copper since the 17th century, and a grade-II-listed engine house chimney remains as a remnant of the mining industry. Several caves occur in the sandstone, some of which have a history of habitation. The Sandstone Trail, a long-distance footpath, runs along the ridge, and the area is popular with walkers.

A large area of the southerly hill is protected as a Site of Special Scientific Interest (SSSI) for its biological importance; much of this hill is owned by the National Trust. Its summit plateau has an extensive area of lowland heath, a rare habitat in Cheshire, and one that is particularly important for reptiles. A substantial population of lobed maidenhair spleenwort, a fern that is rare in Britain, is found here. Nationally scarce species observed in the area include the bleached pug and alder kitten moths, and the Malthus frontalis species of soldier beetle. The western escarpment of the northerly hill has also been designated an SSSI for its exposed Triassic sandstones.

== History ==
=== Neolithic and Bronze Age ===
Cropmarks near Rawhead Farm suggest a possible neolithic or Bronze Age settlement on the northern hill, which is of the "banjo enclosure" type, consisting of a circular enclosure with a narrow enclosed entrance. Two flint artefacts have been found on the southern hill: a leaf-shaped flint of unknown date and a Bronze Age arrowhead. A Bronze Age burial mound of the bowl barrow type is located on top of an unnamed knoll immediately to the east of the southerly Bickerton Hill (SJ51055269).

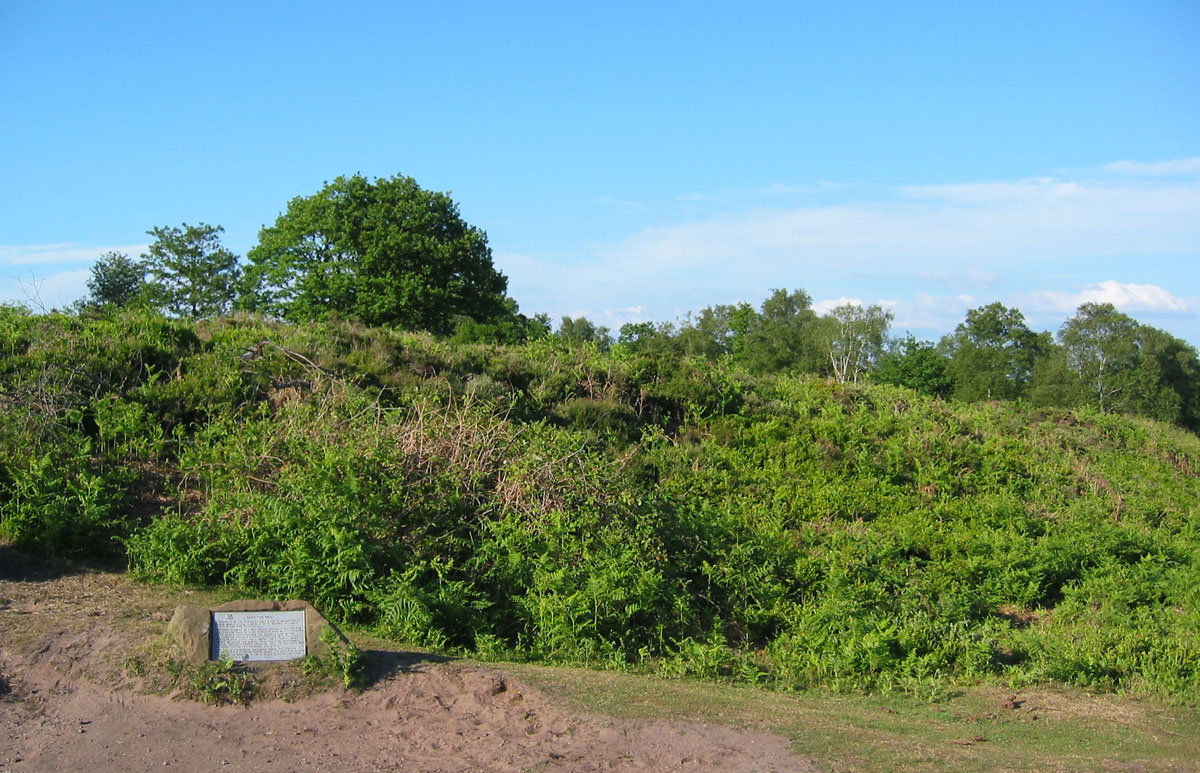
Rampart of Maiden Castle

=== Maiden Castle ===
The remains of an Iron Age promontory hill fort, Maiden Castle, are located on the southernmost summit of the southerly hill at an elevation of 212 metres. Maiden Castle dates from around 600 BC and is the most southerly of the seven hill forts in Cheshire. The double line of earth ramparts are still visible, forming a semicircle that encloses an area of 1.3 acres (5,300 m^{2}) adjacent to the cliff edge. The enclosure has a single entrance at the east side with inturned defensive banks. Archaeological investigations have shown that both ramparts are strengthened by dry stone walling; the inner rampart also has timber strapping. The fort was destroyed by fire in around 400 BC, although the area was probably used as a settlement until the Roman invasion of Britain in the 1st century AD.

The site is well preserved despite quarrying of the area during the 17th to early 20th centuries, as well as military training exercises during the 20th century. The remaining earthworks have been designated a Scheduled Monument, and the site is owned by the National Trust. Since 2009, the trust has been removing trees, scrub and bracken from the site, as the roots damage the earthworks. Animal burrows are another threat, and footpath erosion from visitors is also a problem, as the Sandstone Trail cuts across the earthworks. There is another Maiden Castle which is an Iron Age hill fort 2.5 kilometres (1.6 mi) south west of Dorchester, in the English county of Dorset.

=== Anglo-Saxon and Norman ===
The name "Bickerton" is Anglo-Saxon in origin, and relates to bees. A township was recorded in the Domesday Book survey, which was found "waste", or devastated, at the time of the survey, in common with many nearby townships. This is usually considered to be a consequence of William I's suppression in 1069–70 of uprisings in north-west Mercia. The township included half a league (about 3/4 mile) of woodland, perhaps located on the hills.

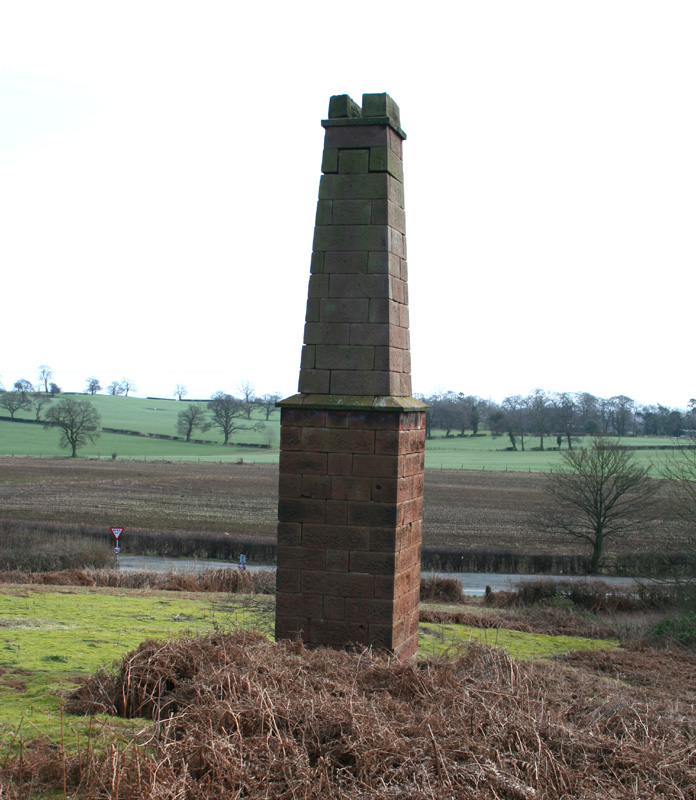
Copper mine chimney

=== 17th–19th century ===
Copper mining at Bickerton was first recorded in 1696. The mine was owned by the Egerton family of Oulton, with eight miners being employed between 1696 and 1698. There were six shafts, one of which was deepened to 156 feet (48 m) in 1807. The mines were worked intermittently until 1906. A rare remnant of this local industry is a disused mine engine house chimney in red sandstone, which stands by the A534 at the foot of the northerly hill near Gallantry Bank. The flue of a pumping engine that was used to drain the mine, it dates from the early 19th century and is a grade-II-listed building. The remains of adjacent mining buildings were still standing in around 1920. The Copper Mine public house at nearby Broxton displays mining equipment and pictures.

Quarrying also took place at various sites on the hills, including Maiden Castle from the 17th century. Sandstone was extracted for building, and sand for use as a scouring agent. An iron rock-splitting wedge dating from the 17th century was found during excavations of Maiden Castle.

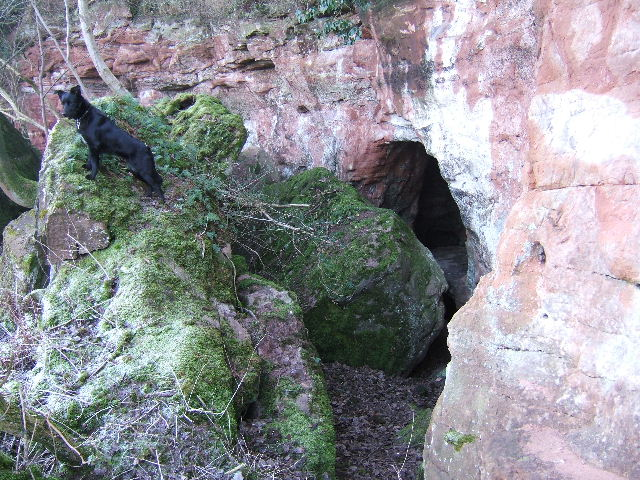
Mad Allen's Hole

Mad Allen's Hole, a cave on the southerly Bickerton Hill, is believed by some to be the location of "Allenscomb's Cave" in which John Harris, "the English Hermit", lived for 46 years in the 18th century. According to a pamphlet of 1809, Harris was a man of property from Handley, who embraced a hermit's life when his parents refused him permission to marry the woman of his choice. He first inhabited a cave in nearby Carden Park, moving to Allenscomb's Cave in the 1760s. Recent research has, however, cast doubt on the identification of Mad Allen's Hole with Allenscomb's Cave. Unlike the cave in Carden Park, no material dating to the 18th century has been discovered at Bickerton, and the name "Mad Allen's Hole" originated in the late 19th century, when the cave was occupied by an eccentric known as Mad Allen. In the early 19th century, the Bloody Bones caves on the northerly hill were occupied by brigands, who terrorised the surrounding countryside, stealing cheese from local farms and plundering graves, as well as selling sand for cleaning. Seven were captured and executed in around 1834.

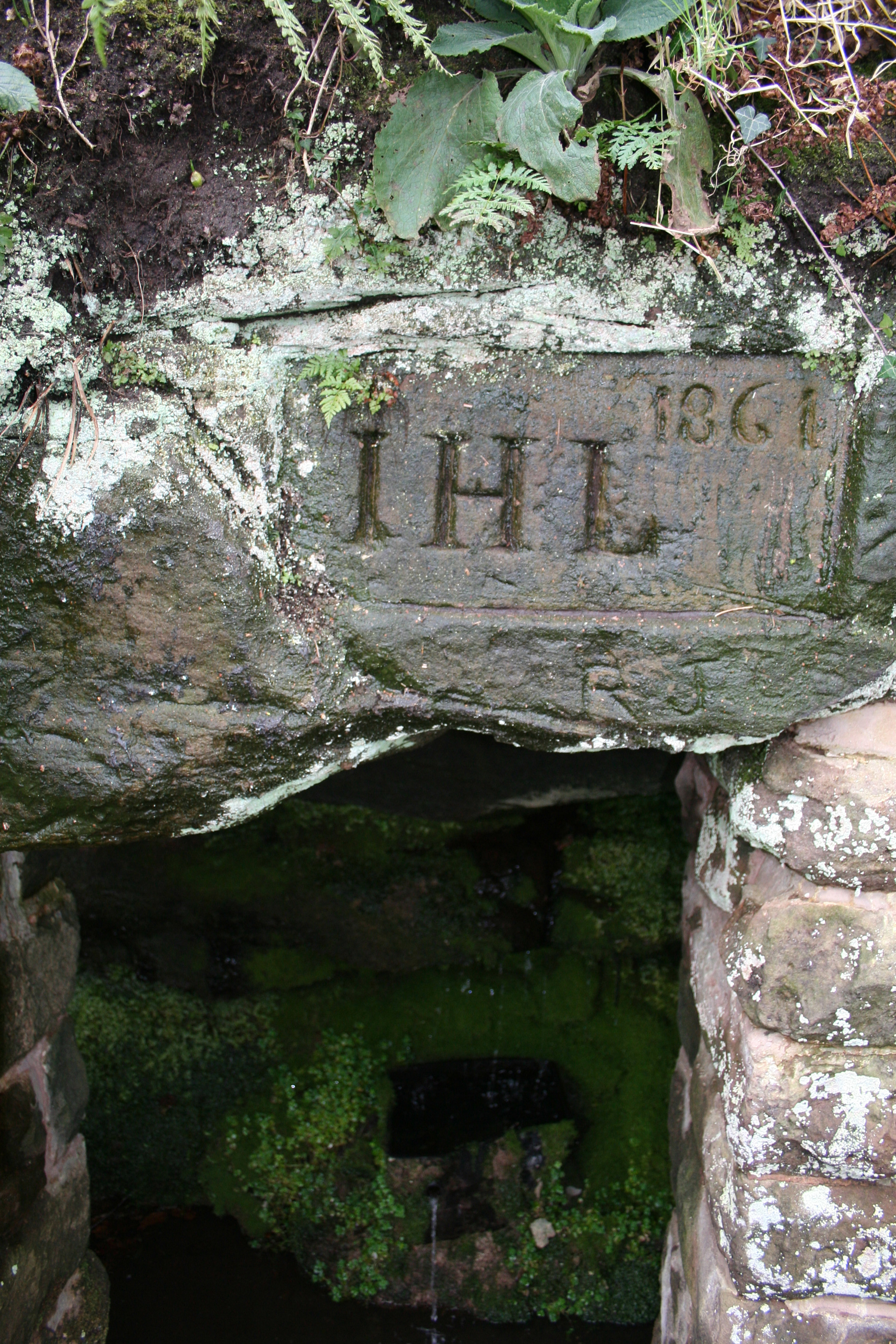
Droppingstone Well

The Droppingstone Well, immediately north of the Raw Head summit, bears a plaque dated 1861. A photograph of 1910 shows the well in use by locals.

=== 20th–21st century ===
The area around Maiden Castle was used for military training exercises during the 20th century, which included digging numerous two-man slit trenches. The heathland of the southerly hill went unmanaged from the 1940s until 1983, when 66 hectares (160 acres) of land were acquired by the National Trust; the trust's holding was extended by 51 hectares (130 acres) in 1991. Much of the southerly hill and the western escarpment of the northerly hill were notified as two separate Sites of Special Scientific Interest in 1979.

The Sandstone Trail long-distance footpath opened in 1974; it then started in Duckington, immediately south of the southerly hill. The Sandstone Trail Race was launched three years later. A 2008 proposal to construct a 60-metre wind-monitoring mast adjacent to Bickerton Hill met with local protest, and was rejected by Crewe and Nantwich Borough Council.

== Geography, geology and climate ==
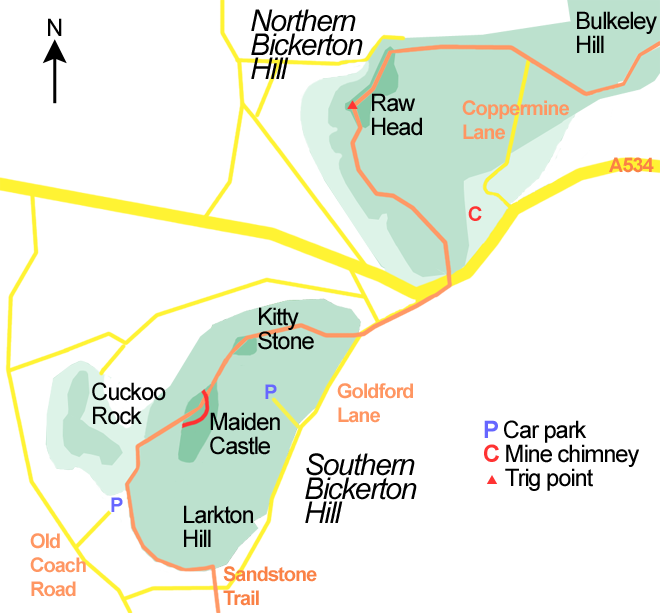
Sketch map of the two Bickerton Hills

The two Bickerton Hills lie south-west of the Peckforton Hills. They form the southern end and high point of the Mid Cheshire Ridge, which runs broadly north–south through Cheshire from Beacon Hill near Frodsham. The southern part of the ridge, including both Bickerton Hills, has been designated an Area of Special County Value. The ridge line continues north–south over the northerly Bickerton Hill, turning approximately 30° to the west over the southerly hill. The two hills are separated by a valley through which the A534 runs. The nearest settlements are (anti-clockwise from the south) Duckington, Brown Knowl, Fuller's Moor, Harthill, Bulkeley, Gallantry Bank and Bickerton.

The summit of the northerly hill, Raw Head (SJ508548), has an elevation of 227 metres and is the highest point on the Mid Cheshire Ridge. Raw Head was believed to be a Marilyn but was demoted in 2009 following a re-survey; the re-estimate of Raw Head's prominence is 148.5 metres. The high point bears a trig point. The summit plateau of the southerly hill has two high points, at Maiden Castle (212 metres, SJ501534) and the Kitty Stone (193 metres, SJ497527). The southern (Maiden Castle) high point is sometimes referred to as Larkton Hill; this name is also sometimes used to refer to the southeast of the hill, which partly falls within the Larkton civil parish.

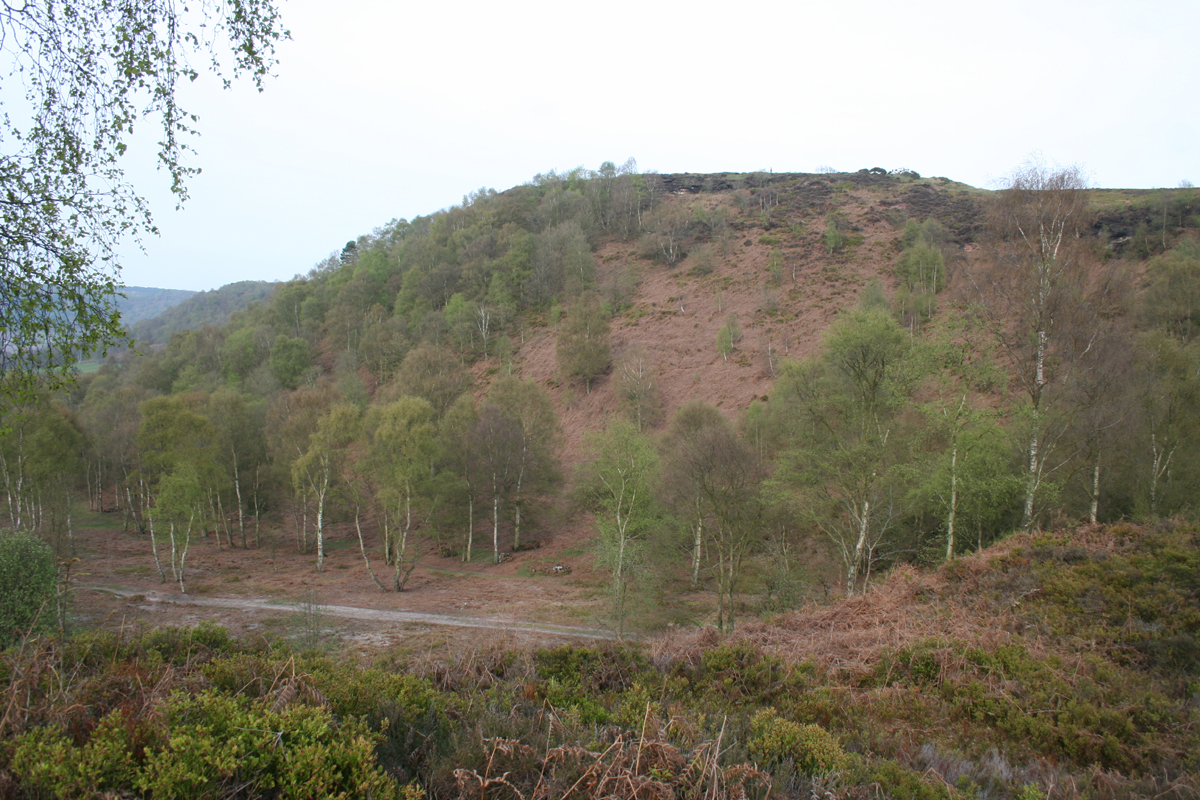
Southern Bickerton Hill from Cuckoo Rock. The southmost high point is in the foreground, with the northmost high point behind (left)

The ridge is formed from a sandstone outcrop of the Sherwood Sandstone Group, dating from the Early Triassic period around 250 million years ago. The sandstones are exposed forming extensive crags on the west flank of the northerly hill, as well as in smaller areas of the southerly hill. There are several natural caves. The two-storey cave known as Mad Allen's Hole (on the southerly hill at SJ503536) has an entrance partially blocked by boulders and is accessible via a circular hole at the rear. The Queen's Parlour, a large triple-chambered cave directly under the Raw Head trig point, might be partially quarried.

The steeply sloping west flank of the northerly hill is clothed with conifer plantation and mixed woodland, which is managed for pheasant shooting. The summit plateau and gently sloping east flank have a mixture of pasture, arable land and plantation. The soils of the southerly hill are acidic and predominantly nutrient poor, with brown sands on the ridge, and leached podzolic soils as well as brown earths at lower elevations. It supports a mixture of heath and largely deciduous woodland, with some pasture fields.

Like much of the Mid Cheshire Ridge, the Bickerton Hills are rather cooler than the surrounding Cheshire Plain, with an accumulated temperature of 1375–1649 day °C compared with 1650–1924 day °C. The soil is slightly moist, with a similar moisture level to that of the surrounding area.

== Sites of Special Scientific Interest ==
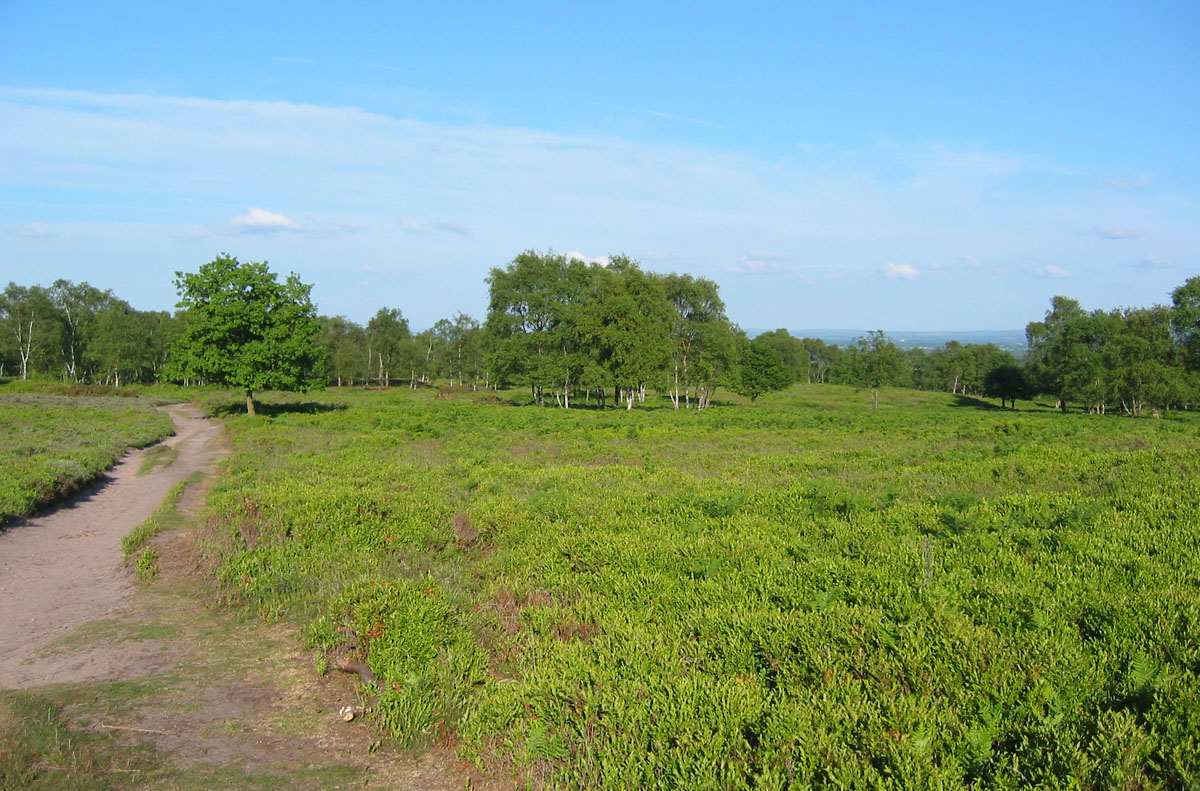
Heathland on the southern hill's summit plateau, here dominated by bilberry

=== Bickerton Hill ===
An area of 91.0 hectares (225 acres) of the birch woods and heathland of the southerly hill has been designated a Site of Special Scientific Interest (SSSI). With the exception of several areas of farmland and former quarries, the SSSI covers the northmost (Kitty Stone) high point and the Maiden Castle area of the southern high point, together with the intervening col. It also extends over Cuckoo Rock, a lower area to the west of the southern high point, which lies to the south of the hamlet of Brown Knowl. It excludes the southwest of the hill, including part of Hether Wood as well as an area of farmland. A total of 117 hectares (290 acres) of the southerly hill, covering 90% of the SSSI, are owned and managed by the National Trust.

The lowland heath habitat (heathland below 300 metres elevation) of Bickerton Hill is considered particularly valuable. Lowland heath is an internationally scarce habitat that is rare within Cheshire; a survey in 1995 found only 60 Ha in the administrative county. Bickerton Hill is the largest of the four lowland heath SSSIs in the county. A semi-natural habitat, heathland requires active management, such as grazing, to avoid succession to scrub and woodland.

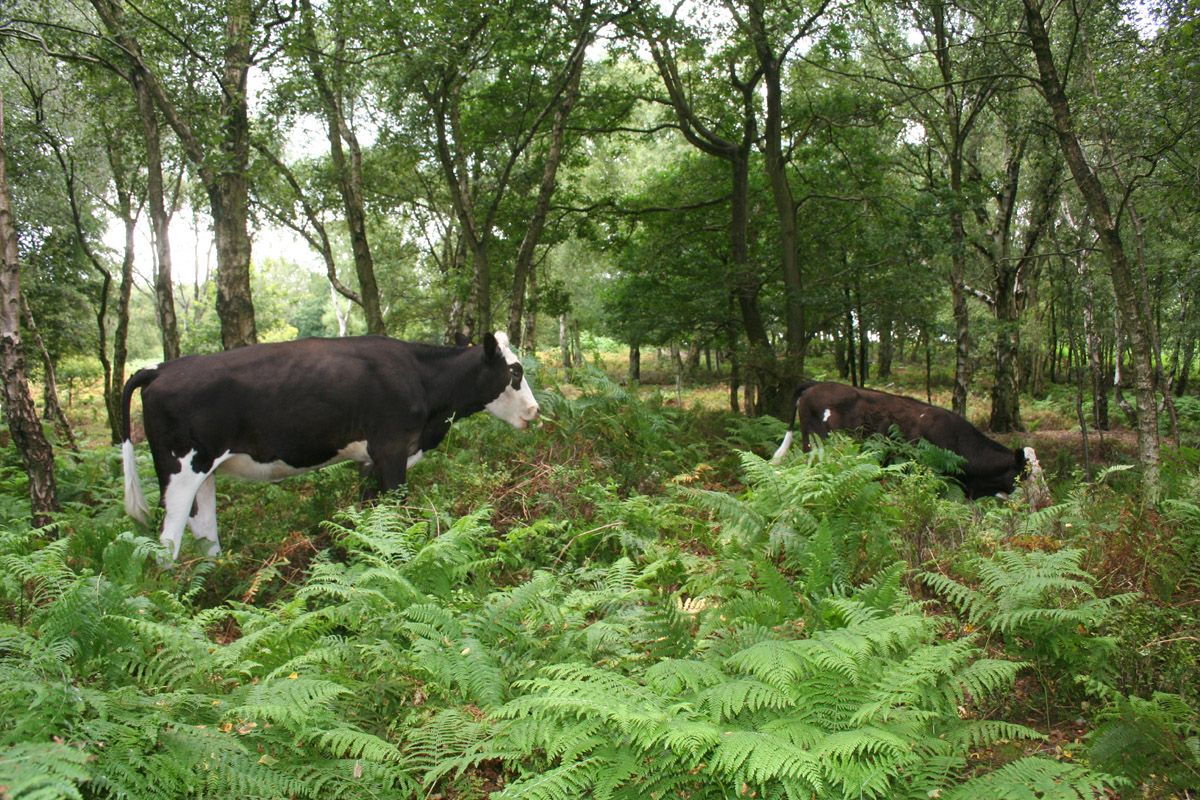
Birch woods on the southern hill; grazing promotes heathland regeneration

==== Flora ====
Within the heathland areas, the predominant community types are Calluna vulgaris (common heather)–Deschampsia flexuosa (wavy hair grass) (H9) and heather–Ulex gallii (western gorse) (H8). Bilberry (Vaccinium myrtillus) is also widespread, with some patches of bracken (Pteridium aquilinum), and less frequently bell heather (Erica cinerea), cross leaved heath (Erica tetralix) and broom (Cytisus scoparius).

The woodland is dominated by silver birch, with aspen, holly, rowan, sessile oak and wild cherry also present. The undergrowth includes heather and bilberry, with patches of broad buckler-fern (Dryopteris dilatata). Over two hundred plants of the nationally rare fern, Lobed Maidenhair Spleenwort (Asplenium trichomanes subsp pachyrachis), were discovered in 1997, growing on calcareous sandstone at two different locations; this is possibly the largest population of the subspecies in Britain. A few plants have since been recorded at Raw Head.

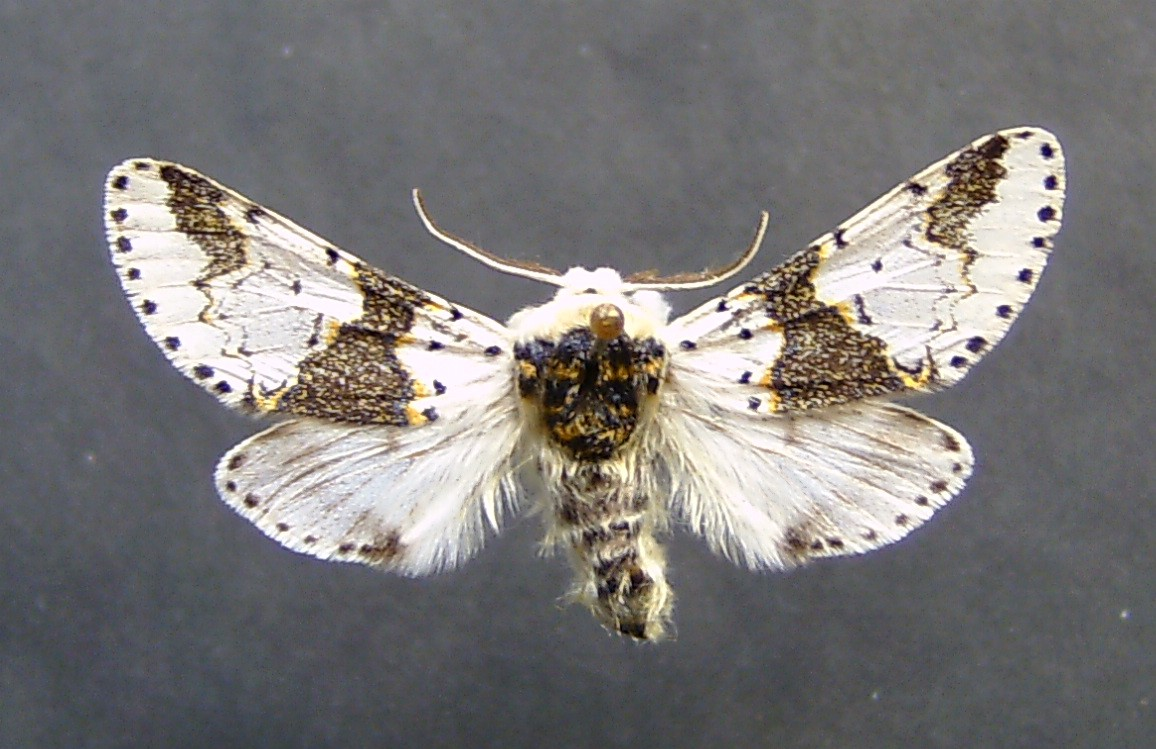
Alder kitten moth

==== Fauna ====
The area is rich in wildlife. Insects found here that are scarce in the UK include the bleached pug and alder kitten moths, as well as the soldier beetle species Malthius frontalis. Locally scarce insects include the green hairstreak butterfly and the common glow-worm. The site provides a habitat for butterflies, with common species including the comma, gatekeeper, red admiral, speckled wood and small tortoiseshell.

There is a breeding population of pied flycatcher. Other birds commonly observed here include the jay, long-tailed tit, magpie, nuthatch, raven, treecreeper, and the great spotted and green woodpeckers. The buzzard, kestrel and sparrowhawk are common raptors, while merlin and peregrine falcon have been observed more rarely.

The reptile populations at Bickerton Hill are of particular significance. It is one of five sites in the county where the adder has been recorded since 1995. Other reptiles here include slow worm and common lizard.

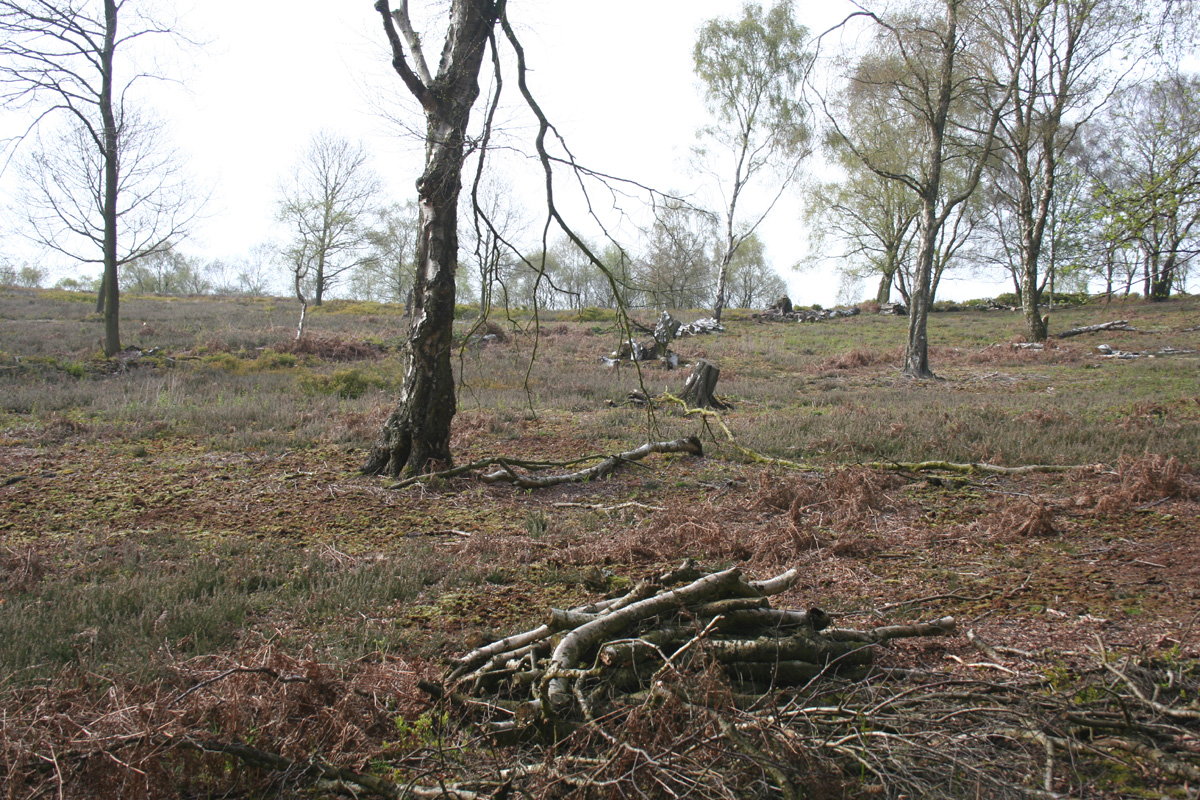
Tree felling promotes heathland regeneration but reduces the area's aesthetic value

==== Current status and management ====
The site was assessed by English Nature as in an unfavourable but recovering condition in 2005. Management of the area by the National Trust has aimed, since 1992, to promote heathland regeneration by preventing encroachment by birches, scrub and bracken. Strategies used include bracken rolling, clearing birch scrub and removing some older trees from heathland areas. Grazing with cattle is employed in summer. Tree clearance, has, however, resulted in conflict between the trust and a local residents group, Friends of Bickerton Hill, which organised a protest on the hill in October 2008 against tree felling, especially in the picturesque Cuckoo Rock Valley.

Woodland areas are managed to encourage the development of trees of a wide range of ages by halo thinning around older trees, thinning in denser woodland and planting new trees. Dead wood forms an important habitat and is retained.

Other threats to the site include the high volume of walkers, which has led to footpath erosion, and the inappropriate disposal of dog faeces. Bickerton Hill is included in the Cheshire Biodiversity Action Plan.

=== Raw Head ===
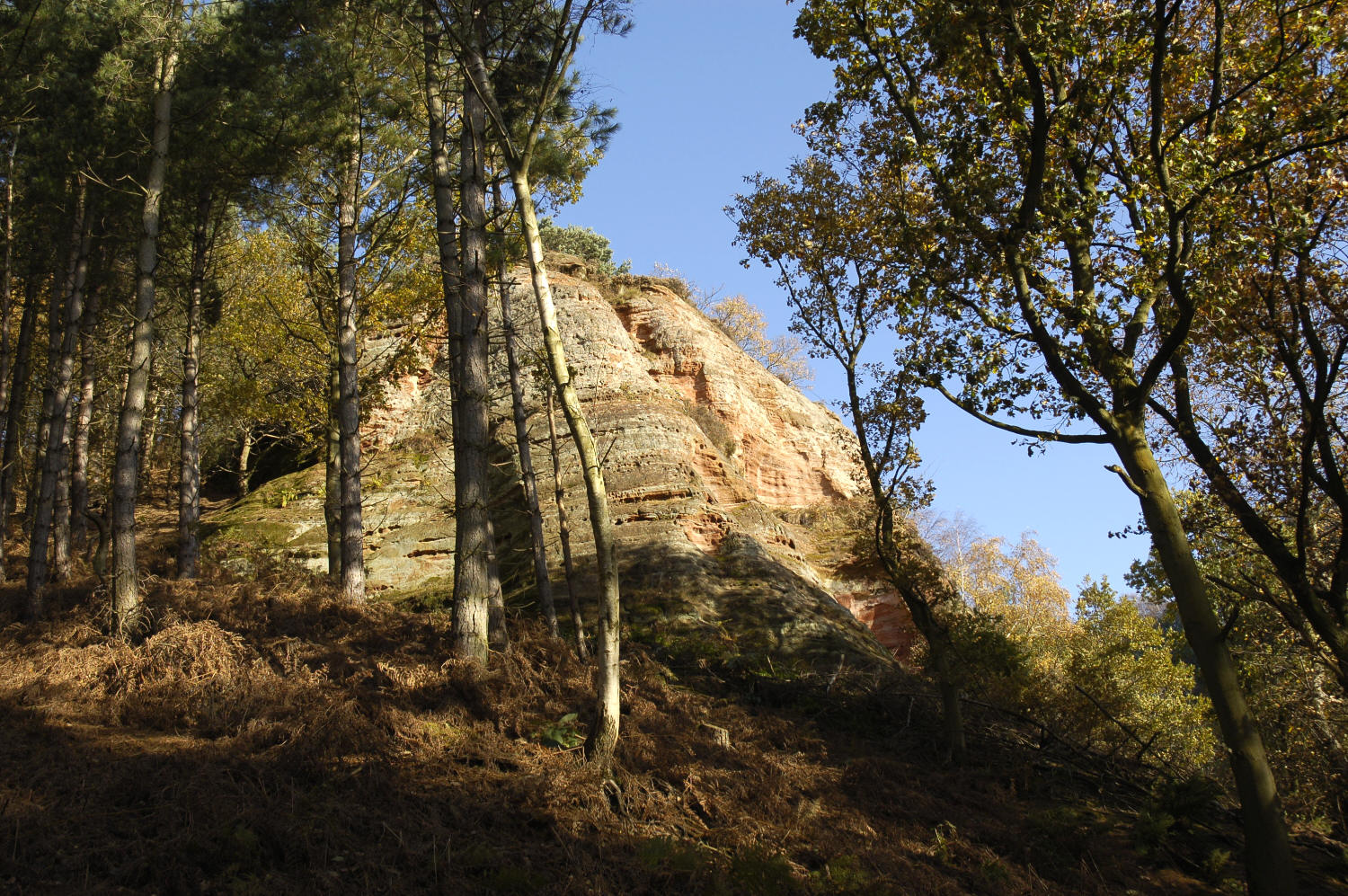
Exposed sandstone at Raw Head

A total of 13.51 hectares (33.4 acres) of the northerly Bickerton Hill has been designated a geological SSSI for its exposed sandstones, which provide important insight into the conditions present during the Triassic period. The SSSI is centred on SJ508547, and encompasses the hill's western escarpment, stretching from immediately west of Droppingstone Well, through Raw Head and Musket's Hole, and into Tower Wood. The land is owned by the Bolesworth Estate, and is managed for pheasant shooting, with conifer plantation and mixed woodland.

Wilmslow, Bulkeley Hill and Helsby Sandstone formations of the Sherwood Sandstone Group are present within the site, dating from the Early Triassic period around 250 million years ago. The fine-grained red sandstones which predominate in the lower rock levels represent sedimentation from sandy braided rivers, while the conglomerate beds of Delamere Pebbly Sandstone (a type of Helsby Sandstone formation) which occur in the upper levels represent the deposition of larger particles from coarse-grained braided rivers.

The site was assessed as in a favourable condition by Natural England in 2008. The rock was generally well exposed, despite local vegetation cover. No damage to the rocks was apparent from tree growth, and carved graffiti adjacent to the Raw Head summit was localised and superficial.

== Recreational use, access and facilities ==
The area is popular with recreational walkers and dog walkers. The Sandstone Trail, a long-distance footpath between Frodsham and Whitchurch, runs over the top of the two hills, and there are several other public footpaths and a network of waymarked permissive paths. A total of 8500 walkers on the Sandstone Trail were recorded by the National Trust between January and March 2006, and the trust has estimated that 8000 dog walks occur annually within the Bickerton Hill SSSI. The longer of the two Sandstone Trail Races, organised by Deeside Orienteering Club in early October, goes over the two hills, starting from Duckington and following part of the Sandstone Trail.

Limited access by public road is available to the northerly hill: Coppermine Lane climbs from the A534 to the east of the summit plateau, and New Lane runs from Harthill under the Raw Head ridge to Droppingstone Farm. Goldford Lane, Old Coach Road, Hall Lane, Brown Knowl Lane and Reading Room Lane run around the southerly hill; Sandy Lane runs from Brown Knowl to the edge of the Cuckoo Rock area. Two free car parks, at SJ503530 (Pool Lane, off Goldford Lane, near Bickerton) and SJ494525 (off Old Coach Road, near Duckington), are open during daylight hours. A small additional parking area for the disabled is located off Goldford Lane (SJ501526); it requires advance permission. An easy-access footpath suitable for people of limited mobility runs from this parking area to Maiden Castle. The majority of paths have wicket gates or kissing gates, but there are some stiles.

There is no access off the marked paths. There are no bridleways; cycling is prohibited and horse riding requires a permit on the land owned by the National Trust. Camping and overnight parking are prohibited. Interpretation includes National Trust information boards in the two car parks, Sandstone Trail information boards at multiple points along the trail, and several interpretative signs.

== See also ==
- List of Scheduled Monuments in Cheshire (pre-1066)
- List of Sites of Special Scientific Interest in Cheshire
