= Penketh High School =

Location
- Heath Road; Penketh; Warrington, Cheshire, WA5 2BY; England
- Coordinates: 53.38815°N 2.6477°W

Information
- Type: Academy
- Motto: Dare To Dream / Perseverance
- Department for Education URN: 139506 Tables
- Ofsted: Reports
- Principal: John Carlin
- Head teacher: John Carlin
- Staff: 90
- Gender: Coeducational
- Age: 11 to 16
- Enrolment: 1,028
- Colour: Red+White
- Website: penkethhigh.org

Penketh High School is a secondary school in Penketh, Warrington. It is a co-educational, non-denominational academy school for 11 to 16 year olds. It converted from comprehensive to academy status in April 2013. In April 2018, Mr. John Carlin, one of the youngest headteachers in the United Kingdom, took the role of headteacher at Penketh.

The school has a partnership with Kwadeda High School in South Africa, who helped to produce a feature film called The Opportunity. This film was targeted at teenage audiences, to make them aware of HIV, drugs and other problems, that are high risk factors in South Africa.

== Extra curricular activities ==
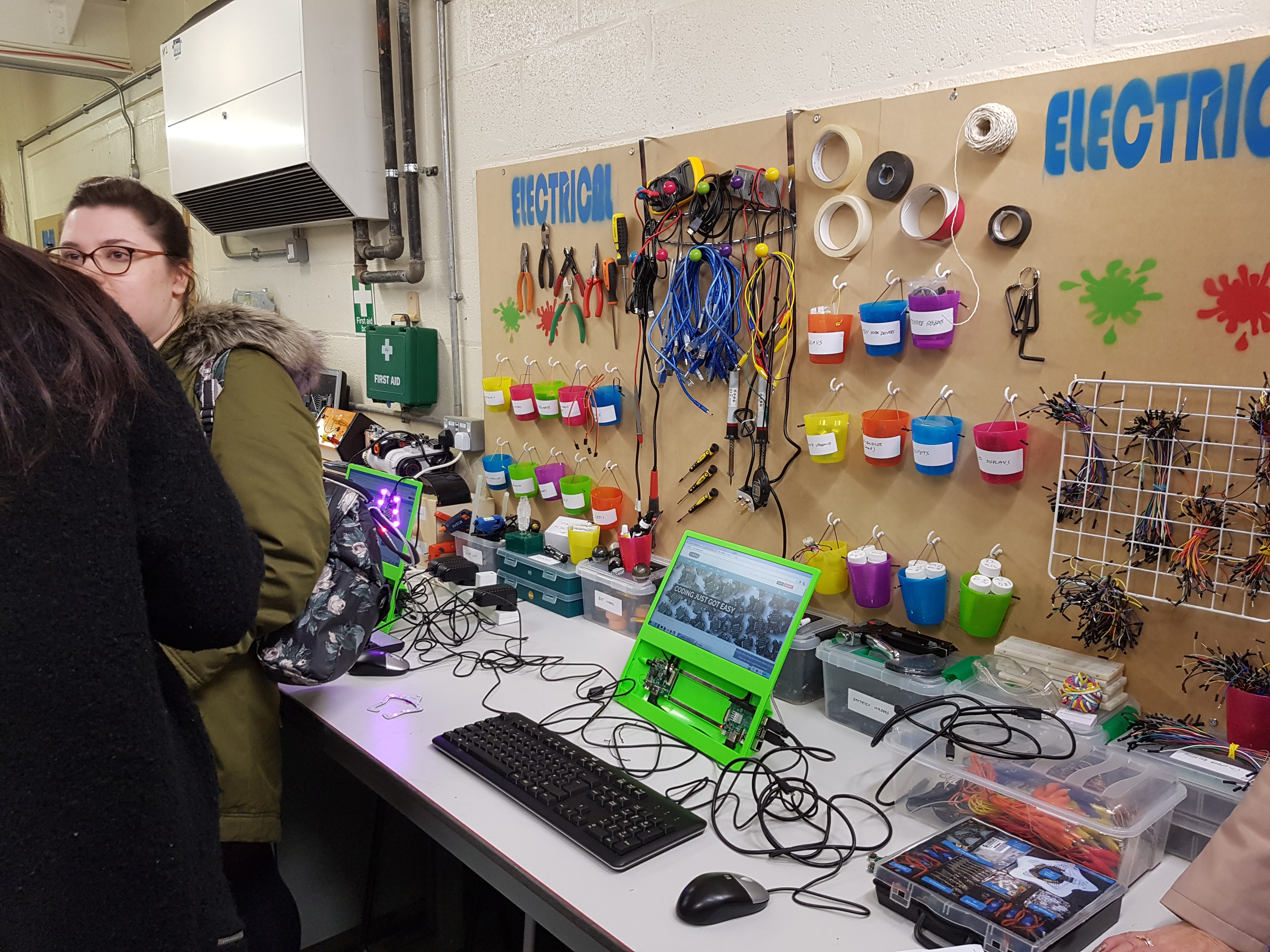
Spark Makerspace Launch

Penketh High School offers a range of extra curricular activities, including: football, rugby, Basketball, Cricket, athletics, trampoline, badminton, dance and volleyball that can be accessed by all skill levels. Students won the football Cheshire Cup in 1996 & 2017.

The music department offers a range of group and individual lessons. The groups are run at no cost. The individual lessons may have a charge. Drama Club and/or Performing Arts Club. Drama is purely acting whereas Performing Arts is a mixture of acting, singing and dancing. The art department runs an Art club after school for Years 7 an 8. The ICT department houses a homework club for all years every break time and after school.

This is for all homework for which pupils need access to office software and/or the internet. Other extra curricular activities include STEM Club, Robotics and wearable technology, as well as student led clubs from 2018 in the school Makerspace. In February 2018, Penketh High School became the first school in the United Kingdom to embed Maker Education within the National Curriculum.

Spark Penketh makerspace runs within school time and outside of school lessons. In March 2018, Penketh students won the Maths Fest 2018 taking first place at the event ran by the Further Mathematics Support Programme. Penketh became a Future Physics Leader Programme School in March 2018. Penketh Student also won the Sellafield Big Bang Project against twelve other regional schools.

== Notable former pupils ==
- Warren Brown, actor
- Robin Jarvis, novelist
- Gary Owen, football midfielder
- Chris Riley, rugby league player
