= Warrington Rural District =

Historical rural district

Coordinates: 53.409°N 2.587°W

- History
  - Created: 1894
  - Abolished: 1974
  - Succeeded by: Warrington
- Status: Rural district

Warrington Rural District was, from 1894 to 1974, a local government district in the administrative county of Lancashire.

It was formed a rural district under the Local Government Act 1894 from the Warrington rural sanitary district, and was centred on territory north of the town of Warrington (which was broadly shared with, but separate from, the County Borough of Warrington). In 1974, the district was abolished and became part of the new Borough of Warrington which was transferred to Cheshire.

== Boundaries ==
It covered the following parishes initially:

- Burtonwood
- Cuerdley
- Great Sankey
- Houghton, Middleton and Arbury
- Little Sankey
- Penketh
- Poulton with Fearnhead
- Rixton with Glazebrook
- Southworth with Croft
- Winwick with Hulme
- Woolston with Martinscroft

The parish of Little Sankey, which had been formed from that part of Warrington parish not in Warrington borough; was added to Warrington in 1896.

=== Reorganisation ===
The district was reorganised in 1933, by taking in part of the disbanded Leigh Rural District. Several parishes were reorganised

- Burtonwood
- Croft
- Cuerdley
- Great Sankey
- Penketh
- Poulton with Fearnhead
- Rixton with Glazebrook
- Winwick
- Woolston

The district was abolished on 1 April 1974, under the Local Government Act 1972. It became part of the new borough of Warrington in the non-metropolitan county of Cheshire.
