= Bickerton, Cheshire =

Village in Cheshire, England

Coordinates: 53.088°N 2.736°W

Bickerton
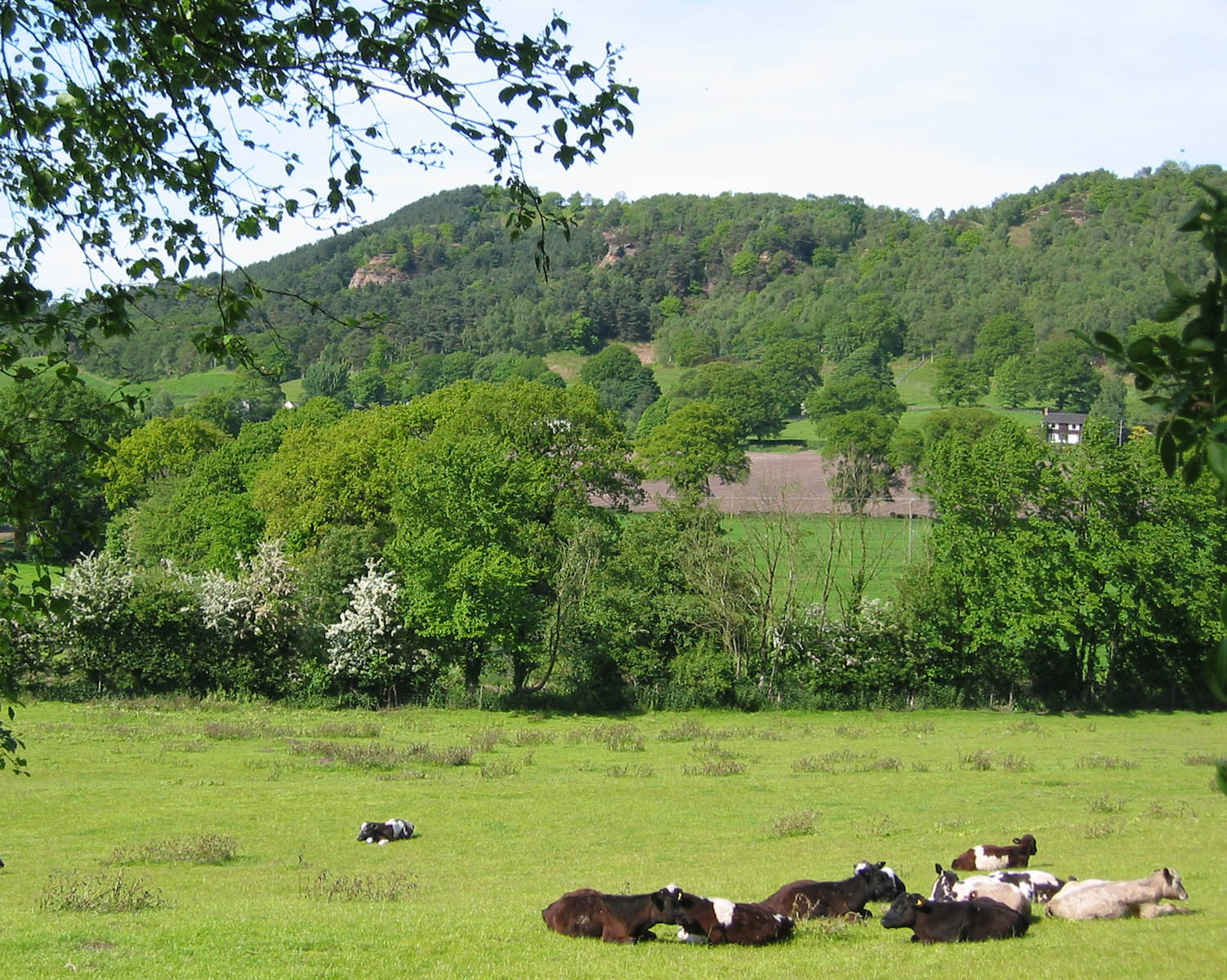
- Northern Bickerton Hill

- Location within Cheshire
- Population: 278 (Including Egerton.2011)
- OS grid reference: SJ507548
- Civil parish: Bickerton
- Unitary authority: Cheshire East
- Ceremonial county: Cheshire
- Region: North West
- Country: England
- Sovereign state: United Kingdom
- Post town: MALPAS
- Postcode district: SY14
- Dialling code: 01829
- Police: Cheshire
- Fire: Cheshire
- Ambulance: North West
- UK Parliament: Chester South and Eddisbury

Bickerton is a village and civil parish in the unitary authority of Cheshire East and the ceremonial county of Cheshire, England, about 8 miles (13 km) north of Whitchurch in Shropshire. The parish also includes the small settlement of Gallantry Bank, with a total population of over 200. The two Bickerton Hills also lie partly within the civil parish.

== History ==
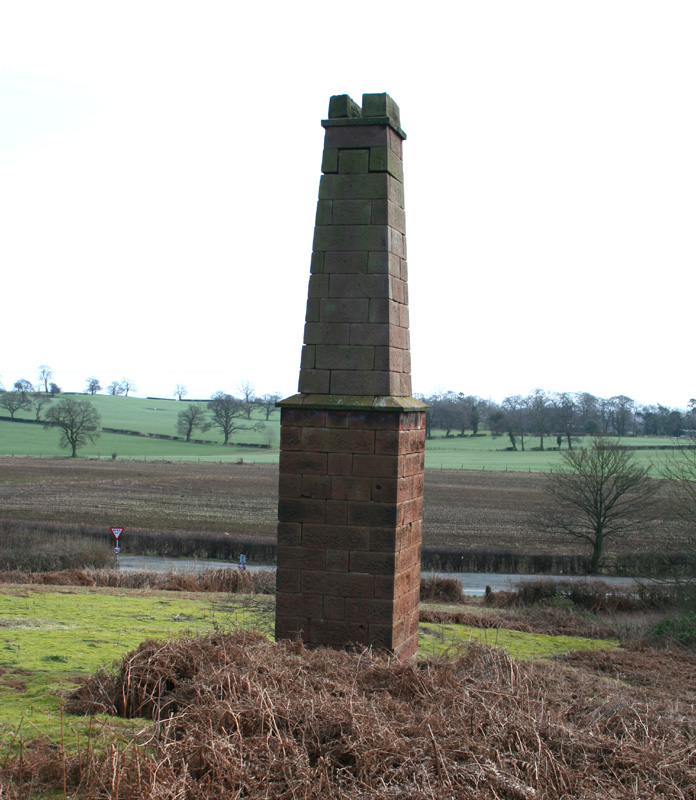
Coppermine chimney

Bickerton appears in the Domesday survey as Bicretone. It was owned by Drogo from Robert FitzHugh, baron of Malpas, and was found waste at the time of the survey. Woodland extending to half a league (about ¾ mile or 1.2 km) was recorded. The name is Anglo-Saxon in origin, and relates to bees. A proposal to build a wind farm at Bickerton was abandoned in 2010 after the company responsible decided the proposed site did not receive enough wind.

== Governance ==
Bickerton is administered jointly with Egerton by the Bickerton & Egerton Parish Council. From 1974 the civil parish was served by Crewe and Nantwich Borough Council, which was succeeded on 1 April 2009 by the unitary authority of Cheshire East. Since 2024 Bickerton has been within the parliamentary constituency of Chester South and Eddisbury which is represented by Aphra Brandreth.

== Geography ==
The majority of the two Bickerton Hills falls within the civil parish, although the parts of the hills are in the Duckington, Larkton and Harthill parishes. Raw Head (SJ508548; 227 metres) lies north of the A534, while the southerly hill (212 m) lies south of the road, immediately northwest of Bickerton village. The area around Raw Head and much of the southerly hill are designated Sites of Special Scientific Interest. A wider area covering much of the north and west of the civil parish is also designated an Area of Special County Value. Around 300 acres (1.2 km^{2}) of the southerly hill are managed by the National Trust.

== Demography ==
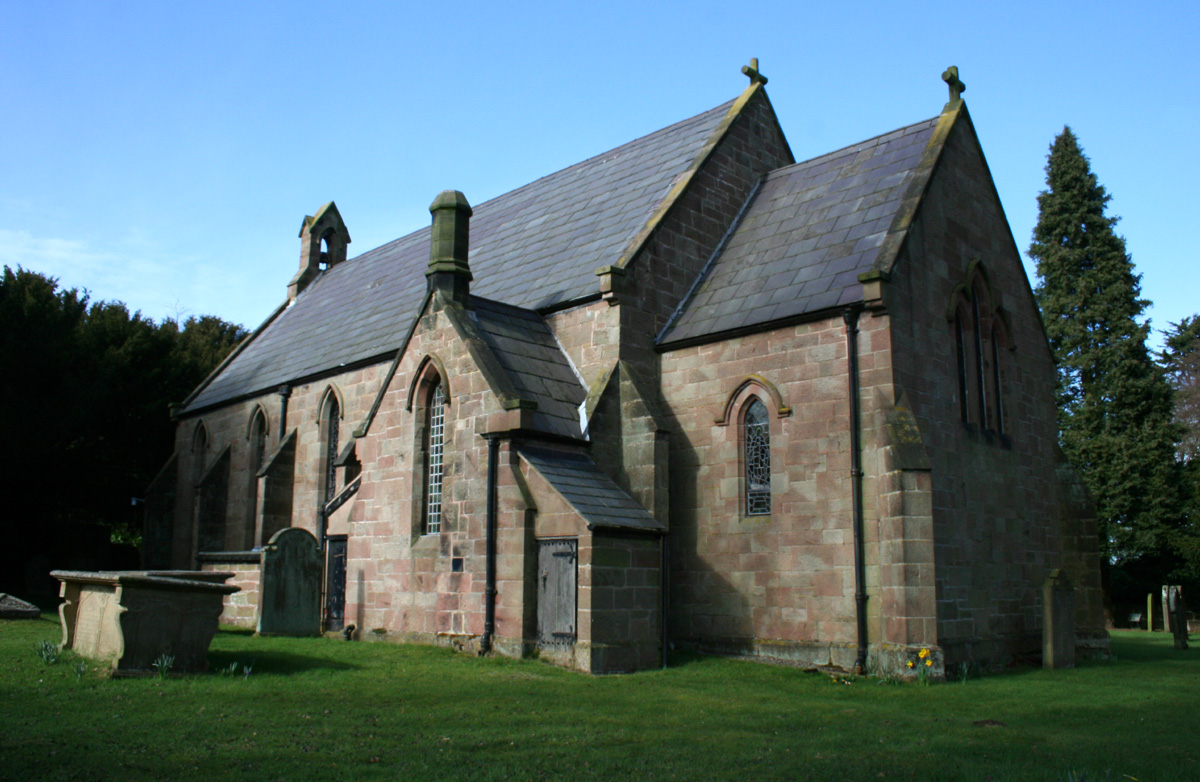
Church of the Holy Trinity

According to the 2001 census the parish had a population of 234, in 90 households. In the 2011 Census, the population of Bickerton and adjacent Egerton was assessed as 278. The population has fallen since the nineteenth century; the historical population figures were 270 (1801), 398 (1851), 323 (1901) and 256 (1951).

== Places of worship ==
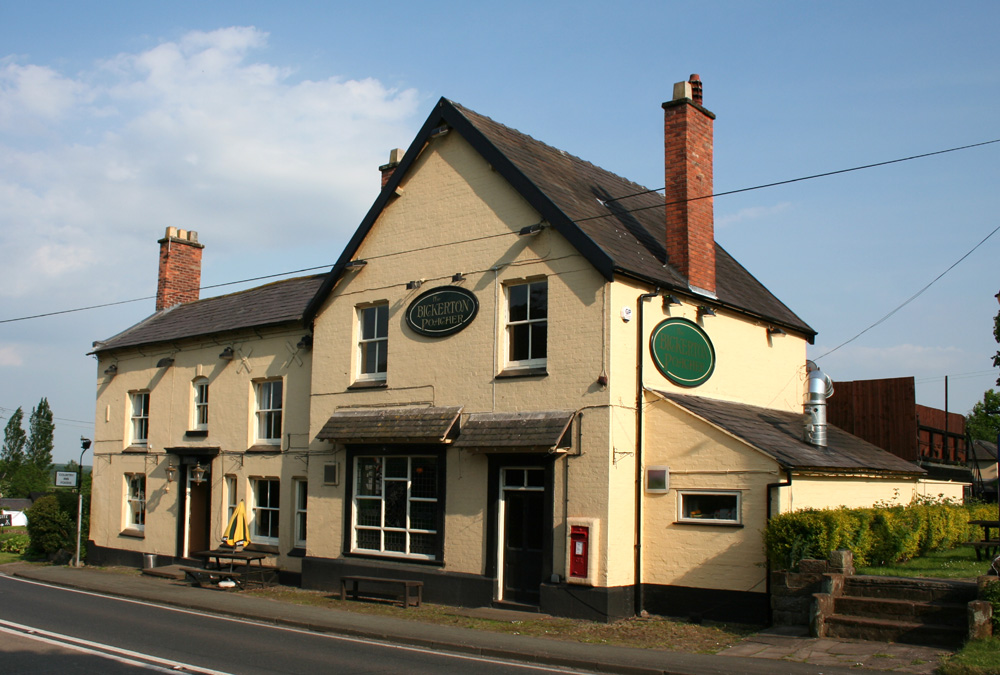
Bickerton Poacher

The Church of the Holy Trinity in Bickerton village dates from 1839, and became a parish church in 1869. Built of red sandstone, with Edmund Sharpe as the architect, it is listed at grade II. A war memorial stands in the adjacent graveyard, overlooking the crossroads of Goldford Lane and Long Lane.

== Other landmarks ==
A disused copper mine chimney in red sandstone is located near Gallantry Bank, adjacent to the A534. Dating from the early 19th century, it is a rare remnant of the copper mining industry in this area. The copper mine was owned by the Egerton family of Oulton, and is thought to have been operational in 1697.

The Bickerton Poacher public house stands on the A534 by the junction with Stone House Lane.

== Transport ==
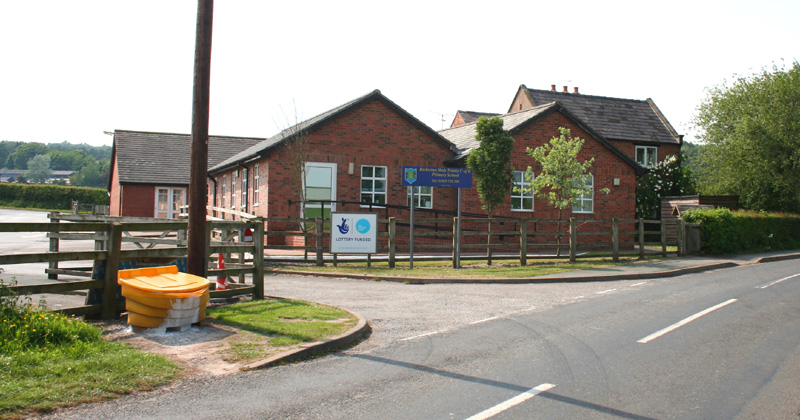
Holy Trinity CE Primary School

The A534 runs east–west through the parish. Other major through routes include Long Lane running south from the A534 towards Malpas, and a lane running southeast from Long Lane to Cholmondeley which connects with the A49. The Sandstone Trail runs east from the summit of the southerly Bickerton Hill, crosses the A534, runs northwest to the summit of Raw Head and then turns south east to climb Bulkeley Hill.

== Education ==
Bickerton Holy Trinity CE Primary School stands on Long Lane. It serves Bickerton as well as the nearby civil parishes of Bulkeley, Cholmondeley, Chorley, Egerton, Ridley and part of Duckington.

Bickerton civil parish falls within the catchment area of Bishop Heber High School in Malpas.

== See also ==
- Listed buildings in Bickerton, Cheshire
