= Listed buildings in Higher Hurdsfield =

Higher Hurdsfield is a civil parish in Cheshire East, England. It contains 13 buildings that are recorded in the National Heritage List for England as designated listed buildings, all of which are at Grade II. This grade is the lowest of the three gradings given to listed buildings and is applied to "buildings of national importance and special interest". The parish lies to the east of the town of Macclesfield, and is mainly rural. The Macclesfield Canal runs along is west border, and there are four listed structures associated with it, two bridges, a milestone, and a culvert with a weir and sluices. The other listed buildings are farmhouses, a former pumping engine house, now in residential use, a road milestone, and three boundary stones.

== Buildings ==
Name and location	Photograph	Date	Notes
Shrigley Fold; 53.27533°N 2.10065°W	—	Mid-16th century	A sandstone farmhouse with stone and brick dressings and a Welsh slate roof. It is in three storeys, with a four-bay front with gables. The windows are sashes. Inside the partition walls are timber-framed with plastered infill.
Doncasterhill Farm; 53.27235°N 2.10205°W	—	c. 1700	This consists of a farmhouse and attached farm buildings that were extended in the 18th and 19th centuries. They are built in sandstone with Kerridge stone slate roofs. The farmhouse is in two storeys, with a four-bay front. The windows are casements, those in the upper floor being in half-dormers. The farm buildings form the northern side of a courtyard.
Jenny's Farmhouse; 53.27263°N 2.10473°W		1713	The farmhouse is built in sandstone with Kerridge stone slate roofs. It has a T-shaped plan, is in two storeys, and has a three-bay front. The windows are casements, those in the upper floor being in gabled half-dormers.There are extensions in stone and brick.
Shoresclough Farmhouse; 53.27128°N 2.10485°W	—	Early 18th century	The farmhouse was altered in the 19th century. It is built in sandstone with a Kerridge stone slate roof. It has a double-pile plan, is in two storeys, and has a two-bay south front. On the front are two gables with bargeboards, and three-light windows, those in the lower floor having mullions.
Milestone; 53.26791°N 2.10349°W		Late 18th century	The sandstone milestone has a triangular plan and a shaped top. It records in black paint the distances in miles to Macclesfield, Chapel-en-le-Frith, Sheffield, and Chesterfield.
Sedgewood Mill; 53.27499°N 2.09921°W	—	Late 18th century	This was built as a pumping engine house for a small coal mine, and was converted for domestic use in the 19th century, with later extensions. It is built in sandstone with Kerridge stone slate roofs; the extensions have slate roofs. The building is mainly in three storeys, the lower storey being partly built into the sloping ground. Associated with the building is the truncated remains of the chimney stack.
Parish boundary stone 53.28046°N 2.09138°W		Late 18th to early 19th century	The stone marks the boundary between the parishes of Higher Hurdsfield and Bollington. It consists of a rectangular block set into a garden wall and inscribed with the letter "B".
Canal bridge No. 33; 53.27012°N 2.10705°W		c. 1830	A footbridge over the Macclesfield Canal, designed by William Crosley. It is built in Kerridge stone, and consists of an elliptical arch, voussoirs and keystones, a parapet, and piers at the ends.
Canal bridge No. 35; 53.26353°N 2.10706°W		c. 1830	A bridge carrying Higher Fence Road over the Macclesfield Canal, designed by William Crosley. It is built in Kerridge stone, and is a skew bridge. It consists of an elliptical arch, voussoirs and keystones, a parapet, and piers at the ends.
Sluices, weir and culvert 53.27121°N 2.10728°W		c. 1830	The culvert carries Shoresclough Brook under the Macclesfield Canal. The brook is dammed and a weir and sluice control its flow through the circular culvert. There is another sluice controlling the level of the canal. It is all constructed in sandstone.
Canal milestone 53.26970°N 2.10697°W	—	c. 1831	A rough milestone with a rounded top. On it are inscriptions recording the distances in miles to Marple and Hall Green.
Parish boundary stone 53.26051°N 2.10406°W	—	1849	The boundary stone marks the boundary between the parishes of Higher Hurdsfield and Macclesfield. It is sited on a dam wall and consists of a sandstone block with a semicircular head inscribed with "M1849" and "H1849".
Parish boundary stone 53.26050°N 2.10200°W	—	1849	The boundary stone marks the boundary between the parishes of Higher Hurdsfield and Macclesfield. It is sited on a dam wall and consists of a sandstone block with a semicircular head inscribed with "M1849" and "H1849".

== See also ==
- Listed buildings in Bollington
- Listed buildings in Macclesfield
- Listed buildings in Rainow
