= Penketh =

Civil parish in Cheshire, England

Coordinates: 53.3874°N 2.6561°W

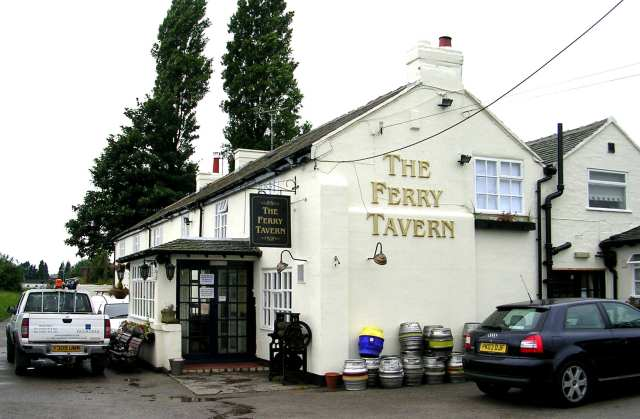
- The Ferry Tavern public house, Penketh

- Location within Cheshire
- Population: 8,699 (2001)
- OS grid reference: SJ595891
- Civil parish: Penketh
- Unitary authority: Warrington
- Ceremonial county: Cheshire
- Region: North West
- Country: England
- Sovereign state: United Kingdom
- Post town: Warrington
- Postcode district: WA5
- Dialling code: 01925
- Police: Cheshire
- Fire: Cheshire
- Ambulance: North West
- UK Parliament: Warrington South

Penketh is a civil parish and suburb of Warrington in the Borough of Warrington, Cheshire, England. It is located about 3 miles (4.8 km) west of Warrington town centre. It has a population of 8,699. It is in the historic county of Lancashire. The emblem/badge of Penketh is three kingfishers.

== Toponymy ==
The name Penketh is first attested in 1243 as Penket and similar forms. The name is derived from two Common Brittonic words: *penno- (head) and *kēto- (trees), corresponding to modern Welsh pen coed (the place-name Pencoed is found widely in Wales). Thus the name once meant "end of the wood", suggesting that the parish was at one time on the outskirts of a forest.

== History ==
Penketh was originally part of Prescot parish but became a chapelry and then a separate parish. It grew due to the crossing over the Mersey at Fiddlers Ferry and the building of the Sankey Canal. The area was mainly rural and agricultural until well into the 20th century, though a tannery and boatyard were established in the 19th century.

The last 50 years has seen the area transformed into a large residential suburb.

== Governance ==
Within the boundaries of the historic county of Lancashire, the parish has a Parish Council and is a ward of Warrington Borough. It is in Warrington South constituency of the United Kingdom Parliament. Until the major local government reorganisation of 1974, Penketh was part of Warrington Rural District.

== Industry ==
The former tannery and boatyard were the only major industries in Penketh. Fiddlers Ferry Power Station dominates Penketh, though it is in Cuerdley parish.

== Churches ==
There is a parish church (St Paul's, Church of England), and a Catholic church (St Joseph's). There is a strong nonconformist tradition as exemplified by the Methodist chapel in Chapel Road. The Quakers were well represented at one time; the Meeting House was the present village hall on Meeting Lane.

== Schools ==
The secondary schools in the area are Penketh High School and St Gregory's Catholic High School (which isn't actually in Penketh). The primary schools in the area are Penketh Community Primary School (a feeder school for Penketh High School), Penketh South Primary School, St Joseph's Catholic Primary School and St Vincent's Catholic Primary School.

== Transport ==
Railway stations in the area include local services from Sankey for Penketh on the Liverpool to Manchester Line (with express services along this route available from Warrington Central), as well as Warrington Bank Quay on the West Coast Main Line. Frequent buses link Penketh with Warrington town centre: it is the terminus for Warrington's Own Buses (routes 30, 30B, 31 and 32A), and the north of Penketh is also served by Warrington's Own Buses routes 14 and 15. Arriva North West inter-urban services also serve the main road through Penketh, heading towards Widnes and Runcorn (route 110) and to Huyton and Liverpool (route 7). Penketh is on the A562 road linking Warrington with the Silver Jubilee Bridge. The nearest airports are Liverpool and Manchester.

== Business Park ==
Penketh Business Park (actually located in Great Sankey) is a large 6.5-acre business park in the area located off Liverpool Road. The business park consists of mixed used businesses across 30 warehouses between 400 square feet and 44,500 square feet in size, as well as 21 storage units and a small parcel of land. The business park is most well known for its large indoor Skate Park named Ramp1 which temporarily closed in June 2023, reopening in February 2024, other businesses operating out of this business park include a gym (Ascendancy Fitness Gym), a metal fabrications business M C C Fabrications, and a landscape business (EDR Landscapes).

== Demographics ==
- 7,340 residents
- 2,993 households
- 29.4% of all residents have no qualifications (approximately 2,158 residents)
- 2.06% are unemployed (approximately 154 residents)

=== Race and gender ===
- 48% males to 52% females
- 98.3% are of white race
- 0.6% are of mixed origin
- 0.7% are of Asian origin
- 0.1% are of black race
- 0.4% are of "other" race

=== Housing demographics ===
- 92.0% Owner occupied
- 3.7% are council accommodation
- 0.4% are rented from a housing association
- 2.0% are private rentals
- 1.3% are rentals from other sources
- 0.6% are undisclosed

== See also ==
- Listed buildings in Penketh
