= Macclesfield Rural District =

Former local government area in the UK

Coordinates: 53°20′N 2°8′W

Macclesfield RD within Cheshire in 1970

Macclesfield Rural District was a rural district of Cheshire, England from 1894 to 1974.

Macclesfield as a Municipal Borough and Bollington as an urban district formed an enclave which was surrounded by Macclesfield RD.

The district was formed in 1894 based on Macclesfield rural sanitary district by the Local Government Act 1894. It was abolished under the Local Government Act 1972 in 1974 and became part of the new Macclesfield borough, which was itself abolished in 2009.

== Civil parishes within the former area ==
- Adlington
- Bosley
- Chelford
- Chorley
- Eaton
- Gawsworth
- Great Warford
- Henbury
- Higher Hurdsfield
- Kettleshulme
- Knutsford
- Lyme Handley
- Macclesfield Forest
- Marton
- Mottram St. Andrew
- Nether Alderley
- North Rode
- Over Alderley
- Pott Shrigley
- Poynton-with-Worth
- Prestbury
- Rainow
- Siddington
- Snelson
- Sutton
- Wildboarclough
- Wincle
- Withington
