= Bucklow Rural District =

Former local government area in the UK

Coordinates: 53°20′N 2°19′W

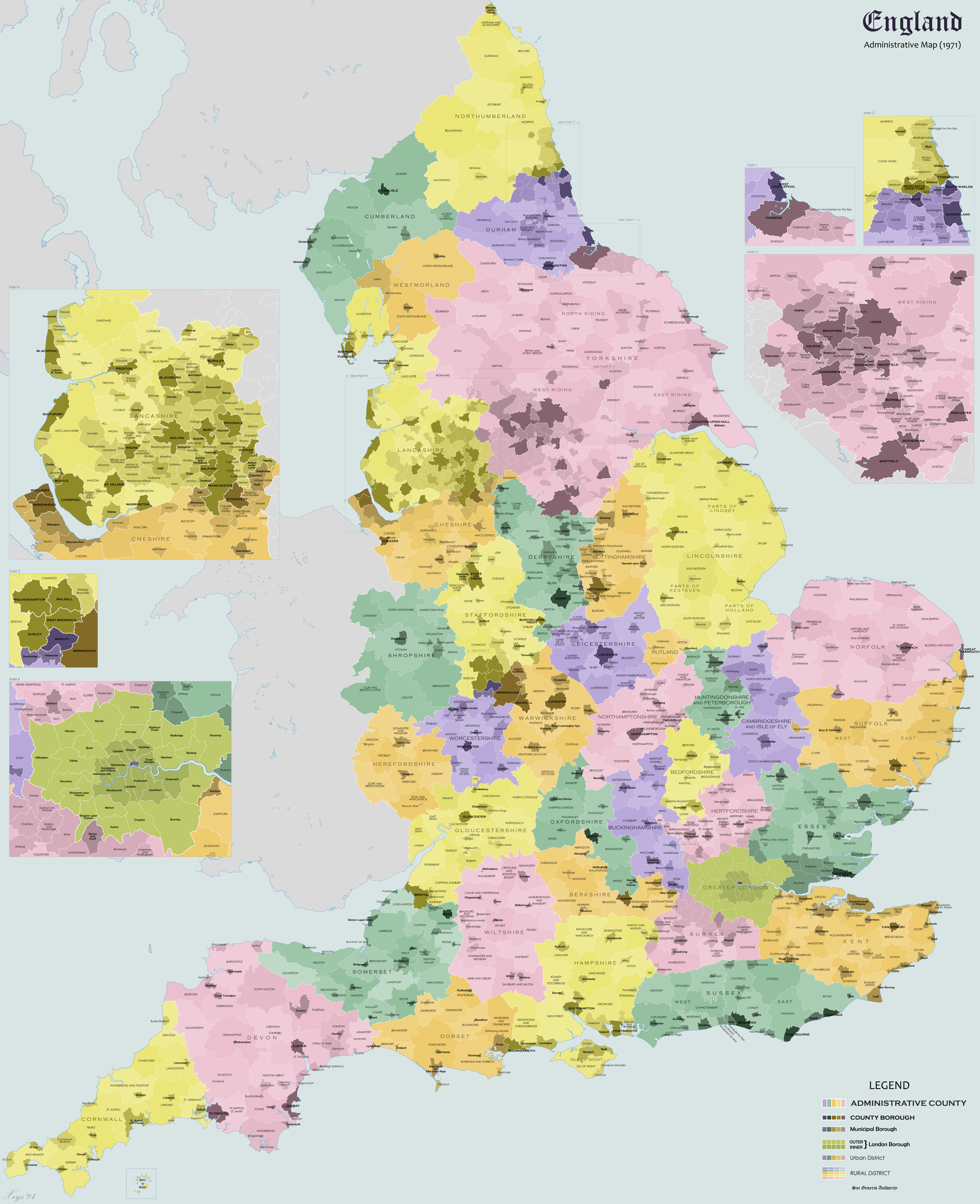
- History
  - Created: 1894
  - Abolished: 1974
  - Succeeded by: Metropolitan Borough of Trafford; City of Manchester; Borough of Macclesfield
- Status: Rural district

Bucklow Rural District was, from 1894 to 1974, a local government district in the north of the administrative county of Cheshire, England. Following the Local Government Act 1972, this rural district was split between the new Greater Manchester boroughs of Trafford and Manchester, and Macclesfield, which was retained in Cheshire.

Knutsford was an enclave and independent urban district surrounded by Bucklow RD, as was Altrincham until it expanded enough to link up with other districts in the north.

The district was formed in 1894 based on Altrincham rural sanitary district by the Local Government Act 1894. It was known as the Altrincham Rural District until 1895. The three civil parishes of Northenden, Northen Etchells and Baguley were also part of the Bucklow Rural District until 1931, when Manchester Corporation, which had been given the Wythenshawe estate for municipal housing development, successfully petitioned Parliament to enable their transfer into Manchester.

It was abolished and split up under the Local Government Act 1972 in 1974. The parish of Ringway (including Manchester Airport) went to Manchester, and the parishes of Carrington, Dunham Massey, Partington and Warburton went to Trafford. The remainder remained in Cheshire and became part of the new Macclesfield district.
