= Medhurst Green =

Hamlet in Cheshire, England

Coordinates: 53.1624°N 2.2712°W

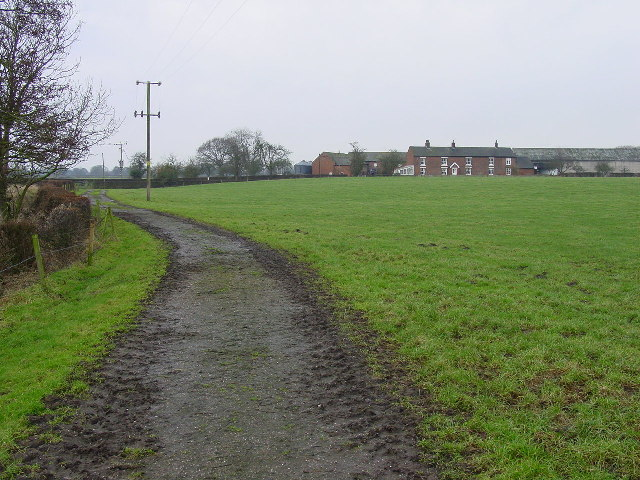
Lower Medhurst Green Farm

Medhurst Green is a hamlet in Cheshire, England that forms part of the civil parish of Brereton. It consists mainly of two farms, Upper and Lower Medhurst Green Farm, which were also known as Meadowsgreen Farm and Lower Meadowsgreen Farm. The former is located on the A534 road about 5 kilometres (3 mi) west of Congleton where a minor road towards the latter branches off in a northerly direction. The hamlet is served by a bus stop near Upper Medhurst Green Farm.
