= Nantwich Rural District =

Former local government area in the UK

Nantwich RD within Cheshire in 1970

Nantwich Rural District was a division of Cheshire until 1974, when it merged with the Nantwich and Crewe urban districts to create the Borough of Crewe and Nantwich, which was itself abolished in 2009.
