= Larkton =

Former civil parish in Cheshire, England

Coordinates: 53.07°N 2.754°W

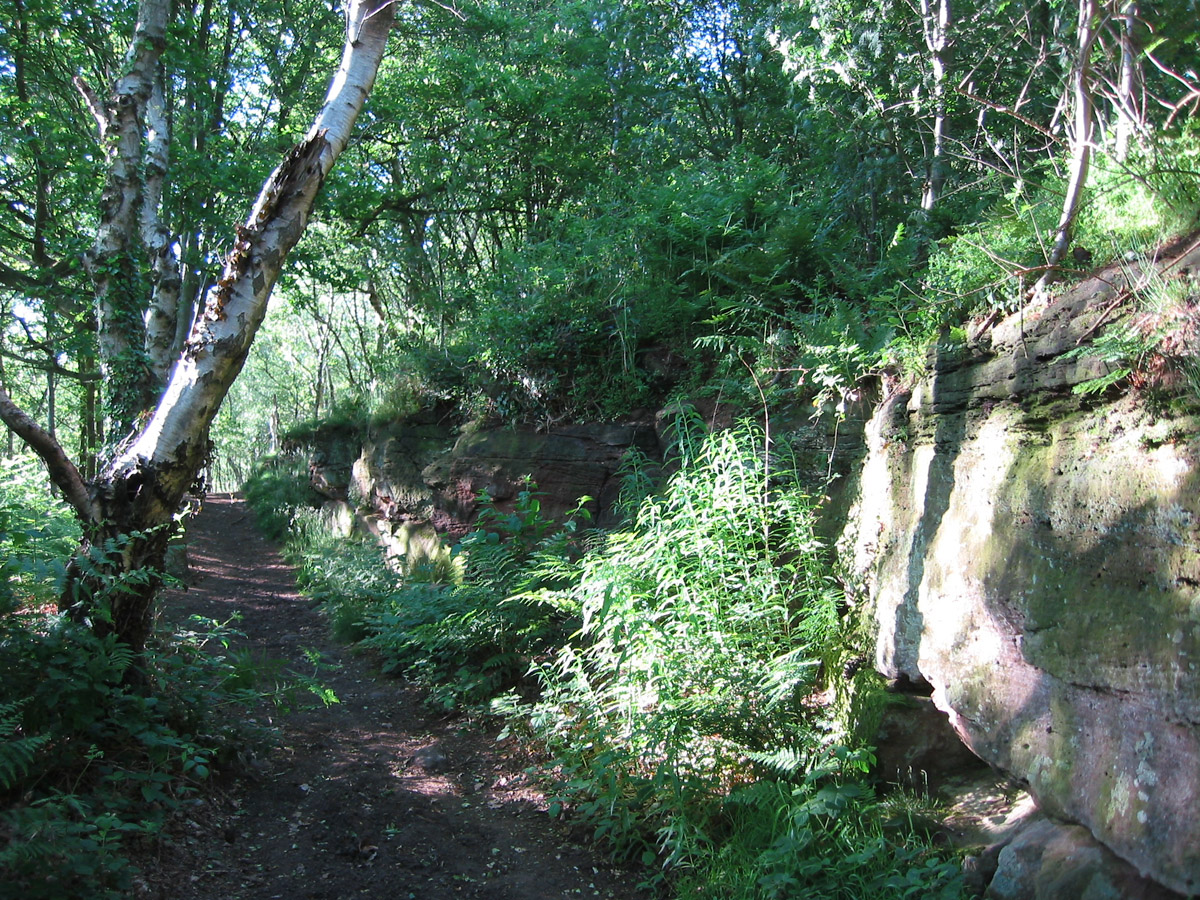
- Hether Wood, Larkton Hill

- Location within Cheshire
- Population: 28 (2001)
- OS grid reference: SJ496528
- Civil parish: No Man's Heath and District
- Unitary authority: Cheshire West and Chester
- Ceremonial county: Cheshire
- Region: North West
- Country: England
- Sovereign state: United Kingdom
- Post town: MALPAS
- Postcode district: SY14
- Dialling code: 01948
- Police: Cheshire
- Fire: Cheshire
- Ambulance: North West
- UK Parliament: Chester South and Eddisbury

Larkton is a former civil parish, now in the parish of No Man's Heath and District, in the Cheshire West and Chester district and ceremonial county of Cheshire in England. In 2001 it had a population of 28.

The name Larkton is likely derived from Old English läwerce, "lark" and tun, "farm", "settlement". Larkton was anciently a township of the old parish of Malpas, and was also a manor owned by the Cheshire family of Cholmondeley.

Larkton Hill, part of the larger Bickerton Hill, was formerly the site of small-scale sandstone quarrying. It was once an area of commonland covering about 44 acres until an inclosure act of the mid 19th century.

The parish contained one structure designated by English Heritage as a listed building. This is Larkton House, a stone farmhouse dating from the late 18th century, which is listed at Grade II. Larkton was formerly a township in the parish of Malpas, in 1866 Larkton became a separate civil parish. On 1 April 2015 the civil parish was united with Bickley and parts of other parishes, under the terms of the Local Government and Public Involvement in Health Act 2007, to form No Man's Heath and District.
