= Higher Hurdsfield =

Village in Cheshire, England

Coordinates: 53.271°N 2.096°W

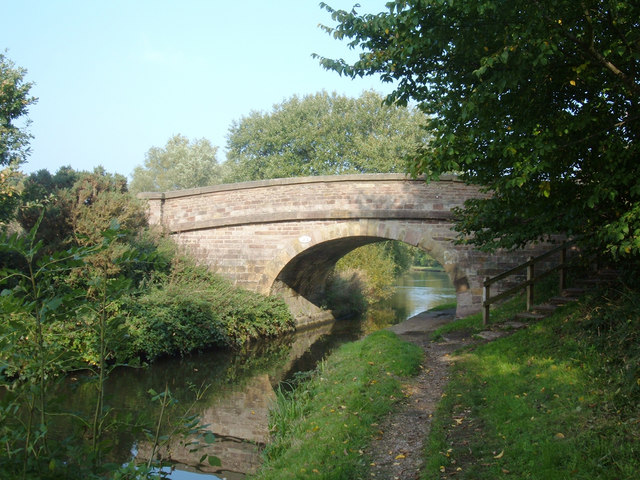
- Bridge number 33, Macclesfield Canal

- Location within Cheshire
- Population: 717 (2011)
- OS grid reference: SJ935749
- Civil parish: Higher Hurdsfield
- Unitary authority: Cheshire East
- Ceremonial county: Cheshire
- Region: North West
- Country: England
- Sovereign state: United Kingdom
- Post town: MACCLESFIELD
- Postcode district: SK10
- Dialling code: 01625
- Police: Cheshire
- Fire: Cheshire
- Ambulance: North West
- UK Parliament: Macclesfield

Higher Hurdsfield is a village and civil parish in the unitary authority of Cheshire East and the ceremonial county of Cheshire, England. Higher Hurdsfield Parish Council is the lowest tier of government serving the residents. It has a population of around 300, increasing at the 2011 Census to 717, and is situated on the eastern outskirts of Macclesfield, approximately 7 miles (11 km) from the border of Derbyshire and Cheshire. The nearest village is Rainow.

Hurdsfield Golf Club (now defunct) was founded in 1900. The club continued until the time of WW2.

== See also ==
- Listed buildings in Higher Hurdsfield
