= Borough of Warrington =

Unitary authority area in Cheshire, England

- Borough and unitary authority
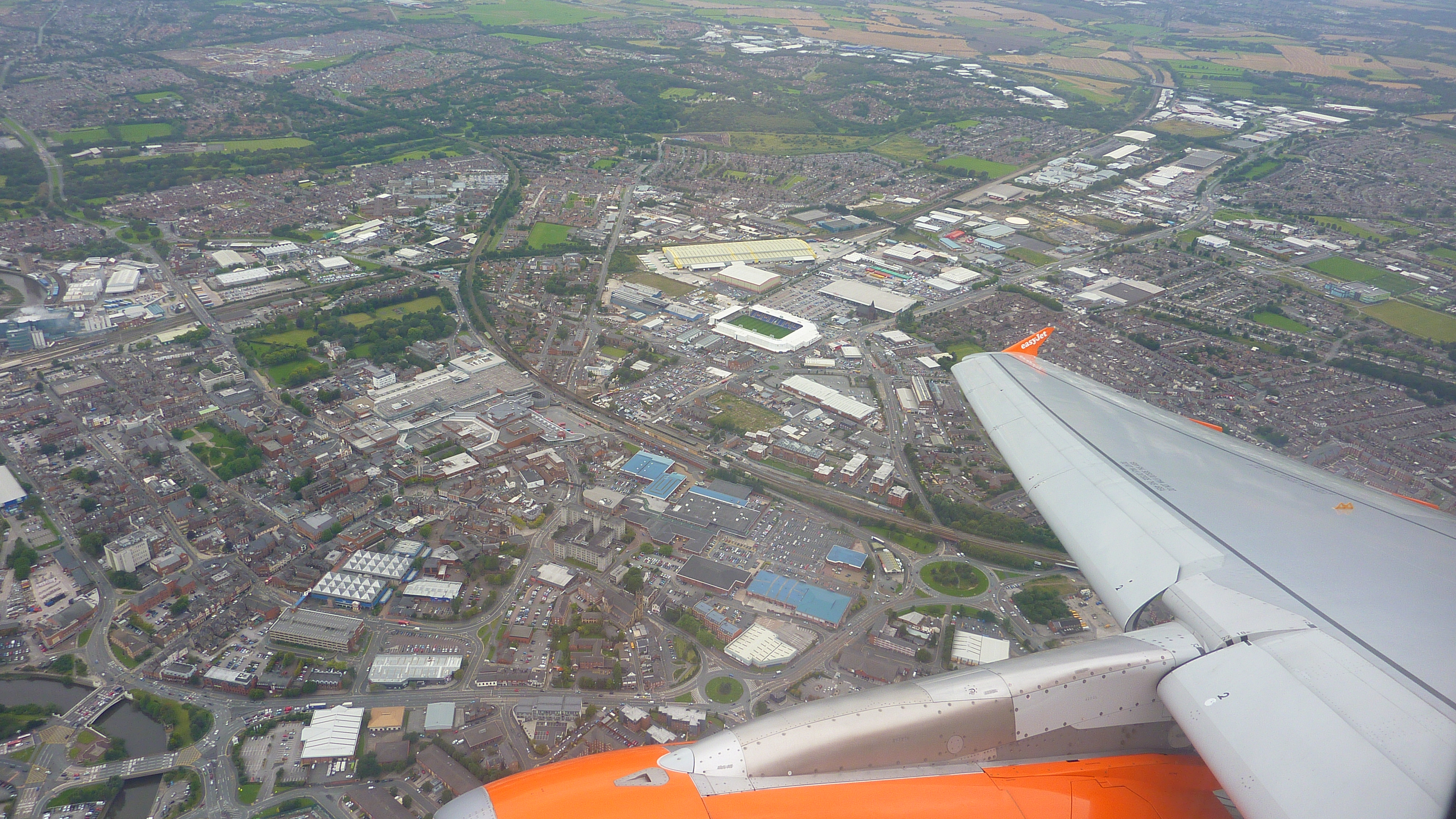
- Aerial view of Warrington
- Motto: Latin: Deus Dat Incrementum, lit. 'God giveth the increase'
- Warrington shown within Cheshire
- Coordinates: 53.3895°N 2.5909°W
- Sovereign state: United Kingdom
- Country: England
- Region: North West
- Ceremonial county: Cheshire
- Historic counties: Cheshire; Lancashire
- Incorporated: 1 April 1974
- Unitary authority: 1 April 1998
- Named for: Warrington
- Administrative HQ: Warrington Town Hall

Government
  - Type: Unitary authority
  - Body: Warrington Borough Council
  - Executive: Leader and cabinet
  - Control: Labour
  - Leader: Hans Mundry (L)
  - Mayor: Sagheer Zaman (L)
  - MPs: Sarah Hall (L); Charlotte Nichols (L)

Area
  - Total: 70 sq mi (181 km^{2})
  - Rank: 151st

Population (2025)
  - Total: 215,425
  - Rank: 91st
  - Density: 3,090/sq mi (1,193/km^{2})
- Demonym: Warringtonian

Ethnicity (2021)
  - Ethnic groups: List: 93.5% White; 3.3% Asian; 1.6% Mixed; 0.7% Black; 0.9% other

Religion (2021)
  - Religion: List: 56.7% Christianity; 34.6% no religion; 1.7% Islam; 0.7% Hinduism; 0.3% Buddhism; 0.2% Sikhism; 0.1% Judaism; 0.4% other; 5.2% not stated
- Time zone: UTC+0 (GMT)
  - Summer (DST): UTC+1 (BST)
- Postcode areas: WA1–5, WA13
- Dialling codes: 01925
- ISO 3166 code: GB-WRT
- GSS code: E06000007
- Website: warrington.gov.uk

The Borough of Warrington is a unitary authority area with borough status in the ceremonial county of Cheshire, England. The borough is centred around the town of Warrington, and extends out into outlying villages of Lymm and Great Sankey and the town of Birchwood.

The borough is geographically located to the north and northeast of the Cheshire West and Chester and Halton districts in Cheshire, the metropolitan borough of St Helens in Merseyside to the northwest and north and the metropolitan boroughs of Wigan, Salford and Trafford in Greater Manchester to the northeast, east, and southeast. Additionally, to the south-east, the borough borders Cheshire East. The borough is also located between the cities of Liverpool, Manchester, Chester and Preston. The district straddles the historic counties of Cheshire (the southern part of the district includes Lymm and Stockton Heath) and Lancashire (the northern part including Warrington itself and Latchford).

== Civil parishes ==
The borough contains the unparished area of Warrington and 18 civil parishes:

- Appleton
- Birchwood
- Burtonwood and Westbrook
- Croft
- Cuerdley
- Culcheth and Glazebury
- Grappenhall and Thelwall
- Great Sankey
- Hatton
- Lymm
- Penketh
- Poulton-with-Fearnhead
- Rixton-with-Glazebrook
- Stockton Heath
- Stretton
- Walton
- Winwick
- Woolston

== History ==
The borough was historically split between the historic counties of Cheshire and Lancashire.

The whole part of the borough north of the River Mersey was within the historic boundaries of the county of Lancashire which includes the town of Warrington, and the areas of Latchford, Great Sankey, Culcheth, Glazebury, Burtonwood and Birchwood.

The whole part of the borough south of the River Mersey was within the historic boundaries of the county of Cheshire which includes the villages of Lymm, Stockton Heath, Appleton Thorn and Stretton.

In 1974, local government reforms saw many old counties and districts abolished and new counties and districts were created. Warrington along with the neighboring town of Widnes was moved into the county of Cheshire (which saw the entire area from the border with Speke/Widnes to Glazebury/Cadishead moved into the county of Cheshire). The current borough was formed from the County Borough of Warrington, the wards of Culcheth and Newchurch in Golborne Urban District, Warrington Rural District and part of the parish of Bold in Whiston Rural District, in Lancashire and Lymm Urban District and the parishes of Appleton, Grappenhall, Hatton, Stockton Heath, Stretton and Walton from Runcorn Rural District in Cheshire. The M62 motorway forms a border with both Greater Manchester and Merseyside.

The borough became a unitary authority in 1998 alongside Halton making it separate from the-then Cheshire County Council before the 2009 restructuring of local government which saw the county council abolished and replaced by two new unitary authorities, Cheshire East and Cheshire West (and Chester). All four unitary authorities still form Cheshire for ceremonial purposes and share local services.
