= Pickmere =

Village in Cheshire, England

Coordinates: 53.288°N 2.462°W

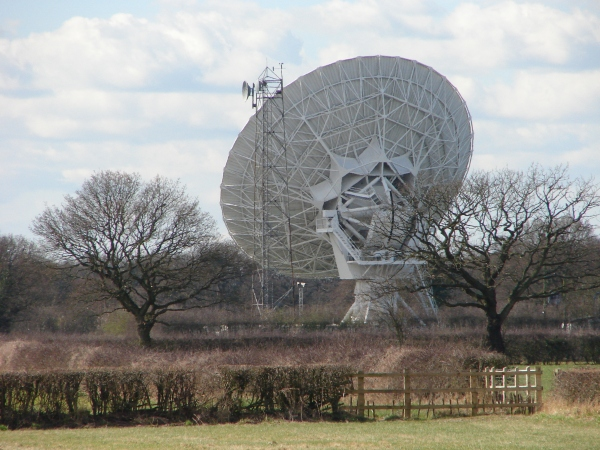
- MERLIN radio telescope, Pickmere

- Location within Cheshire
- Population: 541 (2001)
- OS grid reference: SJ691770
- Civil parish: Pickmere
- Unitary authority: Cheshire East
- Ceremonial county: Cheshire
- Region: North West
- Country: England
- Sovereign state: United Kingdom
- Post town: KNUTSFORD
- Postcode district: WA16
- Dialling code: 01565
- Police: Cheshire
- Fire: Cheshire
- Ambulance: North West
- UK Parliament: Tatton

Pickmere is a village and civil parish near Knutsford in the Borough of Cheshire East. It has a population of 541 (2001 Census). Landmarks in and around the village include a lake, Pick Mere, at grid reference SJ682770.

Pickmere is home to one of the radio telescopes that make up the Jodrell Bank MERLIN (Multi-Element Radio Linked Interferometer Network) radio telescope array linking six observing stations that together form a powerful telescope with an effective aperture of over 217 kilometres.

== See also ==
- Listed buildings in Pickmere
