= Cuerdley =

Coordinates: 53.373°N 2.681°W

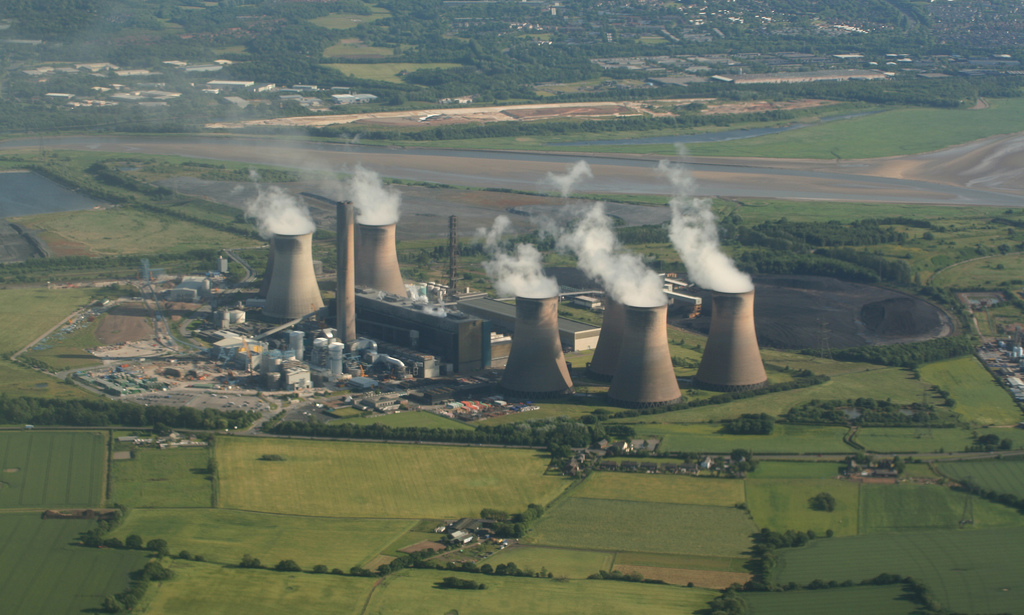
- Fiddlers Ferry Power Station

- Location within Cheshire
- Population: 107 (2001)
- OS grid reference: SJ546864
- Civil parish: Cuerdley
- Unitary authority: Warrington
- Ceremonial county: Cheshire
- Region: North West
- Country: England
- Sovereign state: United Kingdom
- Post town: WARRINGTON
- Postcode district: WA5
- Dialling code: 0151
- Police: Cheshire
- Fire: Cheshire
- Ambulance: North West
- UK Parliament: Warrington South

Cuerdley is a civil parish in the Borough of Warrington, Cheshire, England. It has a population of 107 (2001 census) and much of its area is farmland. A large part of Cuerdley is occupied by the Fiddlers Ferry Power Station, which was decommissioned in 2020. The small settlement of Cuerdley Cross is on the A562 (Widnes Road) to the north of the power station site.

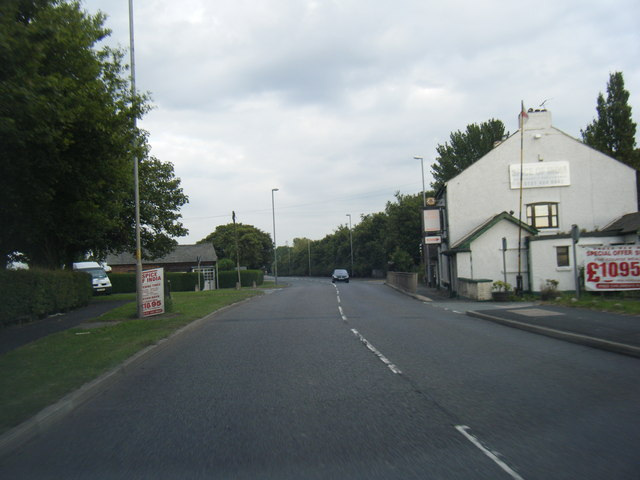
Widnes Road at Cuerdley Cross

The parish is crossed by a railway line, which used to serve the power station, and the disused St Helens Canal is alongside it. There was a short-lived station named Cuerdley in the 19th century.

A small part of the parish is detached from the rest, being south of the River Mersey, between the river and the Manchester Ship Canal.
