= Duckington =

Village in Cheshire, England

Coordinates: 53.063°N 2.762°W

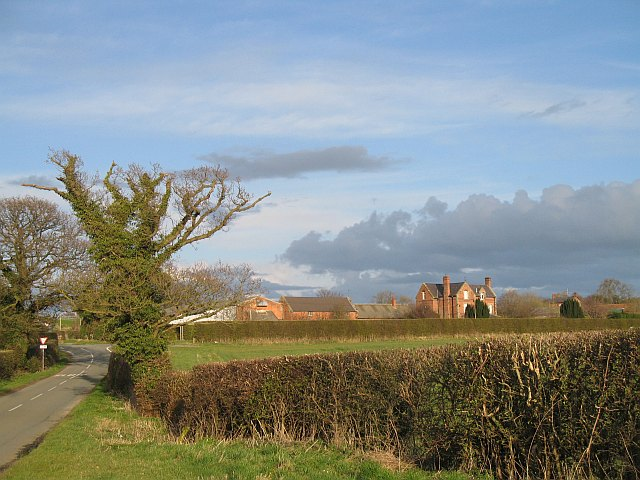
- Duckington Farm, across the A41

- Location within Cheshire
- OS grid reference: SJ490519
- Civil parish: Duckington
- Unitary authority: Cheshire West and Chester
- Ceremonial county: Cheshire
- Region: North West
- Country: England
- Sovereign state: United Kingdom
- Post town: MALPAS
- Postcode district: SY14
- Dialling code: 01829
- Police: Cheshire
- Fire: Cheshire
- Ambulance: North West
- UK Parliament: Chester South and Eddisbury

Duckington is a small village and civil parish in the unitary authority of Cheshire West and Chester and the ceremonial county of Cheshire, England. It is situated some 10 1/2 miles (17 km) south-east of Chester, 10 miles (16 km) east of Wrexham and 4 1/3 miles (7 km) east of the Welsh border.

== See also ==
- Listed buildings in Duckington
