= Ellesmere Port =

Town in Cheshire, England

Coordinates: 53.279°N 2.897°W

- Town
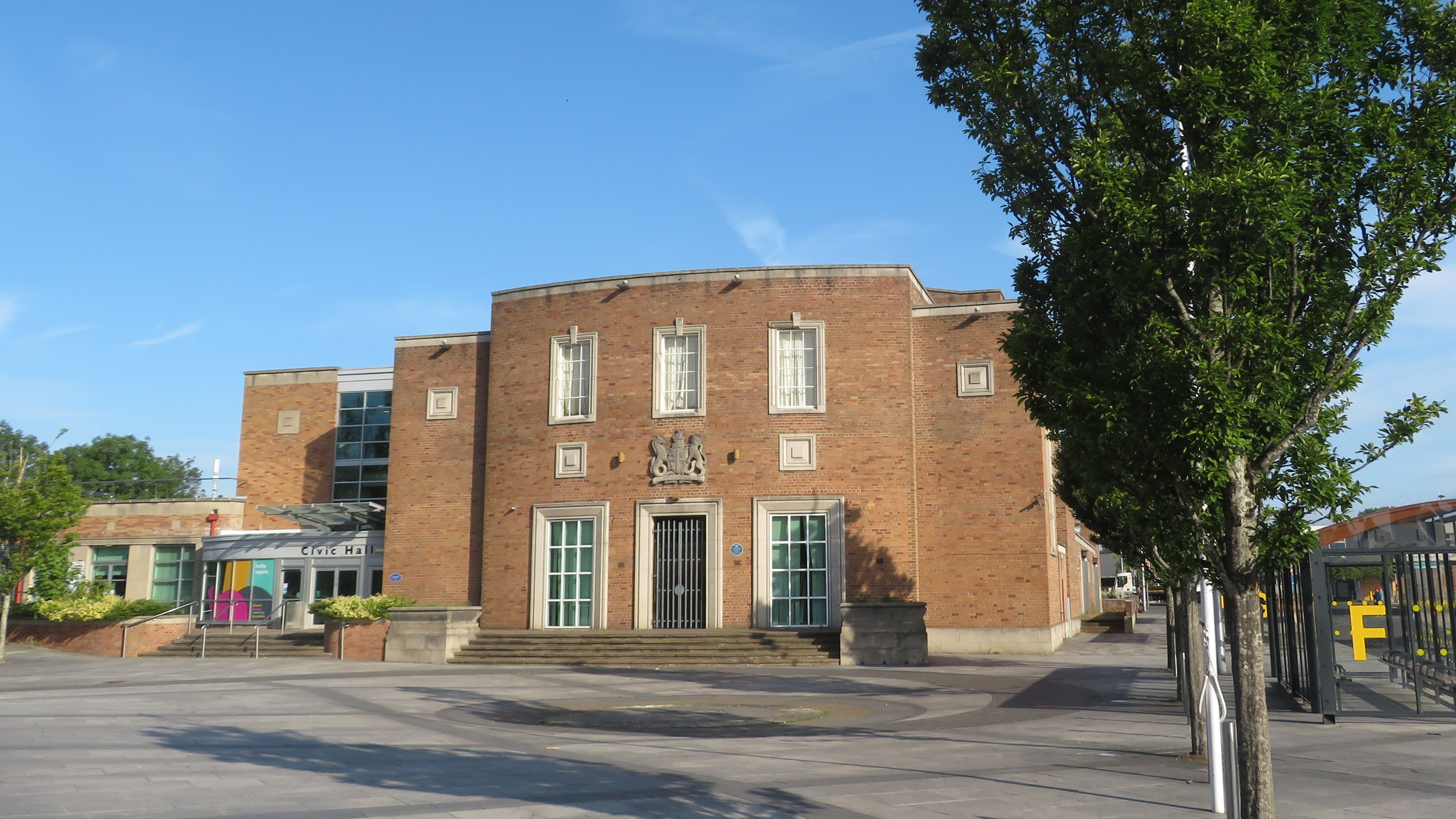
- Ellesmere Port Civic Hall

- Location within Cheshire
- Population: 65,430 (Built up area, 2021)
- OS grid reference: SJ4175
  - London: 170 mi (270 km) SE
- Unitary authority: Cheshire West and Chester
- Ceremonial county: Cheshire
- Region: North West
- Country: England
- Sovereign state: United Kingdom
- Post town: ELLESMERE PORT
- Postcode district: CH65, CH66
- Dialling code: 0151
- Police: Cheshire
- Fire: Cheshire
- Ambulance: North West
- UK Parliament: Ellesmere Port and Bromborough

Ellesmere Port (/ˈɛlzmɪər/ ELZ-meer) is an industrial port town in the Cheshire West and Chester borough in Cheshire, England. Ellesmere Port is on the south-eastern edge of the Wirral Peninsula, six miles (ten kilometres) north of Chester, although not part of the Wirral administratively or Merseyside. It is on the bank of the Manchester Ship Canal. In the 2021 census, the built up area had a population of 65,430.

The town was originally established on the River Mersey at the entrance to the Ellesmere Canal. As well as a service sector economy, it has retained large industries including Stanlow oil refinery, a chemical works and the Vauxhall Motors car factory. There are also a number of tourist attractions including the National Waterways Museum, the Blue Planet Aquarium and Cheshire Oaks Designer Outlet.

== History ==
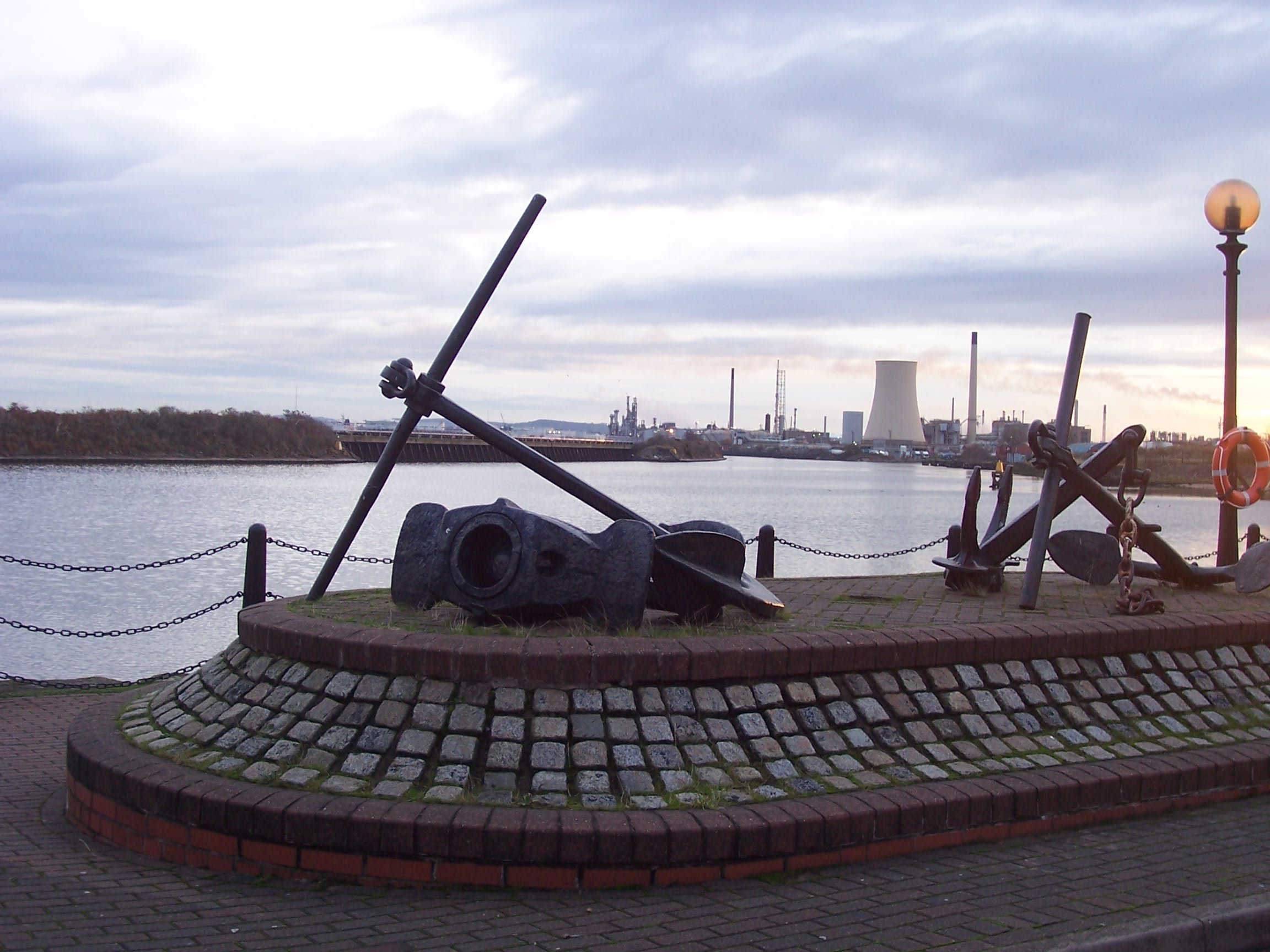
Ellesmere Port Dock at the Manchester Ship Canal looking towards the Stanlow Refinery

The town of Ellesmere Port was founded at the outlet of the never-completed Ellesmere Canal, named after the town of Ellesmere, Shropshire. The canal (now renamed) was designed and engineered by William Jessop and Thomas Telford as part of a project to connect the rivers Severn, Mersey and Dee. The canal was intended to be completed in sections. In 1795 the section between the River Mersey and the River Dee at Chester was opened. However the canal was not finished as first intended; it never reached the River Severn. Upon re-evaluation, it was decided that the costs to complete the project were not projected to be repaid because of a decrease in expected commercial traffic. There had been a loss of competitive advantage caused by steam engine-related economic advances (nationally, regionally and locally) during the first decade of the canal's construction.

The 1793 act authorising the canal's construction referred to its connection to the Mersey being "at or near Netherpool". In the event, the canal's northern end was not built in the township of Netherpool, but in the neighbouring township of Whitby to the east. The settlement which grew up at the canal basin was known both as 'Ellesmere Port' and 'Whitby Locks' at first.

Settlements had existed in the area since the writing of the Domesday Book in the 11th century, which mentions Great Sutton, Little Sutton, Pool (now Overpool) and Hooton.

The first houses in Ellesmere Port itself, however, grew up around the docks and the first main street was Dock Street, which now houses the National Waterways Museum. Station Road, which connected the docks with the village of Whitby, also gradually developed and as more shops were needed, some of the houses became retail premises. The main employer at this time was Burnell's Iron Works which had been set up at the end of the nineteenth century. This was followed by the setting up of the Mersey Ironworks factory by the Wolverhampton Corrugated Iron Company In 1905 who settled on Ellesmere Port as a way of exploiting the company's international trade through the nearby ports of Birkenhead and Liverpool. Initially 300 workers and their families came from Wolverhampton and the surrounding areas to work in the factory, settling in a specially built worker's village named "Wolverham". As the expanding industrial areas growing up around the canal and its docks attracted more workers to the area, the town itself continued to expand.

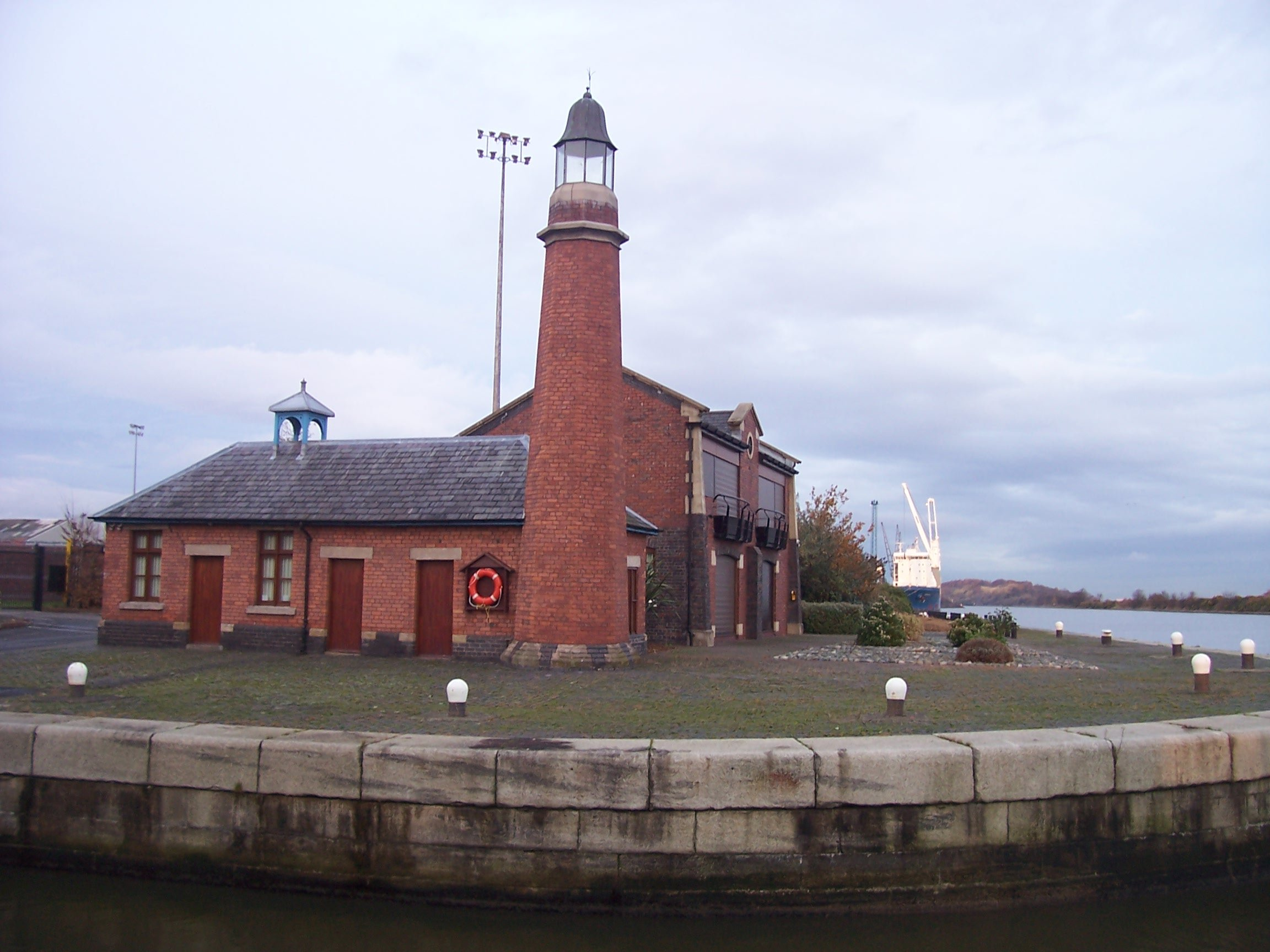
Whitby lighthouse

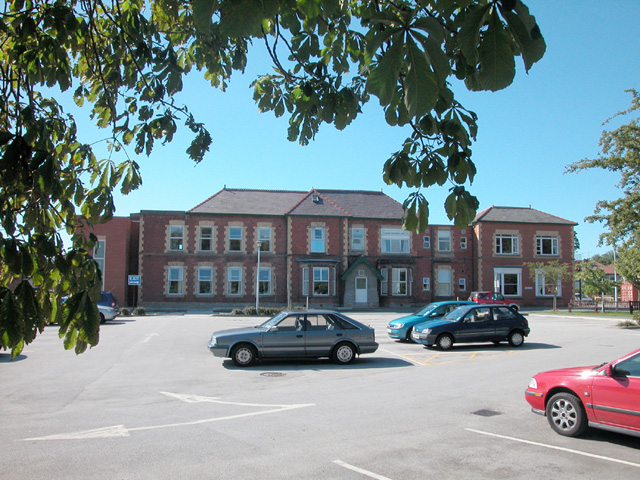
Ellesmere Port Hospital

By the mid-20th century, thanks to the opening of the Manchester Ship Canal in 1894 and the Stanlow Oil Refinery in the 1920s, Ellesmere Port had expanded so that it now incorporated the villages of Great and Little Sutton, Hooton, Whitby, Overpool and Rivacre as suburbs. The town centre itself had moved from the Station Road/Dock Street area, to an area that had once been home to a stud farm (indeed, the former Ellesmere Port and Neston Borough Council officially referred to the town centre as Stud Farm for housing allocation purposes) around the crossroads of Sutton Way/Stanney Lane and Whitby Road.

The foundation stone for Ellesmere Port Civic Hall was laid by the Chairman of Ellesmere Port Borough Council, Horace Black, on 2 May 1953. It was designed in the modernist style and completed in 1955. The Ellesmere Port Council Offices were constructed just to the southwest of the civic hall and completed in 1969.

In the 20th century, a number of new housing estates were developed, many of them on the sites of former farms such as Hope Farm and Grange Farm. Many estates consisted of both council housing and privately owned houses and flats.

Ellesmere Port, in more recent times has had an influx of immigrants from Liverpool. Thus demand for housing increased with the opening of the Vauxhall Motors car plant in 1962. Opened as a components supplier to the Luton plant, passenger car production began in 1964 with the Vauxhall Viva. The plant is now Vauxhall's only car factory in Britain, since the end of passenger car production at the Luton plant in 2004 (where commercial vehicles are still made). Ellesmere Port currently produces the Vauxhall Astra model on two shifts, employing 2,500 people.

In the mid-1980s, the Port Arcades, a covered shopping mall was built in the town centre. By the 1990s, it was the retail sector rather than the industrial that was attracting workers and their families to the town. This was boosted with the building of the Cheshire Oaks outlet village and the Coliseum shopping park, which also included a multiplex cinema; prior to this since the closure of the cinema in Station Road, Little Sutton (King's cinema) and the Queen's cinema adjacent to Ellesmere Port railway station in the 1960s the town's only cinema had been a single screen in the EPIC Leisure Centre.

In August 2012, Marks & Spencer opened their largest store (apart from Marble Arch in London) on a site near the Coliseum shopping park.

== Governance ==
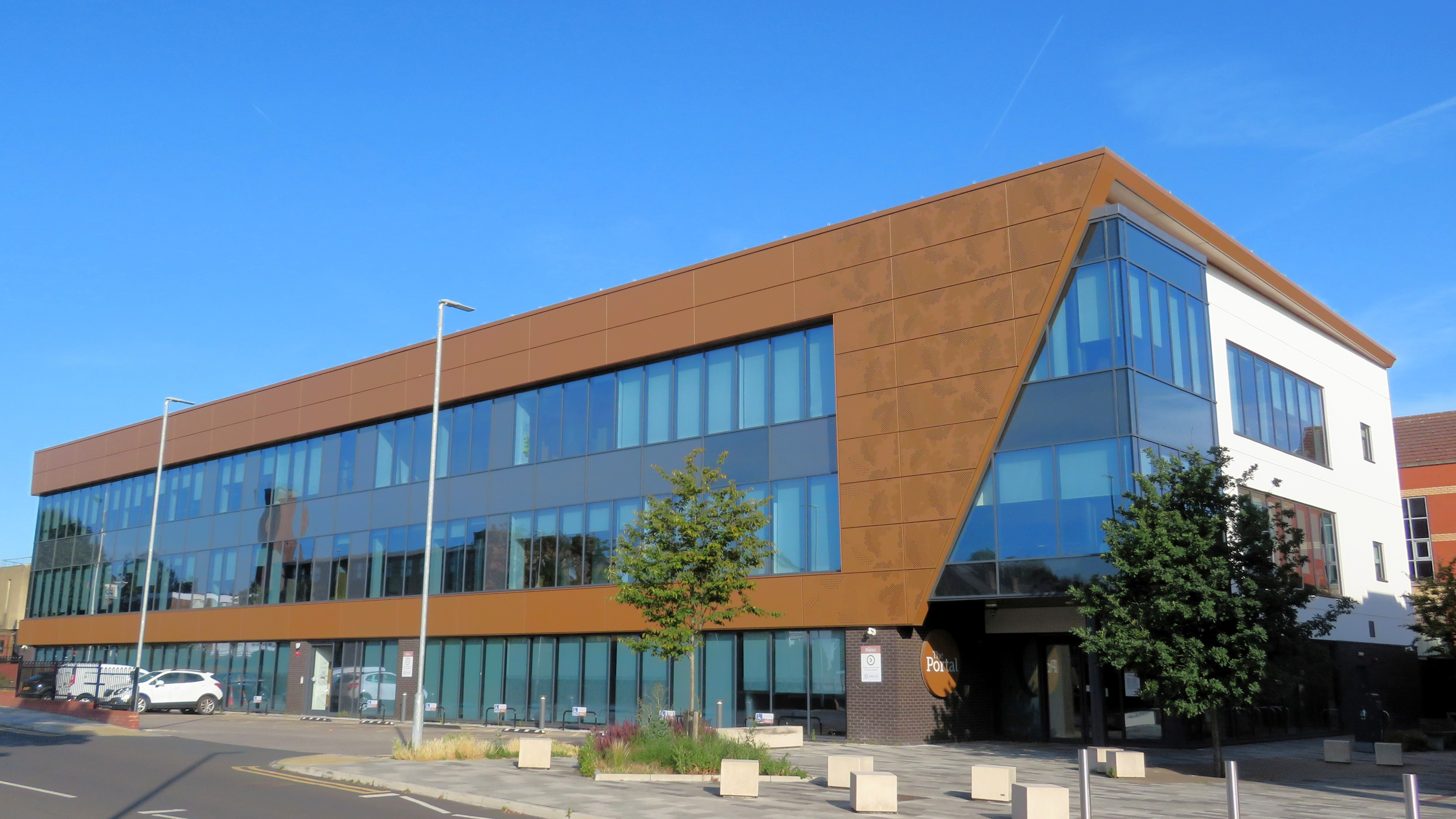
The Portal, Wellington Road: Main offices of Cheshire West and Chester Council

There is one main tier of local government covering Ellesmere Port, at unitary authority level, being Cheshire West and Chester Council. Most of the Ellesmere Port built up area is unparished, with the exception of the civil parish of Little Stanney on the south-eastern edge of the urban area. Cheshire West and Chester Council has its main offices in the town, at the Portal on Wellington Road.

=== Parliamentary representation ===
At national level, Ellesmere Port is part of the Ellesmere Port and Bromborough constituency. As of 2025, the constituency is represented by Labour Member of Parliament (MP) Justin Madders.

=== Administrative history ===
The site where Ellesmere Port was developed from the 1790s onwards lay within the township of Whitby. The township was mostly in the ancient parish of Eastham but partly in the parish of Stoke (now called Stoak). Both parishes formed part of the Wirral Hundred of Cheshire. Whitby village lay about 1 mile (1.6 km) inland from the port, close to where the modern town centre later developed. From the 17th century onwards, parishes were gradually given various civil functions under the poor laws, in addition to their original ecclesiastical functions. In some cases, including Whitby, the civil functions were exercised by each township separately rather than the parishes as a whole. In 1866, the legal definition of 'parish' was changed to be the areas used for administering the poor laws, and so Whitby became a civil parish.

The parish of Whitby was converted into an urban district called Ellesmere Port and Whitby in 1902. The urban district was enlarged in 1910 to absorb the parishes of Netherpool, Overpool, Great Stanney, and Stanlow. In 1911, the civil parishes within the urban district were reorganised into two urban parishes: Ellesmere Port (covering the area of the abolished parishes of Netherpool, Overpool and Whitby), and Great Stanney, which absorbed the area of the abolished parish of Stanlow.

The urban district was enlarged again in 1933 to take in the parishes of Childer Thornton, Hooton, Ince, Great Sutton, and Little Sutton, with some adjustments to the boundaries with neighbouring parishes. The enlarged urban district was renamed from Ellesmere Port and Whitby to just Ellesmere Port at the same time. The parish of Ellesmere Port was enlarged to cover the whole urban district in 1950, and in 1955 the urban district was raised to the status of a municipal borough.

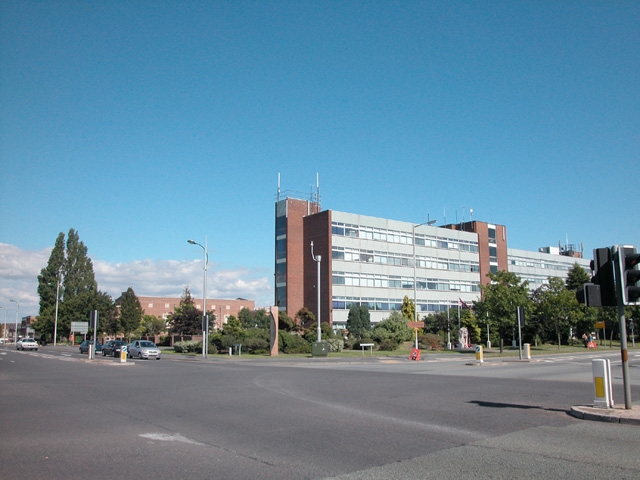
Former Ellesmere Port Council Offices, demolished in 2025

The borough of Ellesmere Port was abolished in 1974 under the Local Government Act 1972. The area had been considered for inclusion in the new county of Merseyside, but it was decided instead to leave it in Cheshire as part of the new borough of Ellesmere Port and Neston. Ellesmere Port was the largest town in the new borough, and was where the new borough council established its headquarters, using the former borough council's offices on Civic Way as its headquarters.

Ellesmere Port and Neston Borough Council was abolished in 2009, when local government across Cheshire was reorganised; Cheshire County Council was also abolished, and the three districts of Chester, Ellesmere Port and Neston, and Vale Royal merged to become Cheshire West and Chester. The Cheshire West and Chester councillors representing the wards which cover Ellesmere Port act as charter trustees to preserve the town's civic traditions, including choosing one of their number to serve as the town's mayor.

== Demography ==
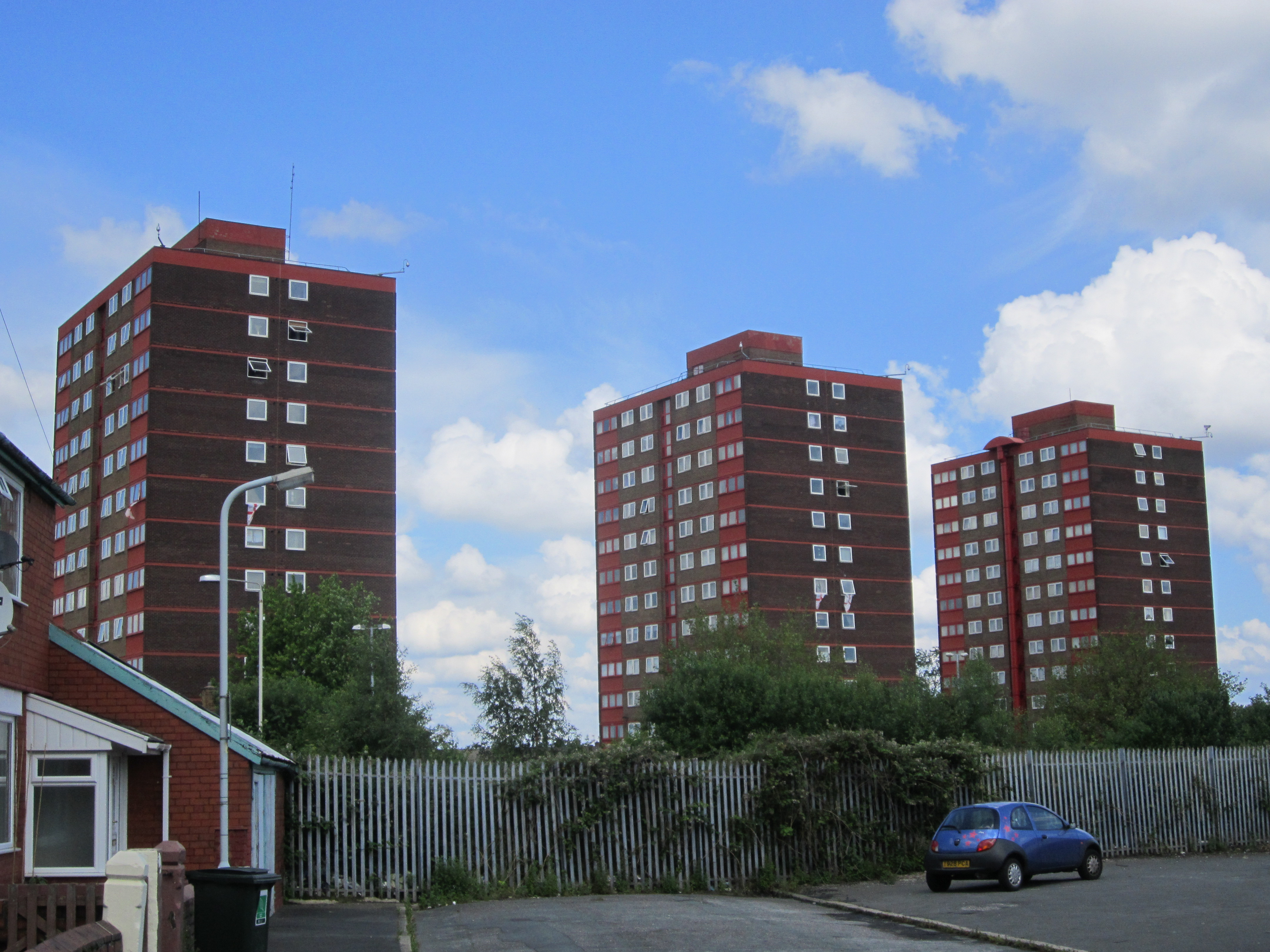
Joseph Groome Apartment blocks

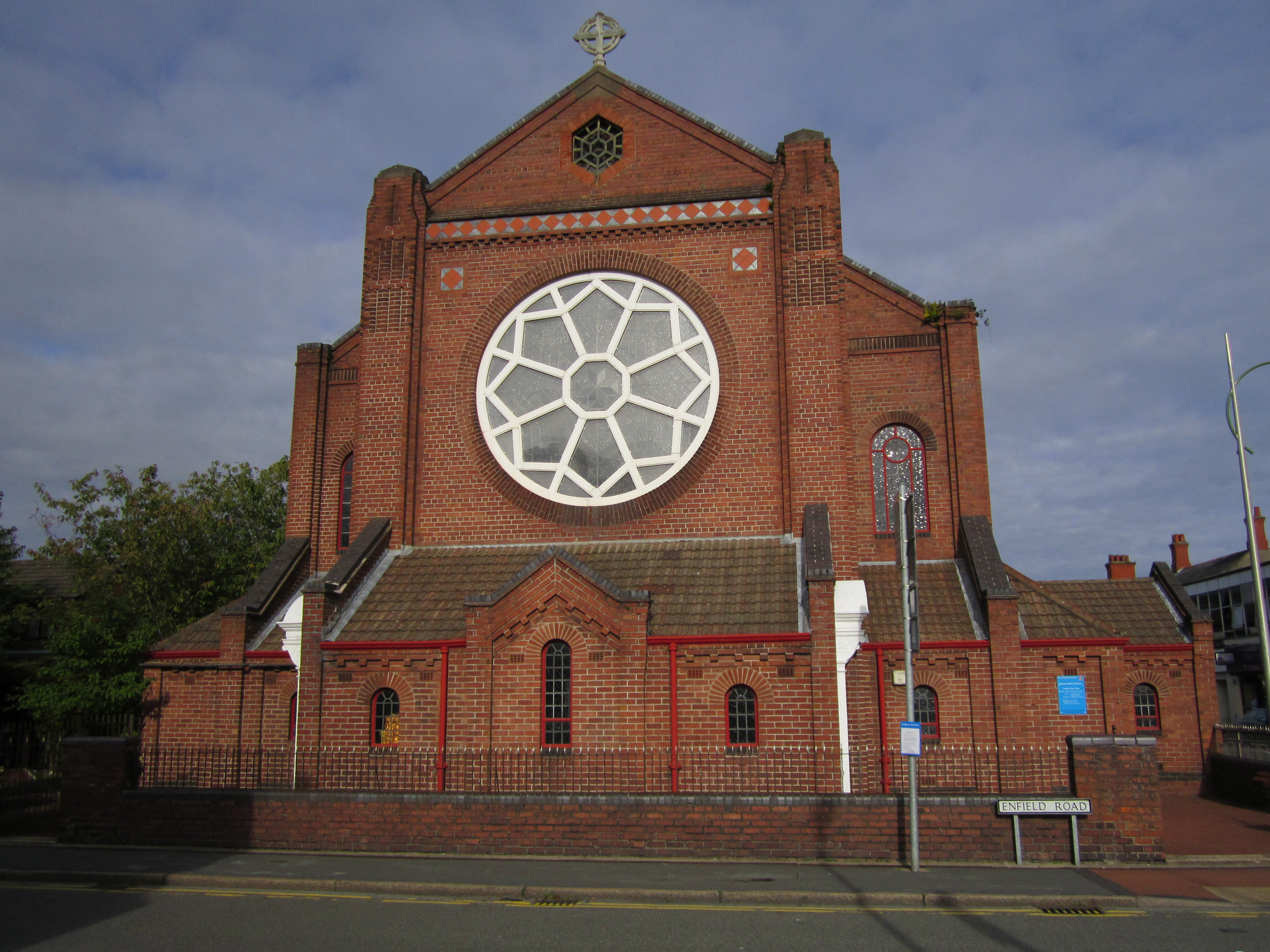
Our Lady Star of the Sea Catholic Church

Population since 1901
Year	Population
1901	10,366
1911	10,253
1921	12,891
1931	18,267
1951	32,653
1961	44,681
1971	61,637
1981	63,315
1991	31,378
2001	64,100
2011	61,090

The 2011 census records 27,134 households in Ellesmere Port, with 40.9% of the population aged between 30 and 59. It lists the ethnicity of the town as 95.2% White British, 0.8% White Irish, 1.6% White Other, 0.8% mixed ethnicity, 1.1% Asian, 0.2% Black and 0.1% other. 97.8% speak English as a first language.

== Religion ==
According to the 2011 census, the main religion of Ellesmere Port is Christianity with 72.1% of the population. 20% have no religion, 6% are unspecified, 0.4% are Muslim, 0.2% are Buddhist, 0.1% Hindu and 0.2% other.

== Landmarks ==
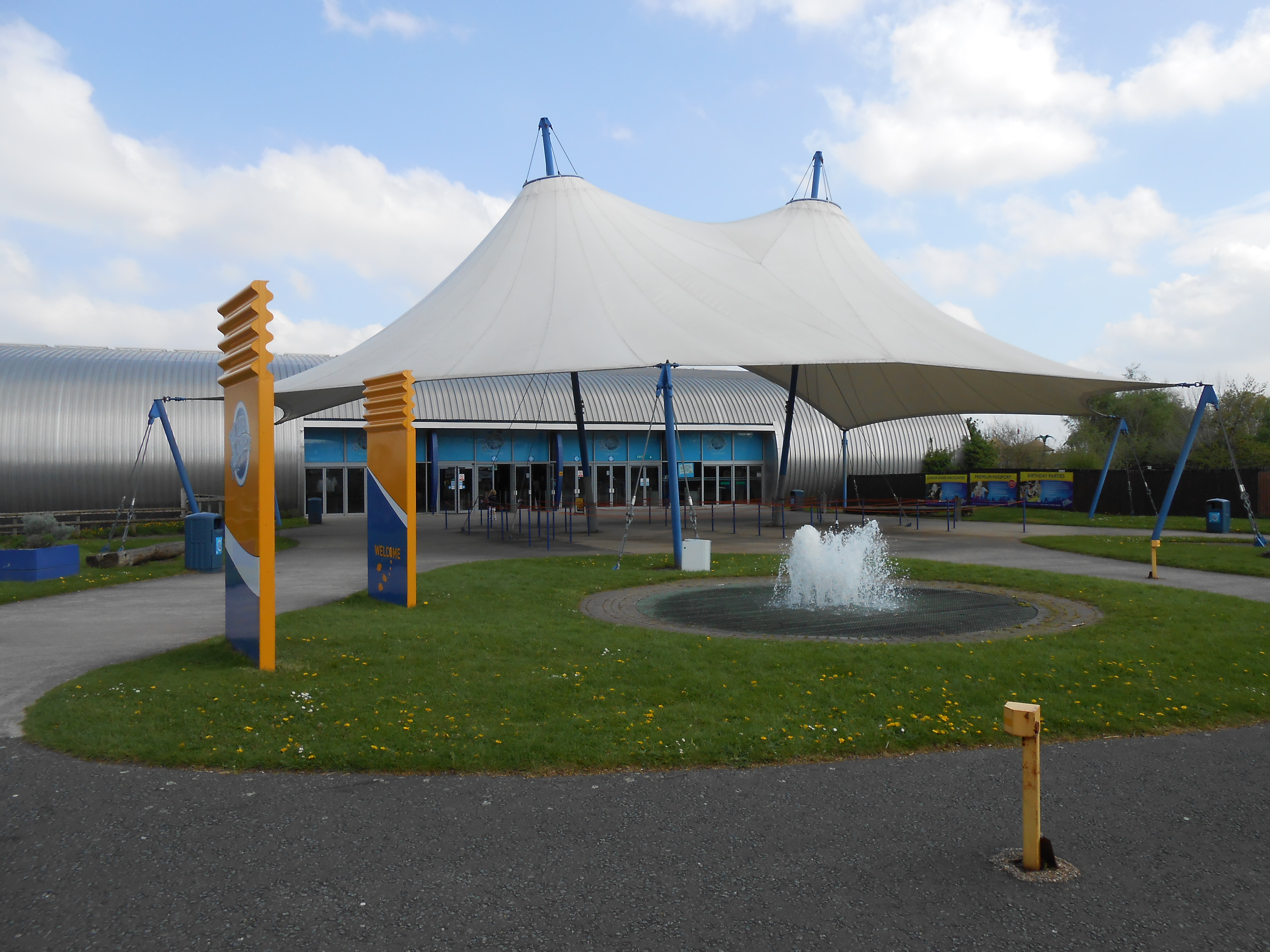
Blue Planet Aquarium

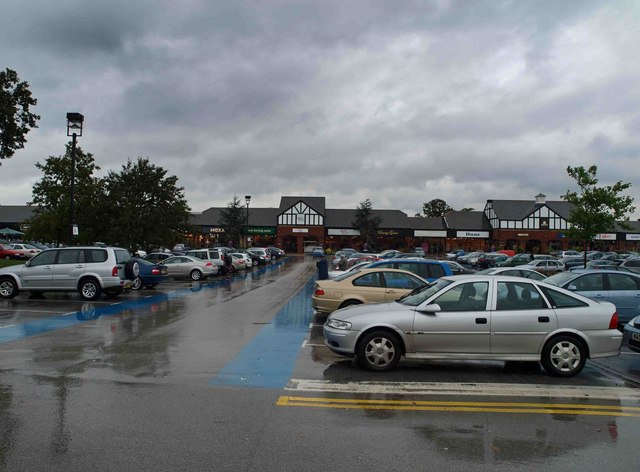
Cheshire Oaks shopping centre

- Blue Planet Aquarium, largest aquarium in the UK 1998–1999
- Cheshire Oaks Designer Outlet, largest outlet village in the UK 1995–present, largest outlet village in Europe 1995–1998. It is the location of the UK's largest artificial Christmas tree, 90 feet (27 m) tall and 32 feet (9.8 m) wide
- The Coliseum Retail Park, retail outlet located next to Cheshire Oaks Outlet
- Ellesmere Port Hospital, located in Whitby
- Ellesmere Port Sports Village, a £15 million sports village opened in late 2015
- Marks & Spencer, second largest store in the UK
- National Waterways Museum, largest canal boat collection in the world
- Stanlow Oil Refinery, second largest industrial space in the UK
- Whitby Hall, listed Victorian building in Whitby Park and home of Theatre Porto, formerly Action Transport Theatre company

== Geography ==
Ellesmere Port is located at the southern end of the Wirral Peninsula, in the county of Cheshire. Its suburbs include Overpool to the north west, Westminster to the north, Rossmore to the north east, with Whitby and Wolverham to the south.

=== Parks and green spaces ===
- Whitby Park
- Rivacre Valley Local Nature Reserve
- Stanney Woods Nature Reserve

== Media ==
Local news and television programmes are provided by BBC North West and ITV Granada. Television signals are received from the Winter Hill TV transmitter. With its close proximity with North Wales, BBC Wales and ITV Cymru Wales can also be received from the Moel-y-Parc TV transmitter.

Local radio stations are BBC Radio Merseyside on 95.8 FM, Capital North West & Wales on 97.1 FM, Heart North West on 105.4 FM, Smooth Radio North West on 100.4 FM, and Dee Radio on 106.3 FM.

The town is served by the local newspaper, Chester and District Standard (formerly The Ellesmere Port Standard).

== Transport ==
=== Road ===
Ellesmere Port is located near the interchange of the M56 and the M53 motorways. The A41 road between Birkenhead and Chester, also passes through the area. The M56 carries the European Route E22 in this area.

=== Buses ===
There is a bus station in the town centre with frequent services to Chester, Liverpool, Runcorn, Elton, Helsby, Frodsham, Birkenhead and Neston. There are also services to Mold, North Wales operated by Stagecoach. Occasional National Express coaches serve the bus station. Most services are operated by Stagecoach Merseyside & South Lancashire with one service operated by Helms of Eastham and another by Arrowebrook Coaches.

=== Rail ===
Ellesmere Port railway station is on the Wirral line of the Merseyrail network and has a train service to Chester via Hooton and also Liverpool via Birkenhead. The line was electrified from Hooton to Ellesmere Port by British Rail in 1994. There is also an infrequent service to Warrington.

=== Canal ===
The Manchester Ship Canal joins the Mersey estuary north-west of Ellesmere Port at Eastham, but the town is also the northern terminus of the Shropshire Union Canal (which used to exchange goods with seagoing boats at what is now the National Waterways Museum).

== Sports ==
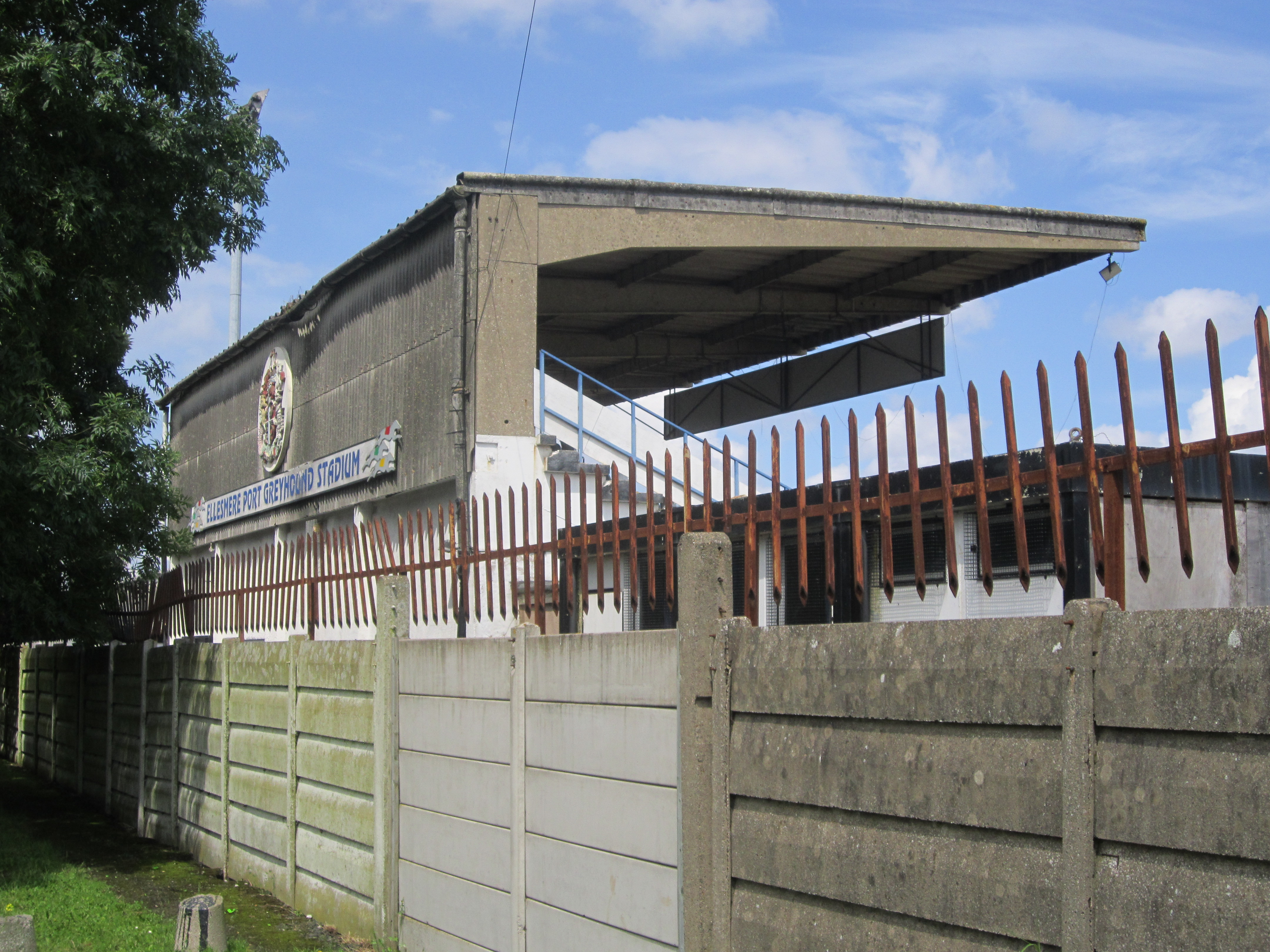
Ellesmere Port Greyhound Stadium

Speedway racing operated at Ellesmere Port Stadium in Thornton Road in the mid to late 1970s and in the 1980s; from March 2013 to spring 2014, the stadium was back in use for greyhound racing. Ellesmere Port Gunners raced in the lower tier Leagues. The Gunners' best season was their last, 1985, when they won the National League championship. The campaign was marred by a career-ending injury sustained by inspirational captain Joe Owen. Owen was hurt in a track crash at Birmingham. Ellesmere Port Town F.C. was once of town's main football team before the founding of Vauxhall Motors F.C. in 1963. Ellesmere Port Town F.C. was founded in 1948 and folded in 1973. The club's main achievements were playing in the Northern Premier League (The 7th tier in the English Football Pyramid) and reaching the F.A. Cup First Round in the 1971–1972 season, losing 3–0 to Boston United. Vauxhall Motors F.C. are the local football team.

In 2009 Eddie Izzard and his run around the UK for Sport Relief saw him pass through Little Sutton village centre and Hooton. The footage is only minutes long however.

In 2012 Ellesmere Port played host to the Paralympic Flame as part of the Paralympic Torch Relay celebrations. West Cheshire Colleges campus in Ellesmere Port was one of the drop off points for the flame as well as the EPIC leisure centre and the David Lloyd Leisure Centre. Events included sporting demonstrations and the parade of the Paralympic flame.

Construction began in January 2014 for the new multimillion-pound Sports Village in Stanney Grange which initially was to incorporate an Olympic sized swimming venue (now smaller), tennis courts, football pitches and other sport halls, and will be the new home of Cheshire Phoenix, the local professional British Basketball League team from the start of the 2015/16 BBL Championship season. The village is situated on site of the old Stanney High School by Cheshire Oaks, the Coliseum and M&S.

== Notable people ==
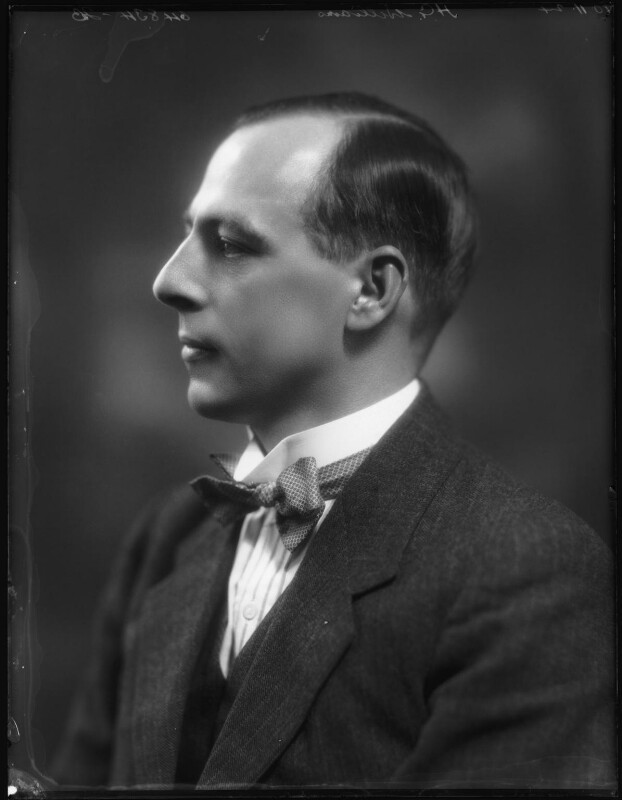
Sir Herbert Williams, 1st Baronet, 1924

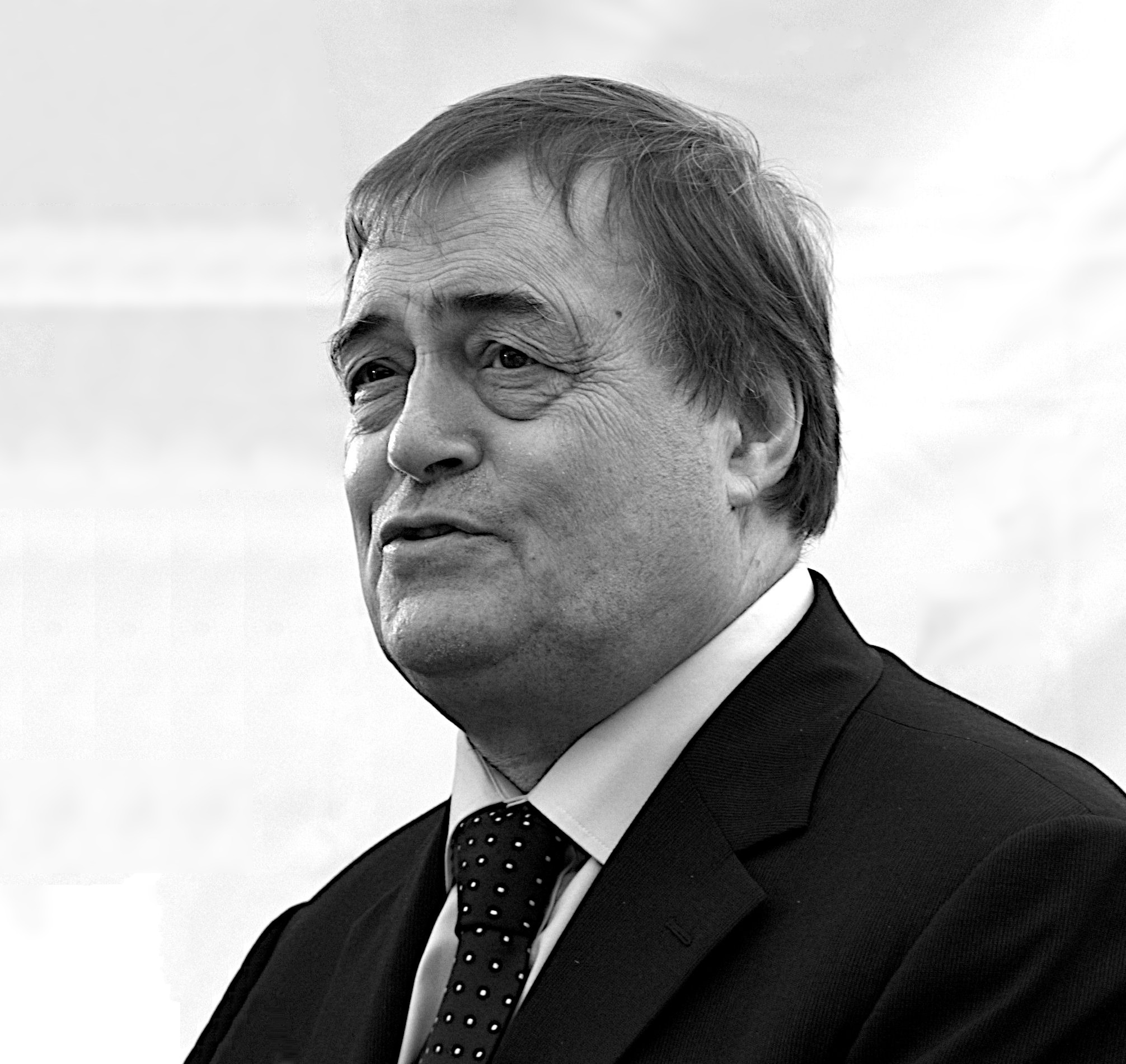
John Prescott, 2007

The following people are natives of Ellesmere Port, or have lived there for a period of time.

- Arthur Goddard (1921–2022) was in charge of the Land Rovers engineering development from 1947 to 1957, went to the Little Sutton Primary School
- Charles Bronson (born 1952) also known as Charles Salvador, is an English criminal and "most violent prisoner in Britain" lived in Ellesmere Port in his early teens

=== Politics ===
- Sir Herbert Williams, 1st Baronet (1884 in Hooton – 1954) Conservative MP for Reading 1924 to 1929, for Croydon South 1932 to 1945 and for Croydon East 1950 to 1954
- John Prescott, Baron Prescott (1938–2024) ex-Deputy Prime Minister attended the Grange Secondary Modern School in 1948.
- Tony Woodley, Baron Woodley (born 1948), was Joint-General Secretary of Unite, lives locally
- Andrew Miller (1949–2019) former Labour MP for Ellesmere Port and Neston from 1992 to 2015.
- Beverley Hughes, Baroness Hughes of Stretford (born 1950 in Ellesmere Port) Labour MP for Stretford and Urmston and former government minister

=== Creative arts ===
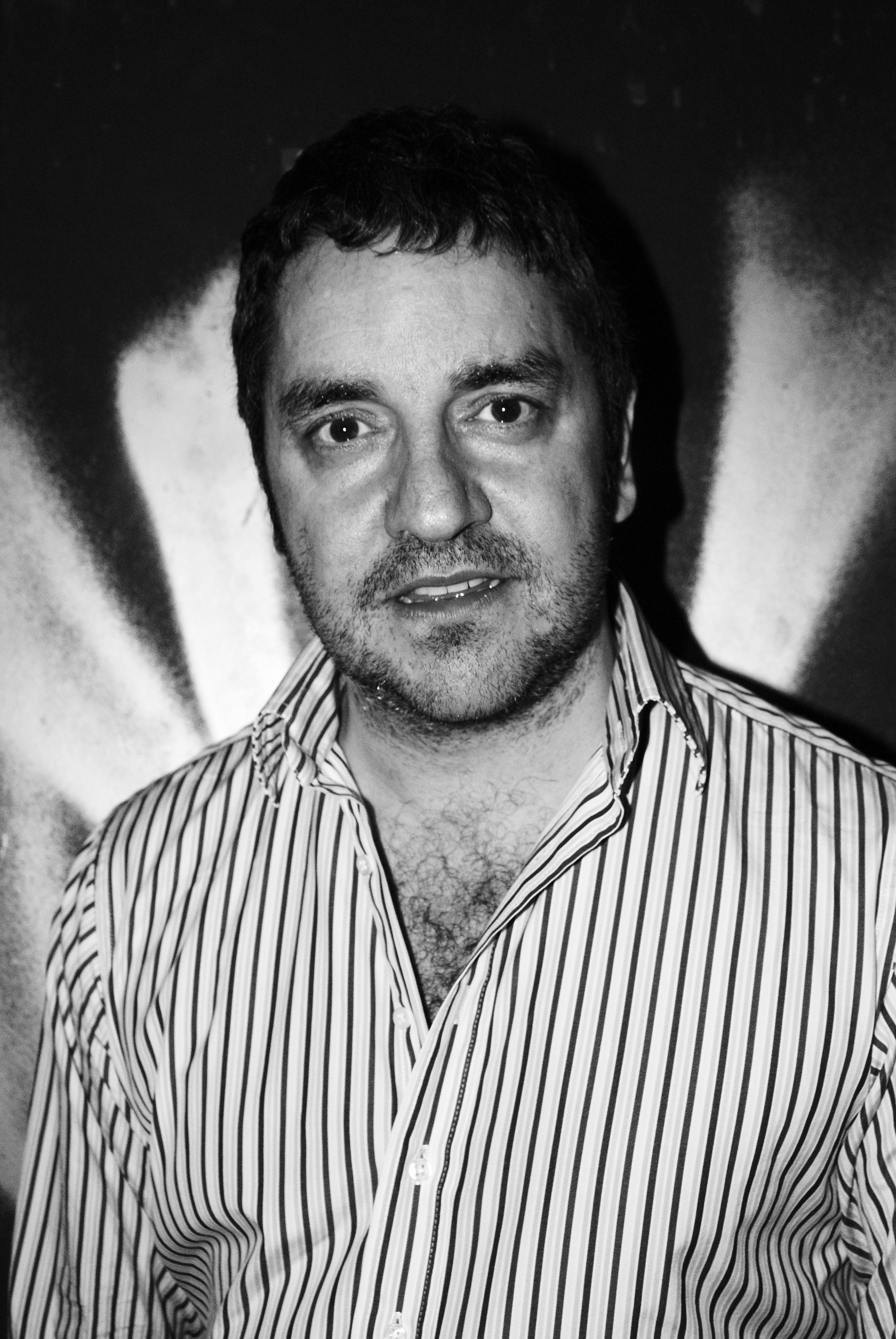
Ian Prowse, 2010

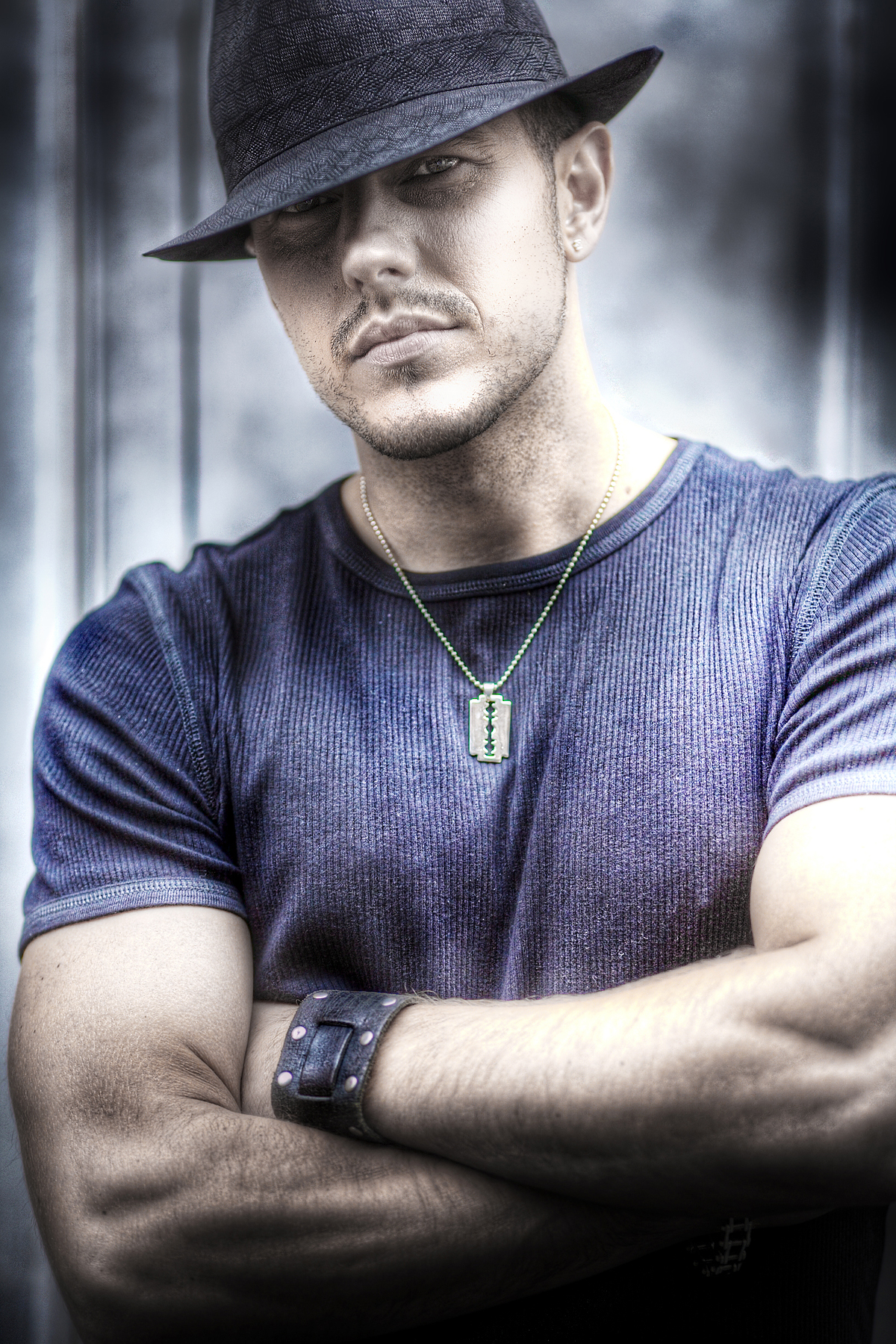
Lee Latchford-Evans, 2009

- Edgar Foxall (1906 in Ellesmere Port – 1990) was an English poet whose work features in one of the Penguin poetry anthologies, Poetry of the Thirties (1964).
- Lillian Beckwith (1916–2004) author, born and grew up in Ellesmere Port the daughter of a grocer as chronicled in her book About My Father's Business
- Russ Abbot (born 1947), musician, actor and comedian.
- Mike Singleton (1951–2012) an English teacher in Ellesmere Port, then a British video game designer
- Ian Prowse (born 1964) singer, songwriter formerly of Pele and Amsterdam grew up in Little Sutton
- Mark Leckey (born 1964), artist, makes items incorporating themes of nostalgia and anxiety, went to school locally
- Stevie Riks (born 1967 in Ellesmere Port) an English comedian and impressionist, comedy writer, voice-over artist and multi-instrumentalist musician.
- Stove King (born 1974 in Ellesmere Port) an English musician, formerly the bassist for the rock band Mansun
- Lee Latchford Evans (born 1975) an English singer, dancer, stage actor, kickboxer and personal trainer, member of pop group Steps grew up here.
- Joshua Leary (born 1989), electronic musician and hip-hop producer known by his stage name Evian Christ.
- Pele (active 1990 to 1996) were an English indie rock band, formed in Ellesmere Port
- Hooton Tennis Club (formed 2013) a four-piece indie-rock band including James Madden and Callum McFadden who grew up in the area.

=== Sport ===
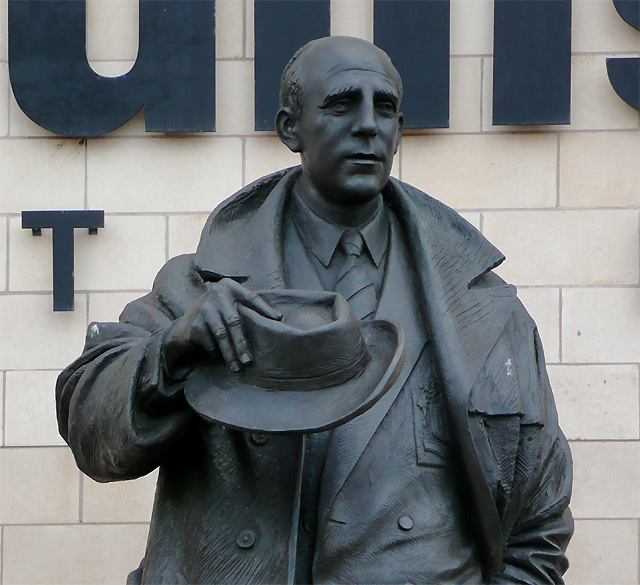
Stan Cullis, statue outside Molineux Stadium

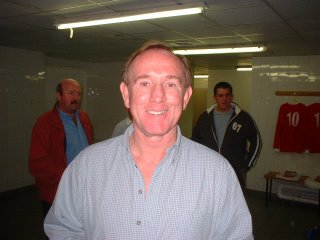
Ian Bowyer, 2009

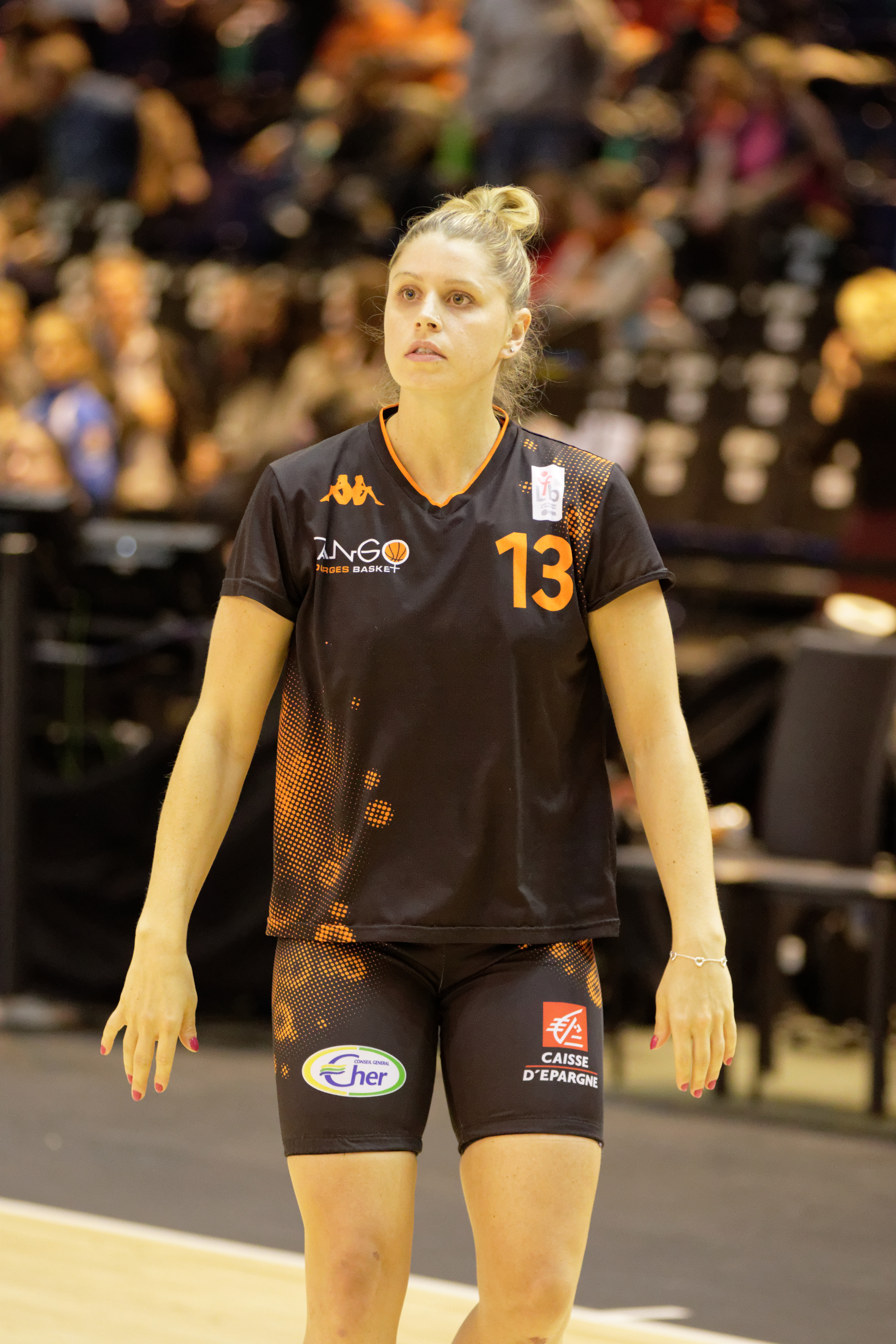
Johannah Leedham, 2015

- Sam Chedgzoy (1889 in Ellesmere Port – 1967) footballer, played 279 times for Everton between 1910/1926.
- Joe Mercer (1914 in Ellesmere Port – 1990) England football player and manager, led Manchester City as 1968 First Division champions, won the FA Cup (1969), League Cup (1970) and European Cup Winners' Cup (1970).
- Stan Cullis (1916 in Ellesmere Port – 2001) former Wolverhampton Wanderers player and manager, he played football for Cambridge Road School and Ellesmere Port Boys.
- Michael Ainsworth (1922 in Hooton – 1978) an English cricketer who played his county cricket for Worcestershire
- Sir Doug Ellis (1924–2018), business entrepreneur and Aston Villa chairman.
- Dave Hickson (1929–2013) footballer, played for Everton and Liverpool, and was ambassador for Everton
- Ralph Gubbins (1932 in Ellesmere Port – 2011) footballer who played 279 games
- Joe Mercer OBE (1934–2021) known as Smokin' Joe, a race horse jockey, rode 2,810 winners
- Brian Maxine (1938–2024), known as Goldbelt, a professional wrestler and cabaret artist
- Tony Coleman (born 1945 in Ellesmere Port) an English former footballer who made 250 pro appearances
- Mick Wright (born 1946 in Ellesmere Port) former footballer, played 282 games for Aston Villa
- Geoff Davies (born 1947 in Ellesmere Port) former footballer, played 305 pro games
- Graham Turner (born 1947 in Ellesmere Port) is former Shrewsbury Town and Wolves manager
- Ian Bowyer (born 1951 in Little Sutton) footballer, played 628 games, mainly for Nottingham Forest
- Paul Jones (born 1953 in Ellesmere Port) footballer played 626 games including 445 for Bolton Wanderers
- Barry Siddall (born 1954 in Ellesmere Port) former football goalkeeper, played 640 games
- Neil Whatmore (born 1955 in Ellesmere Port) footballer played 440 games including 277 for Bolton Wanderers
- Colin Woodthorpe (born 1969) footballer, grew up and went to school locally, played 693 games.
- Rob Jones (born 1971) former footballer played 260 games, mainly for Liverpool, grew up in the town.
- Phil Hardy (born 1973), footballer who played 349 games for Wrexham A.F.C.
- Chris McCready (born 1981 in Ellesmere Port), former footballer who played 327 games
- Tony Martin (born 1981 in Ellesmere Port) Professional darts player and Team GB soft tips darts captain.
- Anastasia Dobromyslova (born 1984) former Women's World Professional Darts Champion, lives in the town.
- Johannah Leedham (born 1987 in Ellesmere Port) Team GB women's basketball captain for London 2012
- Paul Butler (born 1988 in Ellesmere Port) an English professional Bantamweight boxer and a former IBF Bantamweight champion

== See also ==
- Listed buildings in Ellesmere Port
- Ellesmere Port and Neston (UK Parliament constituency)
