= Chrimes =

Chrimes is a surname. Notable people with the surname include:

- Reg Chrimes (1924–2021), British politician
- Stanley Bertram Chrimes (1907–1984), British university department head
- Rosemary Chrimes, one of the names of Rosemary Payne (1993–), British female discus thrower
