= 1999 Ellesmere Port and Neston Borough Council election =

1999 UK local government election

Elections to Ellesmere Port and Neston Borough Council were held on 6 May 1999. The whole council was up for election with boundary changes since the last election in 1998 increasing the number of seats by 3. The Labour Party stayed in overall control of the council.

== Results ==
Ellesmere Port and Neston local election result 1999
Party	Seats	Gains	Losses	Net gain/loss	Seats %	Votes %	Votes	+/−
Labour	38			+2	86.4			
Conservative	5			0	11.4			
Liberal Democrats	1			+1	2.3			
