= Ellesmere Port Council Offices =

Municipal building in Ellesmere Port, Cheshire, England

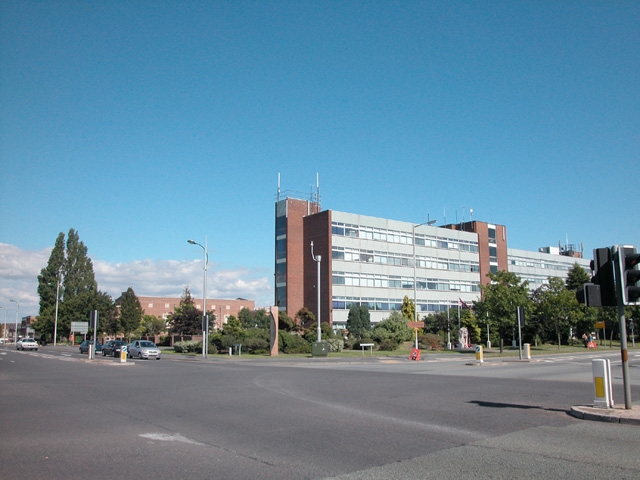
- The building in 2005

- Shown in Cheshire
- 53.2768°N 2.9041°W
- Location: Civic Way, Ellesmere Port

History
- Built: 1969

Site notes
- Architectural style: Modern style

Ellesmere Port Council Offices is a municipal building in Civic Way in Ellesmere Port, a town in Cheshire, in England. The building served as the headquarters of Ellesmere Port and Neston Borough Council but is now disused.

== History ==
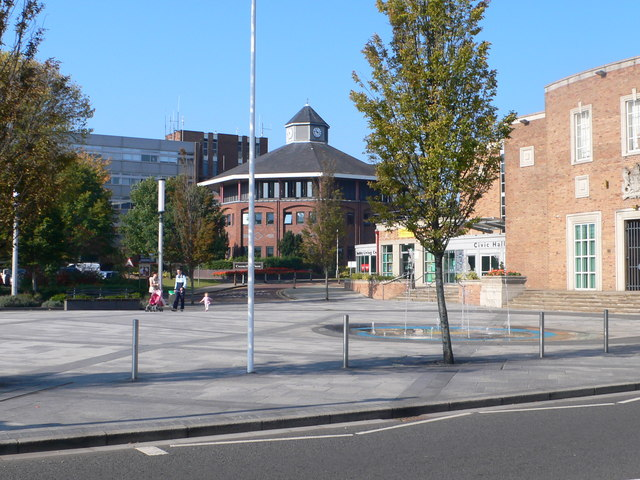
The 1990s extension (centre)

Ellesmere Port historically formed part of the township of Whitby, which was administered as a rural parish until 1902, forming part of the Wirral rural sanitary district from 1872 to 1894 and then the Wirral Rural District from 1894 to 1902. Following significant population growth, largely associated with the shipping industry, the township of Whitby was converted into an urban district called Ellesmere Port and Whitby in 1902.

The new urban district council initially established offices at Bank Buildings in Station Street, before opening dedicated offices in 1908. The council then moved to the former home of the Grace family, Whitby Hall, in 1931.

After the Second World War, a memorial, in the form of an irregular monolith of stone bearing by a plaque commemorating the lives of veterans involved in the Normandy landings, was unveiled to the west of the council offices at the corner of Stanney Lane and Whitby Road.

The Ellesmere Port and Whitby Urban District was enlarged in 1910 and again in 1933, when it was renamed the Ellesmere Port Urban District. It was raised to the status of a municipal borough in 1955. In that context, the council found that the Whitby Hall was inadequate and decided to commission a new civic complex. The site they selected was open land on the north side of Stanney Lane. The council offices were the final phase of the development of the new civic complex in the new town centre, following the opening of the Civic Hall in 1955, and a library in 1962. The new five-storey building was designed under the supervision of the borough engineer and surveyor, Howard Wilson, in the modern style, built in concrete, glass and brick and was completed in 1969. The main frontage was faced with alternating bands of concrete cladding and steel-framed glass and there were brick-clad staircase towers at centre and ends of the structure.

The building continued to serve as the local administrative headquarters after the area became part of the new Borough of Ellesmere Port and Neston in 1974. However, council meetings continued to be held at Whitby Hall until the early 1990s, when the council offices were extended. The additions including a new hexagonal shaped structure, containing a purpose-built council chamber, and an underground bunker, intended for use in the event of a nuclear attack. In 2009, the borough became part of Cheshire West and Chester.

In 2005, a new civic square was established to the east of the council offices. The centrepiece of the civic square was a new war memorial, in the form of a celtic cross on a cruciform base commemorating the lives of all local service personnel who had died in military conflict, which was unveiled on 11 November 2005.

The new council continued to use the building to deliver services until May 2022, when it moved to a new building in the town, The Portal. Demolition of the building was approved, but was delayed until 2024 due to the need to relocate mobile phone masts from the roof.
