= Pele (English band) =

English indie rock band

- Origin: Ellesmere Port, Cheshire, England
- Genres: Indie rock
- Years active: 1990–1996
- Label: M&G Records
- Past members: Ian Prowse; Andrew Roberts; Eddie Hayes

Pele were an English indie rock band, formed in Ellesmere Port, Cheshire, England in 1990, by the guitarist and frontman Ian Prowse and keyboard player Andrew Roberts. They were joined by Dally on drums, Jimmy McAllister on bass guitar and finally Nico on violin. Despite never reaching the Top 40 of the UK Singles Chart, the band built up a loyal live following, but split in 1995 due to a legal wrangle with their record label.

== Biography ==
After gigging around Chester and Liverpool, the band were signed to Polygram-backed label M&G Records, after their head of A&R heard a demo of "Megalomania". Within weeks the band set about recording their debut album, Fireworks, at the Metropolis recording studios in London, with record producer, Gary Langan.

As the album took shape, "Raid the Palace" was released as the first single. In the week after release, Pele began a tour at Kingston University, which culminated at the University of Wales in 1995, and included gigs across Europe. In February 1992, their second single, "Megalomania", was released, but failed to reach the Top 40 of the UK Singles Chart. The single also hit No. 1 in South Africa as well as charting in Portugal. The third single from the album was "Fair Blows the Wind for France", which also failed to hit the Top 40.

Tours with Del Amitri and The Pogues followed, before the band used the Rockfield Studios in Wales to record the follow-up album with producer Jon Kelly. "Fat Black Heart" was the band's first single off that album, and again, failed to break the UK Top 40. "Don't Worship Me" was Pele's sixth single and became a hit in the Netherlands and Germany: it was followed in early December by the Sport of Kings album.

The situation between the band and their record label deteriorated. Despite the live album, A-Live A-Live-O, legal threats and the record label's ultimate bankruptcy, led to the band splitting up. Prowse formed Amsterdam, who released their debut album in 2005 and reached the UK Singles Chart in the same year with their song "The Journey".

In July and August 2009, Pele played two reunion gigs in Liverpool, and London, whilst a final reunion show at the Cavern Club took place in December 2009. Ian Prowse toured the Fireworks album as part of a 25th anniversary re-release. A 25th anniversary of Sport Of Kings album was announced for early 2018.

28 years after originally being recorded, Pele's third album, This Time Next year, was released on 10 March 2023.

== Discography ==
=== Albums ===
- Fireworks (April 1992)
- Sport of Kings (December 1993)
- A-Live A-Live O (June 1994)
- This Time Next Year - Bootleg Version (December 2001)
- This Time Next Year - Release Version (February 2023)

=== Singles ===
- "Raid the Palace" (October 1991)
- "Megalomania" (February 1992) - UK No. 73
- "Fair Blows the Wind for France" (June 1992) - UK No. 62
- "Fireworks" (September 1992)
- "Fat Black Heart" (July 1993) - UK No. 75
- "Don't Worship Me" (November 1993)
