= Childer Thornton =

Village in Cheshire, England

Coordinates: 53.292°N 2.949°W

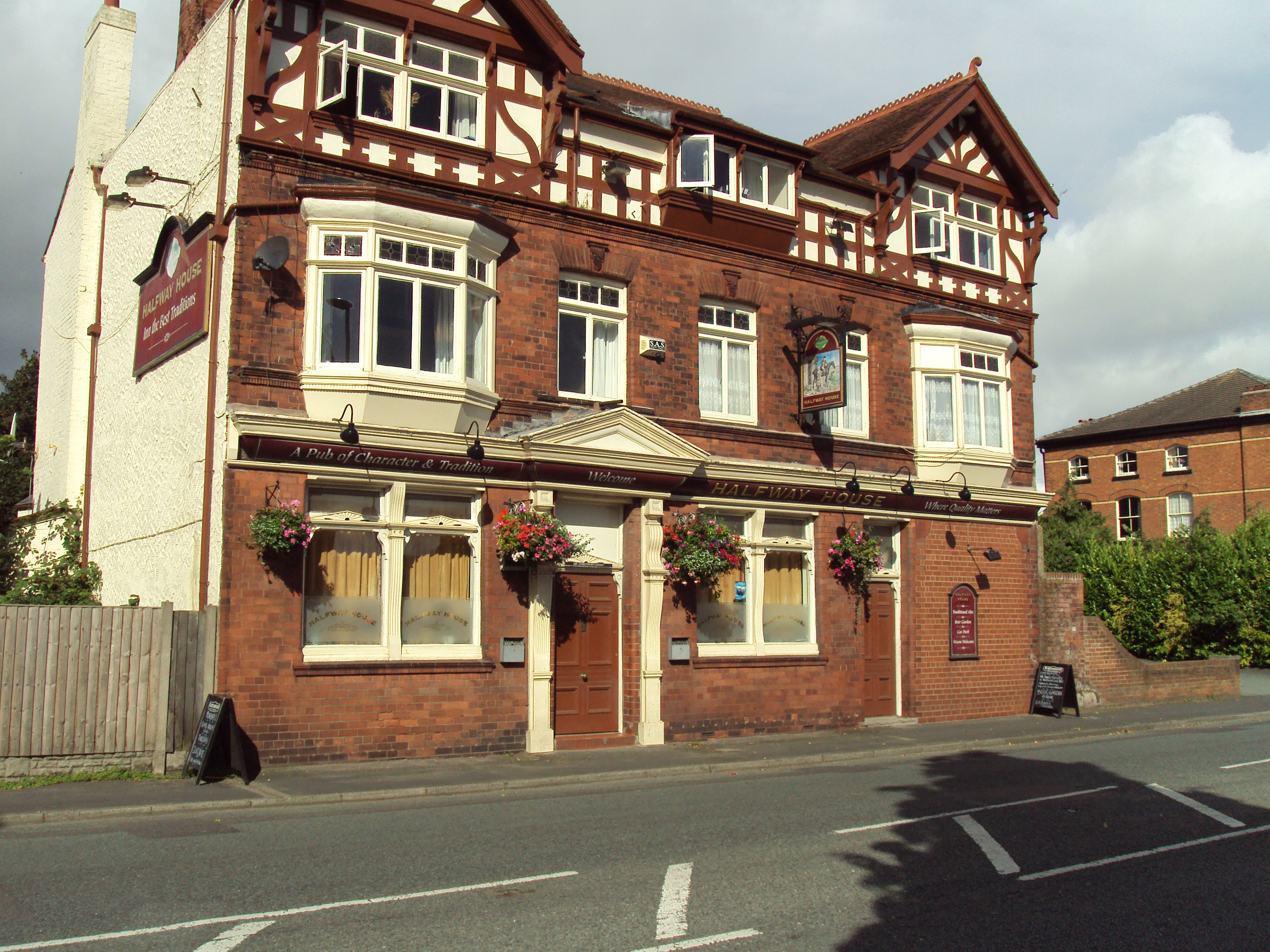
- The Halfway House pub on the A41 road

- Location within Cheshire
- OS grid reference: SJ368776
- Unitary authority: Cheshire West and Chester
- Ceremonial county: Cheshire
- Region: North West
- Country: England
- Sovereign state: United Kingdom
- Post town: ELLESMERE PORT
- Postcode district: CH66
- Dialling code: 0151
- Police: Cheshire
- Fire: Cheshire
- Ambulance: North West
- UK Parliament: Chester North and Neston

Childer Thornton is a village on the Wirral Peninsula, in the unitary authority Cheshire West and Chester and the ceremonial county of Cheshire, England. It was once a separate village but has since been incorporated into Ellesmere Port. Childer Thornton is on the A41 trunk road, between Hooton and Little Sutton.

== History ==
The name Childer Thornton means "children's thorn-tree farm/settlement" and likely derives from the Old English words cild (children), þorn (hawthorn tree) and tūn (a farmstead or settlement).

Although not specifically mentioned in the Domesday Book of 1086, it constituted a portion of the land owned by St Werburgh's Abbey in Chester.

Thornton-Childer was formerly a township in the parish of Eastham, in the Wirral Hundred, in 1866 Childer Thornton became a separate civil parish. It was administered as part of Wirral Rural District until 1933 when it was transferred to Ellesmere Port Urban District. On 1 April 1950 the parish was abolished and merged with Ellesmere Port. The population was 112 in 1801, 319 in 1851 and rising to 685 by 1901. In 1931 the parish had a population of 792. From 1974 to 2009 it was in Ellesmere Port and Neston district.

== Geography ==
Childer Thornton is in the southern part of the Wirral Peninsula, near to the town of Ellesmere Port.

== Community and Economy ==
The village has one school, two pubs, a hotel and a garden centre. Childer Thornton is exactly halfway in distance between Birkenhead and Chester and one of the pubs is named 'The Halfway House', which was a stagecoach stop between Chester and New Ferry in the 1770s. Childer Thornton's other pub is 'The White Lion'. The Village Petrol Station is equipped with a charging station for electric vehicles.

== Religion ==
Childer Thornton is in the Anglican parish of Hooton, with an attractive parish church made of local sandstone, situated just outside the village itself. St Paul's Church was built between 1858 and 1862, at a cost of £5,000. It was designated a Grade II* listed building in 1985.

== Transport ==
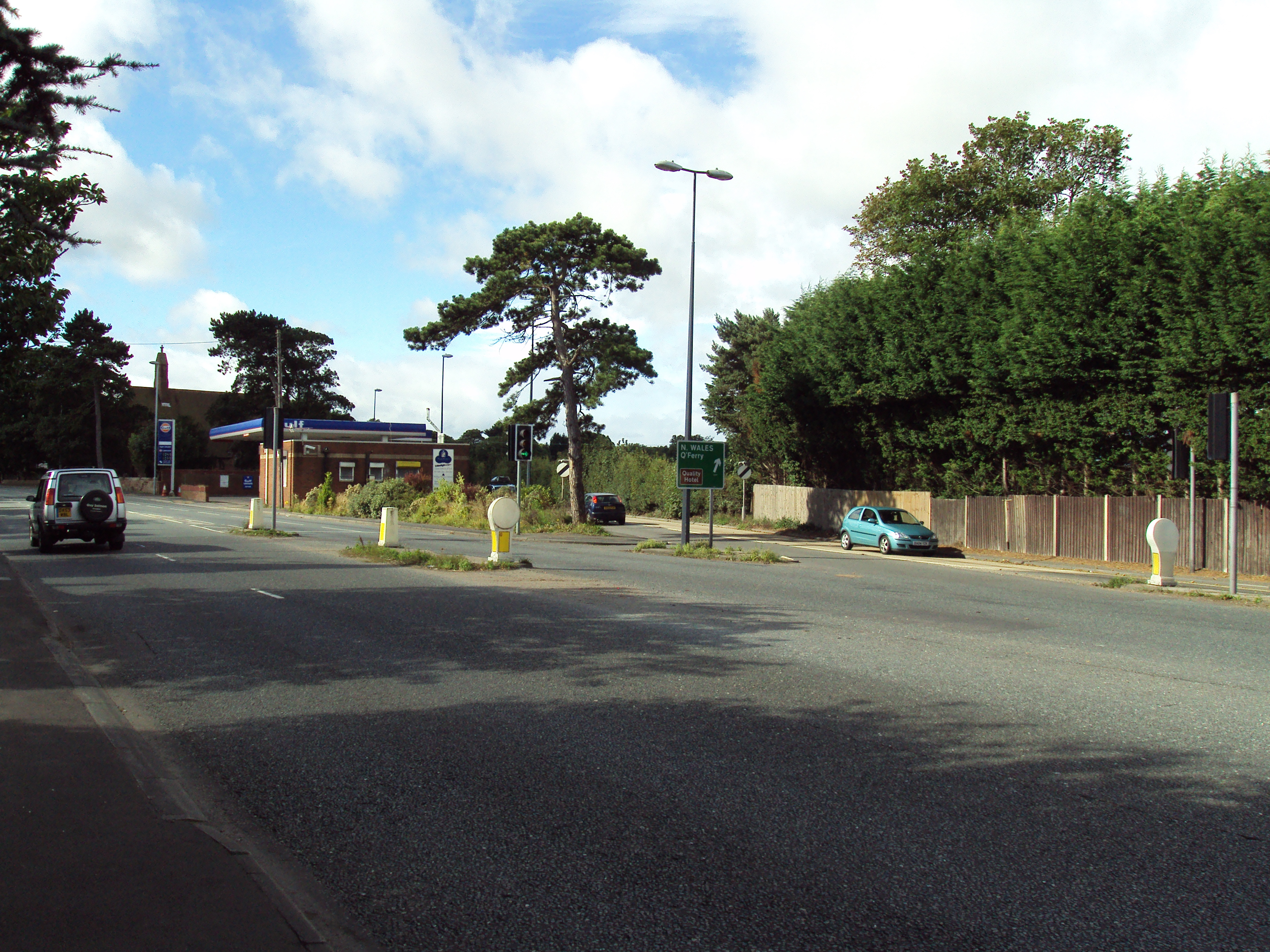
The junction of the A41 and A550 roads, to the north of Childer Thornton

The busy A41 road between Birkenhead and Chester runs through the middle of Childer Thornton. Despite this, the area is relatively unspoilt, with the M53 motorway effectively diverting away from the bulk of through traffic. To the north of the village, the A550 road diverges from the A41, heading towards North Wales.

The nearest railway station is Little Sutton, on the Wirral line of the Merseyrail network between Ellesmere Port and Liverpool.

The village is however served by frequent bus services (as of 2021):

Route No.	From	To	Via	Frequency
1	Liverpool	Chester	Birkenhead, Chester Zoo	Every 15 mins
X1	Liverpool	Chester	Birkenhead, Hope Farm	Every 10 mins
811	Moreton	Broughton	Birkenhead	Hourly
272	Arrowe Park	Ellesmere Port	Willaston	Hourly
359	Neston (Raby Park Road)	Ellesmere Port	Willaston (a.m.)/Ledsham Road (p.m.)	1 a.m. journey and 1 p.m. journey
