= 2003 Ellesmere Port and Neston Borough Council election =

2003 UK local government election

Results of the 2003 Ellesmere Port and Neston Borough Council election

Elections to Ellesmere Port and Neston Borough Council were held on 1 May 2003. One third of the council was up for election and the Labour Party stayed in overall control of the council.

After the election, the composition of the council was:

- Labour 31
- Conservative 10
- Liberal Democrat 2

== Results ==
Ellesmere Port and Neston local election result 2003
Party	Seats	Gains	Losses	Net gain/loss	Seats %	Votes %	Votes	+/−
Labour	12			-2	80.0	54.5	7,467	+5.5
Conservative	3			+2	20.0	31.7	4,346	-9.3
Liberal Democrats	0			0	0.0	12.7	1,744	+2.6
UKIP	0			0	0.0	1.1	149	New

== Ward results ==
Central
Party	Candidate	Votes	%	±%
Labour	Donald Davies	380	77.6	
Conservative	Anne Hughes	110	22.4	
Majority		270	55.2	
Turnout		490		

Grange (2)
Party	Candidate	Votes	%	±%
Labour	John Sherlock	535		
Labour	Barbara Shephard	530		
Conservative	Susan Thomas	150		
Turnout		1,215		

Groves
Party	Candidate	Votes	%	±%
Conservative	Brian Anderson	388	51.4	
Labour	Graham Stothard	278	36.8	
Liberal Democrats	Andrew Neal	89	11.8	
Majority		110	14.6	
Turnout		755		

Ledsham
Party	Candidate	Votes	%	±%
Conservative	Jonathan Starkey	647	45.5	+0.5
Labour	George Foster	521	36.6	−5.3
Liberal Democrats	Graham Handley	178	12.5	−0.6
UKIP	Geoffrey Gregory	76	5.3	+5.3
Majority		126	8.9	+5.8
Turnout		1,422		

Little Neston
Party	Candidate	Votes	%	±%
Labour	Reg Chrimes	630	56.5	
Conservative	Kay Loch	300	26.9	
Liberal Democrats	John Falconer	185	16.6	
Majority		330	29.6	
Turnout		1,115		

Neston
Party	Candidate	Votes	%	±%
Labour	Susan Davies	501	56.4	−5.5
Conservative	Peter Kevan	241	27.1	−1.9
Liberal Democrats	Michael Shipman	146	16.4	+7.3
Majority		260	29.3	−3.6
Turnout		888		

Parkgate
Party	Candidate	Votes	%	±%
Conservative	Brenda Dowdings	834	67.4	−3.7
Labour	David Rudd	331	26.7	−2.2
UKIP	Henry Crocker	73	5.9	+5.9
Majority		503	40.7	−1.5
Turnout		1,238		

Rivacre
Party	Candidate	Votes	%	±%
Labour	Angela Claydon	328	58.2	
Conservative	Terence Harvey	127	22.5	
Liberal Democrats	Mary Handley	109	19.3	
Majority		201	35.7	
Turnout		564		

Rossmore
Party	Candidate	Votes	%	±%
Labour	Ivor Jones	702	58.2	+2.7
Conservative	Geoffrey Thomas	282	23.4	−1.9
Liberal Democrats	Michael English	222	18.4	−0.9
Majority		420	34.8	+4.6
Turnout		1,206		

Stanlow and Wolverham
Party	Candidate	Votes	%	±%
Labour	Thomas Griffiths	429	54.6	−26.8
Liberal Democrats	Joan Brown	262	33.3	+33.3
Conservative	Henry Humpage	95	12.1	−6.7
Majority		167	11.3	−51.5
Turnout		786		

Strawberry Fields
Party	Candidate	Votes	%	±%
Labour	Sharon Hill	375	44.1	−3.7
Conservative	Karl Hardwick	289	34.0	−2.9
Liberal Democrats	Hilary Chrusciezl	186	21.9	+6.6
Majority		86	10.1	−0.8
Turnout		850		

Sutton
Party	Candidate	Votes	%	±%
Labour	Brian Jones	580	54.3	−2.4
Conservative	John Gordon	313	29.3	+0.0
Liberal Democrats	Joanna Pemberton	175	16.4	+2.4
Majority		267	25.0	−2.4
Turnout		1,068		

Westminster
Party	Candidate	Votes	%	±%
Labour	Frederick Venables	676	89.7	+8.8
Conservative	Thomas Hughes	78	10.3	−8.8
Majority		598	79.4	+17.6
Turnout		754		

Whitby
Party	Candidate	Votes	%	±%
Labour	Anthony Walsh	671	49.5	−2.7
Conservative	Janice Farquharson	492	36.3	−11.5
Liberal Democrats	Sally Martin	192	14.2	+14.2
Majority		279	13.2	+8.8
Turnout		1,355		
