= Little Sutton, Cheshire =

Village and suburb of Ellesmere Port, Cheshire, England

Coordinates: 53.285°N 2.94°W

Little Sutton
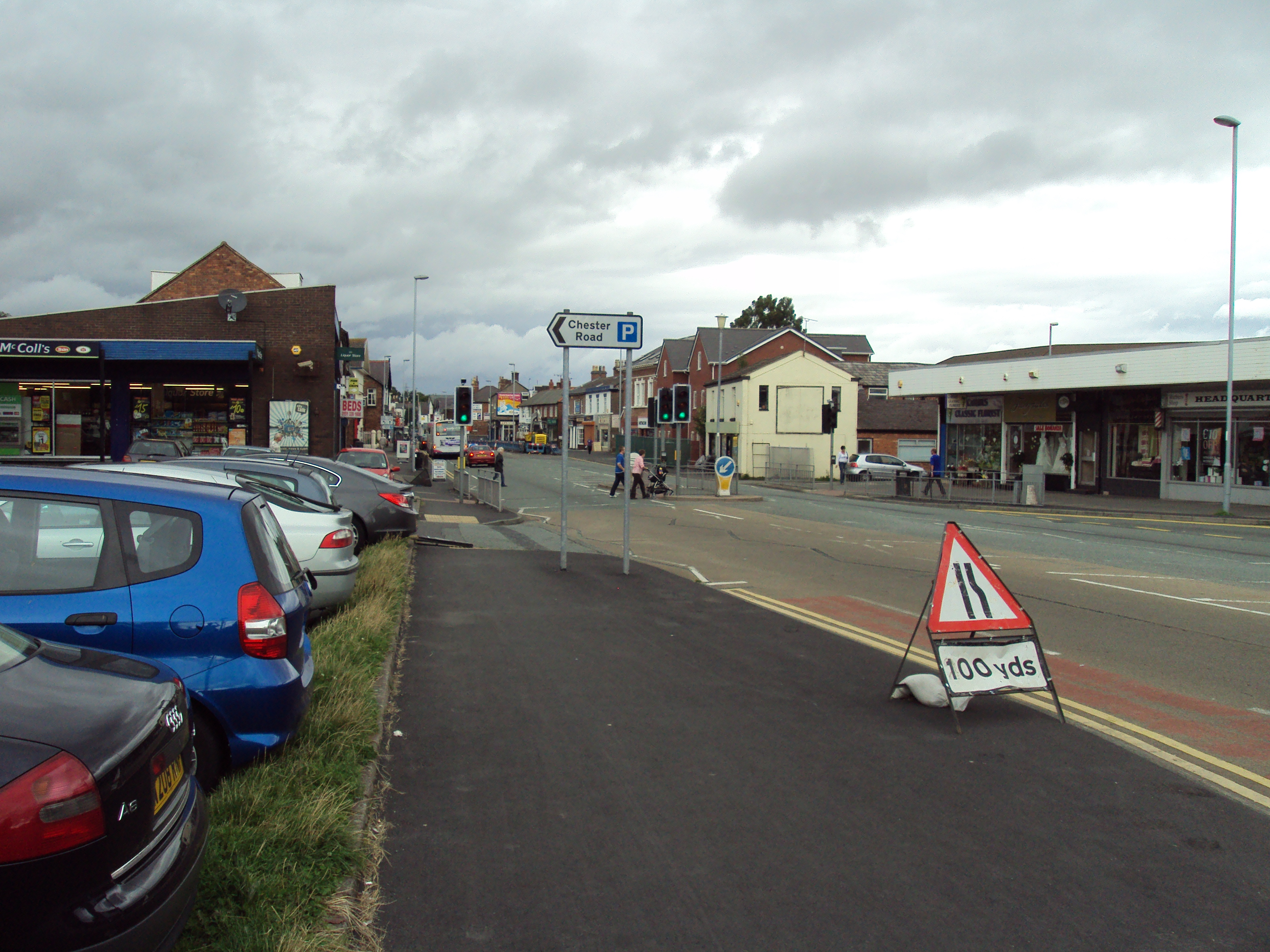
- A41 road in Little Sutton

- Location within Cheshire
- OS grid reference: SJ372769
- Unitary authority: Cheshire West and Chester
- Ceremonial county: Cheshire
- Region: North West
- Country: England
- Sovereign state: United Kingdom
- Post town: ELLESMERE PORT
- Postcode district: CH66
- Dialling code: 0151
- Police: Cheshire
- Fire: Cheshire
- Ambulance: North West
- UK Parliament: Ellesmere Port and Bromborough

Little Sutton is a village on the Wirral Peninsula, in the unitary authority area of Cheshire West and Chester and the ceremonial county of Cheshire, England. Located between Childer Thornton and Great Sutton, it is a suburb of the town of Ellesmere Port. Little Sutton is mostly residential and sits either side of the A41 road, linking Birkenhead and Chester.

== History ==
Little Sutton and neighbouring Great Sutton were mentioned in a single entry in the Domesday Book of 1086 as Sudtone, under the ownership of the canons of St Werburgh's Abbey.

Little Sutton was formerly a township in the parish of Eastham, in the Wirral Hundred. In 1866 Little Sutton became a separate civil parish, on 1 April 1950 the parish was abolished and merged with Ellesmere Port. The population was recorded at 166 in 1801, 432 in 1851 and rising to 1,109 in 1901. In 1931 the parish had a population of 2258. From 1974 to 2009 it was in Ellesmere Port and Neston district.

== Geography ==
Little Sutton is in the southern part of the Wirral Peninsula and a suburban area of the town of Ellesmere Port.

== Sports facilities ==
Hooton Lawn Tennis Club, which was established in 1912 but significantly rebuilt in 1999 and now provides its members with four artificial grass courts.

Ellesmere Port Golf Club, part of the Ian Woosnam Golf Academy, is an 18 hole golf course with practice facilities and a fitness suite. A former resident professional was Dick Burton (1907-1974), Open Championship winner 1939, renowned as the longest reigning Open Champion due to World War II. The championship was not played again until 1946.

Little Sutton Bowling Club is a crown green bowling club, situated next to the public library on the A41

== Religious sites ==
The Church of Saint Mary of the Angels, opened in 1879, is a Roman Catholic parish church in the Diocese of Shrewsbury. It is recorded in the National Heritage List for England as a designated Grade II listed building.

St Paul's Church opened in 1862. It is an Anglican parish church in the deanery of Wirral South, the Archdeaconry of Chester and the Diocese of Chester. The church is recorded in the National Heritage List for England as a designated Grade II* listed building.

Little Sutton Methodist Church is associated with the Wirral Methodist Circuit.

Dating from the 1830s, St George's United Reformed Church closed in 2020. The building was sold for redevelopment in 2021.

== Historic public houses ==
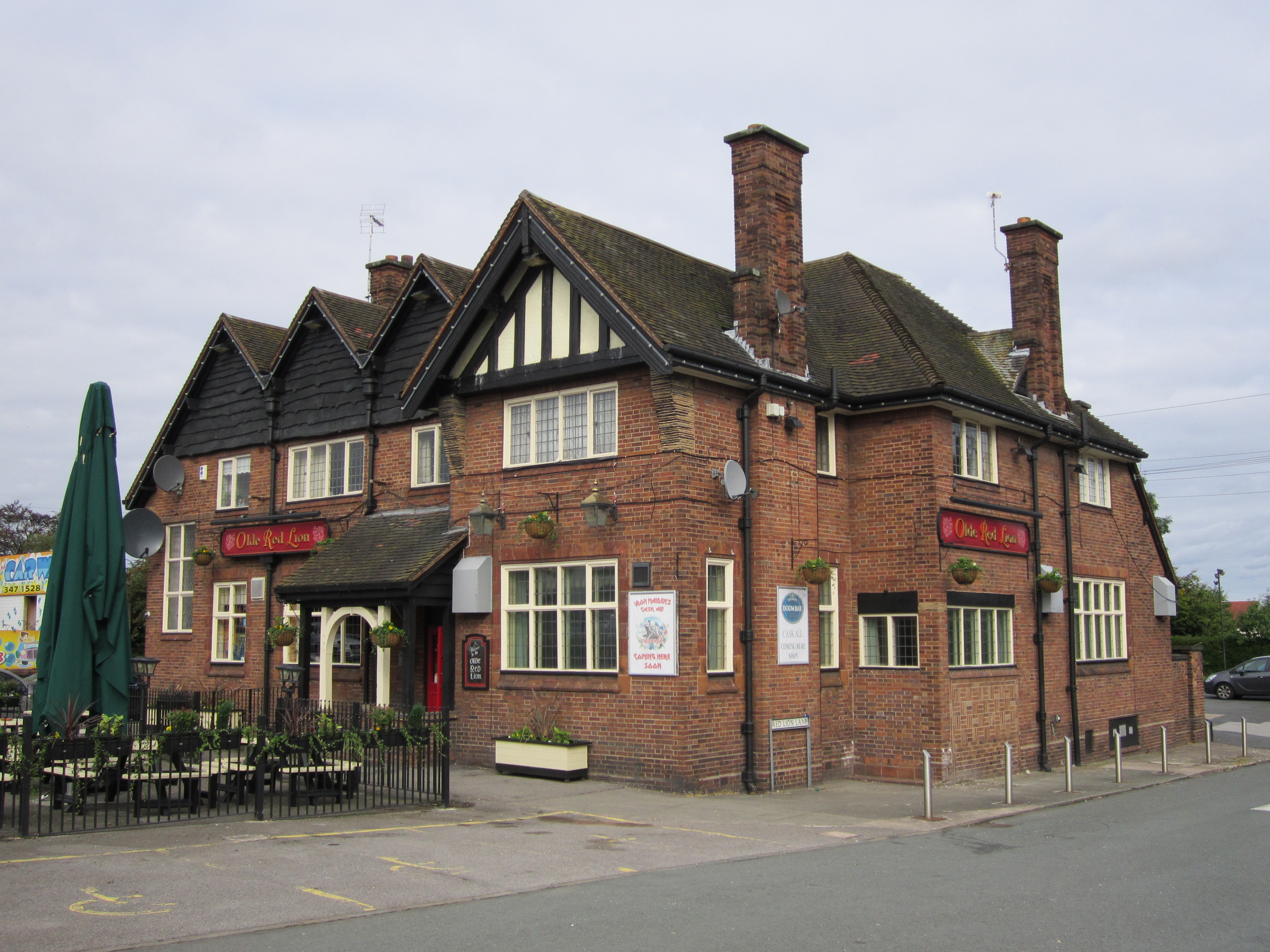
Olde Red Lion public house

The Olde Red Lion near the junction of Chester Road (A41) and Station Road (B5463) dates from about 1850. The original building was demolished in 1934 and re-sited further east to enable road widening.

== Transport ==
Little Sutton Railway Station is on the Wirral line of the Merseyrail network. Trains run every 30 minutes to Ellesmere Port and Liverpool Central.

Seven bus routes serve Little Sutton:

Route No.	From	To	Via	Frequency	Company	Notes
1 / X1	Liverpool	Chester	Cheshire Oaks, Ellesmere Port	Every 10 mins	Stagecoach	Quality Partnership
2	Liverpool	Chester	Hope Farm, Ellesmere Port	Every 10 mins	Arriva/Stagecoach	Quality Partnership
811/817	Leasowe	Broughton	Birkenhead	Every 1 Hour	Cumfybus	
106	Little Sutton	Cheshire Oaks	Bus Station	Every 1 Hour	Arrowebrook	Sunday Only
6	Glenwood Road/Childer Crescent	Stanney Grange	Bus Station	Every 20 mins	GHA Coaches/Stagecoach	Extends to Childer Crescent on Mondays, Wednesdays and Fridays
359	Neston (Raby Park Road)	Ellesmere Port	Willaston (a.m.)/Ledsham Road (p.m.)	1 a.m. journey and 1 p.m. journey	Helms of Eastham	
272	Neston Railway Station	Ellesmere Port	Willaston	Hourly	Helms of Eastham	

== See also ==
- Sutton Hall, Little Sutton
