= 2002 Ellesmere Port and Neston Borough Council election =

2002 UK local government election

Results of the 2002 Ellesmere Port and Neston Borough Council election

Elections to Ellesmere Port and Neston Borough Council were held on 2 May 2002. One third of the council was up for election and the Labour Party stayed in overall control of the council.

After the election, the composition of the council was:

- Labour 33
- Conservative 8
- Liberal Democrat 2

== Results ==
Ellesmere Port and Neston local election result 2002
| Party | Seats | Gains | Losses | Net gain/loss | Seats % | Votes % | Votes | +/− |
|---|---|---|---|---|---|---|---|---|
| Labour | 9 | | | -3 | 64.3 | 49.0 | 7,590 | |
| Conservative | 4 | | | +2 | 28.6 | 41.0 | 6,347 | |
| Liberal Democrats | 1 | | | +1 | 7.1 | 10.1 | 1,558 | |

== Ward results ==
Grange
| Party | Candidate | Votes | % | ±% |
|---|---|---|---|---|
| Labour | Diane Roberts | 772 | 82.1 | |
| Conservative | Elizabeth Bryan | 168 | 17.9 | |
| Majority | | 604 | 64.2 | |
| Turnout | | 940 | | |

Ledsham
| Party | Candidate | Votes | % | ±% |
|---|---|---|---|---|
| Conservative | Gareth Anderson | 662 | 45.0 | |
| Labour | Barbara Shephard | 617 | 41.9 | |
| Liberal Democrats | Graham Handley | 193 | 13.1 | |
| Majority | | 45 | 3.1 | |
| Turnout | | 1,472 | | |

Neston
| Party | Candidate | Votes | % | ±% |
|---|---|---|---|---|
| Labour | Judith Pugh | 584 | 61.9 | |
| Conservative | Peter Kevan | 274 | 29.0 | |
| Liberal Democrats | Michael Shipman | 86 | 9.1 | |
| Majority | | 310 | 32.9 | |
| Turnout | | 944 | | |

Parkgate
| Party | Candidate | Votes | % | ±% |
|---|---|---|---|---|
| Conservative | Moira Andrews | 887 | 71.1 | |
| Labour | Susan Davies | 361 | 28.9 | |
| Majority | | 526 | 42.2 | |
| Turnout | | 1,248 | | |

Pooltown
| Party | Candidate | Votes | % | ±% |
|---|---|---|---|---|
| Labour | Patricia Dowling | 425 | 65.2 | |
| Conservative | Janice Farquharson | 134 | 20.6 | |
| Liberal Democrats | Mary Handley | 93 | 14.3 | |
| Majority | | 291 | 44.6 | |
| Turnout | | 652 | | |

Riverside
| Party | Candidate | Votes | % | ±% |
|---|---|---|---|---|
| Liberal Democrats | Thomas Marlow | 507 | 42.7 | |
| Conservative | Edna Lewis | 355 | 29.9 | |
| Labour | David Rudd | 326 | 27.4 | |
| Majority | | 152 | 12.8 | |
| Turnout | | 1,188 | | |

Rossmore
| Party | Candidate | Votes | % | ±% |
|---|---|---|---|---|
| Labour | Patricia Merrick | 729 | 55.5 | |
| Conservative | Joseph Brundrit | 332 | 25.3 | |
| Liberal Democrats | Michael English | 253 | 19.3 | |
| Majority | | 397 | 30.2 | |
| Turnout | | 1,314 | | |

Stanlow and Wolverham
| Party | Candidate | Votes | % | ±% |
|---|---|---|---|---|
| Labour | David Garroch | 712 | 81.4 | |
| Conservative | Nicholas Hebson | 163 | 18.6 | |
| Majority | | 549 | 62.8 | |
| Turnout | | 875 | | |

Strawberry Fields
| Party | Candidate | Votes | % | ±% |
|---|---|---|---|---|
| Labour | Ian Ormerod | 467 | 47.8 | |
| Conservative | Karl Hardwick | 361 | 36.9 | |
| Liberal Democrats | Hilary Chrusciezl | 150 | 15.3 | |
| Majority | | 106 | 10.9 | |
| Turnout | | 978 | | |

Sutton
| Party | Candidate | Votes | % | ±% |
|---|---|---|---|---|
| Labour | Tamara Hill | 638 | 56.7 | |
| Conservative | Simon Eardley | 330 | 29.3 | |
| Liberal Democrats | John Falconer | 158 | 14.0 | |
| Majority | | 308 | 27.4 | |
| Turnout | | 1,126 | | |

Sutton Green and Manor
| Party | Candidate | Votes | % | ±% |
|---|---|---|---|---|
| Conservative | Susan Kettle | 468 | 48.3 | |
| Labour | George Foster | 383 | 39.5 | |
| Liberal Democrats | Joanna Pemberton | 118 | 12.2 | |
| Majority | | 85 | 8.8 | |
| Turnout | | 969 | | |

Westminster
| Party | Candidate | Votes | % | ±% |
|---|---|---|---|---|
| Labour | Kenneth Spain | 587 | 80.9 | |
| Conservative | Thomas Hughes | 139 | 19.1 | |
| Majority | | 448 | 61.8 | |
| Turnout | | 726 | | |

Whitby
| Party | Candidate | Votes | % | ±% |
|---|---|---|---|---|
| Labour | Mike McCusker | 764 | 52.2 | |
| Conservative | Jonathan Starkey | 699 | 47.8 | |
| Majority | | 65 | 4.4 | |
| Turnout | | 1,463 | | |

Willaston and Thornton
| Party | Candidate | Votes | % | ±% |
|---|---|---|---|---|
| Conservative | Andrew Hogg | 1,375 | 85.9 | |
| Labour | Catherine Sherlock | 225 | 14.1 | |
| Majority | | 1,150 | 71.8 | |
| Turnout | | 1,600 | | |
