= Westminster, Ellesmere Port =

Coordinates: 53.285°N 2.898°W

Westminster
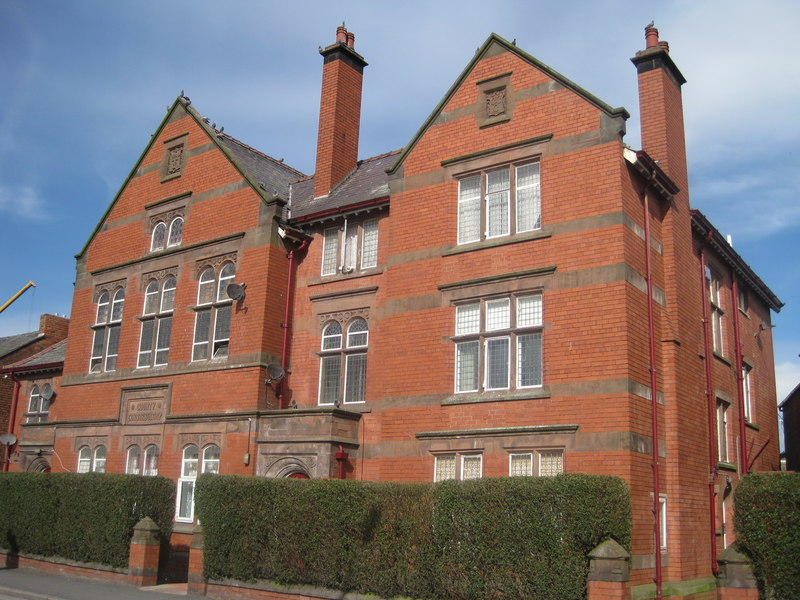
- Old Court House, Westminster Road

- Location within Cheshire
- OS grid reference: SJ 402 768
- Unitary authority: Cheshire West and Chester
- Ceremonial county: Cheshire
- Region: North West
- Country: England
- Sovereign state: United Kingdom
- Post town: ELLESMERE PORT
- Postcode district: CH65
- Dialling code: 0151
- Police: Cheshire
- Fire: Cheshire
- Ambulance: North West
- UK Parliament: Ellesmere Port and Bromborough

Westminster is a suburb of the town of Ellesmere Port, Cheshire, England. It is a ward of the unitary authority of Cheshire West and Chester. Located to the north of the town centre, Westminster consists of largely early 20th century terraced housing towards the Manchester Ship Canal and post-war properties further inland. The Joseph Groome Towers are three thirteen-storey tower blocks built as public housing in the 1960s.

== Demography ==
In 2017 Westminster had an estimated population of 4,500. According to the 2011 census, 69.9% of residents were economically active and 6.7% of the population were from ethnic minorities.

== Attractions ==
To the north of the suburb is the Canal Village, which is the location of the National Waterways Museum.

== Education ==
The area has just one school, Westminster Community Primary.

== Transport ==
Ellesmere Port railway station is located in Westminster and provides a half-hourly service to Liverpool Central, via the Wirral line of the Merseyrail network. The station is also the western terminus of a limited service from Helsby and Warrington Bank Quay.

The M53 motorway bisects the suburb to the north. The main A5032 road runs from junction 9 of the motorway towards Ellesmere Port town centre.
