= Great Sutton =

Village in Cheshire, England

Coordinates: 53.28°N 2.92°W

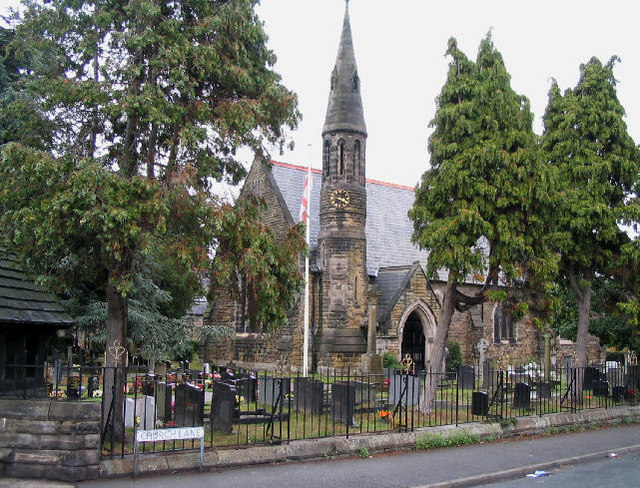
- St John the Evangelist Church

- Location within Cheshire
- OS grid reference: SJ383762
- Unitary authority: Cheshire West and Chester
- Ceremonial county: Cheshire
- Region: North West
- Country: England
- Sovereign state: United Kingdom
- Post town: ELLESMERE PORT
- Postcode district: CH65, CH66
- Dialling code: 0151
- Police: Cheshire
- Fire: Cheshire
- Ambulance: North West
- UK Parliament: Ellesmere Port and Bromborough

Great Sutton is a village on the Wirral Peninsula, in the unitary authority area of Cheshire West and Chester and the ceremonial county of Cheshire, England. It is a suburb of Ellesmere Port and, as with Little Sutton to the north, was once a separate village that was incorporated into the town as it expanded outwards.

== History ==
Great Sutton and Little Sutton were mentioned in a single entry in the Domesday Book of 1086 as Sudtone, under the ownership of the canons of St Werburgh's Abbey.

The village was part of the parish of Eastham in the Wirral Hundred. in 1866 Great Sutton became a separate civil parish, on 1 April 1950 the parish was abolished and merged with Ellesmere Port. The population was recorded at 153 in 1801, 203 in 1851 and 397 in 1901. In 1931 the parish had a population of 662. From 1974 to 2009 it was in Ellesmere Port and Neston district.

Great Sutton is a residential area close to the A41 road that links Birkenhead and Chester. The White Swan Inn public house dates back to about 1850. The Church of St John the Evangelist on Chester Road (A41) was consecrated in November 1879.

The village was struck by an F1/T3 tornado on 23 November 1981, part of the record-breaking nationwide tornado outbreak on that day.

== Geography ==
Great Sutton is in the southern part of the Wirral Peninsula and a suburban area of the town of Ellesmere Port.

== Transport ==
The nearest railway stations are in Little Sutton (towards Ellesmere Port) and Capenhurst (towards Chester). Both stations are on the Wirral line of the Merseyrail network.

The bus service between Liverpool and Chester passes through Great Sutton.

== See also ==
- Listed buildings in Great Sutton
