= Sutton Hall, Little Sutton =

Coordinates: 53.2822°N 2.9550°W

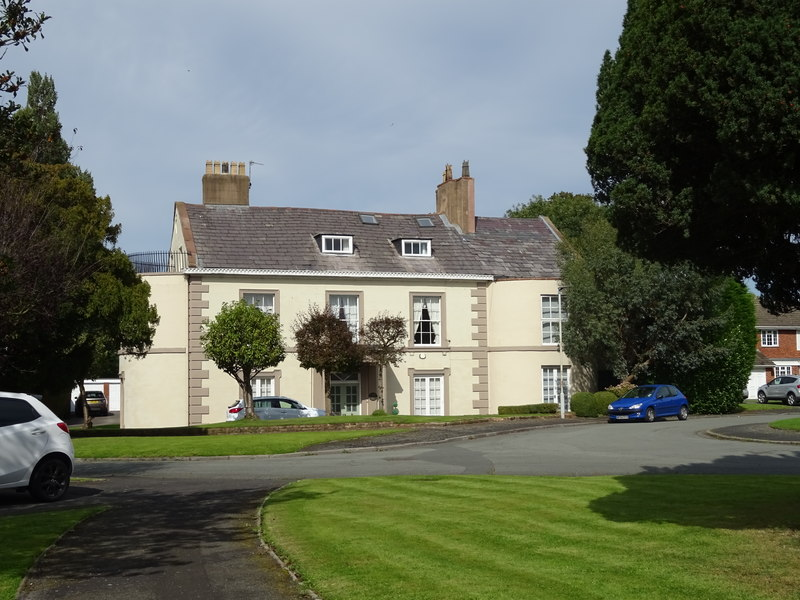
Sutton Hall (2019)

Sutton Hall is in the village of Little Sutton, Cheshire, England. It is recorded in the National Heritage List for England as a designated Grade II listed building.

The house dates mainly from the early 19th century but has a core dating from the late 17th or early 18th century. Its architectural style is late Georgian and early Regency. Its walls are rendered with rusticated quoins. The house is in two storeys with an attic. At the front is a Tuscan portico with two columns at the front and pilasters at the rear. Most of the windows are sashes. To the east is an added wing with a large full-height bow window, and there is a similar window at the west gable end.
