= Listed buildings in Great Sutton =

Great Sutton is a village in Cheshire West and Chester, England. It contains four buildings that are recorded in the National Heritage List for England as designated listed buildings, all of which are listed at Grade II. This grade is the lowest of the three gradings given to listed buildings and is applied to "buildings of national importance and special interest". The listed buildings consist of a church and associated structures, a war memorial, and two lamp posts.

Name and location	Photograph	Date	Notes
St John's Church, parish hall, walls, gates and lychgate 53.2734°N 2.9362°W		1879–80	The church is in sandstone with a slate roof, and consists of a nave, a south porch, a chancel, and a southwest turret. The turret is cylindrical, and has a spire with a clock face, lancet bell openings, and lucarnes. To the north is a school, later a parish hall, with a T-shaped plan. It is also in stone and with red clay ridge tiles and a flèche. Around the churchyard is a stone wall with iron railings. This contains a gateway with wrought iron gates and cast iron gateposts. At the entrance to the churchyard is a lychgate with stone walls and an oak roof and gates.
Lamp-post and lantern, Entrance to Great Sutton Manor; 53.26757°N 2.93567°W	—	c. 1900	The lamp post is in cast iron and has four legs carrying a console and a circlet containing a liver bird. On the top is an octagonal lantern.
Lamp-post and lantern, Drive to Great Sutton Manor; 53.26747°N 2.93556°W	—	c. 1900	The lamp post is in cast iron and has four legs carrying a console and a circlet. The liver bird is missing. On the top is an octagonal lantern.
War memorial 53.27330°N 2.93645°W	—	c. 1920	The war memorial is in the churchyard of St John's Church. It is in stone and consists of a tall cross on a square base with a corniced block on each corner. On this is an octagonal plinth and a pedestal with a partly embattled top. From this rises a tapering shaft carrying a cross with a complex design decorated with daisies and the monogram IHS. Inscriptions and the names of those lost in both World Wars and the Falklands War are carved on the plinth and the pedestal.

== See also ==
- Listed buildings in Ellesmere Port
