= 2000 Ellesmere Port and Neston Borough Council election =

2000 UK local government election

Elections to Ellesmere Port and Neston Borough Council were held on 4 May 2000. One third of the council was up for election and the Labour Party stayed in overall control of the council.

After the election, the composition of the council was:

- Labour 36
- Conservative 6
- Liberal Democrat 1

== Results ==
Ellesmere Port and Neston local election result 2000
Party	Seats	Gains	Losses	Net gain/loss	Seats %	Votes %	Votes	+/−
Labour	12			-1	75.0			
Conservative	3			+1	18.8			
Liberal Democrats	1			0	6.3			
