= Ellesmere Port and Neston =

English borough

Coordinates: 53.276°N 2.969°W

Borough of Ellesmere Port and Neston
- Shown within Cheshire
- History
  - Origin: Ellesmere Port Municipal Borough; Neston Urban District
  - Created: 1 April 1974
  - Abolished: 31 March 2009
  - Succeeded by: Cheshire West and Chester
- Status: Non-metropolitan district
- ONS code: 13UE
  - HQ: Ellesmere Port

Ellesmere Port and Neston was, from 1974 to 2009, a local government district with borough status in Cheshire, England. It covered the southern part of the Wirral Peninsula, namely that part which is not included in the Metropolitan Borough of Wirral.

The district had a population of about 81,800 (2006 estimate). The main towns were Ellesmere Port and Neston as well as the village of Parkgate. It also included a number of villages such as Great Sutton and Willaston.

== History ==
The district was created on 1 April 1974 under the Local Government Act 1972 by the merger of the borough of Ellesmere Port and the urban district of Neston. The district was originally called just Ellesmere Port, with the council changing the name in 1976. The new district was awarded borough status from its creation, allowing the chairman of the council to take the title of mayor.

In 2006 the Department for Communities and Local Government considered reorganising Cheshire's administrative structure as part of the 2009 structural changes to local government in England. The decision to merge Ellesmere Port and Neston with the districts of Chester and Vale Royal to create a single unitary authority was announced on 25 July 2007, following a consultation period in which a proposal to create a single Cheshire unitary authority was rejected.

Ellesmere Port and Neston was abolished on 31 March 2009, with the area becoming part of the new unitary authority of Cheshire West and Chester from 1 April 2009.

== Civil parishes ==
The entire borough was initially unparished. A civil parish of Ince was created in 1987, and a Neston parish was created in 2008.

== Political control ==
The town of Ellesmere Port had been a municipal borough from 1955 to 1974 with a borough council. The first elections to the new Ellesmere Port Borough Council created under the Local Government Act 1972 were held in 1973, initially operating as a shadow authority until the new arrangements came into effect on 1 April 1974. Throughout the council's existence from 1974 until 2009, Labour held a majority of the seats on the council.

| Party in control | Years |
|---|---|
| Labour | 1974–2009 |

=== Leadership ===
The first leader of the council, Fred Venables, had been the leader of the old Ellesmere Port Borough Council since 1970. The leaders of Ellesmere Port and Neston Borough Council were:

| Councillor | Party | From | To |
|---|---|---|---|
| Fred Venables | Labour | 1 Apr 1974 | Oct 2005 |
| Reg Chrimes | Labour | 25 Oct 2005 | 6 May 2007 |
| Justin Madders | Labour | May 2007 | 31 Mar 2009 |

=== Composition ===
The political composition of the council at its abolition in 2009 was:

| Party | Councillors |
| Labour | 23 |
| Conservative | 17 |
| Liberal Democrat | 2 |

== Premises ==
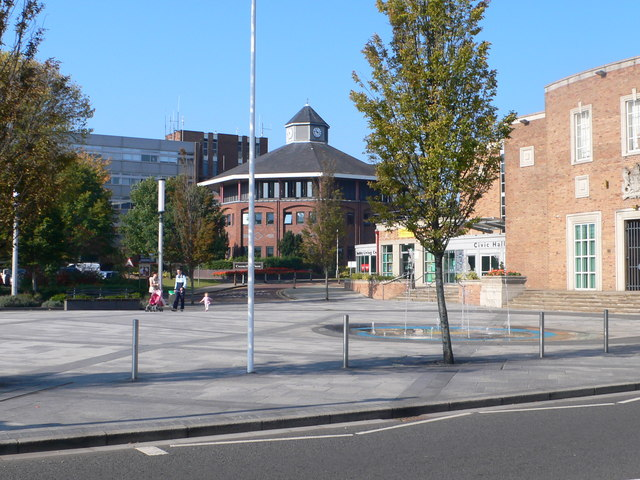
Council Offices (centre and left) with 1955 Civic Hall to right

The council was based at the Ellesmere Port Council Offices at 4 Civic Way, Ellesmere Port, which had been built for the old borough council in 1969. Council meetings were held at nearby Whitby Hall until 1992 when an extension containing a council chamber was opened at the Municipal Buildings. Following the abolition of the council the Council Offices were used by its successor, Cheshire West and Chester Council, until 2022 when they were replaced by a new building called "The Portal" on Wellington Road.

== Council elections ==
- 1973 Ellesmere Port Borough Council election
- 1976 Ellesmere Port Borough Council election (New ward boundaries)
- 1979 Ellesmere Port and Neston Borough Council election
- 1980 Ellesmere Port and Neston Borough Council election
- 1982 Ellesmere Port and Neston Borough Council election
- 1983 Ellesmere Port and Neston Borough Council election
- 1984 Ellesmere Port and Neston Borough Council election
- 1986 Ellesmere Port and Neston Borough Council election
- 1987 Ellesmere Port and Neston Borough Council election
- 1988 Ellesmere Port and Neston Borough Council election
- 1990 Ellesmere Port and Neston Borough Council election
- 1991 Ellesmere Port and Neston Borough Council election
- 1992 Ellesmere Port and Neston Borough Council election
- 1994 Ellesmere Port and Neston Borough Council election (Borough boundary changes took place but the number of seats remained the same)
- 1995 Ellesmere Port and Neston Borough Council election
- 1996 Ellesmere Port and Neston Borough Council election
- 1998 Ellesmere Port and Neston Borough Council election
- 1999 Ellesmere Port and Neston Borough Council election (New ward boundaries)
- 2000 Ellesmere Port and Neston Borough Council election
- 2002 Ellesmere Port and Neston Borough Council election
- 2003 Ellesmere Port and Neston Borough Council election
- 2004 Ellesmere Port and Neston Borough Council election
- 2006 Ellesmere Port and Neston Borough Council election
- 2007 Ellesmere Port and Neston Borough Council election

=== Results maps ===
2002 results map

2003 results map

2004 results map

2006 results map

2007 results map

=== By-election results ===
Longview By-Election 22 June 2000
| Party | Candidate | Votes | % | ±% |
|---|---|---|---|---|
| Conservative | | 1,315 | 58.0 | +2.0 |
| Labour | | 543 | 24.0 | +3.4 |
| Liberal Democrats | | 401 | 17.8 | +17.8 |
| Majority | | 772 | 34.0 | |
| Turnout | | 2,259 | | |
| Conservative hold | | Swing | | |

Central By-Election 17 July 2003
| Party | Candidate | Votes | % | ±% |
|---|---|---|---|---|
| Labour | Elizabeth Sherlock | 319 | 44.3 | −33.3 |
| Liberal Democrats | Maurice Brookes | 262 | 36.4 | +36.4 |
| BNP | David Jones | 77 | 10.7 | +10.7 |
| Conservative | Janice Farquharson | 49 | 6.8 | −15.6 |
| UKIP | Geoffrey Gregory | 13 | 1.8 | +1.8 |
| Majority | | 57 | 7.9 | |
| Turnout | | 720 | 26.1 | |
| Labour hold | | Swing | | |

Stanlow & Wolverham By-Election 11 November 2004
| Party | Candidate | Votes | % | ±% |
|---|---|---|---|---|
| Labour | John Wilson | 450 | 60.8 | −14.5 |
| Liberal Democrats | Hilary Chrusciezl | 117 | 15.8 | +15.8 |
| Conservative | Nicholas Hebson | 92 | 12.4 | −12.3 |
| BNP | David Joines | 81 | 10.9 | +10.9 |
| Majority | | 333 | 45.0 | |
| Turnout | | 740 | 26.1 | |
| Labour hold | | Swing | | |

Little Neston By-Election 5 October 2006
| Party | Candidate | Votes | % | ±% |
|---|---|---|---|---|
| Labour | Michael Clarkson | 420 | 47.4 | −2.1 |
| Conservative | William Mealor | 386 | 43.5 | +5.4 |
| Liberal Democrats | Graham Handley | 81 | 9.1 | +9.1 |
| Majority | | 34 | 3.9 | |
| Turnout | | 887 | 32.5 | |
| Labour gain from Conservative | | Swing | | |

Rossmore By-Election 18 October 2007
| Party | Candidate | Votes | % | ±% |
|---|---|---|---|---|
| Labour | Susan Pugh | 504 | 54.4 | −4.0 |
| Conservative | Michael English | 325 | 35.1 | −6.5 |
| English Democrat | Maurice Brookes | 60 | 6.5 | +6.5 |
| Liberal Democrats | Graham Handley | 38 | 4.1 | +4.1 |
| Majority | | 179 | 19.3 | |
| Turnout | | 927 | 20.0 | |
| Labour hold | | Swing | | |

Westminster By-Election 28 February 2008
| Party | Candidate | Votes | % | ±% |
|---|---|---|---|---|
| Labour | Mike McCusker | 227 | 57.5 | −11.0 |
| Conservative | Thomas Hughes | 123 | 31.1 | −0.4 |
| Liberal Democrats | Hilary Chrusciezi | 45 | 11.4 | +11.4 |
| Majority | | 104 | 26.4 | |
| Turnout | | 395 | 15 | |
| Labour hold | | Swing | | |
