= Ian Prowse =

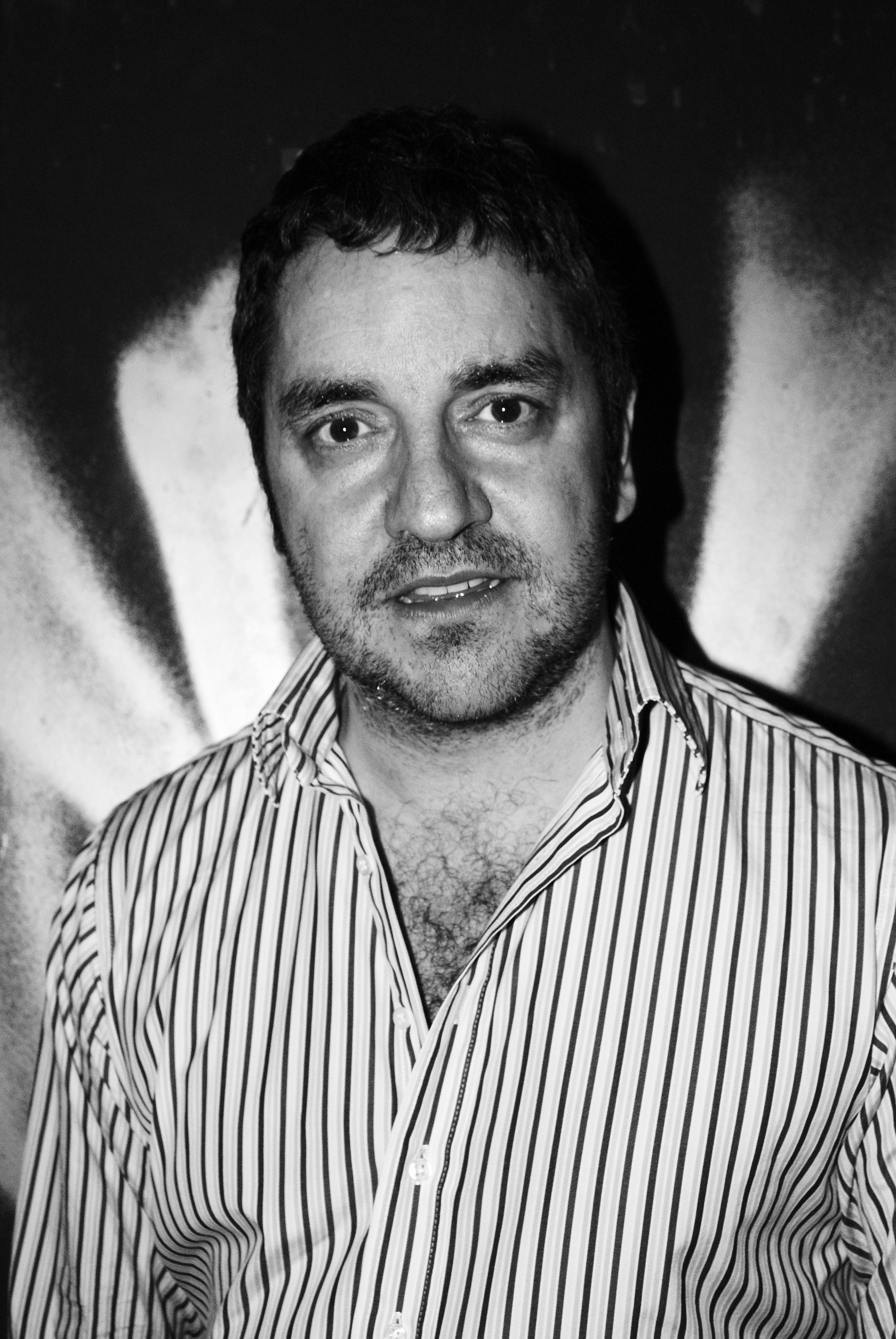
- Ian Prowse in 2010

Background information
- Born: Ian Prowse; 10 January 1964 (age 62); Chester, England
- Origin: Ellesmere Port, Cheshire, England
- Genres: Pop, alternative rock, Celtic
- Occupation: Singer-songwriter
- Instrument: Guitar
- Years active: 1990–present
- Labels: CIA Records, IRL Records

Ian Prowse (born 10 January 1964) is an English singer-songwriter, currently frontman of Amsterdam and previously of Pele.

== Biography ==
=== Pele ===
Prowse formed Pele in 1989 along with Dally (drums), Robbo (Hammond), Nico (violin) and Jim McCallister (bass). Signed by Michael Levy, Baron Levy in March 1991 to M&G Records/Polydor, the band went on to release two studio albums (Fireworks & The Sport Of Kings), one live album and six singles. Pele's singles never reached the Top 40 in the UK Singles Chart, with it being often remarked that Pele sold more of their famous primary colour T-shirts than they did records. However they scored a number one single in South Africa with "Megalomania", and had other hits in Holland, Portugal and Belgium. After nine tours of the UK, including those with Del Amitri and The Pogues, they split in 1996 due to problems with the record company whose efforts to make Prowse record as a solo artist were resisted by the singer. Prowse celebrated the 25th anniversary of first album Fireworks with a UK tour in the early 2017 with a 25th anniversary of The Sport of Kings tour announced for 2018.

=== Amsterdam ===
Prowse went on to form Amsterdam in 1999 with former Blow Monkeys drummer Tony Kiley and cousin Johnny Barlow. It was not until September 2004 that the band managed to secure a record deal in the form of London-based Beat Crazy. They released one album The Journey in February 2005 and three singles, "The Journey" (which hit number 32 in the UK Singles Chart) and "Does This Train Stop on Merseyside" also hit the lower reaches of the chart. The partnership was dissolved by mutual consent in 2006.

The band then signed to The Stranglers’ management company and released their next album Arm in Arm on CIA Recordings in 2008.

"Does This Train Stop on Merseyside" regularly elicited an emotional response from Radio 1 DJ John Peel. Peel's widow Sheila Ravenscroft gave a Radio 1 interview after the DJ's death and confirmed that 'He was not capable of playing it without crying'. The song itself got a further lease of life in 2009 as one of the centre pieces of Christy Moore's album Listen, which spent five weeks at the top spot in his home country.

During this time, the band struck up a friendship with Elvis Costello who used them as his backing band on the Jonathan Ross television show as well as support act on several occasions. Prowse also performed a duet with Costello for EMI Records with a cover of The Searchers' 1964 hit "Don't Throw Your Love Away" for the Liverpool Number Ones Project in 2008. He also picked up a musical icon award on Costello's behalf at Liverpool's Titanic Hotel in November 2014.

== Discography ==
=== Albums ===
- Does This Train Stop on Merseyside: The Very Best of Ian Prowse (CIA Recordings) 2012
- Who Loves Ya Baby (IRL) 2014
- Companeros (Learpholl Recordings) 2015
- Here I Lie (Kitchen Disco Records) 2019
- The Story of Ian Prowse (Kitchen Disco Records) 2020
- One Hand on the Starry Plough (Kitchen Disco Records) 2021
- No Names (Learpholl Music) 2026

=== Singles ===
- "Rosalita" (with Steve White)/ "Cecilia" 7" – Feat. Dan Donnell) (80's Vinyl Records) 2013
- "God & Man" Digital/Video Single (IRL) 2014
- "I Did It for Love" Digital/Video Single (IRL) 2014
- "Lest We Forget" Video Single (IRL) 2014
- "Mississippi Beat" Digital/ Video Single (Feat. Pauline Scanlon (Learpholl) 2015
- "You Can't Win Em All Mum" Digital/ Video single (Learpholl) 2015

== Other work ==
Prowse is a member of the Irish Sea Sessions, which is described as "Part super group, part colossal session and part festival, all in a single gig".

April 2012 saw the release of the career spanning Does This Train Stop On Merseyside: The Very Best Of Ian Prowse. Prowse and former Style Council drummer Steve White released a version of Bruce Springsteen song "Rosalita" in 2013, for the 'Check 'em Lads' testicular cancer charity. Prowse has a young daughter named after the song. He released his first solo album, Who Loves Ya Baby? in March 2014 initially via PledgeMusic and then IRL Records.

Prowse also graduated with a BA (Hons) History Degree in 2009 and completed a master's degree in Irish Studies in 2010 at the University of Liverpool. His Masters thesis was entitled 'Locating the Role of Christy Moore in Irish Folk and Traditional Music'.

Prowse released his second solo album Companeros in 2015, the project rediscovered long lost songs from the British Isles. Elvis Costello invited Ian Prowse to be his special guest on his Just Trust UK Tour in 2020.

Podcast - Prowse joined former BBC Merseyside boss Mick Ord and Baltic Triangle Director Russell Gannon to produce a podcast called Misadventures in Music. The discussions take the listener on journey through the music that the presenters love.
