= Whitby Park =

Park in Ellesmere Port, Cheshire, England

Coordinates: 53°16′20″N 2°54′10″W

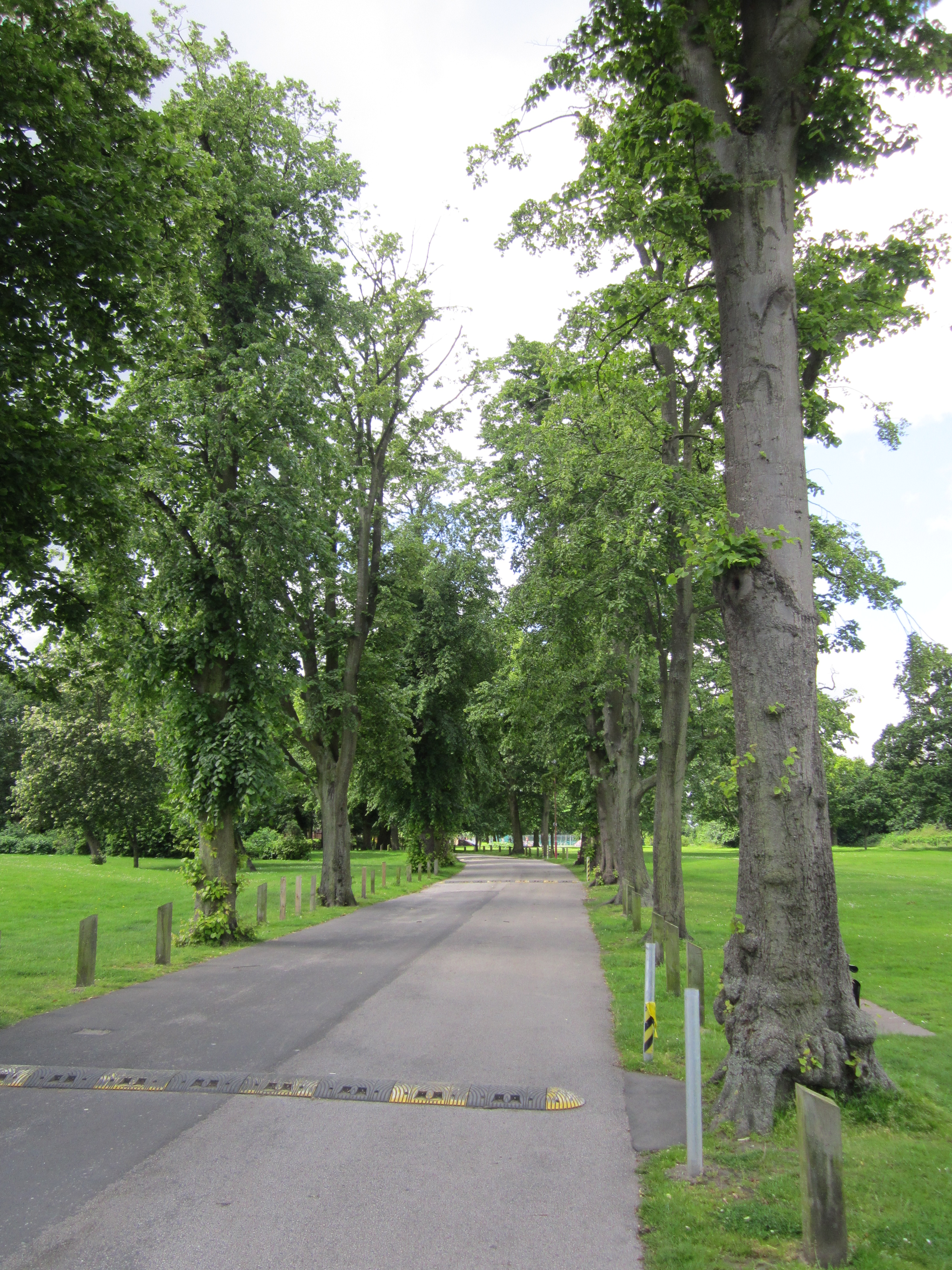
The entrance to Whitby Park

Whitby Park is the main urban park in Ellesmere Port, Cheshire, England. It is managed by Cheshire West and Chester Council.

== History ==
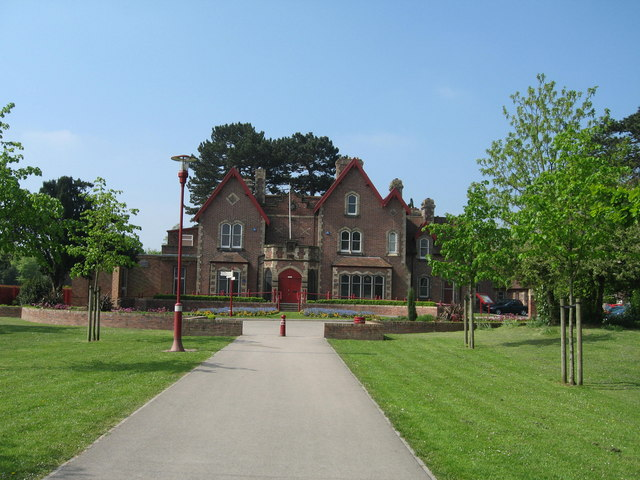
Whitby Hall

The park was formerly the grounds of Whitby Hall, a Victorian house built in the 1860s by the Grace family, until being bought by the district council in 1931 and turned into a park.

Whitby Hall is the home to Action Transport Theatre.

== Facilities ==
The park has formal gardens, football pitches, a climbing area, a basketball court, tennis courts, crown green bowling, dog walking, skatepark, a wooded copse, fish pond and two children's play areas. A short (0.4 mile) sculpture trail featuring work by artist Steve des Landes on the theme of Air Quality loops around Whitby Hall.

== See also ==
- List of parks and open spaces in Cheshire
