= Amsterdam (band) =

English pop/rock band

- Origin: Liverpool, England
- Genres: Pop, rock
- Years active: 1999–present
- Labels: Beat Crazy, CIA
- Members: Ian Prowse; Johnny Barlow; Tony Kiley; Kevin Spurgeon; Anastasia Risnes; Eimear McGeowan; Dave Mastrocola
- Past members: Genevieve Mort; Nigel Hopkins; Paul Hagan; Pete O'Connor; Deian Elfryn
- Website: www.amsterdam-music.com

Amsterdam are an English pop/rock group based in Liverpool. Formed in 1999, they had their first UK Top 40 single with "The Journey" in February 2005. The current band members are Ian Prowse (vocals/guitar), Johnny Barlow (lead guitar), Tony Kiley (drums), Kevin Spurgeon (keyboards), Eimear McGeowan (flute), Anastasia Risnes (violin) Laura MacMillan (violin) and Dave Mastrocola (bass guitar).

== Biography ==
Amsterdam were formed on Merseyside in 1999, and the following year won an NME competition to find the best unsigned band of 2000. They were also among the winners at the prestigious music business event In the City. Amsterdam appeared on an EMI compilation album, Mersey Boys and Liverpool Girls, alongside Paul McCartney and other Liverpool musicians. They performed sell out shows in Liverpool and London to critical acclaim, and played three tracks on Janice Long's BBC Radio 2 show.

Elvis Costello invited the band to play with him live on BBC TV's Jonathan Ross Show to promote his new single. This was followed by opening for Costello in Amsterdam and at the Kings Arena in Liverpool, on his world tour. Amsterdam also made the last-ever John Peel Festive Fifty with "Does This Train Stop on Merseyside?".

Following the recruitment of new bassist Paul Hagan, the band signed to London-based indie label Beat Crazy Records, and recorded their debut album, The Journey. The first single, "The Journey" reached No. 32 in the UK Singles Chart in January 2005, issued as a double-A side with "Stop Knocking The Walls Down" by Ricky. The follow-up "Does This Train Stop on Merseyside?" also hit the chart in June 2005, followed by the album release. The third single, "Takin' On The World", was playlisted on BBC Radio 2 and many other stations.

The band announced on 14 June 2006 that they had parted company with the record label, Beat Crazy. A live album, 1,2,3,4 was released, featuring fifteen live tracks, and a studio album Arm In Arm was released on 17 March 2008.

Amsterdam played at the Liverpool International Music Festival in 2014 and continue to perform, record and tour as 'Ian Prowse & Amsterdam'.

Amsterdam reissued their 2001 album Attitunes on Kitchen Disco Records in 2021.

== Members ==
Current

- Ian Prowse – vocals, guitar (1999–present)
- Johnny Barlow – bass, lead guitar (1999–present)
- Tony Kiley – drums, percussion (1999–present)
- Kevin Spurgeon – keyboards (2005–present)
- Eimear McGeowan – flute (2008–present)
- Fiona McConnell - flute (2011-present)
- Laura MacMillan - violin (2012-present)
- Anastasia Risnes - violin (2011–present)
- Dave Mastrocola – bass (2009–present)

Former

- Genevieve Mort – vocals, guitar, flute (1999–2003)
- Nigel Hopkins – keyboards (1999–2005)
- Paul Hagan – bass (2003–2008)
- Pete O'Connor – drums (2005–2008)

== Discography ==
=== Studio albums ===
- Attitunes (2001) (internet only) – reissued in 2021
- The Curse (2002) (internet only) – reissued in 2023
- The Journey (2005) – reissued in 2025
- Arm in Arm (2008)

=== Live and compilation albums ===
- Live, Left and Covered (2001) (compilation album)
- Live Bootleg (2003) (live video)
- The Journey (2005) (compilation album)
- OneTwoThreeFour – Live at The Borderline (2007) (live album)
- The Glorious Return of Amsterdam: Live in Liverpool (2010) (live video)

=== Singles ===
Year	Title	Peak chart positions	Album
Year	Title	UK	Album
2001	"Love Phenomenon"	–	Attitunes
2005	"The Journey"	32	The Journey
2005	"Does This Train Stop on Merseyside?"	53	The Journey
2005	"Takin' on the World"	90	The Journey
2007	"Home"	–	Arm in Arm
2008	"Hey Hilary"	–	Arm in Arm
