= Reg Chrimes =

British politician (1924–2021)

Ellesmere Port and Neston Borough Council Councillor for Little Neston
- In office 1974–2007

Neston Urban District Council Councillor for Little Neston
- In office 1949–1974

Personal details
- Born: December 1924; Neston, Cheshire, England
- Died: 13 September 2021 (aged 96)
- Political party: Labour
- Education: Sefton Park Training College
- Military career
- Allegiance: United Kingdom
- Service / branch: Air Force
- Battles / wars: World War II

Reginald Braithwaite Chrimes OBE (December 1924 – 13 September 2021) was a British Labour Party politician.

== Early life ==
Chrimes was born in Neston, Cheshire in December 1924. He was educated at Calday Grange Grammar School in West Kirby, then trained to be a teacher at the Sefton Park Training College. He served in the Royal Air Force during World War II. After the war, he worked as a teacher, and also joined the Labour Party.

== Career ==
He was elected to Neston Urban District Council in 1949, representing Little Neston. He stood in the 1951 UK general election in the Wirral, taking second place with 34.8% of the vote. That year, he became chair of the Wirral Constituency Labour Party, serving until 1953.

Chrimes stood again in Wirral at the 1955 UK general election, his vote share falling back to 32.6%. From 1955 to 1956 he was chair of the Neston UDC, and he later served a lengthy stint as its leader. At the 1959 UK general election, he switched to contest Manchester Blackley, taking another second place, with a 37.7% share.

In 1974, the Neston UDC became part of Ellesmere Port and Neston Borough Council. Chrimes won the same Little Neston ward, and became deputy leader of the new council, serving under Fred Venables. In recognition of his long service, he was made a freeman of the borough in 1995, while in the 2001 Birthday Honours, he was made a Member of the Order of the British Empire. Venables stood down in 2005, and Chrimes was elected unopposed as his replacement. He retired in 2007, at which point he was the longest-serving councillor in the UK. He stated that he had never taken an allowance for his work, and that his proudest achievement was reducing the level of unemployment in the borough. He was made an honorary alderman.

In 2009, Ellesmere Port and Neston became part of Cheshire West and Chester Council, a change which Chrimes supported. Just before its dissolution, it presented Chrimes with a certificate in recognition of his past service. In 2017, the Mayor of Neston met with him and other surviving members of the Neston UDC.

== Death ==
Chrimes died of pneumonia on 13 September 2021, at the age of 96. He was survived by his wife, Doreen, his son and daughter, and four grandchildren.
