= Listed buildings in Kingsley, Cheshire =

Kingsley is a civil parish in Cheshire West and Chester, England. Other than the village of Kingsley, the parish is entirely rural. It contains 13 buildings that are recorded in the National Heritage List for England as designated listed buildings. Other than the church and its lychgate, and the wall of a former Quaker burial ground, the structures are all related to domestic buildings or farms.

== Key ==
Grade	Criteria
Grade II*	Particularly important buildings of more than special interest.
Grade II	Buildings of national importance and special interest.

== Buildings ==
Name and location	Photograph	Date	Notes	Grade
Crewood Hall; 53.2806°N 2.6519°W	—	Late 16th century	Basically a timber-framed country house, with a two-storey porch added in 1623. Much of it was encased in brick in the 19th century when the house was also extended. It is a two-storey house, consisting of a hall with two cross wings and the porch.	II*
The Croft; 53.2654°N 2.6771°W	—	17th century (probable)	This is a cottage that has been rendered and altered since it was built. It is in one storey, with attics, and has a thatched roof. The windows are casements with dormers in the attics.	II
Manor House Farmhouse; 53.2706°N 2.7068°W		Late 17th century	A brown brick house with blue-brick banding, sandstone quoins, and a slate roof. It is in two storeys and has an attic, a two-storey porch, and a lean-to extension. One of the rooms has oak panelling.	II*
Quaker Meeting House Wall; 53.2676°N 2.7052°W	—	1686	A sandstone wall, formerly surrounding the burial ground of a Quaker meeting house. The meeting house was demolished in 1856, and the wall was rebuilt, incorporating some of the fabric of the meeting house and an inscribed stone.	II
Walls and two bridges to moat, Peel Hall; 53.2746°N 2.6909°W	—	18th century (or earlier)	The walls of the moat, and the bridges, are in sandstone with some brick. The bridge on the southwest side dates probably from the 18th century; that on the southeast side has cast iron posts, and is probably from the 19th century. The moated site is a scheduled monument.	II
Lower House Farmhouse; 53.2749°N 2.6992°W	—	Late 18th century (probable)	A brick house with slate roofs in two storeys plus an attic. It has one horizontally sliding sash window in a gable; the other windows are casements.	II
Castle Hill Farmhouse; 53.2665°N 2.6950°W	—	c. 1800	A two-storey brick building with slate roofs and rusticated quoins. The lintels have keystones and voussoirs, and the windows are sashes.	II
Castle Hill House; 53.2658°N 2.6942°W	—	c. 1800	This is a two-storey house in white-painted brick on a sandstone plinth with a slate roof. Three steps lead up to a door with a Doric pedimented doorcase.	II
Catten Hall Farmhouse; 53.2865°N 2.6752°W		c. 1830	A two-storey brick house with some rendering and rusticated quoins and a slate roof, standing on a sandstone plinth. It has a Doric doorcase with an entablature, and sash windows. The attached L-shaped sandstone farm building is included in the listing.	II
Kingsley Hall; 53.2694°N 2.6738°W	—	c. 1830	A two-storey brick house on a painted stone plinth with a slate roof. The doorcase is Tuscan with an ornate fanlight, and the windows are sashes.	II
St John's Church; 53.2701°N 2.6799°W		1849–50	This was a Commissioners' church designed by George Gilbert Scott. It is constructed in sandstone with slate roofs. Its style is that of the 13th century, with an embraced west steeple.	II
Stables, Crewood Hall; 53.2808°N 2.6521°W	—	Late 19th century	A brick building with tiled roofs. Its features include doors, pitching eyes, and vents that are diamond-shaped or split-diamonds.	II
Lychgate, St John's Church; 53.26998°N 2.67931°W		Late 19th century (probable)	A timber-framed lychgate on a sandstone plinth with a green slate roof.	II

== See also ==
- Listed buildings in Aston-by-Sutton
- Listed buildings in Crowton
- Listed buildings in Frodsham
- Listed buildings in Manley
- Listed buildings in Norley
