= St John the Evangelist's Church, Norley =

Coordinates: 53.2507°N 2.6598°W

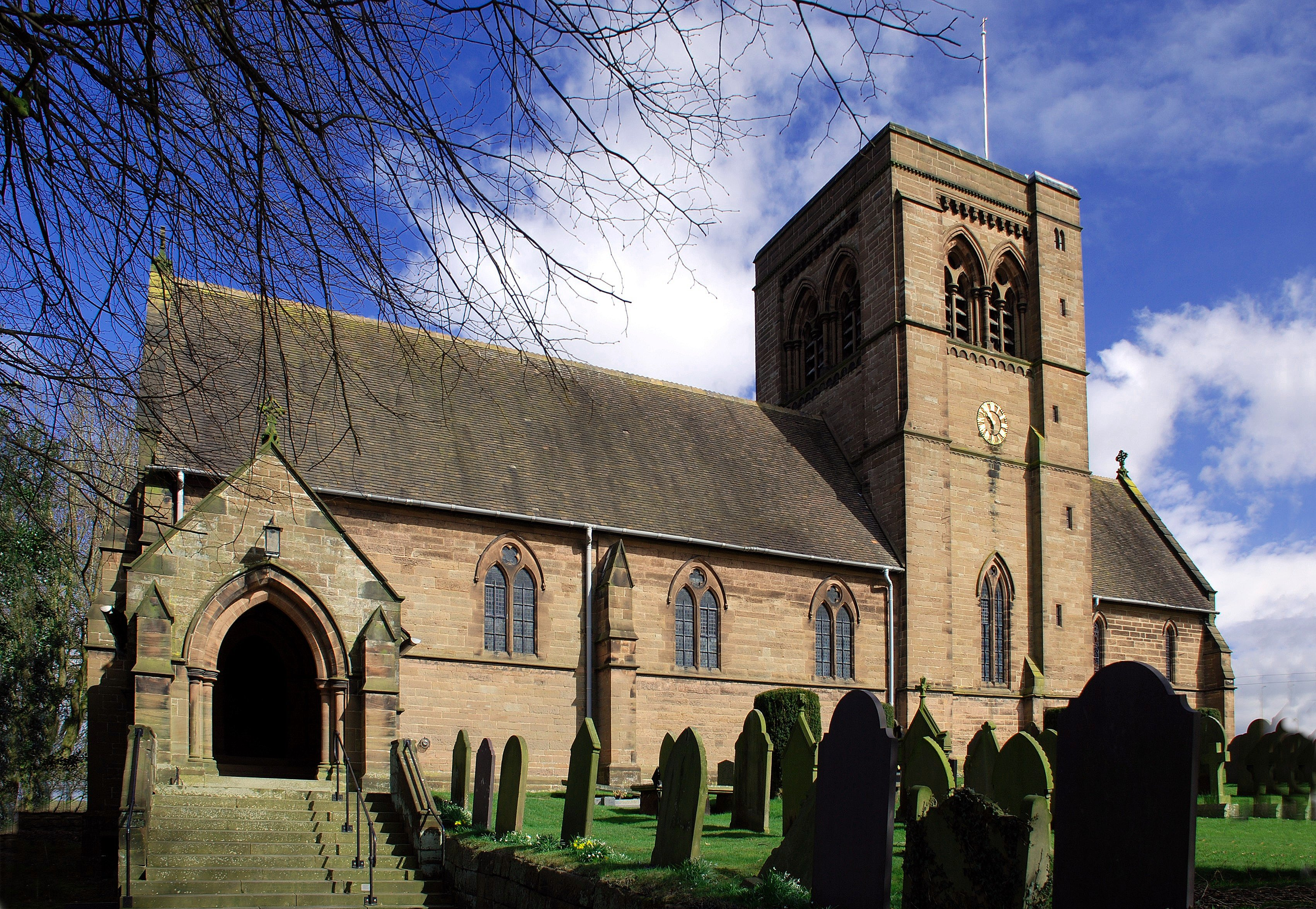
- St John the Evangelist's Church, Norley

- Location in Cheshire
- OS grid reference: SJ 561,728
- Location: Norley, Cheshire
- Country: England
- Denomination: Anglican
- Website: Norley, St John the Evangelist

History
- Status: Parish church
- Dedication: John the Evangelist

Architecture
- Functional status: Active
- Heritage designation: Grade II*
- Designated: 17 April 1986
- Architect: J. L. Pearson
- Architectural type: Church
- Style: Gothic Revival
- Groundbreaking: 1878
- Completed: 1879
- Construction cost: £3,500

Specifications
- Materials: Red ashlar sandstone Red tile roof

Administration
- Province: York
- Diocese: Chester
- Archdeaconry: Chester
- Deanery: Frodsham
- Parish: St John, Norley

St John the Evangelist's Church stands to the west of the village of Norley, Cheshire, England. The church is recorded in the National Heritage List for England as a designated Grade II* listed building. It is an active Anglican parish church in the diocese of Chester, the archdeaconry of Chester and the deanery of Frodsham. Its benefice is combined with those of Christ Church, Crowton, and St John the Evangelist, Kingsley.

== History ==
The first church to be erected on the site was a chapel of ease erected in 1833 and consecrated on 24 February 1835. The present church was built in 1878–79 and designed by J. L. Pearson. The land for the original church had been given by Samuel Woodhouse of Norley Hall. The new church cost £3,500 (equivalent to £380,000 in 2025).

== Architecture ==
=== Exterior ===
The church is built in tooled ashlar red sandstone with a red tile roof. Its style is that of the later 13th century. Its plan consists of a four-bay nave, a north aisle, a two-bay chancel and a vestry, a central tower, a north transept and a south porch which is approached by 11 steps. The nave and the tower have two-light windows. Above the tower window is a clock face and above this is a pair of two-light louvred bell openings. At the top of the tower is a plain parapet. The chancel windows are lancets and at the east end are three tall windows. The window in the north wall of the transept is more ornate than that in the south wall of the tower.

=== Interior ===
In the chancel is a sedilia. The reredos of 1930, the altar of 1937, and screens of 1919 and 1921 were designed by F. H. Crossley. Most of the stained glass was made in the early and mid 20th century by William Morris of Westminster. The west window of the north aisle is dated 1950, and is by Trena Cox. In the transept is a Willis organ, which was restored in 1985 by David Wells. The font is square and probably came from the older church.

== External features ==
In the churchyard is a memorial to the Woodhouse family with an earliest date of 1840. It is constructed in ashlar limestone on a red sandstone base and includes marble plaques. It is a large monument standing about three metres high. On its top is a sarcophagus on claw feet. It is listed at Grade II. The churchyard also contains three war graves, consisting of two soldiers of World War I (at the northeast corner of the church), and one of World War II (west of the church).

== See also ==
- Listed buildings in Norley
- List of new ecclesiastical buildings by J. L. Pearson
