= Boughton Heath =

Coordinates: 53.185°N 02.861°W

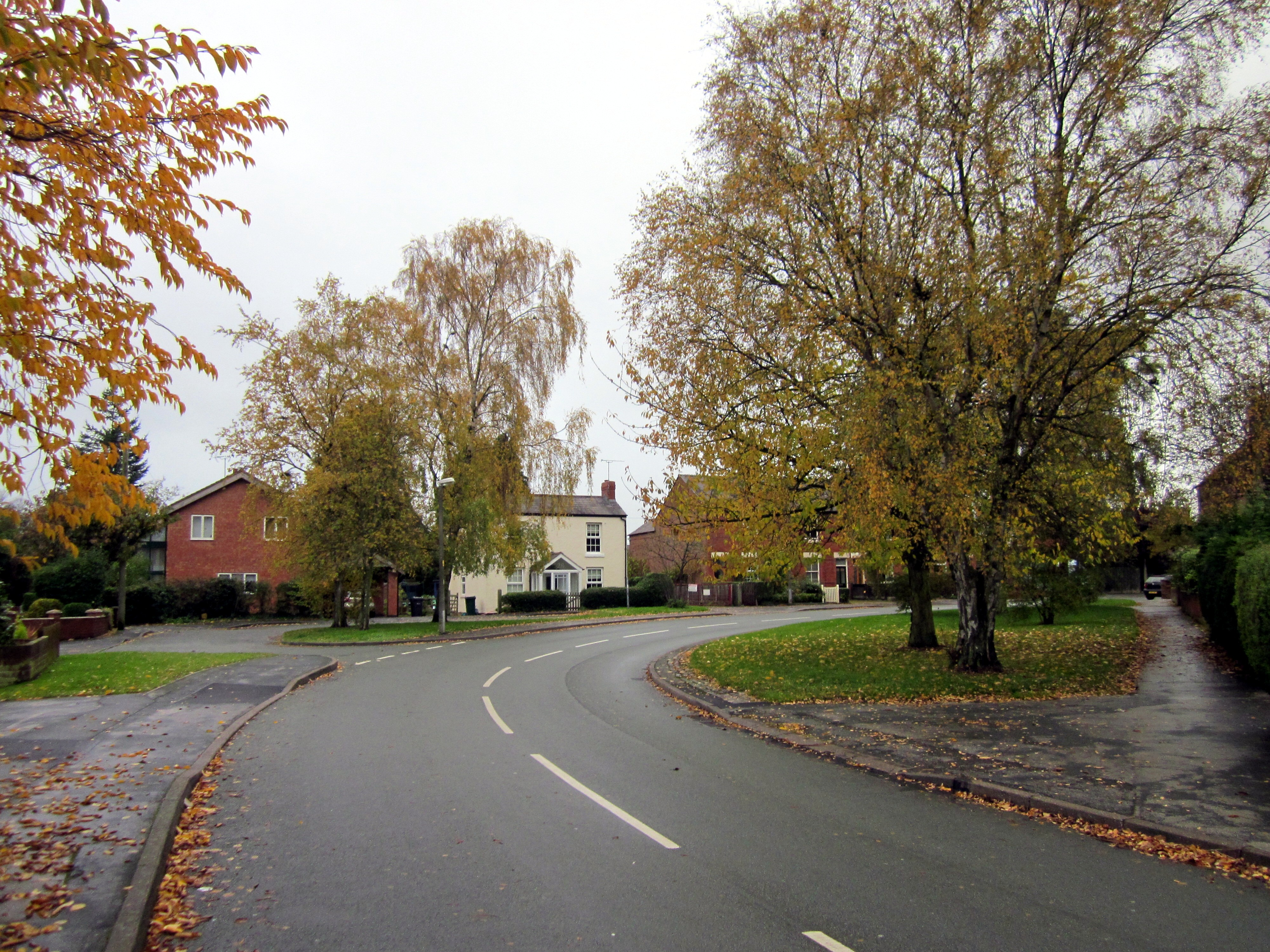
- Heath Lane

- Location within Cheshire
- OS grid reference: SJ4265
- Unitary authority: Cheshire West and Chester
- Ceremonial county: Cheshire
- Region: North West
- Country: England
- Sovereign state: United Kingdom
- Police: Cheshire
- Fire: Cheshire
- Ambulance: North West

Boughton Heath is a village located inside the civil parish Great Boughton in Chester, Cheshire, England.

The village is home to two primary schools, Boughton Heath Academy and Cherry Grove Primary School as well the one secondary school, Bishops' Blue Coat Church of England High School. It also is home to a special school, Dee Banks School.

The Village also has many shops and is home to half of the Caldy Valley Nature Reserve. Other popular sites are the Sandy Lane Aqua Park and The Meadows across the River Dee.
