= Norley Hall =

Country house in Norley, Cheshire, England

Coordinates: 53.25247°N 2.65362°W

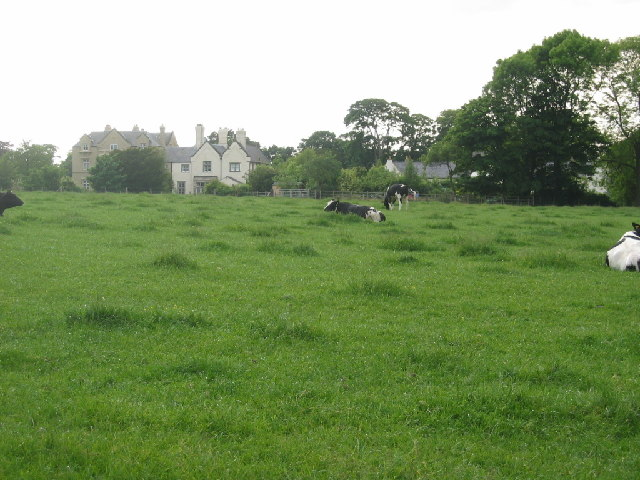
Norley Hall (2005)

Norley Hall is a country house in the village of Norley, Cheshire, England. It was built in about 1500 on the site of an earlier house for the Hall family, enlarged in 1697 for John Hall, rebuilt in 1782 for William Hall, and enlarged again in about 1845 for Samuel Woodhouse, giving it a Tudor appearance. The architect responsible for this latest enlargement was Alfred Bowyer Clayton. The service wing was extended later in the 19th century, and further additions and alterations were carried out during the 20th century, including the division of the building into two houses. The gardens were designed by Edward Kemp. The house is rendered, and has a sandstone ashlar basement, porch and dressings. The roofs are slated. Its plan is irregular. The main block is in two storeys, plus an attic and a basement. On the entrance front is a projecting central gabled bay. There is a single-storey porch with buttresses, pinnacles, a pierced balustrade, and a Tudor arched doorway. On the left side of the house is an octagonal stair turret surmounted by a bellcote with a conical roof. The service wing also has two storeys. The house is recorded in the National Heritage List for England as a designated Grade II listed building.

== See also ==
- Listed buildings in Norley
