= Littleton, Cheshire =

Village in Cheshire, England

Coordinates: 53.194°N 2.84°W

Littleton
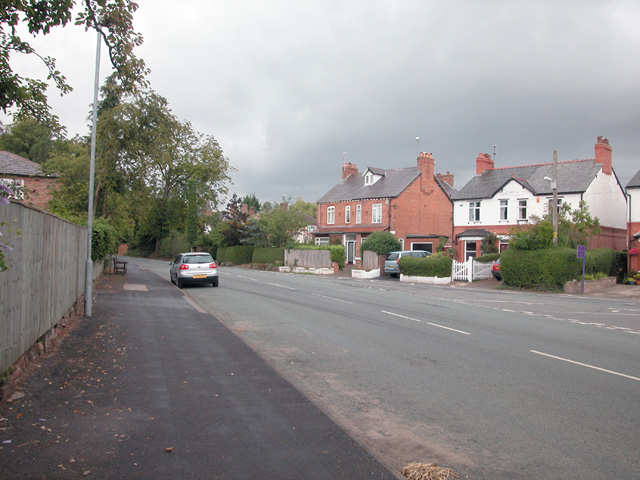
- Littleton

- Location within Cheshire
- Population: 647 (2011 census)
- OS grid reference: SJ440666
- Civil parish: Littleton
- Unitary authority: Cheshire West and Chester
- Ceremonial county: Cheshire
- Region: North West
- Country: England
- Sovereign state: United Kingdom
- Post town: CHESTER
- Postcode district: CH3
- Dialling code: 01244
- Police: Cheshire
- Fire: Cheshire
- Ambulance: North West
- UK Parliament: Chester South and Eddisbury

Littleton is a village and civil parish in the Borough of Cheshire West and Chester and ceremonial county of Cheshire, England. It is near the A51 road, approximately 3 miles (4.8 km) east of Chester.

At the time of the 2001 census the population was 644, increasing to 647 by the 2011 census.

== History ==
The name Littleton derives from the Old English lȳtel (little) and tūn (a settlement or farmstead).

The parish has historically been a little hamlet within the manor and ancient parish of Christleton and has as such been known by the names Parva Cristentona (Little Christleton) in the 12th century and Parva Christleton up until at least 1795. The name Littleton was used in preference to Parva Cristentona in Magna Britannia (Volume 2), circa 1810.

The open land surrounding and within Littleton contains many former marl pits. The marl from the pits was used as an agricultural fertiliser and also as a component in the process of brickmaking, which seems to have been practised locally.

The northern part of the village, along the A51 Tarvin Road, was known as Vicar’s Cross. A stone cross had originally stood near the road until it was demolished by Puritans in 1613. A modern replica has been erected near to the original site. The modern housing estate of Vicars Cross now exists to the west of the village.

== Landmarks ==
The parish contains one building included in the National Heritage List for England and designated by English Heritage as a listed building. This is Hunter's Court, which originated as a barn in the late 17th century, and was later converted into two houses.
