= Cheshire West and Chester =

Borough in England

- Unitary authority area and borough
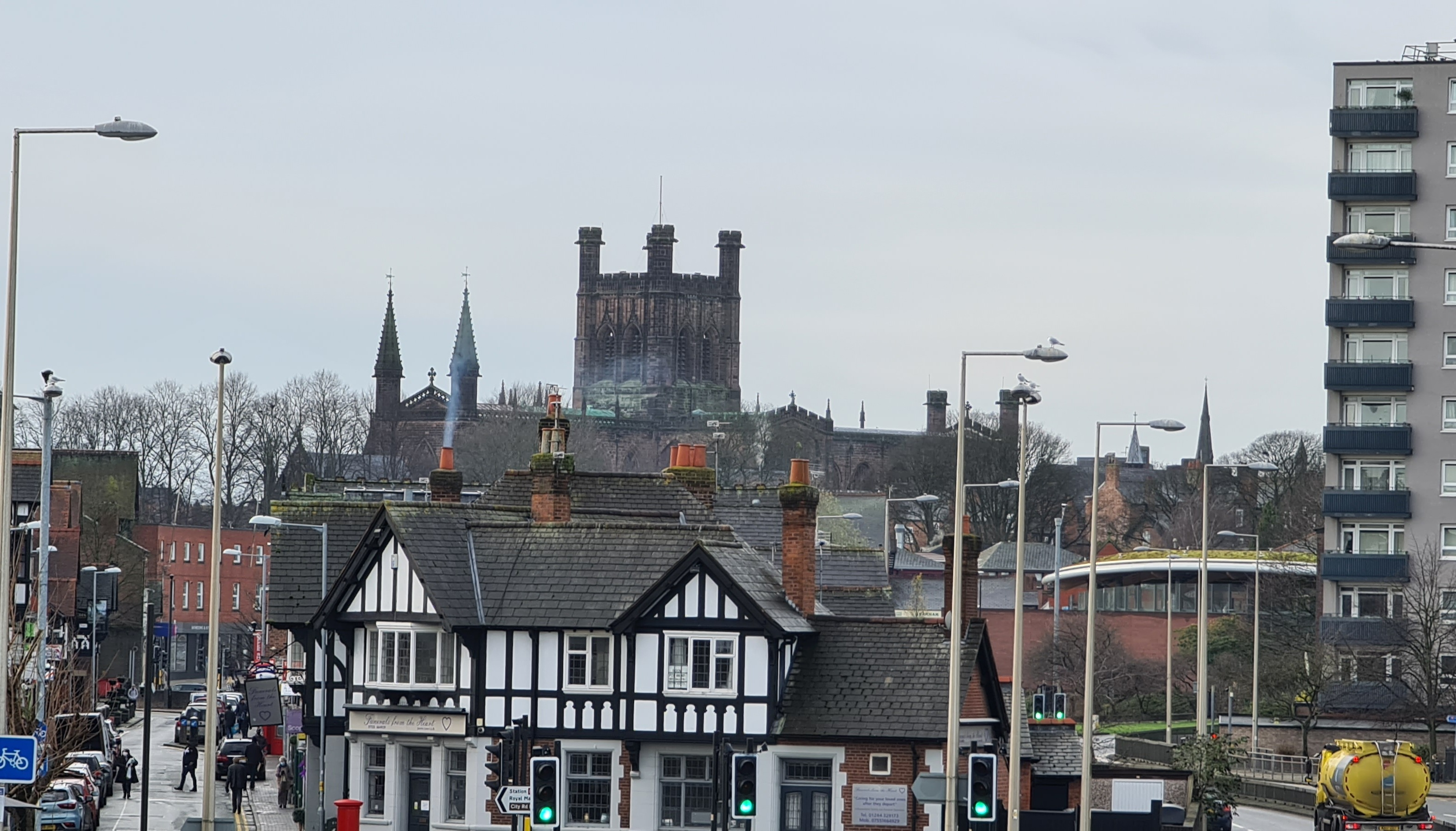
- Chester, the county town of Cheshire and the largest settlement in Cheshire West and Chester

- Cheshire West and Chester shown within Cheshire
- Coordinates: 53.213°N 2.902°W
- Sovereign state: United Kingdom
- Country: England
- Region: North West
- Ceremonial county: Cheshire
- Incorporated: 1 April 2009
- Administrative HQ: The Portal, Ellesmere Port

Government
  - Type: Unitary authority
  - Body: Cheshire West and Chester Council
  - Executive: Leader and cabinet
  - Control: No overall control
  - Leader: Louise Gittins (Lab)
  - Chairman: Robert Bisset (Lab)
  - MPs: Six MPs: Aphra Brandreth (Con); Andrew Cooper (Lab); Samantha Dixon (Lab); Justin Madders (Lab); Esther McVey (Con); Sarah Pochin (Reform)

Area
  - Total: 363 sq mi (941 km^{2})
  - Land: 360 sq mi (920 km^{2})
  - Rank: 31st

Population (2025)
  - Total: 373,951
  - Rank: 25th
  - Density: 1,050/sq mi (406/km^{2})

Ethnicity (2021)
  - Ethnic groups: List: 95.3% White; 2.0% Asian; 1.5% Mixed; 0.6% Black; 0.6% other

Religion (2021)
  - Religion: List: 54.5% Christianity; 37.8% no religion; 1.0% Islam; 0.4% Hinduism; 0.3% Buddhism; 0.1% Judaism; 0.1% Sikhism; 0.3% other; 5.5% not stated
- Time zone: UTC+0 (GMT)
  - Summer (DST): UTC+1 (BST)
- Postcode areas: CH1–4; CH33–34; CH64–66; CW6–10; SY14; WA4–6
- Dialling codes: 01244; 01270; 01477; 0151; 01565; 01606; 01829; 01925; 01928; 01948
- ISO 3166 code: GB-CHW
- GSS code: E06000050
- Website: cheshirewestandchester.gov.uk

Cheshire West and Chester is a unitary authority area with borough status in Cheshire, England. It was established on 1 April 2009 as part of the 2009 local government changes, by virtue of an order under the Local Government and Public Involvement in Health Act 2007. It superseded the boroughs of Ellesmere Port and Neston, Vale Royal and the City of Chester. The remainder of the ceremonial county of Cheshire is composed of Cheshire East, Halton and Warrington. Cheshire West and Chester has three key urban areas: Chester, Ellesmere Port and Northwich/Winsford.

The decision to create the Cheshire West and Chester unitary authority was announced on 25 July 2007 following a consultation period, in which a proposal to create a single Cheshire unitary authority was rejected.

== Governance ==
The council is a unitary authority, being a district council which also performs the functions of a county council. Full council meetings are held at Wyvern House in Winsford and the council has its main offices at The Portal in Ellesmere Port.

=== Subdivisions ===
As of 2019, the borough is divided into forty-five wards:

- Blacon
- Central and Grange
- Chester City and The Garden Quarter
- Christleton and Huntington
- Davenham, Moulton and Kingsmead
- Farndon
- Frodsham
- Gowy Rural
- Great Boughton
- Handbridge Park
- Hartford and Greenbank
- Helsby
- Lache
- Ledsham and Manor
- Little Neston
- Malpas
- Marbury
- Neston
- Netherpool
- Newton and Hoole
- Northwich Leftwich
- Northwich Winnington and Castle
- Northwich Witton
- Parkgate
- Rudheath
- Sandstone
- Saughall and Mollington
- Shakerley
- Strawberry
- Sutton Villages
- Tarporley
- Tarvin and Kelsall
- Tattenhall
- Upton
- Weaver and Cuddington
- Westminster
- Whitby Groves
- Whitby Park
- Willaston and Thornton
- Winsford Dene
- Winsford Gravel
- Winsford Over and Verdin
- Winsford Swanlow
- Winsford Wharton
- Wolverham

There are ninety-seven parish councils in the borough, despite there being a total of 166 civil parishes before a community governance review was undertaken by the borough council in 2014 under section 82 of the Local Government and Public Involvement in Health Act 2007.

Subdivisions in Cheshire West and Chester
Ward	Civil parishes	House of Commons constituency	Population (ward)	Area (ward, km^{2})	Density (ward, /km^{2})	Population (civil parish)	Area (civil parish, km^{2})	Density (civil parish, /km^{2})	Parish council website	Postcode(s)	Dialling code
Blacon (E05012209)	Unparished areas (E43000272)	City of Chester	13,719	4.532	3,027	129,607	81.13	1,598		CH1	01244
Central and Grange (E05012210)	Unparished areas (E43000272)	Ellesmere Port and Neston	11,038	3.146	3,509	129,607	81.13	1,598		CH65, CH66	0151
Chester City and the Garden Quarter (E05012211)	Unparished areas (E43000272)	City of Chester	18,164	4.307	4,217	129,607	81.13	1,598		CH1, CH2, CH3	01244
Chester City and the Garden Quarter (E05012211)	Chester Castle (E04011062)	City of Chester	18,164	4.307	4,217	0	0.0433	0		CH1	01244
Christleton and Huntington (E05012212)	Christleton (E04012578)	City of Chester	11,103	55.46	200.2	2,454	6.154	398.8	Christleton Parish Council	CH3	01244
Christleton and Huntington (E05012212)	Eaton and Eccleston (E04012584)	City of Chester	11,103	55.46	200.2	246	10.72	22.95	Eaton and Eccleston Parish Council	CH4	01244
Christleton and Huntington (E05012212)	Huntington (E04011117)	City of Chester	11,103	55.46	200.2	4,134	5.855	706	Huntington Parish Council	CH3	01244
Christleton and Huntington (E05012212)	Littleton (E04012550)	City of Chester	11,103	55.46	200.2	672	1.111	604.6	Littleton Parish Council	CH3	01244
Christleton and Huntington (E05012212)	Poulton and Pulford (E04012585)	City of Chester	11,103	55.46	200.2	607	10.46	58.06	Poulton and Pulford Parish Council	CH4	01244
Christleton and Huntington (E05012212)	Rowton (E04012557)	City of Chester	11,103	55.46	200.2	460	2.389	192.5	Rowton Parish Council	CH3	01244
Christleton and Huntington (E05012212)	Waverton (E04012580)	Eddisbury	11,103	55.46	200.2	1,497	5.973	250.6	Waverton Parish Council	CH3	01244
Davenham, Moulton and Kingsmead (E05012213)	Bostock (E04011049)	Eddisbury	10,752	16.37	656.9	201	4.526	44.41	Bostock Parish Council	CW10	01606
Davenham, Moulton and Kingsmead (E05012213)	Davenham (E04012536)	Eddisbury	10,752	16.37	656.9	2,897	8.224	352.3	Davenham Parish Council	CW9	01606
Davenham, Moulton and Kingsmead (E05012213)	Kingsmead (E04012165)	Weaver Vale	10,752	16.37	656.9	4,935	1.357	3,638	Kingsmead Parish Council	CW9	01606
Davenham, Moulton and Kingsmead (E05012213)	Moulton (E04011144)	Eddisbury	10,752	16.37	656.9	2,719	2.262	1,202	Moulton Parish Council	CW9	01606
Farndon (E05012214)	Aldersey (E04011034)	Eddisbury	4,576	72.98	62.7	118	9.001	13.11	Coddington and District Parish Council	CH3	01829
Farndon (E05012214)	Aldford and Saighton (E04012566)	City of Chester/Eddisbury	4,576	72.98	62.7	469	19.05	24.62	Aldford and Saighton Parish Council	CH3	01244
Farndon (E05012214)	Barton (E04011046)	Eddisbury	4,576	72.98	62.7	211	5.92	35.64	Coddington and District Parish Council	SY14	01829
Farndon (E05012214)	Carden (E04012532)	Eddisbury	4,576	72.98	62.7	No data	3.667	No data	Coddington and District Parish Council	CH3	01829
Farndon (E05012214)	Churton (E04012579)	Eddisbury	4,576	72.98	62.7	351	8.609	40.77	Churton Parish Council	CH3	01829
Farndon (E05012214)	Clutton (E04012533)	Eddisbury	4,576	72.98	62.7	357	5.91	60.39	Coddington and District Parish Council	CH3	01829
Farndon (E05012214)	Coddington (E04011075)	Eddisbury	4,576	72.98	62.7	No data	5.763	No data	Coddington and District Parish Council	CH3	01829
Farndon (E05012214)	Farndon (E04012581)	Eddisbury	4,576	72.98	62.7	2,096	4.324	484.7	Farndon Parish Council	CH3	01829
Farndon (E05012214)	Shocklach Oviatt and District (E04012576)	Eddisbury	4,576	72.98	62.7	298	15.33	19.44	Shocklach Oviatt and District Parish Council	SY14	01829
Farndon (E05012214)	Stretton (E04011171)	Eddisbury	4,576	72.98	62.7	No data	3.788	No data	Coddington and District Parish Council	SY14	01829
Farndon (E05012214)	Tilston (E04012587)	Eddisbury	4,576	72.98	62.7	662	4.835	136.9	Tilston Parish Council	SY14	01829
Frodsham (E05012215)	**Frodsham** (E04012539)	Weaver Vale	9,231	21.26	434.3	9,231	21.26	434.3	Frodsham Town Council	WA6	01928
Gowy Rural (E05012216)	Barrow (E04011045)	Eddisbury	9,213	49.06	187.8	943	12.33	76.49	Barrow Parish Council	CH3	01829
Gowy Rural (E05012216)	Croughton		9,213	49.06	187.8	No data	1.140	No data		CH2	01244
Gowy Rural (E05012216)	Elton	Ellesmere Port and Neston	9,213	49.06	187.8	3,513	4.614	761.3		CH2	01928
Gowy Rural (E05012216)	Guilden Sutton	City of Chester	9,213	49.06	187.8	1,484	3.963	374.5		CH3	01244
Gowy Rural (E05012216)	Ince		9,213	49.06	187.8						
Gowy Rural (E05012216)	Mickle Trafford and District		9,213	49.06	187.8						
Gowy Rural (E05012216)	Stoak		9,213	49.06	187.8						
Gowy Rural (E05012216)	Thornton-le-Moors		9,213	49.06	187.8						
Grange	Ellesmere Port	Ellesmere Port and Neston									
Great Boughton	Great Boughton	City of Chester									
Handbridge Park	Chester	City of Chester									
Hartford and Greenbank	Hartford	Weaver Vale									
Hartford and Greenbank	**Northwich**	Weaver Vale									
Helsby	Helsby	Weaver Vale									
Hoole	Chester	City of Chester									
Kingsley	Aston	Weaver Vale									
Kingsley	Crowton	Weaver Vale									
Kingsley	Kingsley	Weaver Vale									
Kingsley	Norley	Weaver Vale									
Kingsley	Sutton	Weaver Vale									
Lache	Chester	City of Chester									
Ledsham and Manor	Ellesmere Port	Ellesmere Port and Neston									
Little Neston and Burton	**Neston**	Ellesmere Port and Neston									
Little Neston and Burton	Puddington	City of Chester									
Malpas	Agden	Eddisbury									
Malpas	Chidlow	Eddisbury									
Malpas	Chorlton	Eddisbury									
Malpas	Cuddington	Eddisbury									
Malpas	Malpas	Eddisbury									
Malpas	No Man's Heath and District	Eddisbury									
Malpas	Threapwood	Eddisbury									
Malpas	Tushingham-cum-Grindley, Macefen and Bradley	Eddisbury									
Malpas	Wigland	Eddisbury									
Marbury	Anderton with Marbury	Tatton									
Marbury	Antrobus	Tatton									
Marbury	Barnton	Tatton									
Marbury	Comberbach	Tatton									
Marbury	Great Budworth	Tatton									
Marbury	Little Leigh	Tatton									
Marbury	Marston	Tatton									
Marbury	Whitley	Tatton									
Marbury	Wincham	Tatton									
Neston	**Neston**	Ellesmere Port and Neston									
Netherpool	Ellesmere Port	Ellesmere Port and Neston									
Newton	Chester	City of Chester									
Parkgate	**Neston**	Ellesmere Port and Neston									
Rossmore	Ellesmere Port	Ellesmere Port and Neston									
Saughall and Mollington	Backford	City of Chester									
Saughall and Mollington	Capenhurst	City of Chester									
Saughall and Mollington	Lea-by-Backford	City of Chester									
Saughall and Mollington	Ledsham	City of Chester									
Saughall and Mollington	Mollington	City of Chester									
Saughall and Mollington	Saughall and Shotwick Park	City of Chester									
Shakerley	Allostock	Tatton									
Shakerley	Byley	Tatton									
Shakerley	Lach Dennis	Tatton									
Shakerley	Lostock Gralam	Tatton									
Shakerley	Sproston	Tatton									
St Paul's	Ellesmere Port	Ellesmere Port and Neston									
Strawberry	Ellesmere Port	Ellesmere Port and Neston									
Sutton	Ellesmere Port	Ellesmere Port and Neston									
Tarporley	Little Budworth	Eddisbury									
Tarporley	Rushton	Eddisbury									
Tarporley	Tarporley	Eddisbury									
Tarporley	Utkinton	Eddisbury									
Tarvin and Kelsall	Clotton Hoofield	Eddisbury									
Tarvin and Kelsall	Delamere and Oakmere	Eddisbury									
Tarvin and Kelsall	Duddon and Burton	Eddisbury									
Tarvin and Kelsall	Kelsall	Eddisbury									
Tarvin and Kelsall	Tarvin	Eddisbury									
Tarvin and Kelsall	Willington	Eddisbury									
Tattenhall	Beeston	Eddisbury									
Tattenhall	Broxton	Eddisbury									
Tattenhall	Burwardsley	Eddisbury									
Tattenhall	Chowley	Eddisbury									
Tattenhall	Duckington	Eddisbury									
Tattenhall	Golborne David	Eddisbury									
Tattenhall	Handley	Eddisbury									
Tattenhall	Hargrave and Huxley	Eddisbury									
Tattenhall	Harthill	Eddisbury									
Tattenhall	Tattenhall and District	Eddisbury									
Tattenhall	Tiverton and Tilstone Fearnall	Eddisbury									
Upton	Bache	City of Chester									
Upton	Moston	City of Chester									
Upton	Upton-by-Chester	City of Chester									
Weaver and Cuddington	Acton Bridge	Weaver Vale									
Weaver and Cuddington	Cuddington	Eddisbury									
Weaver and Cuddington	Dutton	Weaver Vale									
Weaver and Cuddington	Weaverham	Weaver Vale									
Whitby	Ellesmere Port	Ellesmere Port and Neston									
Willaston and Thornton	Ellesmere Port	Ellesmere Port and Neston									
Winnington and Castle	**Northwich**	Weaver Vale									
Winsford Over and Verdin	Whitegate and Marton	Weaver Vale									
Winsford Over and Verdin	**Winsford**	Eddisbury									
Winsford Swanlow and Dene	Darnhall	Eddisbury									
Winsford Swanlow and Dene	**Winsford**	Eddisbury									
Winsford Wharton	Stanthorne and Wimboldsley	Eddisbury									
Winsford Wharton	**Winsford**	Eddisbury									
Witton and Rudheath	**Northwich**	Weaver Vale									
Witton and Rudheath	Rudheath	Tatton									
Footnotes: Geographic codes, area and population statistics

Notes

1. 3: Civil parishes highlighted in bold have unilaterally declared town status under section 12A of the Local Government Act 1972.

=== Members of Parliament ===
**Chester North and Neston**
Samantha Dixon
Labour

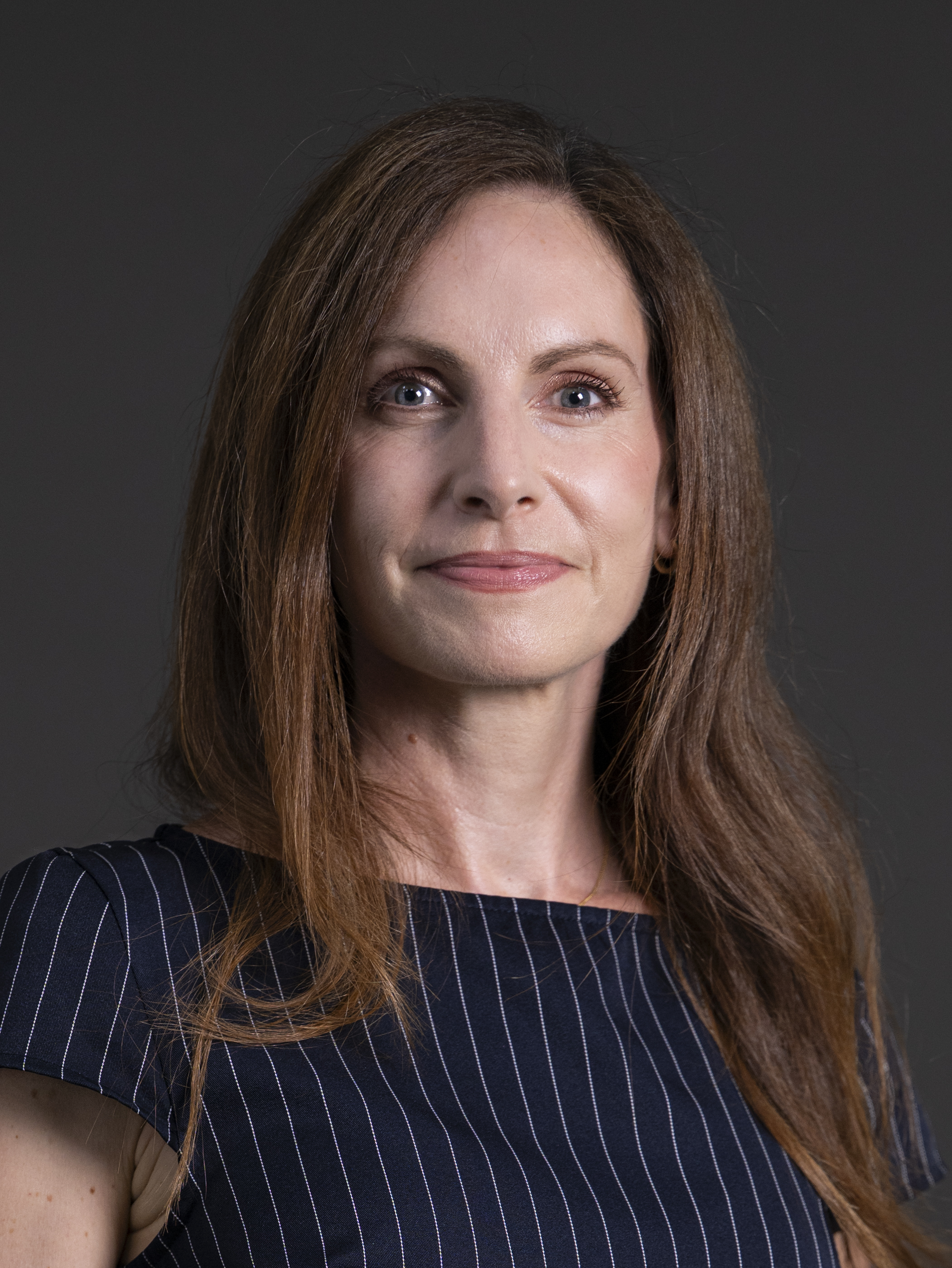
**Chester South and Eddisbury**
Aphra Brandreth
Conservative

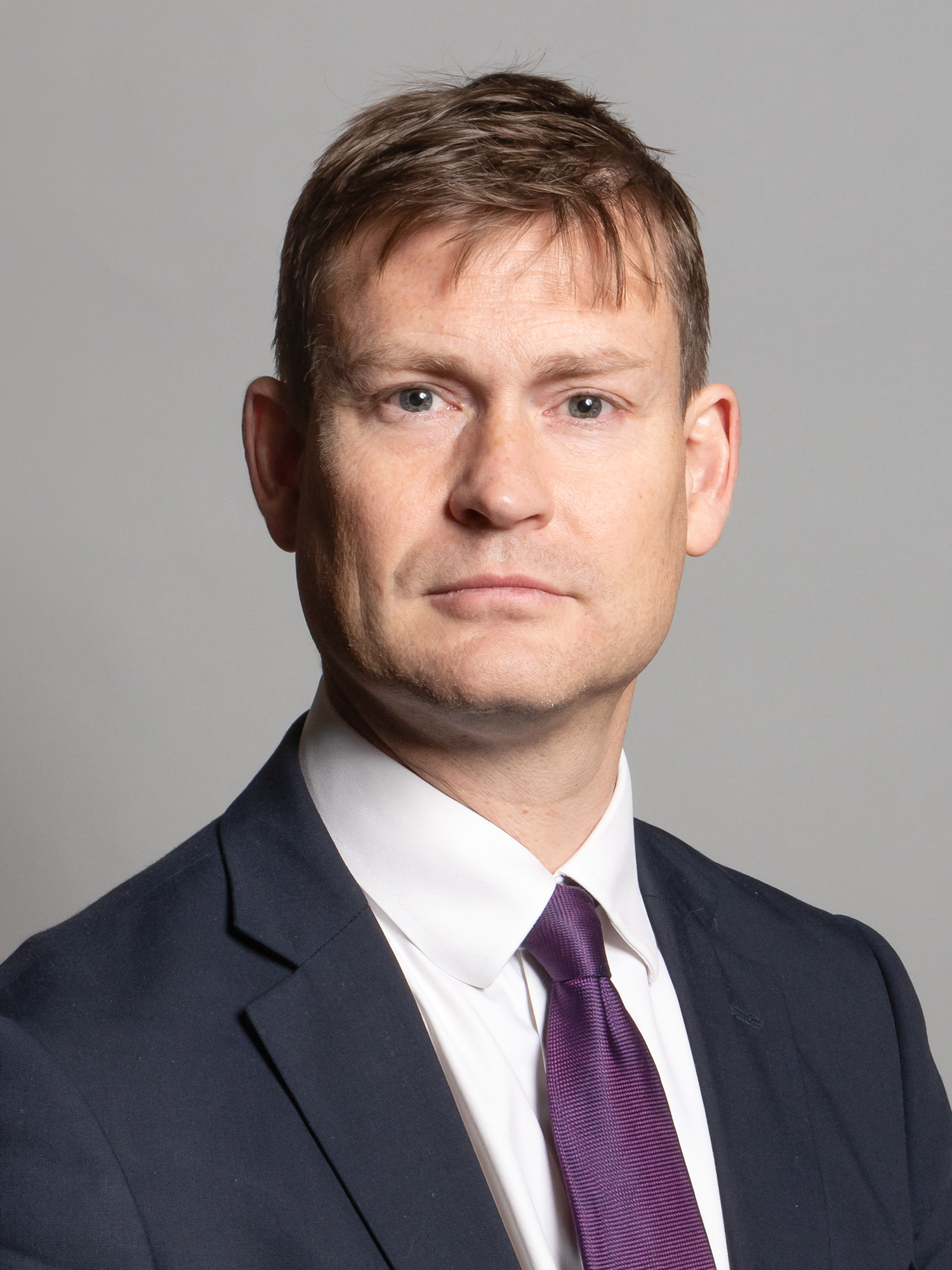
**Ellesmere Port and Bromborough**
Justin Madders
Labour

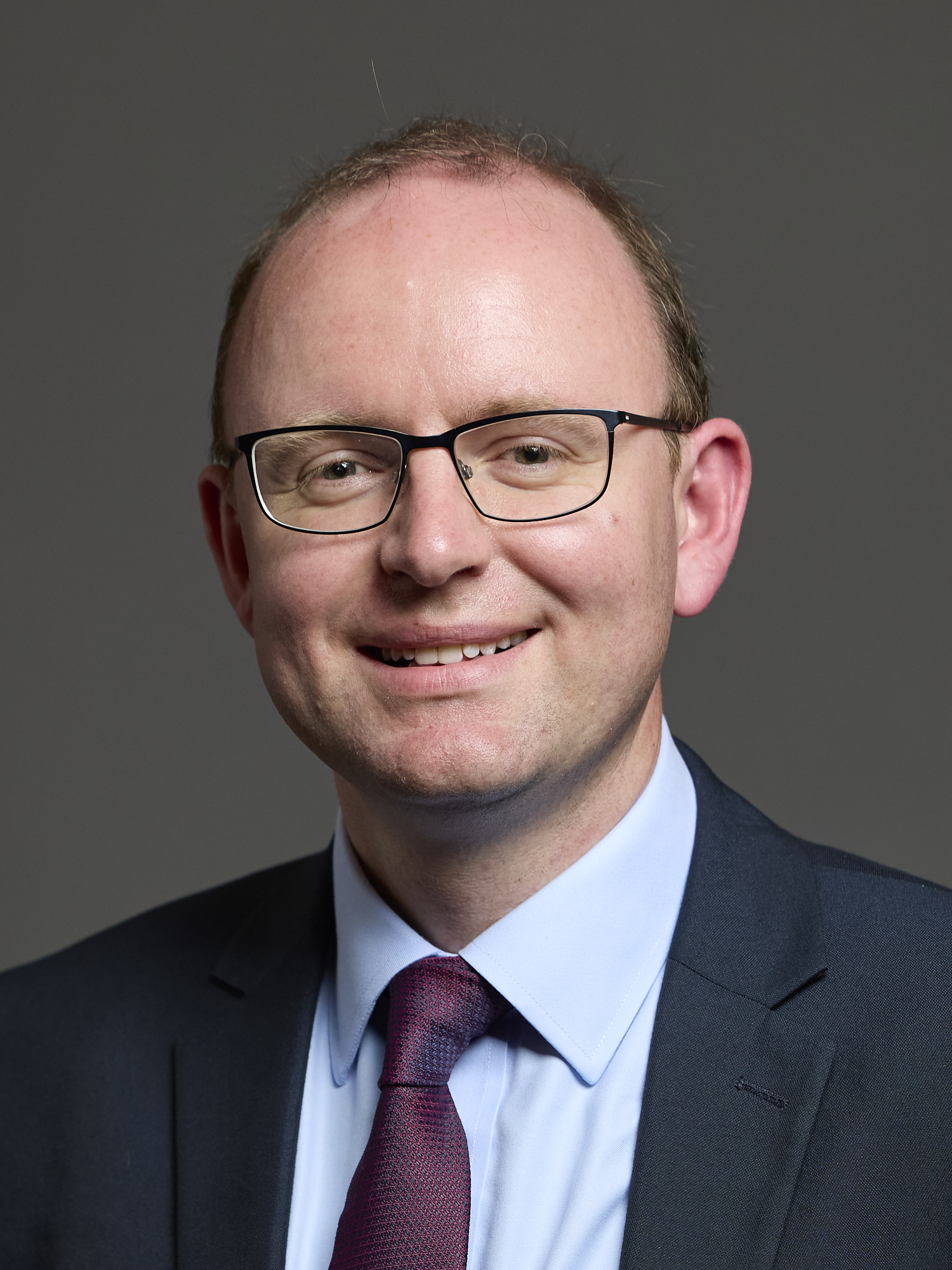
**Mid Cheshire**
Andrew Cooper
Labour

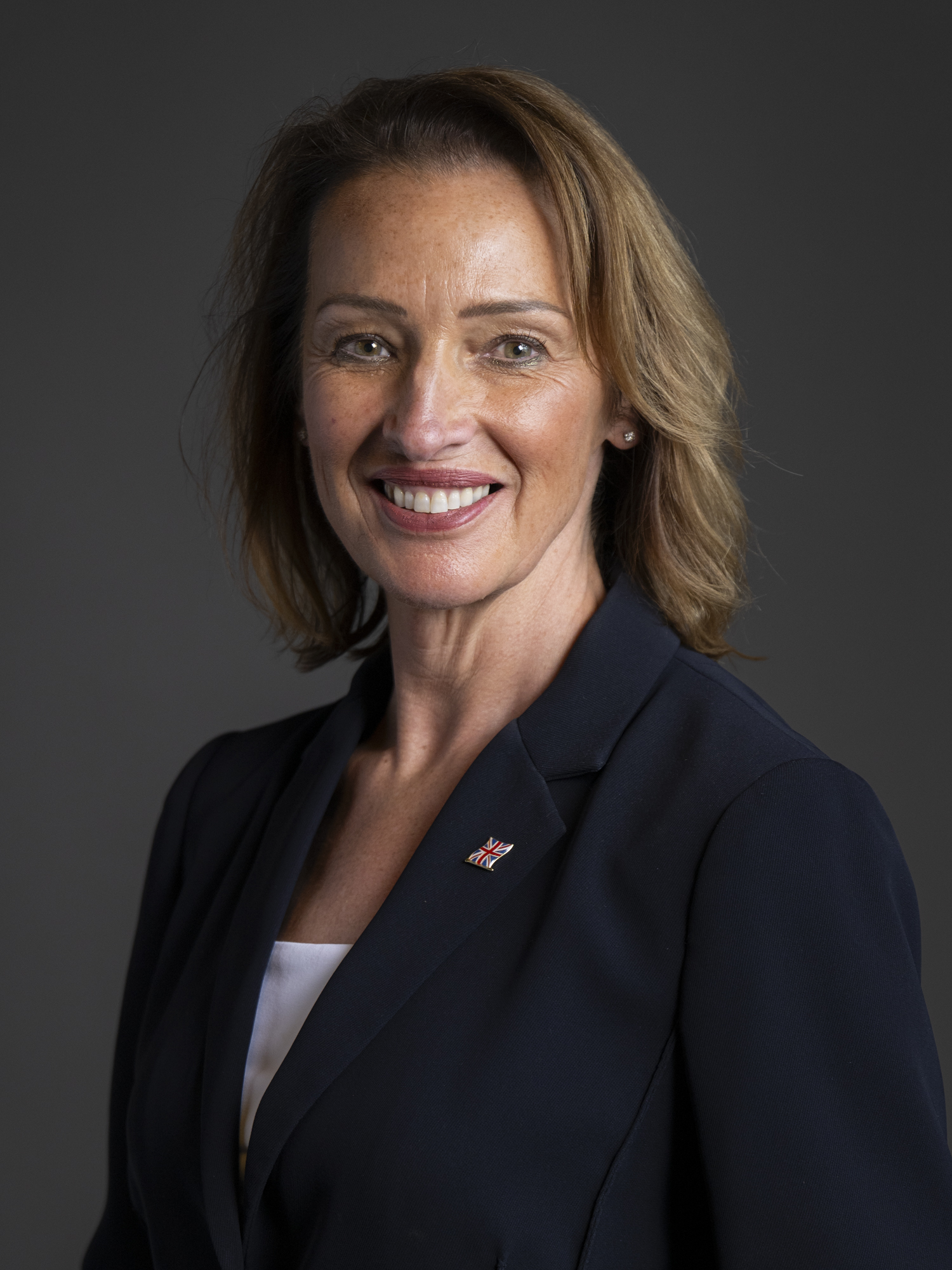
**Runcorn and Helsby**
Sarah Pochin
Reform UK

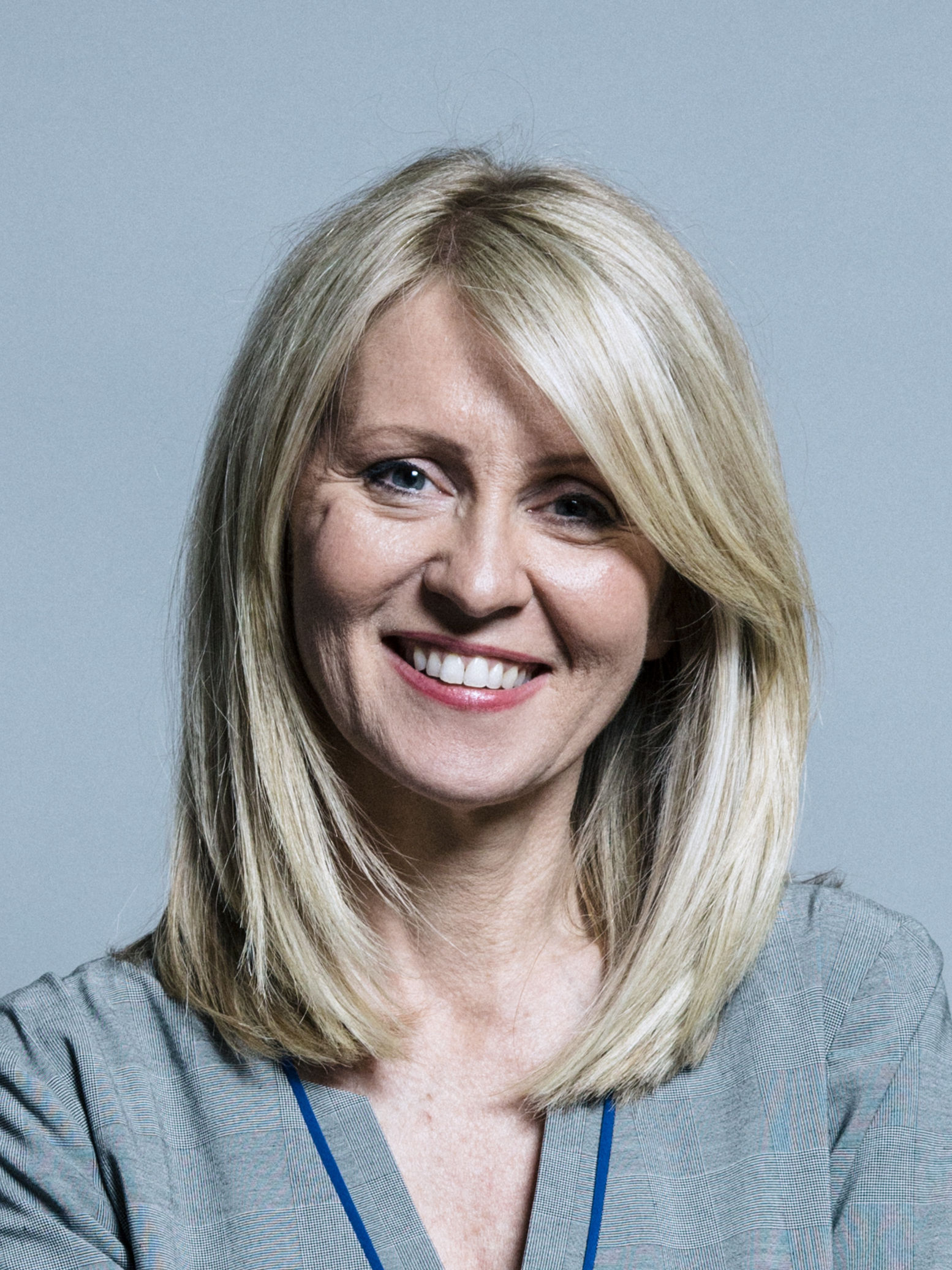
**Tatton**
Esther McVey
Conservative

== Demography ==
=== Ethnicity ===
Ethnicity in Cheshire West and Chester (2021)
Ethnicity	Percent(%)
White	95.3%
Asian	2.0%
Mixed	1.5%
Black	0.6%
Other	0.6%

In line with nearly every local government district in England and Wales, the majority of the population describe themselves as 'white'. The exact figure – 95.3% – is comparable with metropolitan counties such as Merseyside, non-metropolitan counties such as Cumbria and principal areas throughout Wales. This would suggest that the figure is not a significant outlier nationwide.

The next largest ethnic group in the borough is Asian, who along with other ethnic minorities are supported by the Cheshire Asian & Minority Communities Council, a registered charity headquartered in Chester.

=== Religion ===
Religion in Cheshire West and Chester (2021)
Religion	Percent(%)
Christian	54.5%
No religion	37.8%
Undeclared	5.5%
Muslim	1.0%
Hindu	0.4%
Other	0.3%
Buddhist	0.3%
Jewish	0.1%
Sikh	0.1%

The main religion in Cheshire West and Chester is Christianity, with a percentage figure above the average for England (46.3%, 2021). The single largest church is the Church of England, with the borough being served by the Chester Archdeaconry, with six deaneries and an average of twenty parish churches in each deanery. Roman Catholicism also has a significant presence across the borough, with all its churches located in the Diocese of Shrewsbury.

Methodist churches in the borough form groups averaging ten, known as 'circuits' (the four in Cheshire West and Chester are all part of the Chester and Stoke-on-Trent District). More marginal churches include Assemblies of God, Baptist Union, Elim Pentecostal, United Reformed and the English Presbyterian Church of Wales in Chester.

Aside from churches, there are two mosques in Cheshire West and Chester – one each in Chester and Ellesmere Port – which were subjected to property theft and racially aggravated disorder respectively in 2014.

== Geography ==
Neighbouring council areas
Local authority	In relation to the district
City of Liverpool	North (over the river)
Halton	North
Warrington	North east
Cheshire East	East
Shropshire	South
Wrexham	South west
Flintshire	West
Wirral	North west

=== Local nature reserves ===
Cheshire West and Chester Council maintains six Local Nature Reserves: Burton Mill Wood, Helsby Quarry, Marshall's Arm, Rivacre Valley, Stanney Wood, and Whitby Park.

== Transport ==
=== Air ===
There are no passenger airports in the borough; only a grass airfield exists in Little Budworth, with the nearest being Liverpool John Lennon Airport and Manchester Airport.

=== Cycling ===
National routes which pass through the borough include NCR5, NCR45 (Mercian Way), NCR56, NCR562, NCR563, NCR568 and NCR573. Regional routes include 70 (Cheshire Cycleway) and 71.

Three disused railways in the borough have been converted to off-road cycleways, including:

- Birkenhead Railway: Contains sections of NCR56 and the Wirral Circular Trail and is now called Wirral Way.
- Chester & Connah's Quay Railway: Contains a section of NCR5 and is now called Chester Millennium Greenway.
- Winsford and Over Branch Line: Contains a section of regional route 71 and is now called Whitegate Way.

The Shropshire Union Canal towpath between Waverton and the National Waterways Museum is paved with asphalt; it is a shared-use route between cyclists and pedestrians for a distance of 12.5 miles (20.1 km).

In 2009, Chester was awarded the status of Cycling Town by Cycling England. To reflect this, a series of colour-coded signposted routes around the city were devised in 2012. The total length of new signposted routes created by the project was 38 miles (61 km), bringing the overall total in the borough to 312.5 miles (502.9 km). The total funding received from the cycling town project, which ended in 2011 when Cycling England was disbanded, was £4.4 million. A similar network of over 30 miles (48 km) of cycle routes branded the Ellesmere Port Grenway has been proposed by the town's development board.

=== Park and Ride ===
Chester has four park and ride sites located adjacent to radial routes on the city's outskirts: Boughton Heath, Sealand Road, Upton and Wrexham Road; they run on two lines which intersect at Chester Bus Interchange. A fifth site is proposed near Hoole Village.

Chester Park and Ride services
Route	Terminus	Intermediate stop	Chester city centre				Intermediate stop	Terminus
Blue (PR1)	Upton (Zoo)	Countess of Chester Hospital	Delamere Street	Chester Bus Interchange	Foregate Street	Pepper Street	Grosvenor Road	Wrexham Road
Green (PR2)	Sealand Road	Sealand Road (Greyhound Park)	Canal Street	Chester Bus Interchange	Foregate Street		Boughton	Boughton Heath

Hooton station is designated as a park and ride facility for railway services on the Wirral Line; it contains a 418-space car park.

=== Railway ===
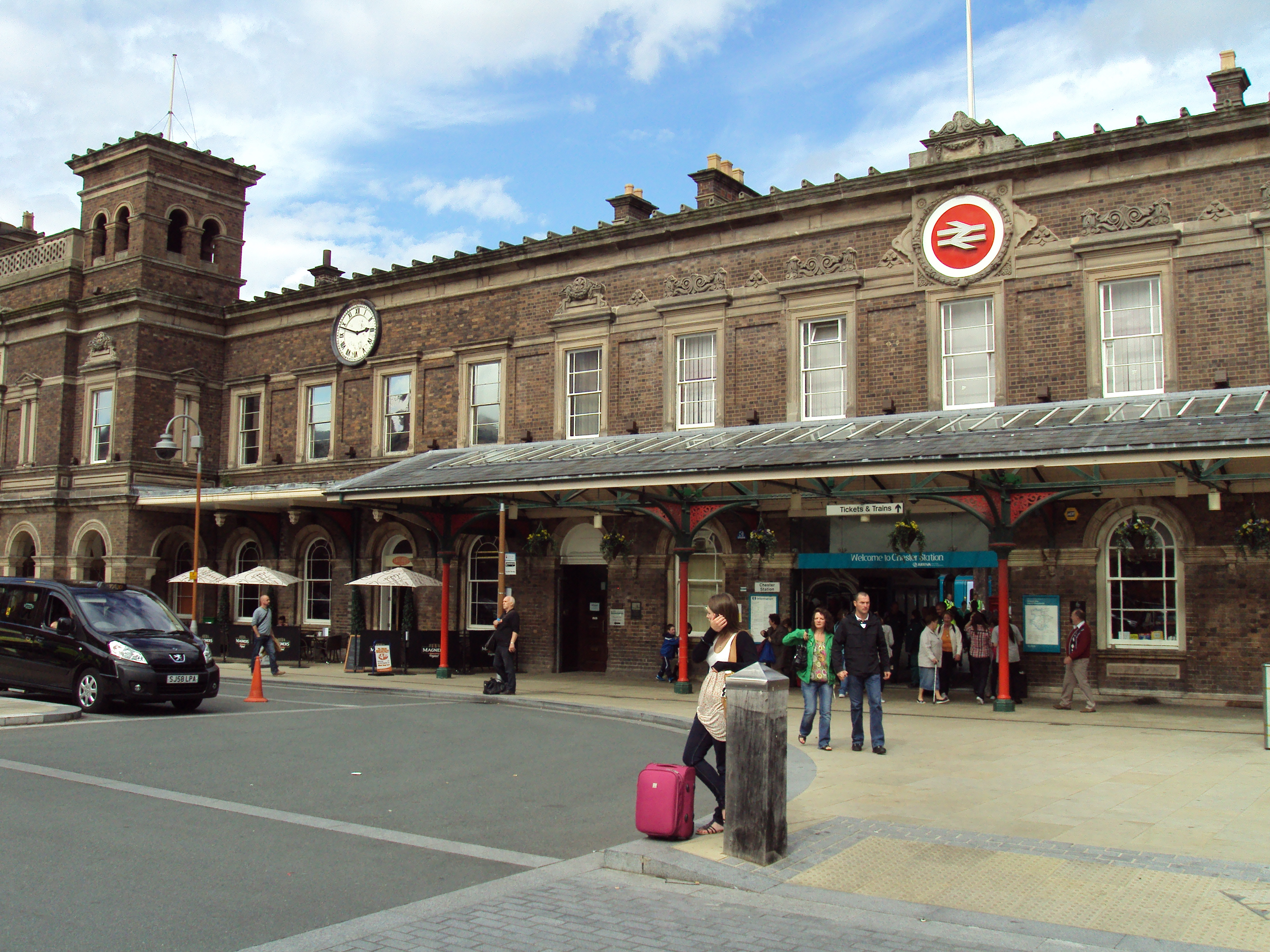
Chester railway station entrance

Chester railway station is the hub of the railway network in the borough, with around 4.7 million passengers annually. Passenger numbers doubled to this figure in the ten years to 2015, making the station the eighth-busiest in North West England.

Railway lines, and their associated train operating companies in the borough, include:

- Borderlands line: Services between Bidston and Wrexham Central are provided by Transport for Wales Rail and call at Neston.
- Chester–Warrington line: Includes stops at Frodsham and Helsby, with services provided by Northern Trains and Transport for Wales Rail.
- Ellesmere Port to Warrington Line (Northern): includes stops at Stanlow & Thornton and Ince & Elton before meeting the Chester-Manchester Line near Helsby; it is operated by Northern Trains according to a Department for Transport-set minimum service pattern.
- Mid-Cheshire line: Leaves the Chester–Warrington line near Mickle Trafford and includes stops at Cuddington, Delamere, Greenbank, Lostock Gralam, Mouldsworth and Northwich, with services between Chester and Manchester Piccadilly provided by Northern Trains. A single-track railway exists between Northwich and Sandbach, but it is only used for freight.
- North Wales Main Line: Services between Crewe and Holyhead are provided by Avanti West Coast and Transport for Wales Rail, and call at Chester.
- Shrewsbury to Chester Line (InterCity West Coast and Wales & Borders): The section between Wrexham and Chester is currently in the process of being reinstated as a two-track railway under the direction of the Welsh Government. Services are provided by Transport for Wales and Avanti West Coast.
- West Coast Main Line (InterCity West Coast): aside from stops at Winsford, Hartford and Acton Bridge, the branch line to Liverpool Lime Street diverges at Weaver Junction – the oldest of its type in Great Britain. It is currently operated by Avanti West Coast, however High Speed 2 services to Liverpool using classic compatible trains are proposed to run along this section of the line.
- Wirral Line (Merseyrail): Chester is one of the terminus stations of the line which loops clockwise around Liverpool city centre in a tunnel. The line includes stops at Bache, Capenhurst and Hooton, with a branch line from the latter running to another terminus at Ellesmere Port, with stops at Little Sutton and Overpool. The line is operated by Merseyrail with this line and the WCML being the only two electrified railways in the borough.
Location of railway stations in Cheshire West and Chester.
Turquoise: Transport for Wales stations
Green: West Midlands Trains stations
Yellow: Merseyrail stations
Blue: Northern stations

==== Current and proposed improvements ====
The sections of railway between Chester–Stockport and Chester–Warrington Bank Quay are proposed for electrification during the period 2019–2024.

=== Road ===
Motorways and numbered roads in Cheshire West and Chester
Motorways	A roads	B roads
M6 motorway M53 motorway M56 motorway	(Route); (Route); (Route); (Route); (Route); (Route); (Route); (Route); (Route); (Route); (Route); (Route)	B5069; B5074; B5075; B5081; B5082; B5130; B5132; B5133; B5134; B5135; B5136; B5142; B5144; B5151; B5152; B5153; B5309; B5355; B5391; B5393; B5394; B5395; B5445; B5463

A556 west of Northwich looking towards Sandiway

Motorways and primary routes in the borough which are maintained by National Highways (trunk roads de jure) include the M6, M53, M56, A55, A483, A494, A550 and a short section of the A41 in Hooton. Other primary routes which are maintained by the council (principal roads de jure) include the A41, A49, A51, A54, A56, A483, A530, A533, A534, A556, A5115, A5116, A5117 and A5268.

Chester and Ellesmere Port – both primary route destinations – form the hub of the road network in Cheshire West and Chester, with routes of national importance carrying traffic in all directions to locations including Flintshire, Halton, Wirral and Wrexham.

European Route E05 is routed via the M6, carrying international traffic between Scotland, North West England, the West Midlands and France via Southampton. European route E22 is routed via the A494 and M56, carrying international traffic between Ireland (the route in fact begins at the Port of Holyhead), North Wales, North West England, Yorkshire and the Netherlands. Both routes meet at Lymm Interchange, which lies in neighbouring Cheshire East.

Three Roman roads exist in Cheshire West and Chester:

- Two originate in Chester. (Deva Victrix) and running to Northwich (Condate) and Whitchurch (Mediolanum) respectively.
- The Roman road of Kings Street in Northwich, which runs from Middlewich to Warrington.

The section of the A51 between its western terminus and the B5132 was named as one of the most congested roads in the United Kingdom by INRIX in August 2015.

Three local MPs – Graham Evans, Justin Madders and Chris Matheson – raised safety concerns about the M56 between J12 and J14 in parliament after more than 160 incidents were recorded since 2011. In response, Andrew Jones, the Parliamentary Under Secretary of State for Transport, confirmed that an upgrade to smart motorway will only take place after 2020.

=== Water ===
Navigable waterways in the borough include the Manchester Ship Canal, Shropshire Union Canal, Trent and Mersey Canal and the Weaver Navigation. The latter two are connected together by the Anderton Boat Lift, near Northwich; this is the only caisson lift lock in the United Kingdom.

== Places of interest ==
=== Tourist attractions ===
Key
	Abbey/Priory/Cathedral
Accessible open space	Accessible open space
	Amusement/Theme Park
	Castle
Country Park	Country Park
	English Heritage
	Forestry Commission
Heritage railway	Heritage railway
Historic house	Historic House
Places of Worship	Places of Worship
Museum (free) Museum	Museum (free/not free)
National Trust	National Trust
	Theatre
	Zoo

- Abbeywood estate
- Aldersey Green Golf Club
- Anderton Boat Lift
- Beeston Castle
- Bickerton Hill SSSI
- Blakemere Craft Centre
- Blue Planet Aquarium
- Bluebell Cottage Gardens
- Bolesworth Castle
- Burton Mere Wetlands (part of Dee Estuary RSPB reserve)
- Carden Park Hotel
- Cheshire Military Museum
- Cheshire Oaks Designer Outlet
- Cheshire Workshops
- Chester Castle
- Chester Cathedral
- Chester city walls
- Chester Racecourse
- Chester Roman Amphitheatre
- Chester History and Heritage
- Chester Rows
- Chester Zoo
- Craxton Wood Hotel
- The Crocky Trail
- Delamere Forest
- Deva Stadium
- Dewa Roman Experience
- Grosvenor Museum
- Grosvenor Park
- Grosvenor Park Open Air Theatre
- The Groves
- Harlequin Theatre
- Hoole Hall
- Ice Cream Farm
- JF Polo Academy
- Lion Salt Works
- Little Budworth Country Park
- Manley Mere
- Marbury Country Park
- Mersey View
- National Waterways Museum
- Ness Botanic Gardens
- Northgate Arena
- Oulton Park
- Parkgate salt marsh (part of Dee Estuary RSPB reserve and SSSI)
- Parkgate sea front
- Portal Hotel, Golf and Spa
- Pryors Hayes Golf Club
- Rowton Hall
- Rowton Moor battle site
- St John the Baptist's Church, Chester
- Stonyford Cottage Gardens
- Stretton Watermill
- Tirley Garth
- Vale Royal Falconry Centre
- Walk Mill
- Weaver Hall Museum and Workhouse
- Willington Hall
- Wincham Park
- Wirral Country Park

== Media ==
=== Television ===
The area is served by BBC North West and ITV Granada with television signals received from the Winter Hill TV transmitter.

=== Radio ===
Radio stations for the area are:

- BBC Radio Merseyside
- Heart North West
- Smooth North West
- Capital North West & Wales
- Greatest Hits Radio Liverpool & The North West
- Hits Radio Liverpool
- Dee Radio, a community based station that broadcast from Chester.

== Sport ==
=== Football ===
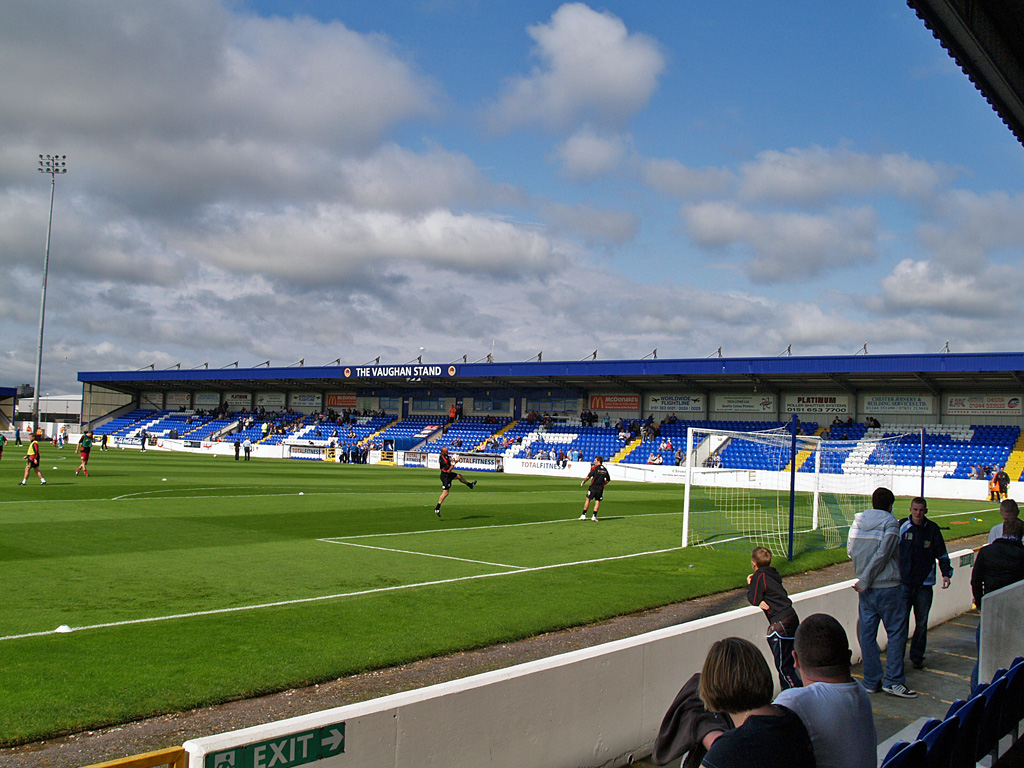
Deva Stadium

Chester FC are the highest ranked club in the area and compete in the National League North (the sixth tier of English football). Northwich has four semi-professional teams – Barnton, Northwich Victoria, Witton Albion and 1874 Northwich – all of whom play in regional leagues. Winsford is also represented in the non-league pyramid by Winsford United, and Ellesmere Port by Vauxhall Motors FC – the former works team of the Vauxhall Ellesmere Port assembly plant.

Below level ten of the English pyramid are county-wide amateur leagues, with two covering the geographic area of the borough – the Cheshire Association Football League and West Cheshire Association Football League. Although several clubs are members of the former, many more compete in the latter. Below that is the Chester & Wirral Football League, and also the Mid-Cheshire district leagues who cater for the areas of knutsford, Northwich, Middlewich and Winsford where teams representing neighbourhoods/villages and/or pubs/social clubs ('pub teams') compete.

The largest football stadium in Cheshire West and Chester is the Deva Stadium, home to Chester FC, although the ground famously straddles the England-Wales border.

== Twin towns ==
Whilst the borough per se does not have any twinning agreements, several of its settlements have agreements predating its creation in 2009, listed below:

Settlement(s)	Twin town(s)
Barrow; Littleton	Aubignan, France
Chester	Sens, France; Lörrach, Germany; Senigallia, Italy
Ellesmere Port	Reutlingen, Germany
Malpas	Questembert, France
Northwich	Dole, France; Carlow, Ireland
Tarporley	Bohars, France
Upton-by-Chester	Arradon, France
Winsford	Deuil-la-Barre, France

== See also ==
- Cheshire County Council
- Cheshire East Council
- Chester City Council
