= Listed buildings in Norley =

Norley is a civil parish in Cheshire West and Chester, England. Other than the village of Norley, it is entirely rural. The parish contains three buildings that are recorded in the National Heritage List for England as designated listed buildings. These consist of a country house, a church, and a monument in the churchyard.

== Key ==
Grade	Criteria
Grade II*	Particularly important buildings of more than special interest.
Grade II	Buildings of national importance and special interest.

== Buildings ==
Name and location	Photograph	Date	Notes	Grade
Norley Hall; 53.2525°N 2.6536°W	—	1782	A country house built on the site of earlier houses, and subsequently enlarged and altered in Tudor Revival style. The house is rendered, with slate roofs; it is in two storeys with an attic and basement, it has an irregular plan, and has been divided into two dwellings. Its features include a porch with buttresses, pinnacles, and a balustrade, and an octagonal stair turret surmounted by a bellcote with a conical roof.	II
Woodhouse monument, St John the Evangelist's Church; 53.25073°N 2.65940°W	—	1840	This is a monument to the Woodhouse family. It is in limestone on a sandstone base, and has brass memorial plaques. The monument stands about 3 metres (10 ft) high.	II
St John the Evangelist's Church; 53.2507°N 2.6598°W		1878–79	Designed by J. L. Pearson, the church is constructed in red sandstone with a red tile roof. Its style is that of the later 13th century; it has a central tower.	II*
