= Kingsley, Cheshire =

Village in Cheshire, England

Coordinates: 53.2692°N 2.6753°W

Kingsley
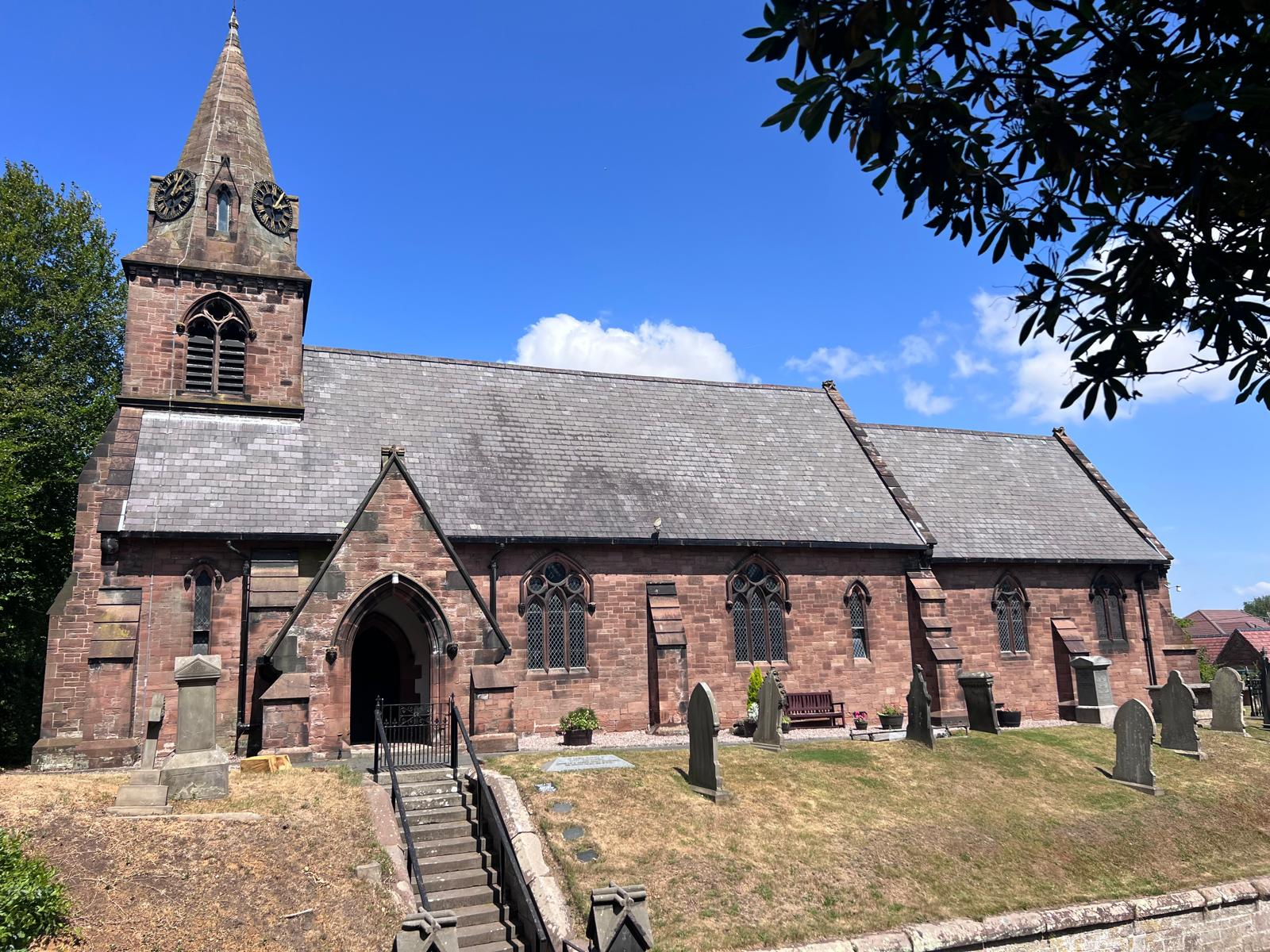
- St John the Evangelist's Church, Kingsley

- Location within Cheshire
- Population: 1,987 (2011)
- OS grid reference: SJ550748
- Unitary authority: Cheshire West and Chester
- Ceremonial county: Cheshire
- Region: North West
- Country: England
- Sovereign state: United Kingdom
- Post town: Frodsham
- Postcode district: WA6
- Dialling code: 01928
- Police: Cheshire
- Fire: Cheshire
- Ambulance: North West
- UK Parliament: Runcorn and Helsby
- Website: Kingsley website

Kingsley is a civil parish and a village in the unitary authority of Cheshire West and Chester and the ceremonial county of Cheshire, England. Situated approximately 5 miles south east of the town of Frodsham and 2.5 miles north of Delamere Forest, the village lies within a rural stretch of mid-Cheshire countryside characterised by sandstone farmland, ancient woodland and open fields.

The village has a recorded history stretching back to the Domesday Book of 1086, and retains many features of a traditional English rural community, including a Grade II listed parish church designed by George Gilbert Scott. The village is home to two primary schools – Kingsley St John's Church of England Primary School and Kingsley Community Primary School.

== History ==
Kingsley is first listed in the Domesday Book of 1086 as Chingeslie in the Roelau Hundred. The village is listed as having been held from Earl Hugh d'Avranches by a Saxon named Dunning. It has land for two ploughs, and home to five serfs, one villein, and three bordars. It also mentioned one and a half fisheries, four hays for roe deer, and a hawk's eyrie. The earl brought the woodland of one league long and one league wide into his forest. The forest mentioned was the ancient forest of Mara and Mondrem which was greatly reduced in size subsequently and is now known as Delamere Forest.

In 1260, the village was listed as Kingisleg. The name of the village ultimately derives from "king's lea" – the meadow of the king.

The village was for a long time known for its independence, as shown in its early Quaker meeting house, as well as its siding with the Parliamentarians during the English Civil War.

== Geography ==
Kingsley lies within a rural stretch of mid-Cheshire countryside, situated on the northern edge of the Mid Cheshire Ridge, also known as the Cheshire Sandstone Ridge, a landscape of rolling sandstone hills, ancient woodland and enclosed farmland that stretches southward through the county toward Malpas. The ridge was shortlisted for designation as an Area of Outstanding Natural Beauty in 2021.

The village sits approximately 5 miles (8 km) south-east of Frodsham and 2.5 miles (4 km) north of Delamere Forest, the largest area of woodland in Cheshire. The surrounding countryside is characterised by small-to-medium fields bounded by hedgerows, scattered farms and ponds typical of the wider Cheshire Plain landscape.

== Governance ==
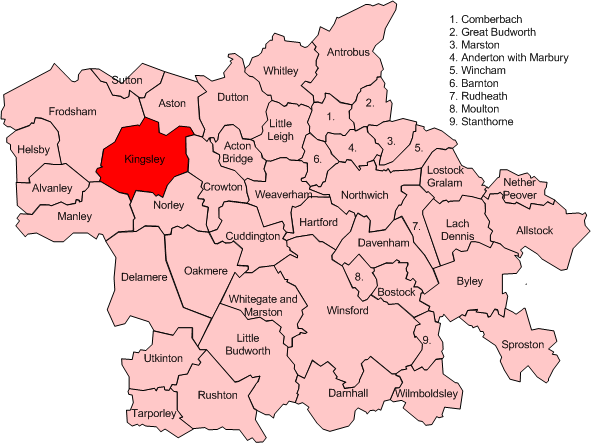
Map of civil parish of Kingsley within the former borough of Vale Royal

Kingsley was a township in Frodsham ancient parish. It was made a separate civil parish in 1866, having been made a separate ecclesiastical parish in 1853. It was originally in Eddisbury Hundred, and after the reforms of the 19th century, became part of Runcorn Rural District. It was also in Runcorn Poor Law Union and Runcorn Sanitary District until 1974, and in the borough of Vale Royal from 1974 to 2009.

An electoral ward in the same name exists. This stretches from Sutton in the north to Norley in the south. The total population of this ward taken at the 2011 Census was 4,222.

== Transport ==
The nearest railway station is Acton Bridge, approximately 3 miles (4.8 km) from the village, which sits on the West Coast Main Line with services toward Liverpool and Birmingham.

Frodsham railway station is approximately 3.2 miles (5.1 km) away and is managed by Transport for Wales. It offers an hourly service between Chester and Manchester Airport, with most services continuing to Holyhead via Rhyl, as well as an hourly service between Liverpool Lime Street and Llandudno, giving a combined off-peak frequency of two trains per hour in each direction. Delamere railway station, approximately 3.1 miles (5 km) to the south, provides services to Chester, Northwich and Manchester.

The village is served by local bus services connecting to Frodsham and Northwich.

== Community ==
Kingsley is home to a number of community services including a community centre, The Kingsley Village Institute, serves as the main village hall and community hub, hosting regular events and providing facilities including refurbished tennis courts managed by Kingsley Tennis Club.

Active organisations include the Kingsley Cricket Club, Kingsley Players amateur dramatic society, a Garden Club, a Bookworms reading group, a Walking Club, a Women's Institute, Kingsley Allotment Society, and Scout and Guide groups. Kingsley Youth Group provides activities for young people in the village.

The parish council maintains playing fields, open spaces, playgrounds and an outdoor gym, as well as managing Kingsley Cemetery. The village publishes a monthly newsletter, the Kingsley News, distributed to residents throughout the year except August.

As well as a website there is a village Facebook group for advertising and discussing local events

=== Kingsley Cricket Club ===
The Cricket Club fields two senior teams playing in the Meller Braggins Cheshire Cricket League, a Sunday XI, and a midweek team (The Kingsley Knights) playing in the Chester and District Midweek Cricket League. The club also runs a junior division with U18, U15, U13, U11 and U9 squads playing fixtures throughout the summer.

== Education ==
Kingsley has two primary schools. Kingsley Community Primary and Nursery School is a community school serving children aged 2 to 11, offering wraparound childcare provision. Kingsley St John's Church of England Primary School is a Church of England school in the Diocese of Chester, also serving children aged 3 to 11, situated on Hollow Lane in the village centre.

Secondary age pupils generally transfer to schools in Frodsham and the surrounding area, including Weaverham High School.

== Religion ==
Until the 19th century, the local parish church was that of St Laurence, at Overton in nearby Frodsham. In 1851 the red sandstone Anglican Church of St John the Evangelist was consecrated, having been built to a design of George Gilbert Scott, and in 1853 it became the village's parish church.

The current Methodist chapel, Hurst Methodist Chapel, was built in 1871. Between 1864 and 1967 there was a second Methodist chapel, Brookside Methodist Chapel.

== Demography ==
=== Population ===
- 1801: 661
- 1851: 1067
- 1901: 1066
- 1951: 1503
- 2001: 2026
- 2011: 1986

=== Notable residents ===
- Paula Radcliffe
- Bob Carolgees
- Emily Speed
- Luke Browning

== See also ==
- Listed buildings in Kingsley, Cheshire
- Kingsley Castle
- Crewood Hall
