= Crewood Hall =

Country house in Cheshire, England

Coordinates: 53.28060°N 2.65185°W

Crewood Hall is a country house to the northeast of the village of Kingsley, Cheshire, England. It dates from the 16th century, and has a porch dated 1638. Initially timber-framed, the building was encased in brick and remodelled in the 19th century. It has stone dressings and tiled roofs, and is in two storeys. The house consists of a hall with two cross wings and a two-storey porch at the end of the left wing. The lower storey of the porch is in sandstone and in the upper storey the timber-framing is exposed. The house is recorded in the National Heritage List for England as a designated Grade II* listed building. Associated with the house, and also listed at Grade II, are two farm buildings; stables, and a shippon and barn.

== See also ==
- Listed buildings in Kingsley, Cheshire
