= St John the Evangelist's Church, Kingsley =

Coordinates: 53.2701°N 2.6799°W

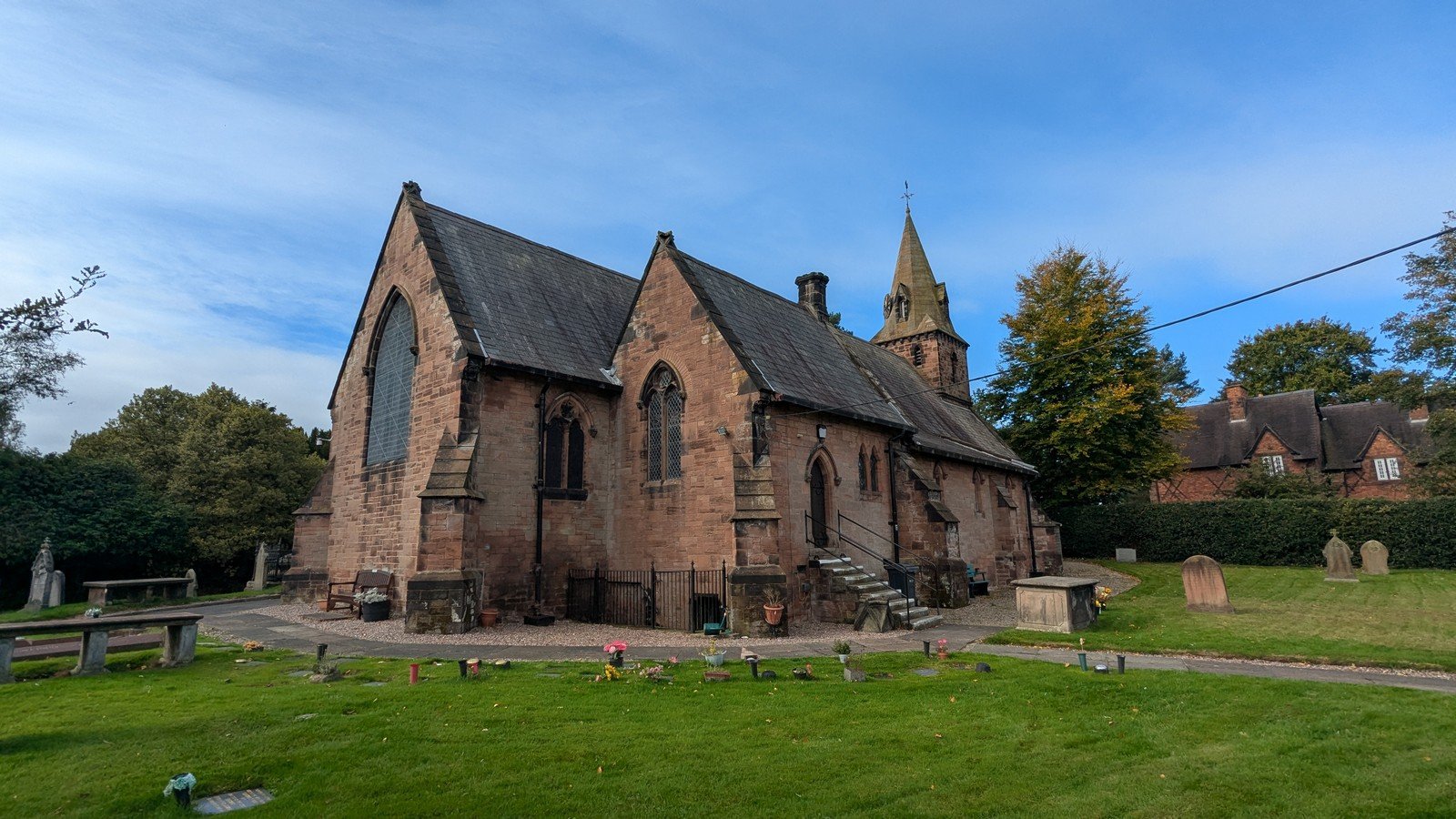
- St John the Evangelist's Church, Kingsley

- Location in Cheshire
- OS grid reference: SJ 548 750
- Location: Hollow Lane, Kingsley, Cheshire
- Country: England
- Denomination: Anglican
- Website: St John the Evangelist, Kingsley

History
- Status: Parish church
- Dedication: John the Evangelist

Architecture
- Functional status: Active
- Heritage designation: Grade II
- Designated: 6 December 1985
- Architect: George Gilbert Scott
- Architectural type: Church
- Style: Gothic Revival
- Groundbreaking: 1849
- Completed: 1850

Specifications
- Materials: Sandstone, slate roofs

Administration
- Province: York
- Diocese: Chester
- Archdeaconry: Chester
- Deanery: Frodsham
- Parish: Kingsley

Clergy
- Vicar: Revd Peter Rugen

St John the Evangelist's Church is in Hollow Lane, Kingsley, Cheshire, England. It is an active Anglican parish church in the deanery of Frodsham, the archdeaconry of Chester, and the diocese of Chester. Its benefice is united with those of Christ Church, Crowton, and St John the Evangelist, Norley. The church is recorded in the National Heritage List for England as a designated Grade II listed building. It was a Commissioners' church, having received a grant towards its construction from the Church Building Commission.

== History ==
The church was built in 1849–50 to a design by George Gilbert Scott. A grant of £150 (equivalent to £20,000 in 2025) was given towards its construction by the Church Building Commission.

== Architecture ==
St John's is constructed in red sandstone rubble, and has grey slate roofs. Its architectural style is that of the late 13th century. The plan consists of a nave with a south porch and a short north aisle, a chancel with a north sacristy, and a west tower with a spire. The tower is embraced by two chambers that are not part of the aisle. The tower rises for a single stage above the nave; it has angle buttresses, triangular bell openings with tracery consisting of three circles, and a corbel table. The spire is splay-footed, with lucarnes on the cardinal sides, and clock faces on three of the oblique sides. The windows are lancets containing Geometric tracery.

Inside the church is a timber three-bay arcade. At the west end is a baptistry with an octagonal font. The reredos is in stone with polished granite columns. The wrought iron screen is dated 1913. The stained glass in the east window, dating from 1880, is by Clayton and Bell. The church has an electronic organ that replaced a former pipe organ made by Harrison & Harrison.

== See also ==
- List of new churches by George Gilbert Scott in Northern England
- Listed buildings in Kingsley, Cheshire
