= Norley =

Village in Cheshire, England

Coordinates: 53.246°N 2.647°W

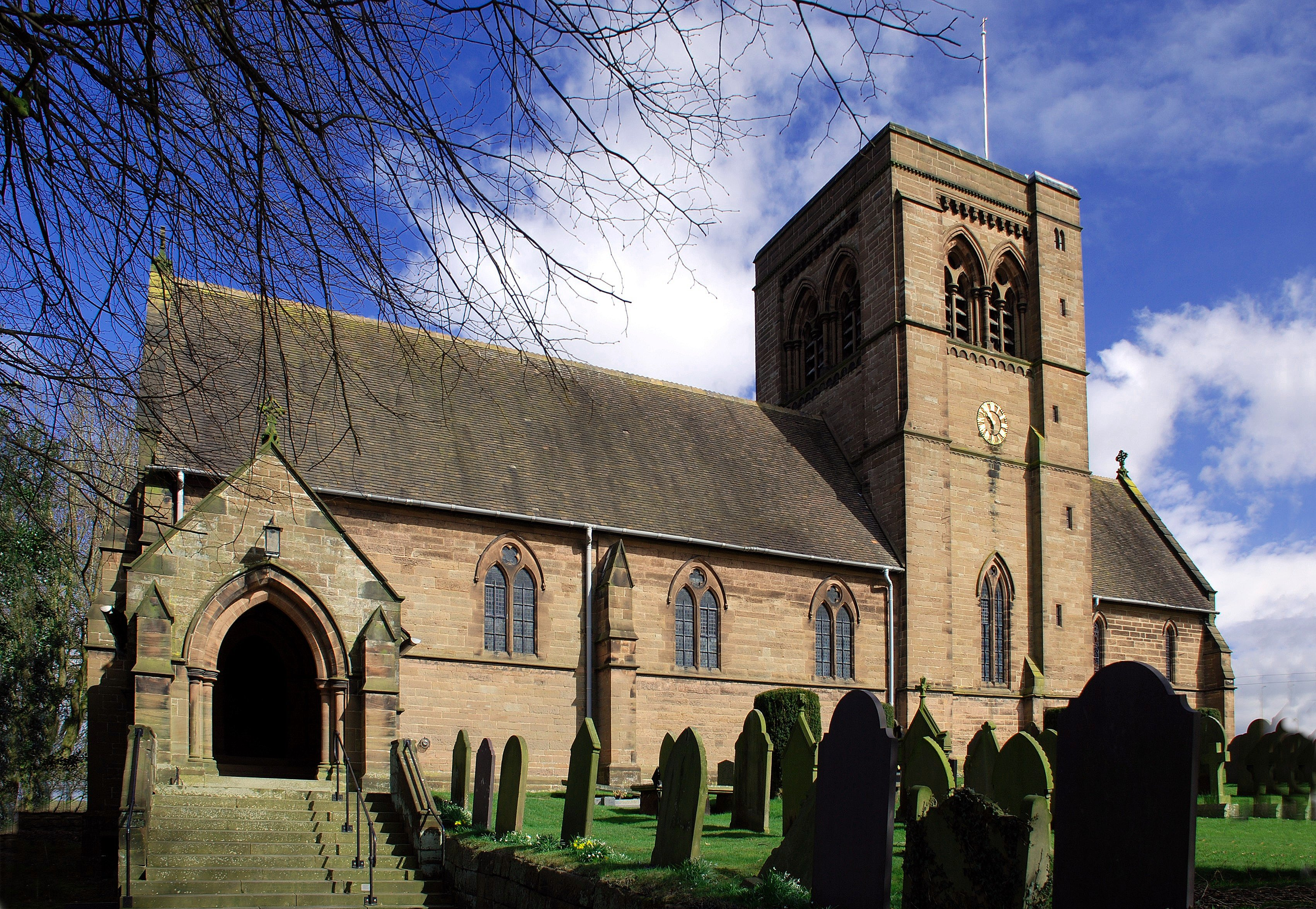
- St John the Evangelist's Church

- Location within Cheshire
- Population: 1,169 (2011)
- OS grid reference: SJ567724
- Civil parish: Norley
- Unitary authority: Cheshire West and Chester
- Ceremonial county: Cheshire
- Region: North West
- Country: England
- Sovereign state: United Kingdom
- Post town: FRODSHAM
- Postcode district: WA6
- Dialling code: 01928
- Police: Cheshire
- Fire: Cheshire
- Ambulance: North West
- UK Parliament: Chester South and Eddisbury

Norley is a village and civil parish in Cheshire, England, north of Delamere Forest, near the village of Cuddington. The population at the 2011 census was 1,169. Its name is derived from “Norlegh”, which means “north clearing”.

== History ==
In the Domesday Book, Norley was included under the manor of Kingsley. During the reign of Henry III the manor of Norley was granted to Richard de Kingsleigh, and Roger de Norley was granted land within the manor. Later the area was dominated by two estates, Norley Hall and Norley Bank.

=== Norley Hall ===
The first Norley Hall was built at the beginning of the 15th century and the present hall dates from 1782 when it was built by William Hall. In the 19th century the hall was bought by the Woodhouse family of Liverpool. It was later occupied by Charles F. Bell and then the Dronsfield family. It has now been divided into apartments.

=== Norley Bank ===
Norley Bank was built by James Croxton in the 18th century and later acquired by Rev. Rowland Egerton. His eldest son was Rowland Egerton-Warburton who inherited the Arley and Warburton estates, and who built the present Arley Hall. Hon. Arthur Lascelles bought the house in about 1852 and it remained in private ownership until in the Second World War when it was used as a British Red Cross hospital. In 1953 it was bought by Liverpool Corporation with the intention of converting it into an approved school, but this did not materialise and in 1957 it was sold and demolished.

== Geography ==
Norley lies in rural farmland to the north of Delamere Forest and is connected to the surrounding villages by unclassified roads. To the northwest is Kingsley, to the north Crowton, and to the east are Cuddington and Sandiway.

== Landmarks ==
The Church of St John the Evangelist stands to the northwest of the village. It is a Grade II* listed building dating from 1879 which was designed by J. Loughborough Pearson. In the churchyard is a monument to the Woodhouse family which is listed Grade II. The other Grade-II-listed building in the village is Norley Hall and its adjoining farm. The public house in the village is the Tiger's Head. This was originally a farmhouse and opened as a beerhouse in 1840. There's also a shop called the stores that services the local area.

== Education ==
Norley Church of England School was founded in 1836 as a Sunday school and became a day school in 1844. It was paid for by Samuel Woodhouse of Norley Hall and later supported by the Lascelles family of Norley Bank. In 1989 it was replaced by Norley Church of England County Primary School in Hough Lane.

== Notable people ==
Martin Lewis Founder of Money Saving Expert grew up in the village where his father was the Headmaster at the local Jewish school

== See also ==
- Listed buildings in Norley
