= List of primary destinations on the United Kingdom road network =

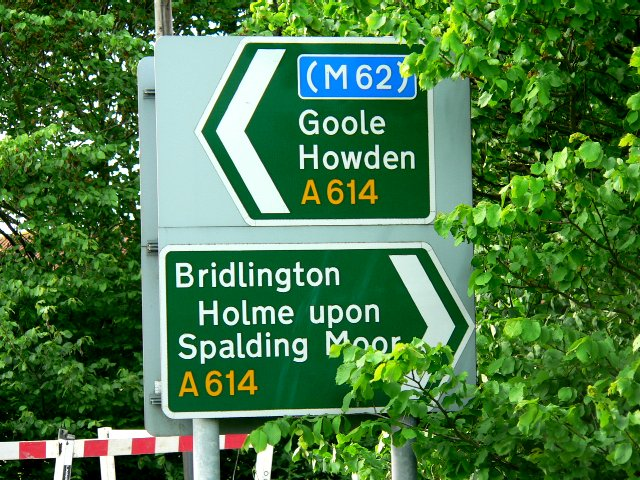
Directional sign showing primary destinations only.

Primary destinations are locations that appear on route confirmation signs in the United Kingdom. Most are important settlements or conurbations, but some are bridges and tunnels, or even villages that are important junctions, e.g. Scotch Corner or Crianlarich.

In 1994, previous lists for destinations in Great Britain were superseded when English, Scottish and Welsh destinations were prescribed in Appendix C of Local Transport Note 1/94: The Design and Use of Directional Informatory Signs (LTN 1/94), published by the then Department of Transport. A revised list for England was published in 2009 and updated in 2010.

A revised list for Scotland was published in 2024 by Transport Scotland.

The 1994 list had 333 entries for England. When the 2010 list was compiled, 15 entries were removed (Note: Entries that were removed: Alton, Avonmouth, Bawtry, Brighouse, Esher, Hatfield, March, Midhurst, Redhill, Stretford, Stroud, Swanley, Wells, Wimbourne and Workington) and 16 added, (Note: Entries that were added: Altrincham, Crewe, Ellesmere Port, Garston, Heysham, Huyton, Keighley, Leigh, Manchester Airport, Newquay, Shepton Mallet, Speke, Trafford Park, Tunbridge Wells, Uckfield, Wellingborough) giving a total of 334 entries. In December 2011, following a consultation, the Department for Transport announced that it would add Birmingham Airport, East Midlands Airport, Luton Airport, Thamesport (for Medway Ports East) and Port of Tilbury; and, in response to local feedback, that it would also add Colne and Minehead and ratify the removal of Stone.

The list for Northern Ireland destinations has always been maintained separately from those for Great Britain. Since devolution under the Scotland Act 1998 and the Government of Wales Act 1998, transport matters and hence responsibility for maintaining lists of primary destinations have been devolved to the Scottish Parliament and the Senedd and their respective governments.

Some maps show primary destinations in a different colour or font size to other places. However, these sometimes include places which are not on the official lists.

== Signage ==
Primary destinations in Greater London, other than Heathrow Airport and London, will generally only be signed within the M25 motorway.

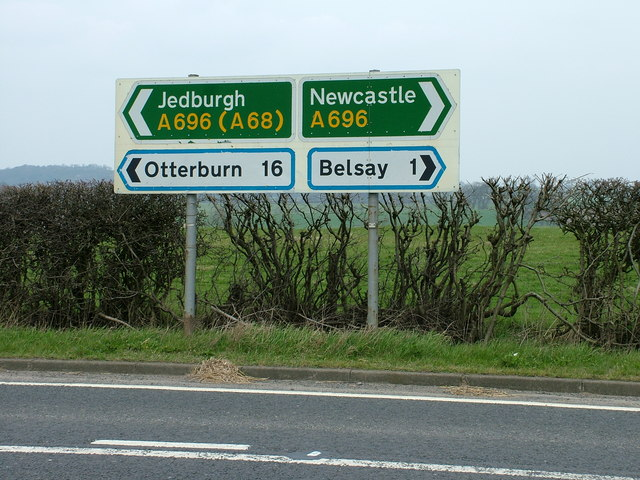
Directional sign showing both primary destination (on a green background) and non-primary destinations (on a white background) at a conventional "T" junction.

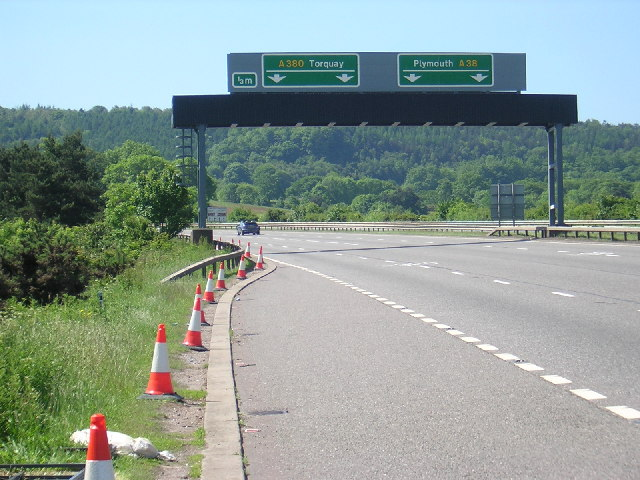
Overhead directional sign on a dual carriageway.

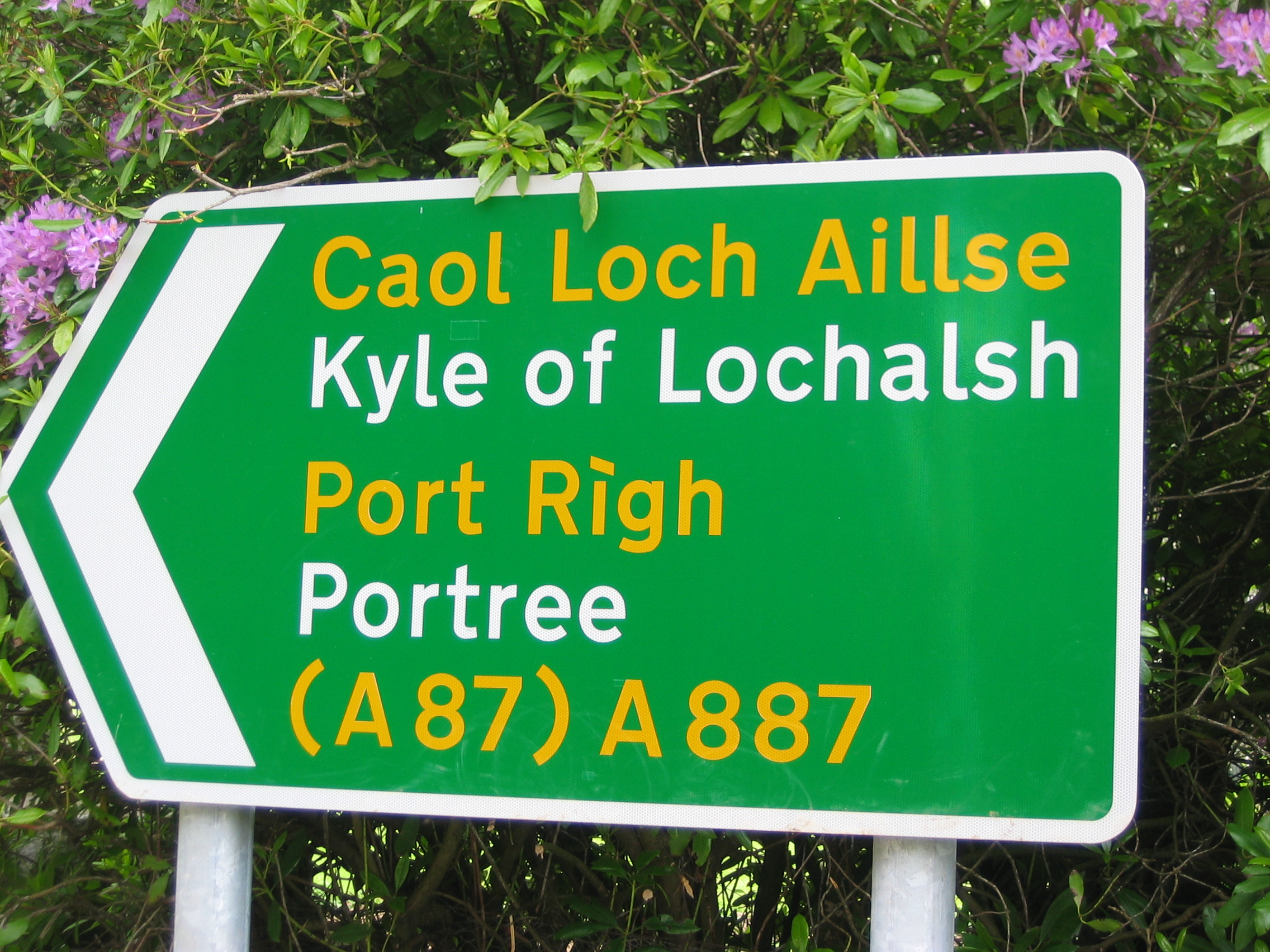
Directional road sign in Scotland with destinations in both English and Scottish Gaelic.

== List of primary destinations ==
=== Great Britain ===
The entries for England in this list were compiled from the 2010 list and 2011 amendments. Those for Scotland are in accordance with the list published in 2024 by Transport Scotland, while those for Wales were compiled from the 1994 list. (Note: The choice of ceremonial rather than administrative county was prompted by the lack of consistency in the English local government system as some areas are covered by county and district councils, while others have a unitary authority.)

| Region | Ceremonial county | Destination | National translation⁮ (Note: Every destination in Wales along with some English destinations signed within the country is translated into Welsh where applicable on road signs.) (Note: Bilingual road signs with Scottish Gaelic translations of destinations have been phased in across the Scottish Highlands and the A9 trunk road between Inverness and Perth.) |
|---|---|---|---|
| East of England | Bedfordshire | Bedford | |
| East of England | Bedfordshire | Dunstable | |
| East of England | Bedfordshire | Luton | |
| East of England | Bedfordshire | Luton Airport | |
| South East England | Berkshire | Bracknell | |
| South East England | Berkshire | Hungerford | |
| South East England | Berkshire | Maidenhead | |
| South East England | Berkshire | Newbury | |
| South East England | Berkshire | Reading | |
| South East England | Berkshire | Slough | |
| South West England | Bristol | Avonmouth | |
| South West England | Bristol | Bristol | Bryste |
| South East England | Buckinghamshire | Amersham | |
| South East England | Buckinghamshire | Aylesbury | |
| South East England | Buckinghamshire | Beaconsfield | |
| South East England | Buckinghamshire | High Wycombe (often as just "Wycombe") | |
| South East England | Buckinghamshire | Milton Keynes | |
| East of England | Cambridgeshire | Cambridge | |
| East of England | Cambridgeshire | Ely | |
| East of England | Cambridgeshire | Huntingdon | |
| East of England | Cambridgeshire | Peterborough | |
| East of England | Cambridgeshire | Wisbech | |
| North West England | Cheshire | Chester | Caer |
| North West England | Cheshire | Congleton | |
| North West England | Cheshire | Crewe | |
| North West England | Cheshire | Ellesmere Port | |
| North West England | Cheshire | Macclesfield | |
| North West England | Cheshire | Nantwich | |
| North West England | Cheshire | Northwich | |
| North West England | Cheshire | Runcorn | |
| North West England | Cheshire | Warrington | |
| North West England | Cheshire | Widnes | |
| South West England | Cornwall | Bodmin | |
| South West England | Cornwall | Bude | |
| South West England | Cornwall | Falmouth | |
| South West England | Cornwall | Helston | |
| South West England | Cornwall | Launceston | |
| South West England | Cornwall | Liskeard | |
| South West England | Cornwall | Newquay | |
| South West England | Cornwall | Penzance | |
| South West England | Cornwall | Redruth | |
| South West England | Cornwall | St Austell | |
| South West England | Cornwall | Truro | |
| South West England | Cornwall | Wadebridge | |
| North West England | Cumbria | Barrow-in-Furness | |
| North West England | Cumbria | Brough | |
| North West England | Cumbria | Carlisle | |
| North West England | Cumbria | Kendal | |
| North West England | Cumbria | Keswick | |
| North West England | Cumbria | Kirkby Lonsdale | |
| North West England | Cumbria | Penrith | |
| North West England | Cumbria | Whitehaven | |
| North West England | Cumbria | Windermere | |
| East Midlands | Derbyshire | Ashbourne | |
| East Midlands | Derbyshire | Buxton | |
| East Midlands | Derbyshire | Chesterfield | |
| East Midlands | Derbyshire | Derby | |
| East Midlands | Derbyshire | Matlock | |
| South West England | Devon | Barnstaple | |
| South West England | Devon | Bideford | |
| South West England | Devon | Exeter | |
| South West England | Devon | Exmouth | |
| South West England | Devon | Honiton | |
| South West England | Devon | Okehampton | |
| South West England | Devon | Paignton | |
| South West England | Devon | Plymouth | |
| South West England | Devon | Tavistock | |
| South West England | Devon | Torquay | |
| South West England | Dorset | Blandford | |
| South West England | Dorset | Bournemouth | |
| South West England | Dorset | Dorchester | |
| South West England | Dorset | Poole | |
| South West England | Dorset | Shaftesbury | |
| South West England | Dorset | Weymouth | |
| North East England | County Durham | Bishop Auckland | |
| North East England | County Durham | Consett | |
| North East England | County Durham | Darlington | |
| North East England | County Durham | Durham | |
| North East England | County Durham | Hartlepool | |
| North East England | County Durham | Stockton (Note: The Teesside conurbation area straddles the North Yorkshire/County Durham border. Outside this area, Teesside is used, otherwise Middlesbrough (which is entirely within North Yorkshire) and Stockton (whose town centre is in County Durham) are used.) | |
| Yorkshire and the Humber | East Riding of Yorkshire | Bridlington | |
| Yorkshire and the Humber | East Riding of Yorkshire | Goole | |
| Yorkshire and the Humber | East Riding of Yorkshire | Hull | |
| Yorkshire and the Humber | East Riding of Yorkshire, Lincolnshire | Humber Bridge | |
| South East England | East Sussex | Brighton | |
| South East England | East Sussex | Eastbourne | |
| South East England | East Sussex | Hastings | |
| South East England | East Sussex | Lewes | |
| South East England | East Sussex | Newhaven | |
| South East England | East Sussex | Uckfield | |
| East of England | Essex | Basildon | |
| East of England | Essex | Chelmsford | |
| East of England | Essex | Clacton | |
| East of England | Essex | Colchester | |
| East of England | Essex | Dartford Crossing | |
| East of England | Essex | Harlow | |
| East of England | Essex | Harwich | |
| East of England | Essex | Port of Tilbury | |
| East of England | Essex | Southend | |
| East of England | Essex | Stansted Airport | |
| East of England | Essex | Tilbury | |
| South West England | Gloucestershire | Cheltenham | |
| South West England | Gloucestershire | Cirencester | |
| South West England | Gloucestershire | Gloucester | Caerloyw |
| Greater London | Greater London | Heathrow Airport | |
| Greater London | Greater London | London | Llundain |
| Greater London | Greater London | Barking | |
| Greater London | Greater London | Bexleyheath | |
| Greater London | Greater London | Brent Cross | |
| Greater London | Greater London | Brixton | |
| Greater London | Greater London | Bromley | |
| Greater London | Greater London | Central London | |
| Greater London | City of London | The City | |
| Greater London | Greater London | Clapham Junction | |
| Greater London | Greater London | Croydon | |
| Greater London | Greater London | Dalston | |
| Greater London | Greater London | Docklands | |
| Greater London | Greater London | Ealing | |
| Greater London | Greater London | Enfield | |
| Greater London | Greater London | Hammersmith | |
| Greater London | Greater London | Harrow | |
| Greater London | Greater London | Holloway | |
| Greater London | Greater London | Hounslow | |
| Greater London | Greater London | Ilford | |
| Greater London | Greater London | Kilburn | |
| Greater London | Greater London | Kingston | |
| Greater London | Greater London | Lewisham | |
| Greater London | Greater London | Peckham | |
| Greater London | Greater London | Richmond | |
| Greater London | Greater London | Romford | |
| Greater London | Greater London | Stratford | |
| Greater London | Greater London | Sutton | |
| Greater London | Greater London | Uxbridge | |
| Greater London | Greater London | Vauxhall | |
| Greater London | Greater London | Walthamstow | |
| Greater London | Greater London | Wembley | |
| Greater London | Greater London | West End | |
| Greater London | Greater London | Westminster | |
| Greater London | Greater London | Wimbledon | |
| Greater London | Greater London | Wood Green | |
| Greater London | Greater London | Woolwich | |
| North West England | Greater Manchester | Altrincham | |
| North West England | Greater Manchester | Ashton-under-Lyne | |
| North West England | Greater Manchester | Bolton | |
| North West England | Greater Manchester | Bury | |
| North West England | Greater Manchester | Leigh | |
| North West England | Greater Manchester | Manchester | Manceinion |
| North West England | Greater Manchester | Manchester Airport | |
| North West England | Greater Manchester | Oldham | |
| North West England | Greater Manchester | Rochdale | |
| North West England | Greater Manchester | Salford | |
| North West England | Greater Manchester | Stockport | |
| North West England | Greater Manchester | Trafford Park | |
| North West England | Greater Manchester | Wigan | |
| South East England | Hampshire | Andover | |
| South East England | Hampshire | Basingstoke | |
| South East England | Hampshire | Fareham | |
| South East England | Hampshire | Petersfield | |
| South East England | Hampshire | Portsmouth | |
| South East England | Hampshire | Ringwood | |
| South East England | Hampshire | Southampton | |
| South East England | Hampshire | Winchester | |
| West Midlands | Herefordshire | Hereford | Henffordd |
| West Midlands | Herefordshire | Leominster | Llanllieni |
| West Midlands | Herefordshire | Ross-on-Wye (often as just "Ross") | Rhosan ar Wy |
| East of England | Hertfordshire | Hemel Hempstead | |
| East of England | Hertfordshire | Hertford | |
| East of England | Hertfordshire | St Albans | |
| East of England | Hertfordshire | Stevenage | |
| East of England | Hertfordshire | Watford | |
| South East England | Kent | Ashford | |
| South East England | Kent | Canterbury | |
| South East England | Kent | Channel Tunnel | |
| South East England | Kent | Dartford Crossing | |
| South East England | Kent | Dover | |
| South East England | Kent | Folkestone | |
| South East England | Kent | Maidstone | |
| South East England | Kent | Margate | |
| South East England | Kent | Ramsgate | |
| South East England | Kent | Sevenoaks | |
| South East England | Kent | Sheerness | |
| South East England | Kent | Thamesport | |
| South East England | Kent | Tunbridge Wells | |
| North West England | Lancashire | Blackburn | |
| North West England | Lancashire | Blackpool | |
| North West England | Lancashire | Burnley | |
| North West England | Lancashire | Clitheroe | |
| North West England | Lancashire | Colne | |
| North West England | Lancashire | Fleetwood | |
| North West England | Lancashire | Heysham | |
| North West England | Lancashire | Lancaster | |
| North West England | Lancashire | Morecambe | |
| North West England | Lancashire | Preston | |
| North West England | Lancashire | Skelmersdale | |
| East Midlands | Leicestershire | East Midlands Airport | |
| East Midlands | Leicestershire | Hinckley | |
| East Midlands | Leicestershire | Leicester | |
| East Midlands | Leicestershire | Loughborough | |
| East Midlands | Leicestershire | Market Harborough | |
| East Midlands | Leicestershire | Melton Mowbray | |
| Yorkshire and the Humber | Lincolnshire | Grimsby | |
| Yorkshire and the Humber | Lincolnshire | Immingham | |
| East Midlands | Lincolnshire | Boston | |
| East Midlands | Lincolnshire | Gainsborough | |
| East Midlands | Lincolnshire | Grantham | |
| East Midlands | Lincolnshire | Lincoln | |
| Yorkshire and the Humber | Lincolnshire | Scunthorpe | |
| East Midlands | Lincolnshire | Skegness | |
| East Midlands | Lincolnshire | Sleaford | |
| East Midlands | Lincolnshire | Spalding | |
| East Midlands | Lincolnshire | Stamford | |
| North West England | Merseyside | Birkenhead | Penbedw |
| North West England | Merseyside | Bootle | |
| North West England | Merseyside | Garston | |
| North West England | Merseyside | Huyton | |
| North West England | Merseyside | Liverpool | Lerpwl |
| North West England | Merseyside | St Helens | |
| North West England | Merseyside | Southport | |
| North West England | Merseyside | Speke | |
| North West England | Merseyside | Wallasey | |
| East of England | Norfolk | Cromer | |
| East of England | Norfolk | Diss | |
| East of England | Norfolk | Downham Market | |
| East of England | Norfolk | Great Yarmouth | |
| East of England | Norfolk | King's Lynn | |
| East of England | Norfolk | Norwich | |
| East of England | Norfolk | Swaffham | |
| East of England | Norfolk | Thetford | |
| East Midlands | Northamptonshire | Corby | |
| East Midlands | Northamptonshire | Kettering | |
| East Midlands | Northamptonshire | Northampton | |
| East Midlands | Northamptonshire | Wellingborough | |
| North East England | Northumberland | Alnwick | |
| North East England | Northumberland | Ashington | |
| North East England | Northumberland | Berwick-upon-Tweed (often as just "Berwick") | |
| North East England | Northumberland | Corbridge | |
| North East England | Northumberland | Hexham | |
| North East England | Northumberland | Morpeth | |
| Yorkshire and the Humber | North Yorkshire | Harrogate | |
| North East England | North Yorkshire | Middlesbrough | |
| Yorkshire and the Humber | North Yorkshire | Ripon | |
| Yorkshire and the Humber | North Yorkshire | Scarborough | |
| Yorkshire and the Humber | North Yorkshire | Scotch Corner | |
| Yorkshire and the Humber | North Yorkshire | Selby | |
| Yorkshire and the Humber | North Yorkshire | Skipton | |
| North East England | North Yorkshire | Teesside | |
| Yorkshire and the Humber | North Yorkshire | Thirsk | |
| Yorkshire and the Humber | North Yorkshire | Whitby | |
| Yorkshire and the Humber | North Yorkshire | York | |
| East Midlands | Nottinghamshire | Mansfield | |
| East Midlands | Nottinghamshire | Newark | |
| East Midlands | Nottinghamshire | Nottingham | |
| East Midlands | Nottinghamshire | Worksop | |
| South East England | Oxfordshire | Banbury | |
| South East England | Oxfordshire | Oxford | |
| East Midlands | Rutland | Oakham | |
| West Midlands | Shropshire | Bridgnorth | |
| West Midlands | Shropshire | Oswestry | Croesoswallt |
| West Midlands | Shropshire | Shrewsbury | Amwythig |
| West Midlands | Shropshire | Telford | |
| West Midlands | Shropshire | Whitchurch | Yr Eglwys Wen |
| South West England | Somerset | Bath | |
| South West England | Somerset | Bridgwater | |
| South West England | Somerset | Frome | |
| South West England | Somerset | Glastonbury | |
| South West England | Somerset | Minehead | |
| South West England | Somerset | Shepton Mallet | |
| South West England | Somerset | Taunton | |
| South West England | Somerset | Weston-super-Mare | |
| South West England | Somerset | Yeovil | |
| Yorkshire and the Humber | South Yorkshire | Barnsley | |
| Yorkshire and the Humber | South Yorkshire | Doncaster | |
| Yorkshire and the Humber | South Yorkshire | Rotherham | |
| Yorkshire and the Humber | South Yorkshire | Sheffield | |
| West Midlands | Staffordshire | Burton-upon-Trent (sometimes just as "Burton") | |
| West Midlands | Staffordshire | Cannock | |
| West Midlands | Staffordshire | Leek | |
| West Midlands | Staffordshire | Lichfield | |
| West Midlands | Staffordshire | Newcastle-under-Lyme (often as just "Newcastle") | |
| West Midlands | Staffordshire | Rugeley | |
| West Midlands | Staffordshire | Stafford | |
| West Midlands | Staffordshire | Stoke-on-Trent (often as just "Stoke") | |
| West Midlands | Staffordshire | Tamworth | |
| West Midlands | Staffordshire | Uttoxeter | |
| East of England | Suffolk | Beccles | |
| East of England | Suffolk | Bury St Edmunds | |
| East of England | Suffolk | Felixstowe | |
| East of England | Suffolk | Ipswich | |
| East of England | Suffolk | Lowestoft | |
| East of England | Suffolk | Newmarket | |
| East of England | Suffolk | Sudbury | |
| South East England | Surrey | Dorking | |
| South East England | Surrey | Farnham | |
| South East England | Surrey | Guildford | |
| South East England | Surrey | Reigate | |
| South East England | Surrey | Staines | |
| North East England | Tyne and Wear | Gateshead | |
| North East England | Tyne and Wear | Newcastle | |
| North East England | Tyne and Wear | South Shields | |
| North East England | Tyne and Wear | Sunderland | |
| North East England | Tyne and Wear | Tynemouth | |
| North East England | Tyne and Wear | Tyne Tunnel | |
| West Midlands | Warwickshire | Leamington Spa (often as just "Leamington") | |
| West Midlands | Warwickshire | Nuneaton | |
| West Midlands | Warwickshire | Rugby | |
| West Midlands | Warwickshire | Stratford-upon-Avon | |
| West Midlands | Warwickshire | Warwick | |
| West Midlands | West Midlands | Birmingham | |
| West Midlands | West Midlands | Birmingham Airport | |
| West Midlands | West Midlands | Brownhills | |
| West Midlands | West Midlands | Coventry | |
| West Midlands | West Midlands | Dudley | |
| West Midlands | West Midlands | Solihull | |
| West Midlands | West Midlands | Stourbridge | |
| West Midlands | West Midlands | Walsall | |
| West Midlands | West Midlands | West Bromwich | |
| West Midlands | West Midlands | Wolverhampton | |
| South East England | West Sussex | Bognor Regis | |
| South East England | West Sussex | Chichester | |
| South East England | West Sussex | Crawley | |
| South East England | West Sussex | East Grinstead | |
| South East England | West Sussex | Gatwick Airport | |
| South East England | West Sussex | Horsham | |
| South East England | West Sussex | Worthing | |
| Yorkshire and the Humber | West Yorkshire | Bradford | |
| Yorkshire and the Humber | West Yorkshire | Dewsbury | |
| Yorkshire and the Humber | West Yorkshire | Halifax | |
| Yorkshire and the Humber | West Yorkshire | Huddersfield | |
| Yorkshire and the Humber | West Yorkshire | Keighley | |
| Yorkshire and the Humber | West Yorkshire | Leeds | |
| Yorkshire and the Humber | West Yorkshire | Pontefract | |
| Yorkshire and the Humber | West Yorkshire | Wakefield | |
| Yorkshire and the Humber | West Yorkshire | Wetherby | |
| South West England | Wiltshire | Chippenham | |
| South West England | Wiltshire | Marlborough | |
| South West England | Wiltshire | Salisbury | |
| South West England | Wiltshire | Swindon | |
| South West England | Wiltshire | Trowbridge | |
| South West England | Wiltshire | Warminster | |
| West Midlands | Worcestershire | Bromsgrove | |
| West Midlands | Worcestershire | Evesham | |
| West Midlands | Worcestershire | Kidderminster | |
| West Midlands | Worcestershire | Redditch | |
| West Midlands | Worcestershire | Worcester | Caerwrangon |
| Scotland | Aberdeen | Aberdeen | |
| Scotland | Inverness-shire | Aviemore | An Aghaidh Mhòr |
| Scotland | Ayrshire | Ayr | |
| Scotland | Argyll | Campbeltown | Ceann Loch Chille Chiarain |
| Scotland | Stirlingshire | Crianlarich | A' Chrìon Làraich |
| Scotland | Dumfriesshire | Dumfries | |
| Scotland | Dundee | Dundee | Dùn Dèagh |
| Scotland | Fife | Dunfermline | |
| Scotland | Lanarkshire | East Kilbride | |
| Scotland | Lothian | Edinburgh | Dùn Èideann |
| Scotland | Moray | Elgin | |
| Scotland | Dunbartonshire, Renfrewshire | Erskine Bridge | |
| Scotland | Angus | Forfar | |
| Scotland | Inverness-shire | Fort William | An Gearasdan |
| Scotland | Aberdeenshire | Fraserburgh | |
| Scotland | Selkirkshire | Galashiels | |
| Scotland | Glasgow | Glasgow | Glaschu |
| Scotland | Renfrewshire | Greenock | |
| Scotland | Roxburghshire | Hawick | |
| Scotland | Inverness | Inverness | Inbhir Nis |
| Scotland | Ayrshire | Irvine | |
| Scotland | Roxburghshire | Jedburgh | |
| Scotland | Moray | Keith | |
| Scotland | Ayrshire | Kilmarnock | |
| Scotland | Fife | Kincardine | |
| Scotland | Inverness-shire | Kingussie | |
| Scotland | Fife | Kirkcaldy | |
| Scotland | Inverness-shire | Mallaig | Malaig |
| Scotland | Argyll | Oban | An t-Òban |
| Scotland | Renfrewshire | Paisley | |
| Scotland | Perthshire | Perth | Peairt |
| Scotland | Aberdeenshire | Peterhead | |
| Scotland | Ross and Cromarty | Skye Bridge | |
| Scotland | Stirlingshire | Stirling | |
| Scotland | Wigtownshire | Stranraer | |
| Scotland | Caithness | Thurso | Inbhir Theòrsa |
| Scotland | Ross and Cromarty | Uig | Uige |
| Scotland | Ross and Cromarty | Ullapool | Ullapul |
| Scotland | Caithness | Wick | Inbhir Ùige |
| Wales | Clwyd | Llangollen | |
| Wales | Clwyd | Mold | Yr Wyddgrug |
| Wales | Clwyd | Queensferry | |
| Wales | Clwyd | Ruthin | Rhuthun |
| Wales | Clwyd | St. Asaph | Llanelwy |
| Wales | Clwyd | Wrexham | Wrecsam |
| Wales | Dyfed | Aberystwyth | |
| Wales | Dyfed | Cardigan | Aberteifi |
| Wales | Dyfed | Carmarthen | Caerfyrddin |
| Wales | Dyfed | Fishguard | Abergwaun |
| Wales | Dyfed | Haverfordwest | Hwlffordd |
| Wales | Dyfed | Llandeilo | |
| Wales | Dyfed | Llandovery | Llanymddyfri |
| Wales | Dyfed | Llanelli | |
| Wales | Dyfed | Milford Haven | Aberdaugleddau |
| Wales | Dyfed | Pembroke Dock | Doc Penfro |
| Wales | Dyfed | St Clears | Sanclêr |
| Wales | Dyfed | Tenby | Dinbich-y-pysgod |
| Wales | Gwent | Abergavenny | Y Fenni |
| Wales | Gwent | Chepstow | Cas-gwent |
| Wales | Gwent | Cwmbran | Cwmbrân |
| Wales | Gwent | Monmouth | Trefynwy |
| Wales | Gwent | Newport | Casnewydd |
| Wales | Gwynedd | Bala | Y Bala |
| Wales | Gwynedd | Bangor | |
| Wales | Gwynedd | Betws-y-coed | |
| Wales | Gwynedd | Caernarfon | |
| Wales | Gwynedd | Conwy | |
| Wales | Gwynedd | Dolgellau | |
| Wales | Gwynedd | Holyhead | Caergybi |
| Wales | Gwynedd | Llandudno | |
| Wales | Gwynedd | Porthmadog | |
| Wales | Mid Glamorgan | Bridgend | Pen-y-bont |
| Wales | Mid Glamorgan | Merthyr Tydfil | Merthyr Tudful |
| Wales | Powys | Brecon | Aberhonddu |
| Wales | Powys | Builth Wells | Llanfair-ym-Muallt |
| Wales | Powys | Llandrindod Wells | Llandrindod |
| Wales | Powys | Llangurig | |
| Wales | Powys | Machynlleth | |
| Wales | Powys | Newtown | Y Drenewydd |
| Wales | Powys | Rhayader | Rhaeadr Gwy |
| Wales | Powys | Welshpool | Y Trallwng |
| Wales | South Glamorgan | Cardiff | Caerdydd |
| Wales | West Glamorgan | Neath | Castell-nedd |
| Wales | West Glamorgan | Port Talbot | |
| Wales | West Glamorgan | Swansea | Abertawe |

=== Northern Ireland ===
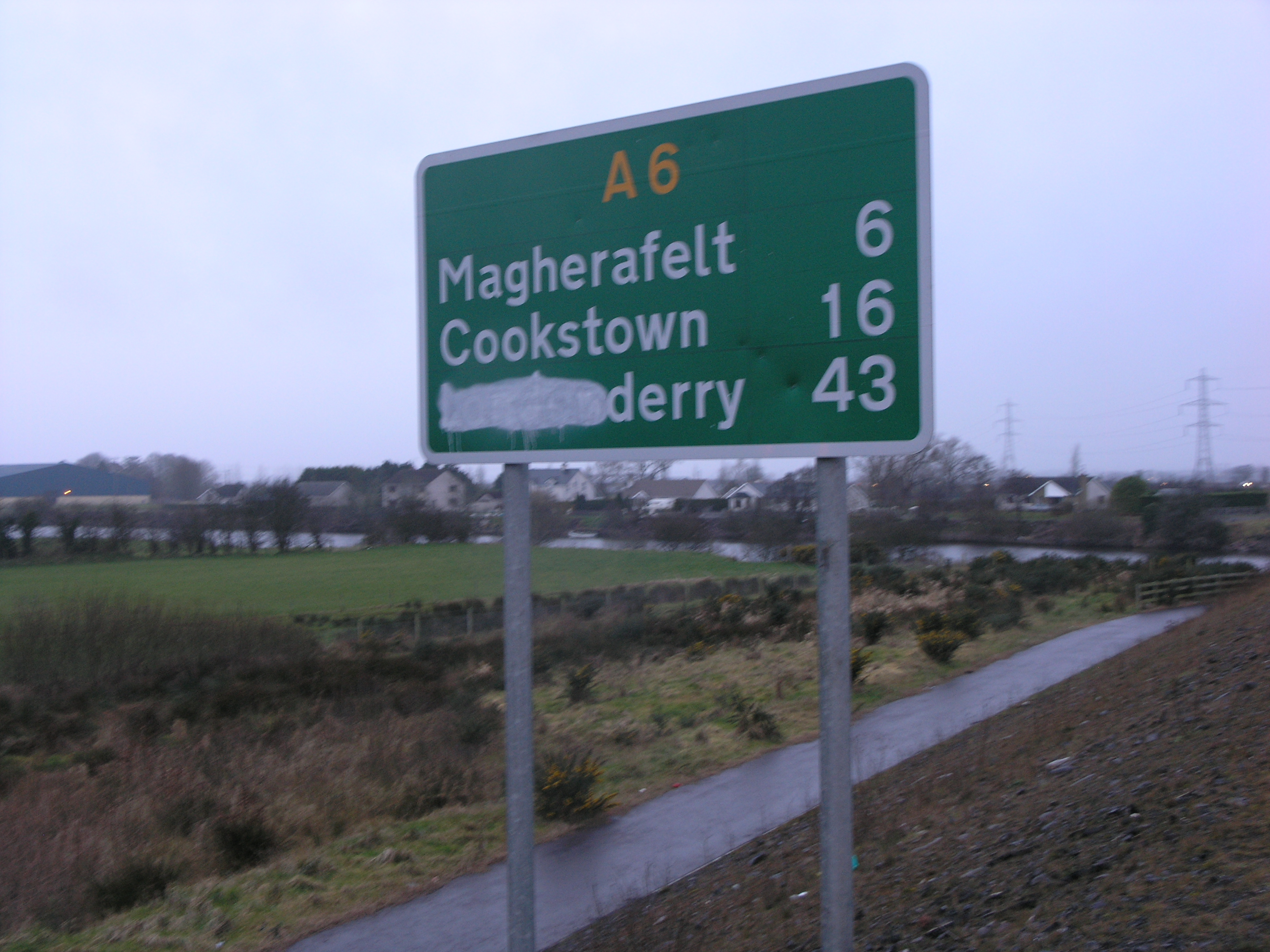
The Derry/Londonderry name dispute has led to controversy over the choice of destination name in Northern Ireland.

Primary destinations in Northern Ireland are published separately from those in Great Britain. The current list is:

- Antrim
- Armagh
- Ballymena
- Bangor
- Belfast
- Belfast Airport
- Carrickfergus
- Coleraine
- Cookstown
- Craigavon
- Derry
- Downpatrick
- Dungannon
- Enniskillen
- Larne
- Lisburn
- Newcastle
- Newry
- Newtownards
- Omagh
- Strabane
- Warrenpoint
