= Harlequin Theatre, Northwich =

Harlequin Theatre
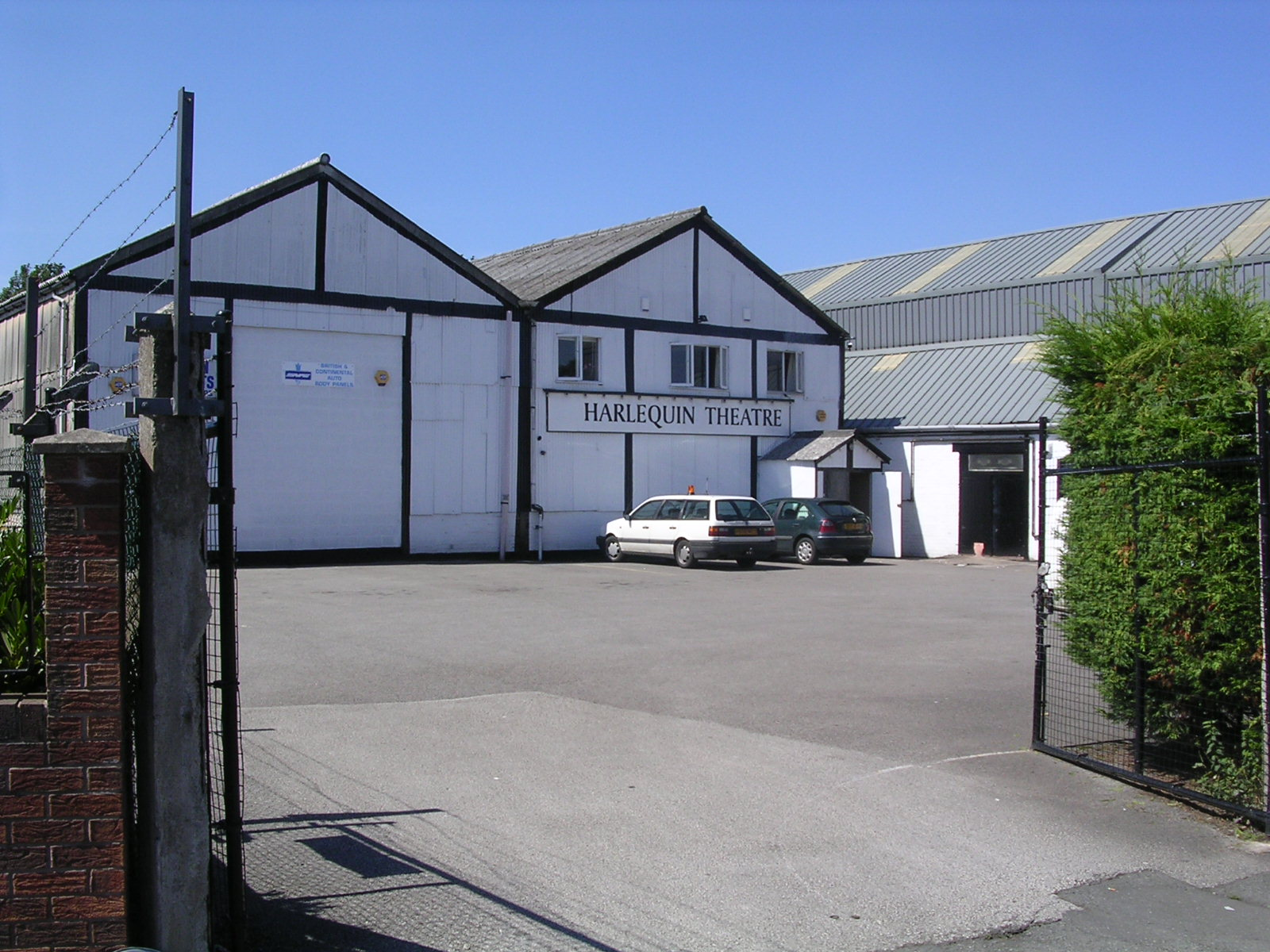
- The Harlequin Theatre
- Interactive map of Harlequin Theatre
- Address: Queen Street; Northwich, Cheshire; England
- Coordinates: 53.257°N 2.514°W

Website
- harlequinplayers.com

Harlequin Theatre is a theatre in Northwich, Cheshire, and hosts plays by The Harlequin Players Club. It is also home to Northwich Folk Club.

Harlequin Theatre produces six full-length plays every year and occasional studio nights and one-act play evenings. There is a monthly Club Night for new and existing members.

In addition, the theatre is hired out for concerts and other performance events.

Located halfway along Queen Street, the theatre has tiered seating for 96 patrons, parking, wheelchair access, an audio induction loop and bar.
