= List of parks and open spaces in Cheshire =

This is a list of parks and open spaces in the ceremonial county of Cheshire. It includes urban parks, country parks, islands, woodlands, commons, lakes, walking trails, local nature reserves and other green spaces that are open to the public. Small neighbourhood parks and pocket parks are not included.

== Parks and open spaces in Cheshire ==
Name	Image	Location	Type	Notes	Refs
Astbury Mere Country Park		West Heath, Congleton	Country park, lake	Country park surrounding a fishing and boating lake, with grassland and woodland, on the site of a former sand quarry	
Bickerton Hill		Bickerton	Hills	Two hills, lowland heath and woodland; includes an Iron Age hill fort, Maiden Castle. Falls within an Area of Special County Value and parts are Sites of Special Scientific Interest; much of the southern hill is managed by the National Trust	
Birchwood Forest Park		Birchwood	Urban park	Grassland, woodland, sports pitches	
Burton Mere Wetlands		Dee Estuary	RSPB reserve	Managed by the RSPB as a reserve for birdlife	
The Carrs Park		Wilmslow	Urban park	Along the banks of the River Bollin	
Castle Park		Frodsham	Urban park	In the grounds of Castle Park House	
Countess of Chester Country Park		Chester	Country park	Adjacent to the Countess of Chester Hospital	
Delamere Forest		Delamere	Woodlands and lakes	Open forest around Blakemere Moss (lake)	
Dutton Locks		Dutton	Historic canal locks	Green spaces along the towpath of the River Weaver and at the canal locks	
Grappenhall Heys Walled Garden		Warrington	Walled garden	Ponds, garden and glasshouses	
Grosvenor Park		Chester	Urban park	Victorian park including Billy Hobby's Well, three medieval arches, a café, miniature railway and a rockery	
Helsby Hill		Helsby	Hill	Managed by the National Trust, overlooking the town	
Lindow Common		Wilmslow	Heathland	Local nature reserve and SSSI, managed by Cheshire East Council	
Lindow Moss		Wilmslow	Peat bog	Partly owned by Cheshire Wildlife Trust	
Lymm Dam		Lymm	Lake	Lake, woodland and open spaces	
Macclesfield Forest		Macclesfield Forest and Wildboarclough	Woodland	Woodland, plantation and two reservoirs. Parts are a nature reserve and a Site of Biological Importance, and two-thirds falls within the Peak District	
Marbury Country Park		Northwich	Country park	Woodland and open spaces	
Moore Nature Reserve		Moore	Local nature reserve	Lakes for birdwatching and walking routes	
Mount Manisty		Ellesmere Port	Mound	Uninhabited area	
Ness Botanic Gardens		Ness	Botanic gardens	Specimen trees and flowers	
Northwich Woodlands		Northwich	Various	A number of different open spaces	
Orford Park		Warrington	Urban park	Former grounds of Orford Hall, with pond and sports pitches	
Paddington Meadows		Warrington	Local nature reserve	Along the banks of the River Mersey	
Phoenix Park		Runcorn	Urban park	Woodland, canal and open spaces	
Queens Park		Crewe	Urban park	Grade II* listed	
Risley Moss		Warrington	Peat bog	Nature reserve and bird watching	
Rivacre Valley		Ellesmere Port	Local nature reserve	Woodland and meadow	
Rixton Clay Pits		Hollins Green	Pools	Former clay pits, with ponds, grassland, scrub, woodland; part is an SSSI and local nature reserve	
Sankey Valley Park		Warrington	Canal	Linear park, following Sankey Brook and Sankey Canal	
Shakerley Mere		Allostock	Lake	Former gravel pit with circular walk	
Sound Heath		Sound	Heathland, ponds	Common with heathland, woodland and ponds; SSSI and local nature reserve	
Spike Island		Widnes	Park	Open parkland with industrial archaeological history and a canal	
Stanlow Island		Ellesmere Port	Island	Became an island during construction of the Manchester Ship Canal. Occupied until the 1990s when the locals left due to isolation and the hazards of living near the refinery. Remains of Stanlow Abbey on site.	
Tatton Park		Knutsford	Parkland	The parkland associated with Tatton Hall, freely accessible, entry to the house, gardens or car park requires a fee	
Tegg's Nose Country Park		near Macclesfield	Country park	Hill, meadow, moorland, woodland, reservoirs; display of historical quarrying equipment	
Town Park		Runcorn	Urban park	Green space with dry ski slope	
Victoria Park		Widnes	Urban park	Main urban park with listed war memorial pillar	
Victoria Park		Warrington	Urban park	On the banks of the River Mersey with athletics stadium	
Walton Hall		Warrington	Park and formal gardens	With zoo, events and leisure activities	
Walton Lea Walled Garden		Warrington	Walled garden	Managed by a charity	
Whitby Park		Ellesmere Port	Urban park	Premier park in the town	
Wigg Island		Runcorn	Park and nature reserve	Walking, nature and bird hides	
Whitegate Way		Whitegate	Footpath	Walking and cycling path on disused railway line	
Woolston Park		Warrington	Park	Grassland, playing fields, brook	
Wybunbury Moss		Wybunbury	Peat bog	National Nature Reserve with permitted path access; owned and managed by Natural England	

== See also ==
- List of Sites of Special Scientific Interest in Cheshire
- Recreational walks in Cheshire
