= Marbury Country Park =

Country park in Cheshire, England

Coordinates: 53.280°N 2.527°W

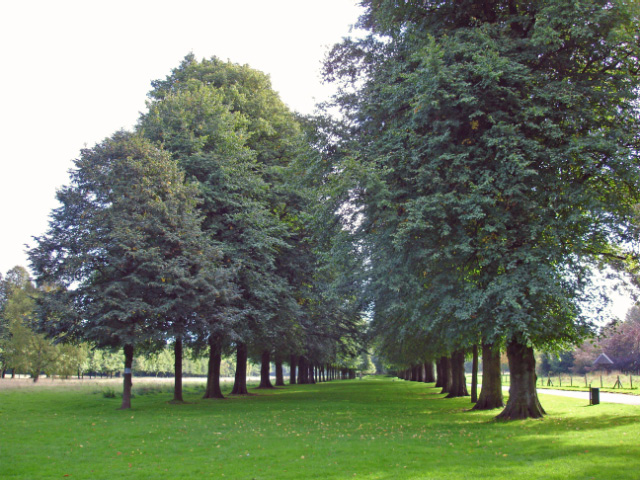
Lime tree avenue in park

Marbury Country Park is a country park in Cheshire, England. It lies in the heart of Northwich Community Woodlands, an integral part of the Mersey Forest. Former industrial land is gradually being transformed to create a rich and green environment stretching from Marbury to Northwich.

Many of the features of the Country Park, including the lime avenues and the arboretum, are a legacy of the days when Marbury was a grand estate. The last Marbury Hall, built in the 1850s, was a fine-looking house modelled on the French chateau at Fontainebleau, with an imposing carriage drive entrance.

Originally owned by the Smith-Barry family, the hall became a country club in the 1930s, and then a POW camp during WWII. After this the hall served as a hostel for ICI employees during its considerable post-war expansion and some of the POW camp huts persisted as accommodation for the workforce. By the 1960s the hall had fallen into disrepair and was demolished. The history of the hall was told in a community play in 2002.

The Friends of Anderton and Marbury (FOAM) are a group involved with looking after both parks and organising walks, talks, conservation tasks and events.

== See also ==
- Marbury Hall, Anderton with Marbury
- Marbury Reedbed Nature Reserve
- List of parks and open spaces in Cheshire
