= Phoenix Park (disambiguation) =

Phoenix Park is a large urban park in Dublin, Ireland.

Phoenix Park may also refer to:

== Parks ==
- Phoenix Park, Runcorn, Cheshire, England
- Phoenix Park, Thurnscoe, South Yorkshire, England
- Phoenix Civic Space Park, Phoenix, Arizona, United States
- Phoenix Park (Eau Claire, Wisconsin), United States

== Other uses ==
- Phoenix Park F.C., former English football club in Bradford, England
- Phoenix Trotting Park, former horse racing track in Goodyear, Arizona, United States
- Phoenix Park Racecourse, racecourse in Dublin adjacent to Phoenix Park
- Phoenix Park tram stop, Nottingham, England
- New Phoenix Park, headquarters of the Ministry of Home Affairs (Singapore)

== See also ==
- Phoenix Park Murders
