= Anderton with Marbury =

Civil parish in Cheshire, England

Coordinates: 53.275°N 2.528°W

- The Anderton Boat Lift

- Location within Cheshire
- OS grid reference: SJ648755
- Civil parish: Anderton with Marbury
- Unitary authority: Cheshire West and Chester
- Ceremonial county: Cheshire
- Region: North West
- Country: England
- Sovereign state: United Kingdom
- Post town: NORTHWICH
- Postcode district: CW9
- Dialling code: 01606
- Police: Cheshire
- Fire: Cheshire
- Ambulance: North West
- UK Parliament: Tatton

Anderton with Marbury is a civil parish in the unitary authority of Cheshire West and Chester and the ceremonial county of Cheshire, England. It had a population of 582 according to the 2001 census, reducing slightly to 571 at the 2011 Census, and includes the villages of Anderton and Marbury. The eastern part of the parish lies in the Northwich Community Woodlands which includes Marbury Country Park, situated in the grounds of the old Marbury Hall, and Anderton Nature Park.

Anderton is known for the Victorian Anderton Boat Lift, which was the model for other European boat lifts. It is fully restored and raises boats 50 feet (15 m) from the River Weaver to the Trent and Mersey Canal.

== See also ==
- Listed buildings in Anderton with Marbury
