= Astbury Mere =

Lake and country park in Congleton, Cheshire, England

Coordinates: 53°09′32″N 2°13′46″W

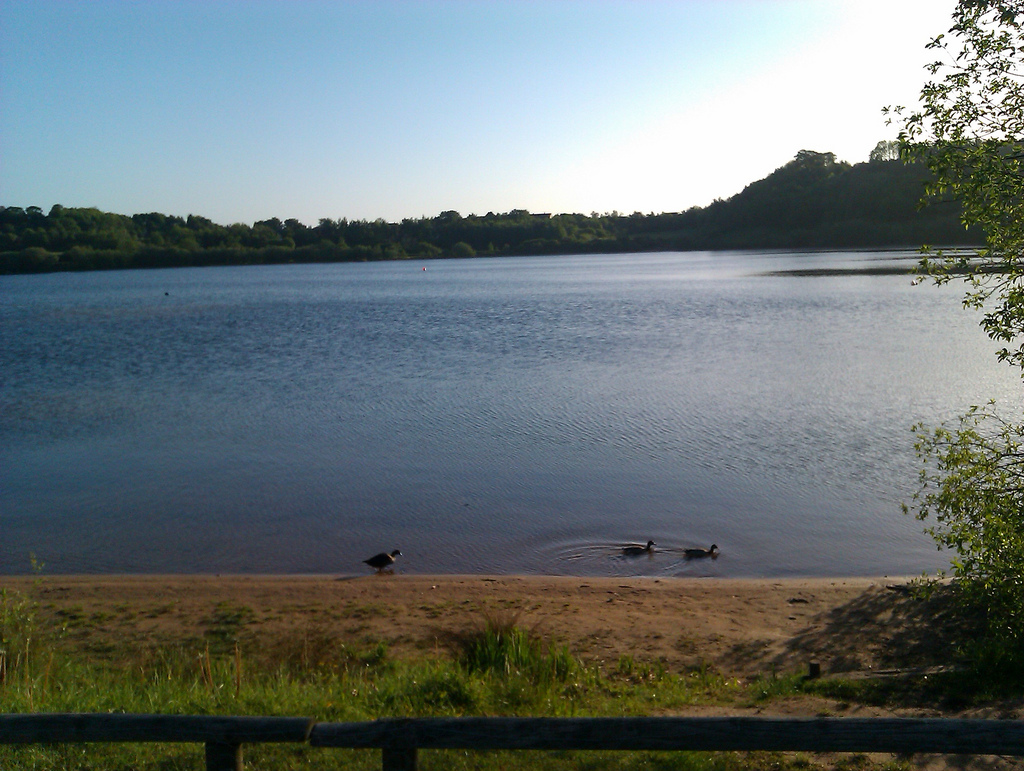
Astbury Mere

Astbury Mere is a lake and open area in West Heath, a suburb of Congleton, Cheshire, England, in an area formerly quarried for silica sand. Part of the area is accredited by Natural England as a country park, Astbury Mere Country Park. The country park has an area of 14 hectares (35 acres) and the lake covers 43 acres (17 ha). The park is owned by Astbury Mere Trust, and the lake and its banks by Stoke-on-Trent Angling Society.

== History ==
Extraction of silica sand occurred at the Congleton West Heath quarry from around the 1930s until 1984. The sand was used for making glass and for precision casting of metal. In September 1967, the Congleton Chronicle reported local opposition to further sand quarrying around Astbury, including complaints from residents about dust and arguments from footpath campaigners that diverted footpaths should be restored once quarrying ceased. After the closure of the quarry, the site was divided into housing (Ennerdale Drive estate) and open space. A trust was established in 1989 to manage the open land. The park first opened to the public in 1991. In 2002, the Stoke-on-Trent Angling Society acquired the lake. By 2008 the Astbury Mere Trust had acquired the majority of the land. The park was accredited by Natural England as a country park in 2012.

In 2004, the Court of Appeal decided Rhind v Astbury Water Park Ltd [2004] EWCA Civ 756, a personal injury claim arising from a diving incident at Astbury Mere, and dismissed the appeal. In reaching its decision, the court referred to Tomlinson v Congleton BC [2003] UKHL 47, which concerned Brereton Heath Country Park near Brereton, also in the Congleton area.

== Location and description ==
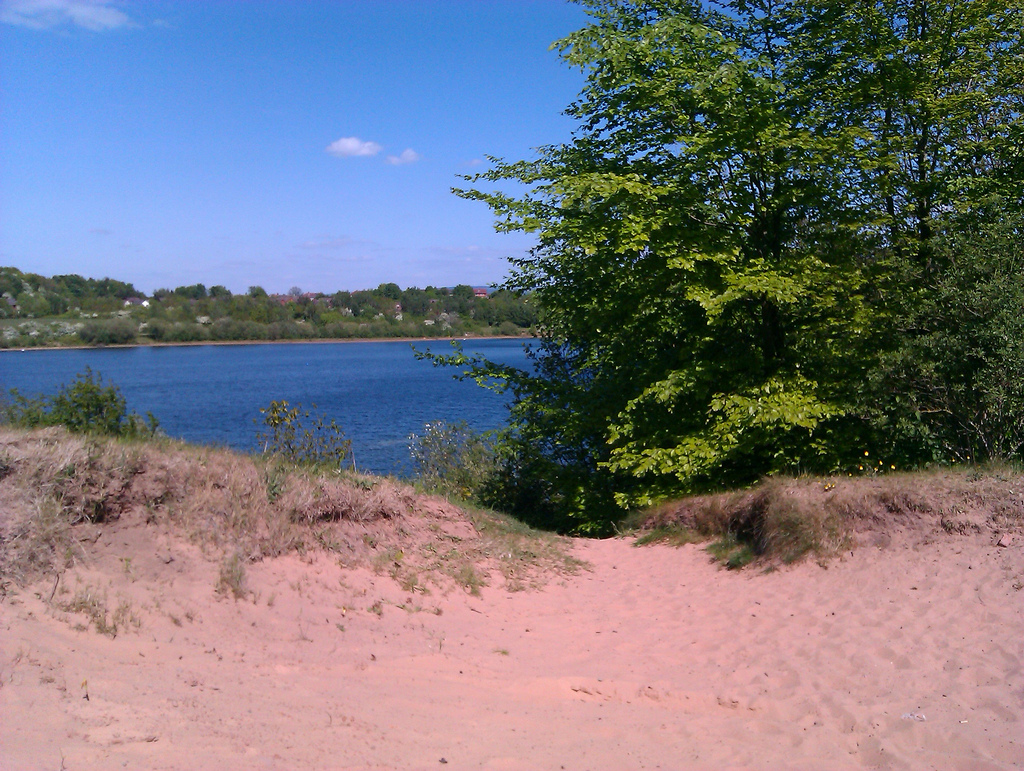
Entrance to Astbury Mere Country Park

The park is located at around SJ846627 on Sandy Lane, off the A34 (Newcastle Road). The Fol Hollow road adjoins the park. The area forms a shallow bowl, centred on Astbury Mere, with surrounding grassland, woodland and plantation, as well as a community orchard, originally planted by local schoolchildren. The lake has an area of 43 acres (17 ha) with a maximum depth of around 50 feet (15 m).

== Amenities ==
Activities in the park include walking, orienteering and running. Two walking trails are available, each a mile long; one is suitable for wheelchairs and pushchairs. Dogs are permitted. Seats are placed every 100 metres along the lake circuit. A permanent orienteering course is available. A parkrun is organised on Saturdays at 9am. Various watersports occur on the lake, including fishing, sailing, windsurfing, canoeing and kayaking; swimming is not permitted. Fishing is organised by Stoke-on-Trent Angling Society; the lake is stocked with carp, perch, pike and roach.

There is a visitor centre with car parking. Snacks and drinks are available. The park is managed by Cheshire East Council Countryside Ranger Service for the Astbury Mere Trust, with a single part-time ranger.

== Fence ==
In 2022, a dog attack on a swan at Astbury Mere was reported, in response, the Stoke-on-Trent Angling Society installed security fencing. In 2026 the society began installing an expanded perimeter security fence around the lake, which some residents and the Astbury Mere Trust criticised as being installed without consultation. The society said the fencing was intended to protect swans and prevent wild swimming and related anti-social behaviour. The Trust also said that climbing plants on the fence line included an invasive species (Henry's honeysuckle).

== Public footpath ==
Public Footpath No. 10 in the parish of Congleton (FP10) is part of the local public rights of way network administered by Cheshire East Council. In 2012, the council's Public Rights of Way Committee approved the diversion of part of FP10 under section 119 of the Highways Act 1980; the committee report described the affected section as terminating near Astbury Mere lake and recorded that the proposed new route followed an existing permissive path.

== See also ==
- List of parks and open spaces in Cheshire
- Shakerley Mere, another Cheshire mere that originated in a sand quarry
