= Shakerley Mere =

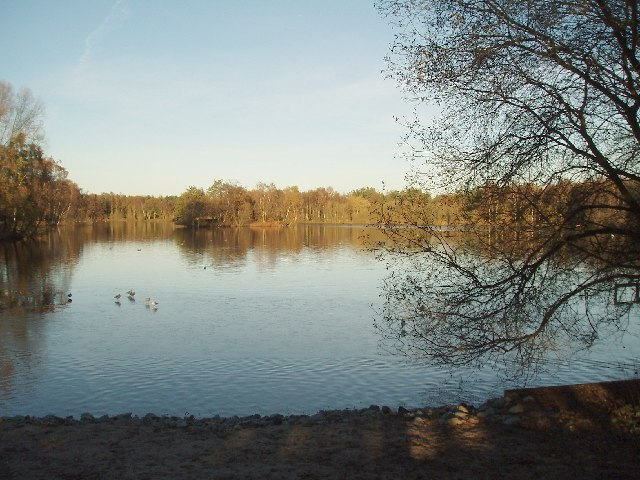
- Shakerley Mere from the south

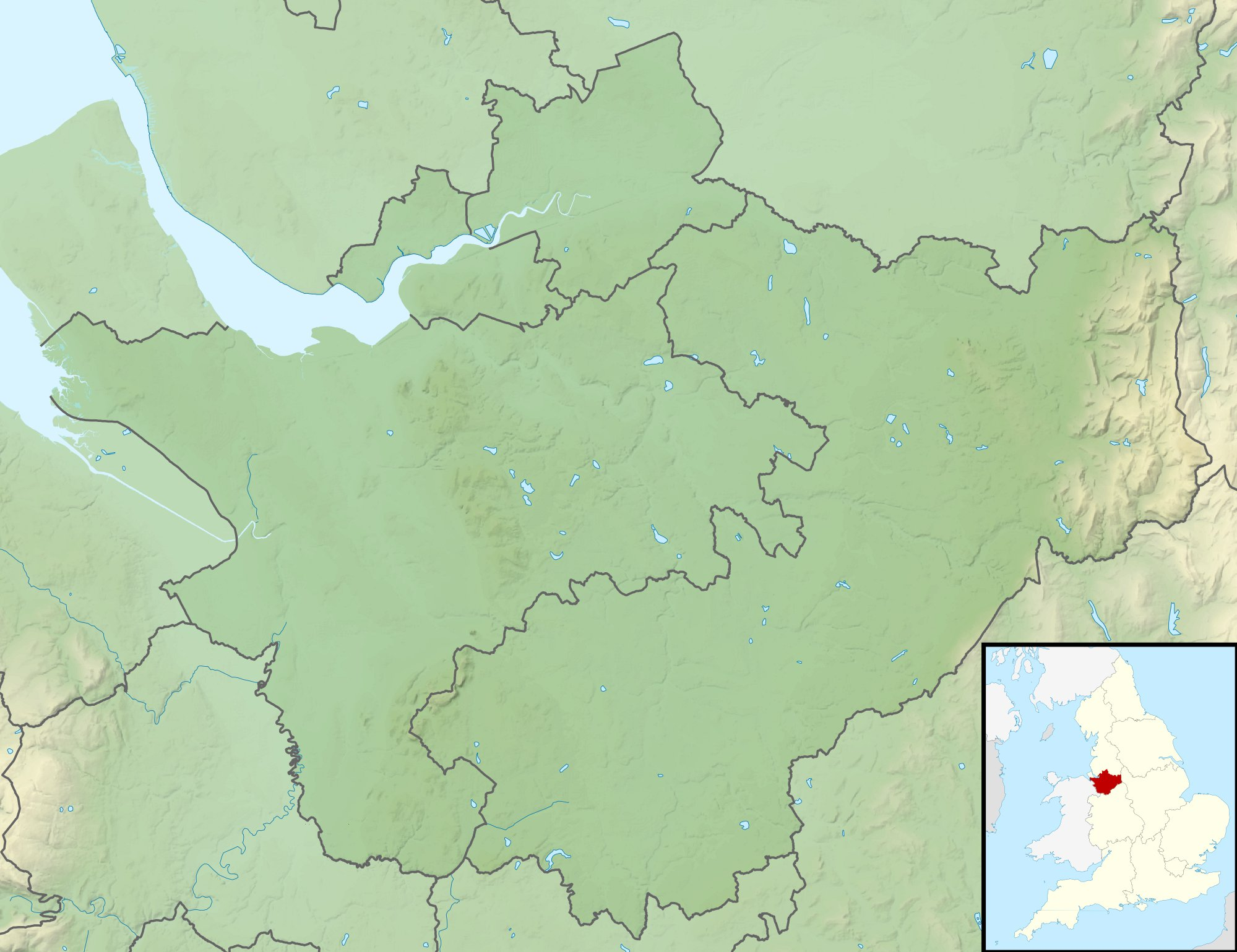
- Location within Cheshire
- Location: Allostock, Cheshire
- Coordinates: 53.236077°N 2.402643°W
- Type: Quarry lake
- Managing agency: Cheshire West and Chester Unitary Authority
- First flooded: 1960s
- Surface area: 17 acres (6.9 ha)
- Surface elevation: 45 metres (148 ft)

Shakerley Mere is a lake and recreation area near Allostock, Cheshire, England. The mere is a former sand quarry, which flooded after extraction ended in the 1960s. Roughly triangular in shape, it bounded to the east by the M6 motorway and on the other two sides by the B5081 and B5082 roads. The site is managed for recreation by Cheshire West and Chester Council. There is a small amount of heathland, a designated site of biological importance, in the southeast corner, and a circular path runs around the perimeter of the lake, a distance of 0.9 miles (1.4 km).

The fishing rights are leased by Lymm Angling Club (the lake is stocked with carp, bream, roach and perch). In 2014 a small number of introduced bighead and silver carp were removed from the water.

== See also ==
- List of parks and open spaces in Cheshire
- Astbury Mere, another Cheshire mere that originated in a sand quarry
