= Countess of Chester Country Park =

Country park in Upton, Cheshire, England

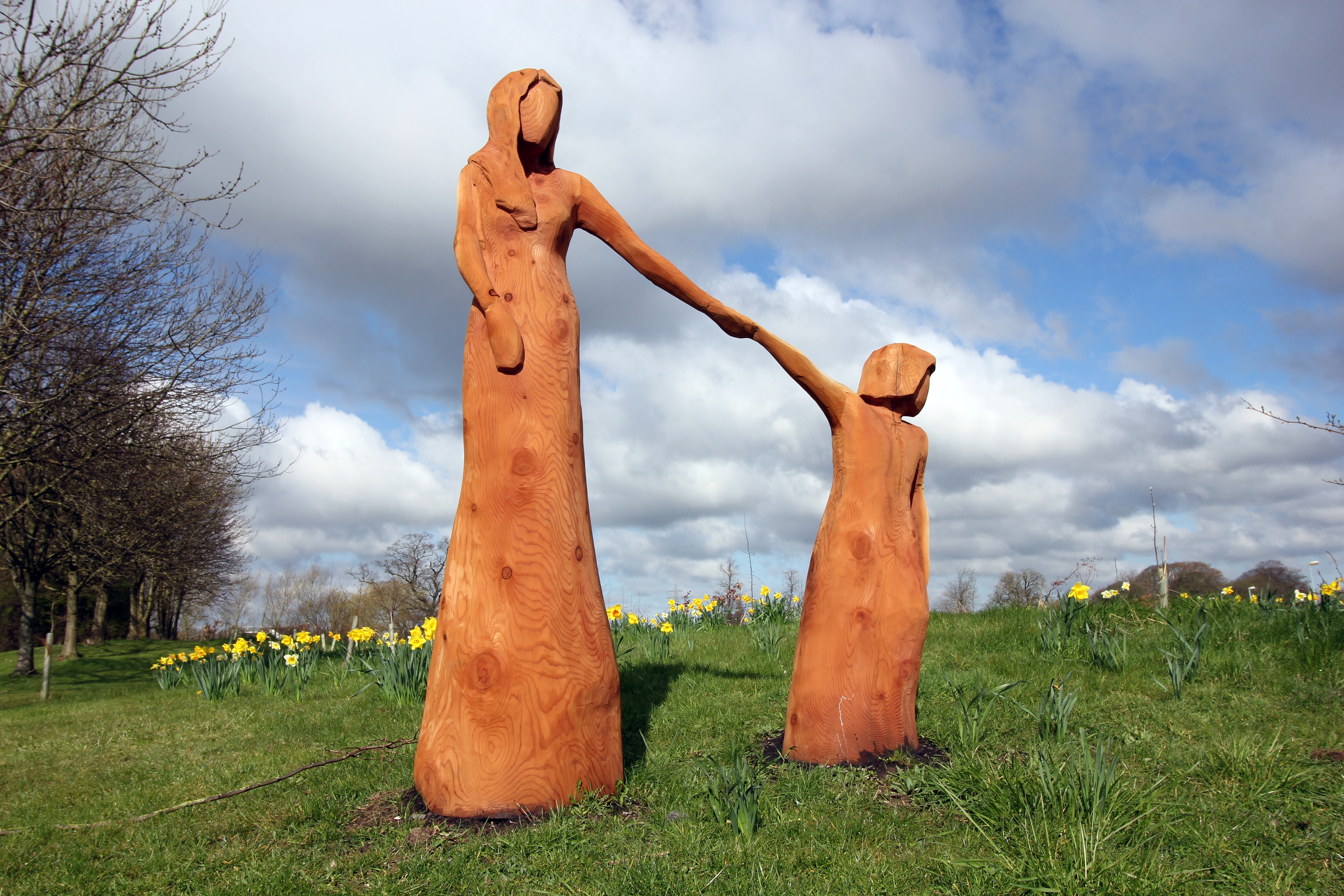
- Wooden carved statue at the entrance
- Interactive map of Countess of Chester Country Park
- Type: Country Park
- Location: Upton, Chester, Cheshire, England.
- Coordinates: 53.2075°N 2.9017°W
- Area: 19 ha (47 acres)
- Operator: The Land Trust
- Open: All year

The Countess of Chester Country Park is a country park in Upton, Chester, Cheshire, England. It is named after the adjacent Countess of Chester Hospital.

== History ==
The country park is a former landfill site which was given to a national charity called The Land Trust by the Homes and Communities Agency in 2012 along with £650,000 to convert the site. Additional funding was provided by WREN, a not-for-profit organisation that gives grants for community work. Natural England's Paths for Communities and the Local Sustainable Transport Fund gave funding to build paths and improve access to Chester town centre, the Hospital and the adjacent Shropshire Union Canal. The park was designed by John Seiler of Cheshire West and Chester Council and opened to the public in June 2014. It was formally opened by Camilla, Duchess of Cornwall(also known as Countess of Chester) in September 2014.

== Facilities ==
The park has a memorial forest allowing bereaved people to plant a tree in memory of a family member. The park has an area of 19 hectares.

=== Health activities ===
The park takes its name from the hospital and endeavours to promote health and physical exercise. There are a range of activities including an outdoor gym, guided 'health' walks and Chester Parkrun takes place every Saturday morning.

== See also ==
- List of parks and open spaces in Cheshire
