= Marbury Reedbed Nature Reserve =

Nature Reserve in England

Coordinates: 53.2865°N 2.5256°W

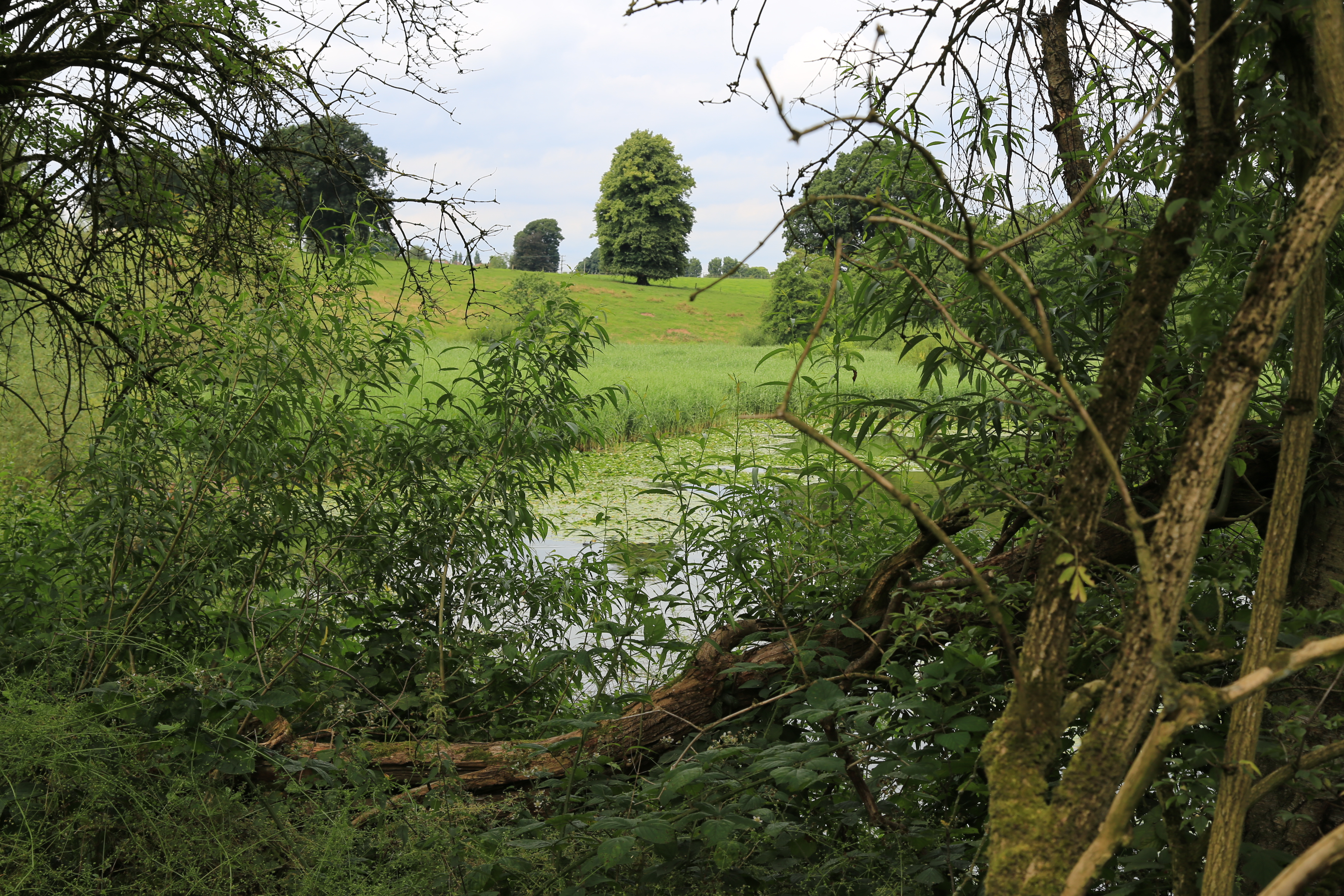
The western end of the mere seen from Marbury Country Park

Marbury Reedbed Nature Reserve is a 6-hectare (15-acre) nature reserve located at the western end of Budworth Mere, north of Northwich, Cheshire, England. It is managed by the Cheshire Wildlife Trust under lease from the Royal Society for Nature Conservation, which purchased the land by public subscription in 1934 as a memorial to the Cheshire naturalist Thomas Coward.

The reserve, which is adjacent to Marbury Country Park, contains a range of habitats, with the reedbed, carr woodland and semi-natural broadleaved woodland demonstrating the various stages of hydrosere succession (a gradual change from open water to woodland). The open water contains a rich selection of plants, including water lilies, and provides valuable feeding and breeding habitat for kingfishers, little grebes and great crested grebes. The reedbed is almost exclusively composed of common reed and is a residence for summer birds such as reed and sedge warblers. In recent years the reedbed has been used as an over-wintering site by bittern, and the trust manages the reedbed for this secretive heron by cutting glades through the reeds to allow better feeding opportunities. The diminutive and shy lesser spotted woodpecker has also been seen occasionally in the reserve's woodlands.
