= Rivacre Valley =

Park in Ellesmere Port, Cheshire, England

Rivacre Valley Country Park
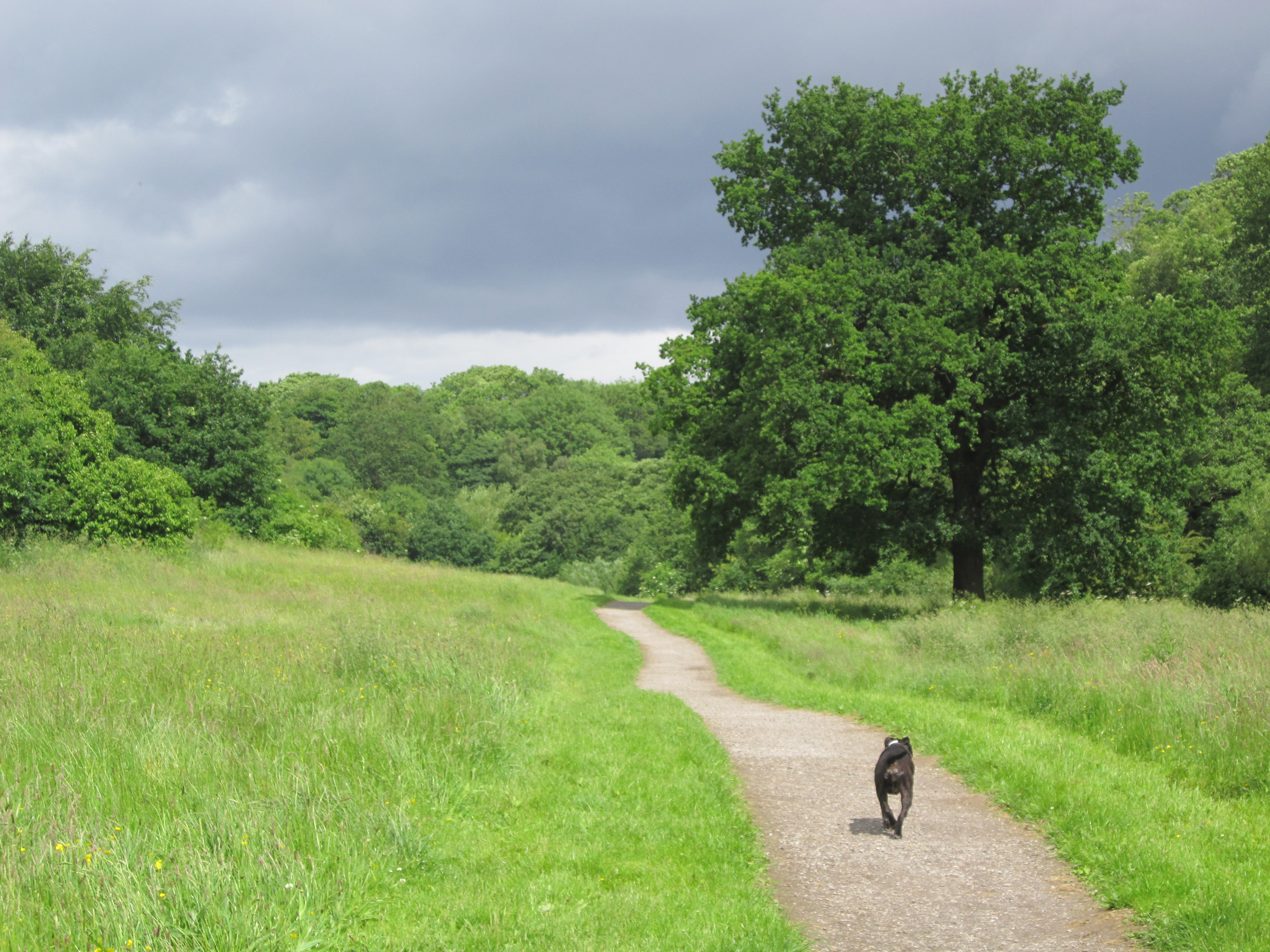
- Rivacre Valley Country Park
- Interactive map of Rivacre Valley Country Park
- Type: Public park
- Location: Ellesmere Port, Cheshire
- Coordinates: 53.29°N 2.93°W
- Area: 300 acres (120 ha)
- Operator: Cheshire West and Chester
- Open: All year
- Status: Open
- Website: Your Ellesmere Port: Rivacre Valley Local Nature Reserve

Rivacre Valley is an area of parkland and woodland in Ellesmere Port, Cheshire, England. Named after the Rivacre Brook which runs through a valley in this area, the park is an established wildlife habitat and local nature reserve. The park is over 300 acres (1.2 km^{2}) and comprises meadow and several areas of woodland. Church Wood, to the north west, is separated from the rest of the park by a golf course. The site also features an orienteering course.

== History ==
Rivacre Valley was most well known for having an outdoor swimming pool until the 1980s, with large ornamental gardens, cafe, children's playground and fountains, situated along the Rivacre Brook itself. Opened in 1934, Rivacre Baths had a main pool and a smaller shallow pool arranged in a 'T' shape. The attraction was particularly popular between the 1950s and 1970s. By the 1980s its popularity had declined due to competition from the year-round indoor heated swimming pools at the nearby EPIC leisure centre and the Northgate Arena in Chester. In a bad state of repair, Rivacre Baths finally closed in early 1981 and was demolished in 1985. The site is now part of the nature reserve.

== See also ==
- List of parks and open spaces in Cheshire
