= Thomas Mottershead =

English recipient of the Victoria Cross

- Born: 17 January 1892; Widnes, Lancashire, England
- Died: 12 January 1917 (aged 24); Bailleul, France
- Burial place: Bailleul Communal Cemetery Extension
- Military career
- Allegiance: United Kingdom
- Branch: Royal Flying Corps
- Service years: 1914 - 1917
- Rank: Sergeant
- Units: No. 20 Squadron
- Conflicts: World War I †: Battle of the Somme
- Awards: Victoria Cross; Distinguished Conduct Medal

Thomas Mottershead VC, DCM (17 January 1892 – 12 January 1917) was an English recipient of the Victoria Cross, the highest and most prestigious award for gallantry in the face of the enemy that can be awarded to British and Commonwealth forces.

== Background ==
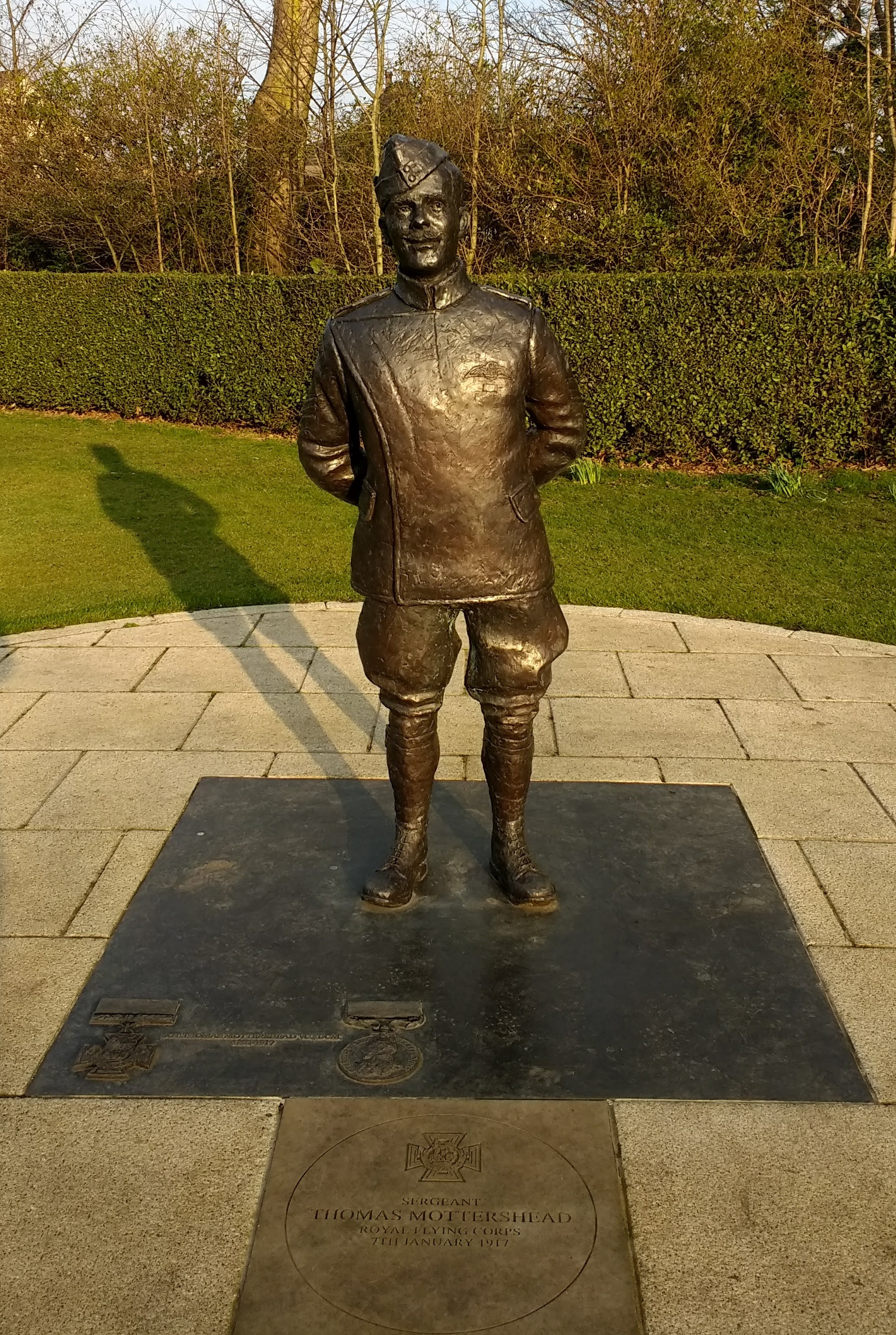
Statue of Mottershead in Victoria Park, Widnes.

Thomas Mottershead was born in Widnes, Lancashire on 17 January 1892. He was the son of Thomas and Lucy Mottershead. He studied engineering at Widnes Technical School and was apprenticed as a fitter and turner after leaving school. In February 1914, he married Lilian Medlicott Bree and the couple had a son, Sydney, the following year. Mottershead was living at 31 Lilac Avenue in Widnes and working as a garage mechanic when World War I began. He enlisted in the Royal Flying Corps on 10 August 1914 as a mechanic, He was posted to the Central Flying school at Upavon and was promoted to Sergeant on 1 April 1916.

In May 1916 he began pilot training and 9 June of that year he obtained his Flying Certificate. He was posted to No.25 Squadron at St Omer, flying the FE 2, on 6 July 1916 and saw action in the Battle of the Somme.

== Distinguished Conduct Medal ==
One of his first operations was low-level bombing raid on a German anti-aircraft battery which he successfully destroyed. On 22 September, with 2/Lt C. Street as observer he bombed the railway station at Samain, destroying one ammunition train and strafing another. While climbing away from the target, their aircraft was attacked by a Fokker scout. Accounts of the engagement indicate that it was Mottershead's skillful manoeuvring which enabled Street to shoot the enemy aircraft down. For this action and other displays of gallantry, Sgt Mottershead was awarded the Distinguished Conduct Medal and promoted to the rank of Flight Sgt.

Undocumented accounts state that Mottershead and another No. 25 Squadron pilot landed on a German airfield, allowing their gunners to shoot up the hangars before taking off and escaping. The reputed date and location seem to remain unknown, but he was then transferred to No.20 Squadron at Clairmarais aerodrome.

== Victoria Cross ==
On 7 January 1917 near Ploegsteert Wood, Belgium, Sergeant Mottershead was on patrol in FE-2d (serial number A39) with observer Lt. Willian Edward Gower when he was engaged in combat by two Albatros D.III of Jasta 8. Lt Gower managed to hit one and put it out of the action, the second Albatros however, flown by German 'ace' Leutnant Walter Göttsch (20 victories), hit Mottershead's aircraft, with the petrol tank pierced and the machine was set on fire. Enveloped in flames which his observer was unable to subdue with a handheld fire extinguisher, the Sergeant was badly burned but nevertheless managed to take his aircraft back to the Allied lines and made a successful forced landing. The undercarriage collapsed on touching the ground however, throwing the observer clear but pinning Mottershead in his cockpit. He was subsequently rescued but died of burns to his face, arms and thighs five days later in Number 8 Casualty Clearing Station, Bailleul.

Mottershead received the only V.C. ever awarded to a non-commissioned RFC officer during the First World War. The medal was presented to Mottershead's widow Lilian by King George V in a ceremony in Hyde Park, London on 2 June 1917.

Lt Gower, 26, a pre-war railway engineering draughtsman from 62 Arthur Street, Derby, suffered severe facial burns and spent some eight-months recuperating prior to being transferred as an instructor to Palestine. He survived the war, and in May 1917 received the Military Cross from the King for his efforts to help Sgt Motterhead by spraying him with the aircraft's fire extinguisher, despite being on fire himself. Lt Gower had joined the Army in 1914 and had served at the Battle of the Somme with the Sherwood Foresters as an infantry officer. He was Mentioned in Despatches.

=== Citation ===
For most conspicuous bravery, endurance and skill, when attacked at an altitude of 9,000 feet; the petrol tank was pierced and the machine set on fire. Enveloped in flames, which his Observer, Lt. Gower was unable to subdue, this very gallant soldier succeeded in bringing his aeroplane back to our lines, and though he made a successful landing, the machine collapsed on touching the ground, pinning him beneath wreckage from which he was subsequently rescued. Though suffering extreme torture from burns, Sgt. Mottershead showed the most conspicuous presence of mind in the careful selection of a landing place, and his wonderful endurance and fortitude undoubtedly saved the life of his Observer. He has since succumbed to his injuries.

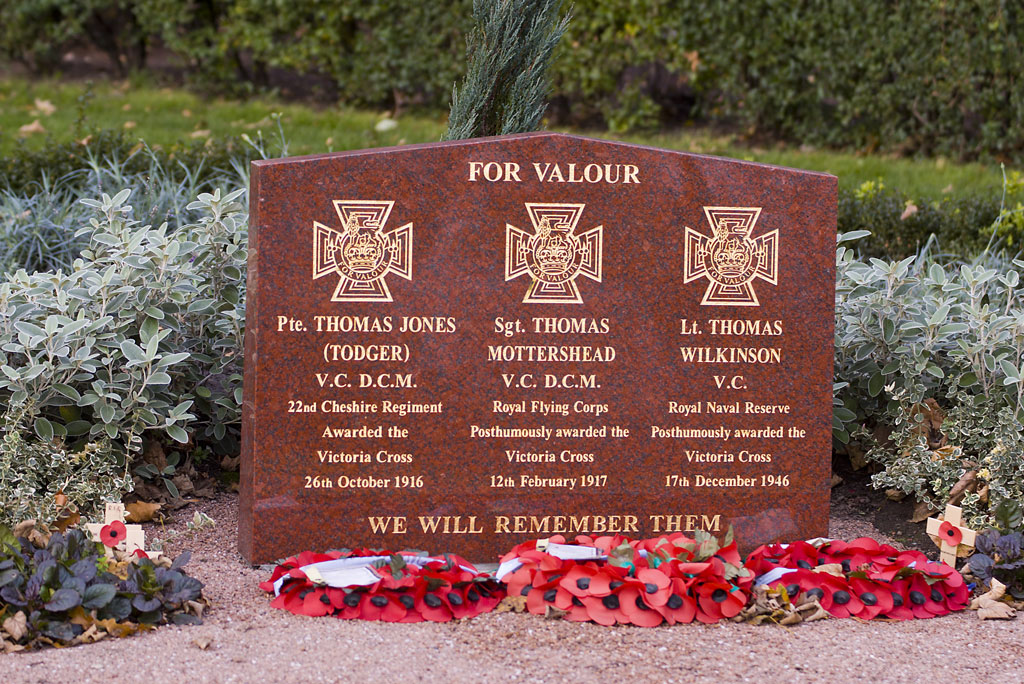
Memorial in Victoria Park, Widnes

== Memorial Fund Concert ==
On Wednesday, 11 April 1917 the Mayor of Widnes held a concert in the Premier Picture House for the "Memorial Fund to the late Sergeant T. Mottershead V.C, D.C.M"

The flyer for that concert included a 'TRIBUTE TO "A VERY GALLANT SOLDIER"', by Amanda Bebbington, also published in the "Weekly News" on 16 February 1917.

TRIBUTE TO "A VERY GALLANT SOLDIER"

If I strove to tell this story as such story should be told,
I should write in jewel letters on a leaf of shining gold;
With a diamond pen to shrine each word as crystal as a tear,
And a blood-red fire of rubies to flash the record clear.

Oh! I cannot tell this story, for the flame is in my heart,
And my soul's afire with a vision of the mighty hero-part;
And I spill the diamonds, in tears, that blind my mortal eyes
As I dream the horror of that flight through the unpitying skies.

Oh! A nation's heart beats quicker with a proud exultant glow;
For such deeds as these can thrill her through her agony of woe.
And the England that doth render him her amplest meed of fame
Counts richest jewel in her crown her brave son's honoured name.

I leave the story all untold - too feeble are my words.
The ocean's diapason and the storm wind's thundering chords,
The very stars that strew the heavens, the suns that ceaseless roll
Shall sing and blaze the brighter since they keep that hero-soul.

(Amanda Bebbington, in the "Weekly News", 16 February 1917)

== Statue ==
On 1 April 2018 a statue commemorating Mottershead was unveiled in Victoria Park, Widnes.
