= Victoria Park, Widnes =

Park in Widnes, England

Victoria Park
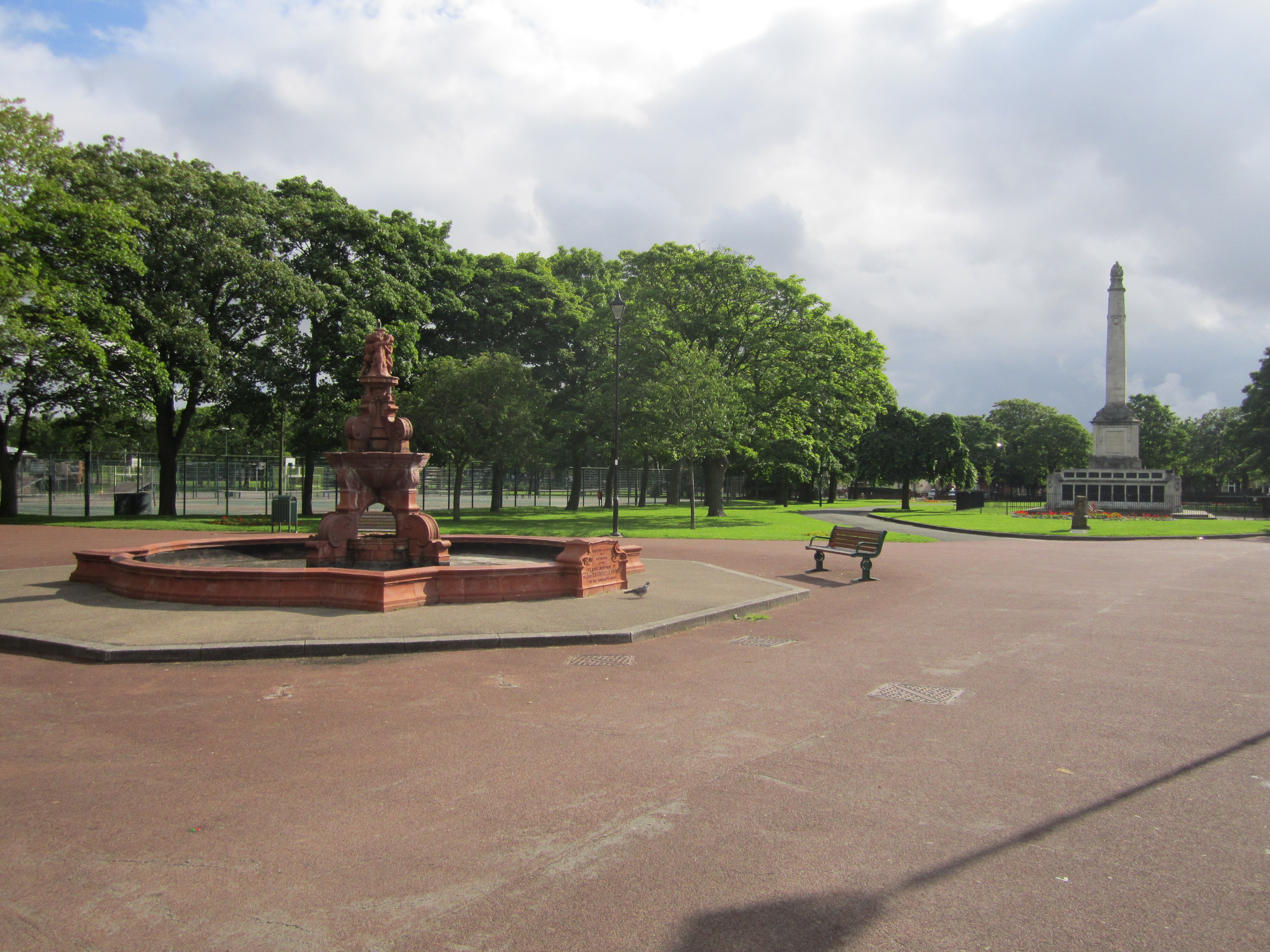
- Interactive map of Victoria Park
- Type: Urban park
- Location: Widnes, Cheshire, England
- Coordinates: 53.375°N 2.730°W
- Opened: 1900
- Operator: Halton Borough Council

Victoria Park is the premier urban park in Widnes, Cheshire, England. It is managed by Halton Borough Council.

== History ==
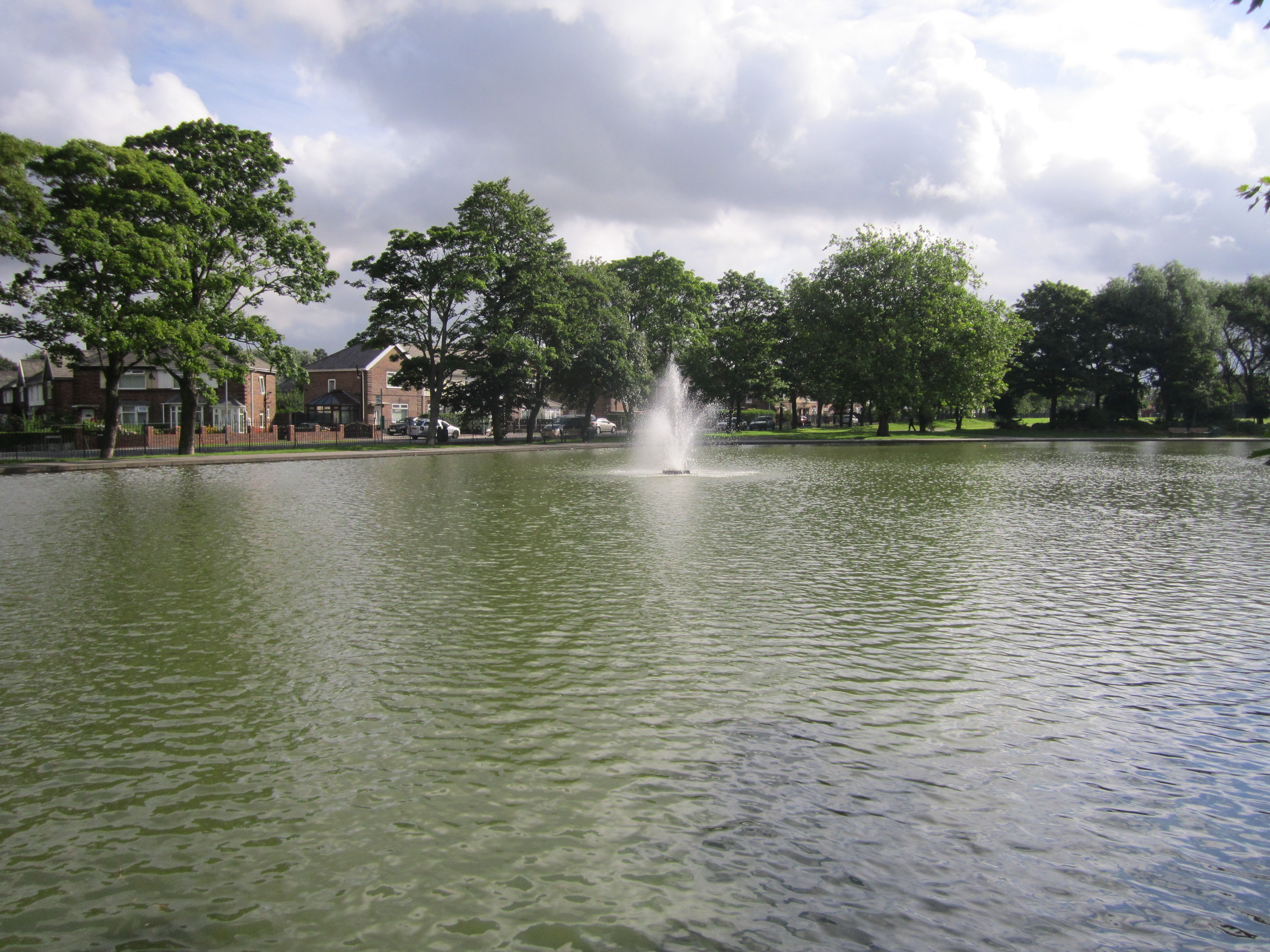
The lake with fountain

The park was opened in 1900 to celebrate the Diamond Jubilee of Queen Victoria. It is on the former Appleton House estate and was created by the local council with funds collected via a public subscription.

== Facilities ==
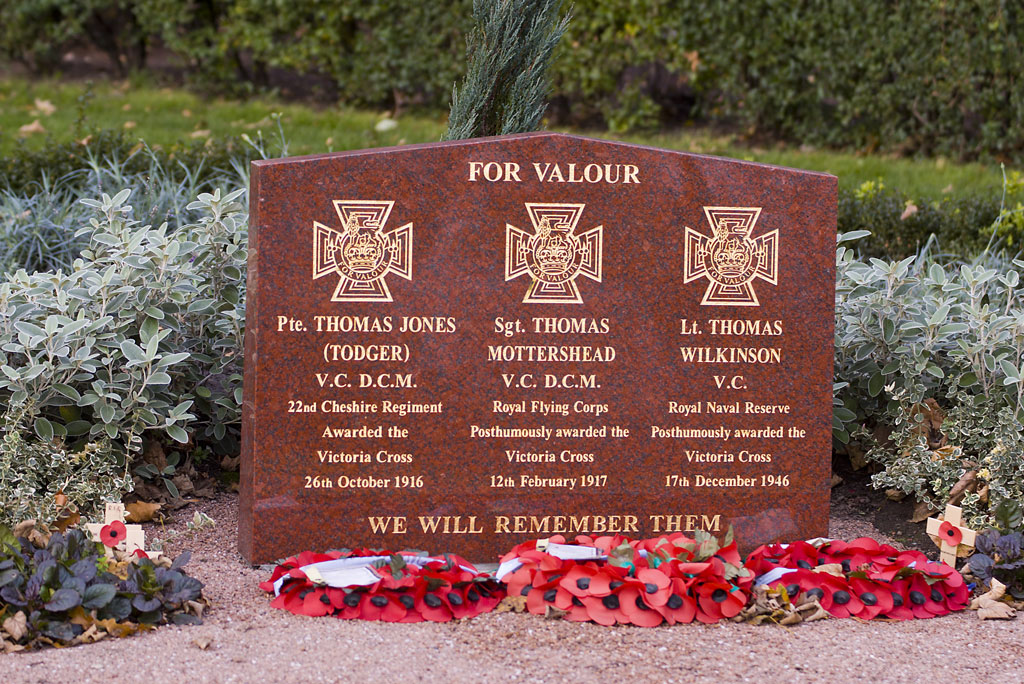
Memorial gravestones

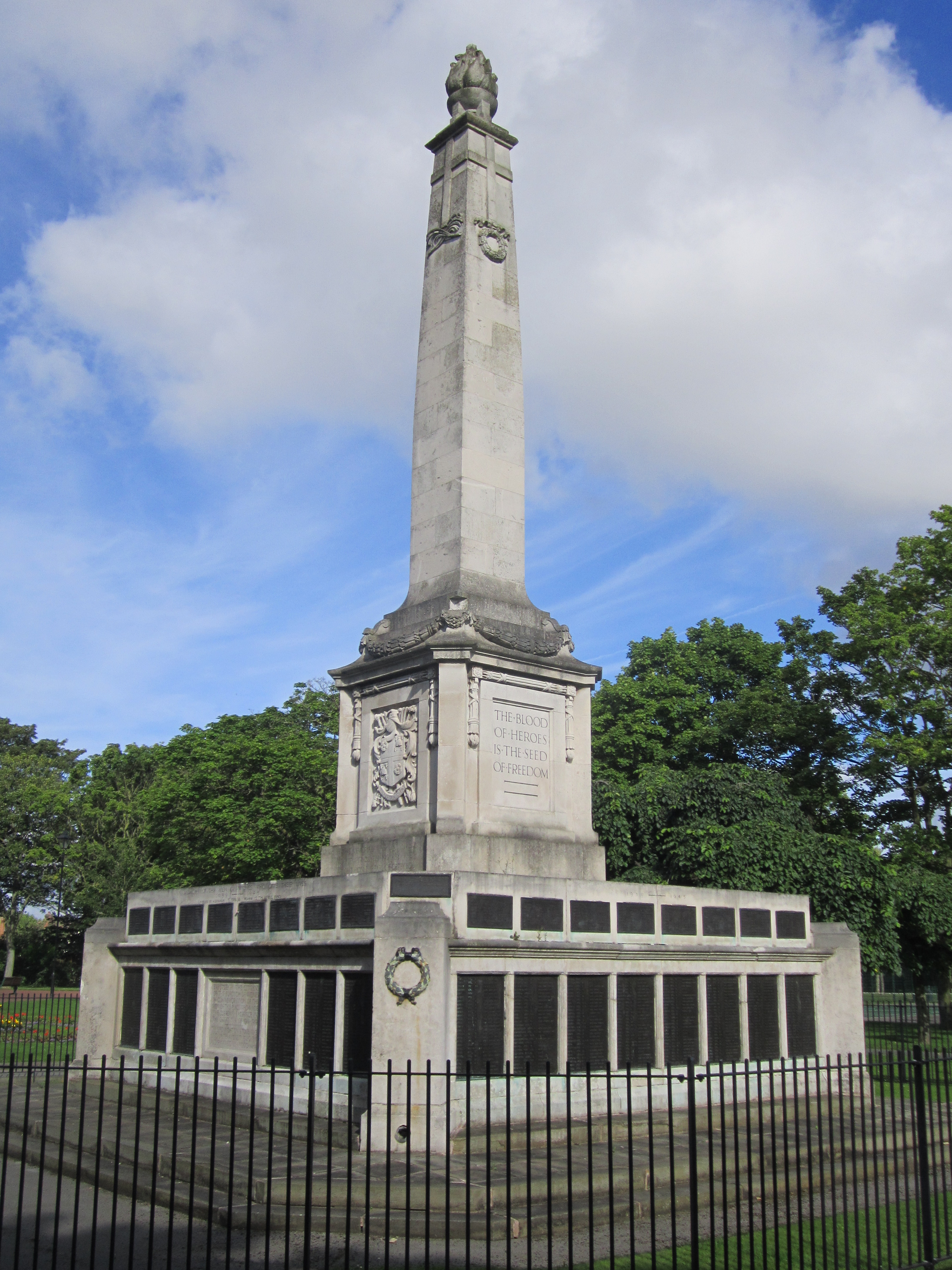
The War Memorial Pillar

There are paved walking routes, grass open spaces, formal gardens, a lake with a fountain, a café with toilets, ice cream parlour, children's play area, tennis courts, bowling greens, a skate park, climbing boulder, bandstand, basketball courts, an enclosed dog run and a butterfly house.

== Landmarks ==
The park contains a Grade II listed war memorial pillar. Incorporating detailed carvings and standing more than 16m high, the memorial is a striking and prominent architectural building. The pillar was designed by Harold E Davies and unveiled by the 17th Earl of Derby in a ceremony on 28 September 1921 after a civic parade from Widnes Town Hall. The memorial cost £6,000 and was paid for by public subscription. The sculptural additions were undertaken by the national artist Herbert Tyson Smith.

There is a memorial fountain in honour of William Ewart Gladstone. A milestone marker with plaque commemorates the last effective Zeppelin air raid of World War I in England. Five Zeppelins dropped bombs in Widnes, Ince and Wigan. There is a statue of Sgt. Thomas Mottershead V.C., DCM (1892–1917) who was born in Widnes and was awarded a Victoria Cross and Distinguished Conduct Medal in World War I. There is a combined memorial headstone for Mottershead and two other recipients of the V.C. from Halton: Thomas Wilkinson and Thomas Alfred Jones.

== Events ==
=== Parkrun ===
A 5km parkrun takes place every Saturday and Sunday morning beginning at 9am.

== See also ==
- List of parks and open spaces in Cheshire
