= Northwich Woodlands =

Woodlands in Cheshire, England

Coordinates: 53.264°N 2.555°W

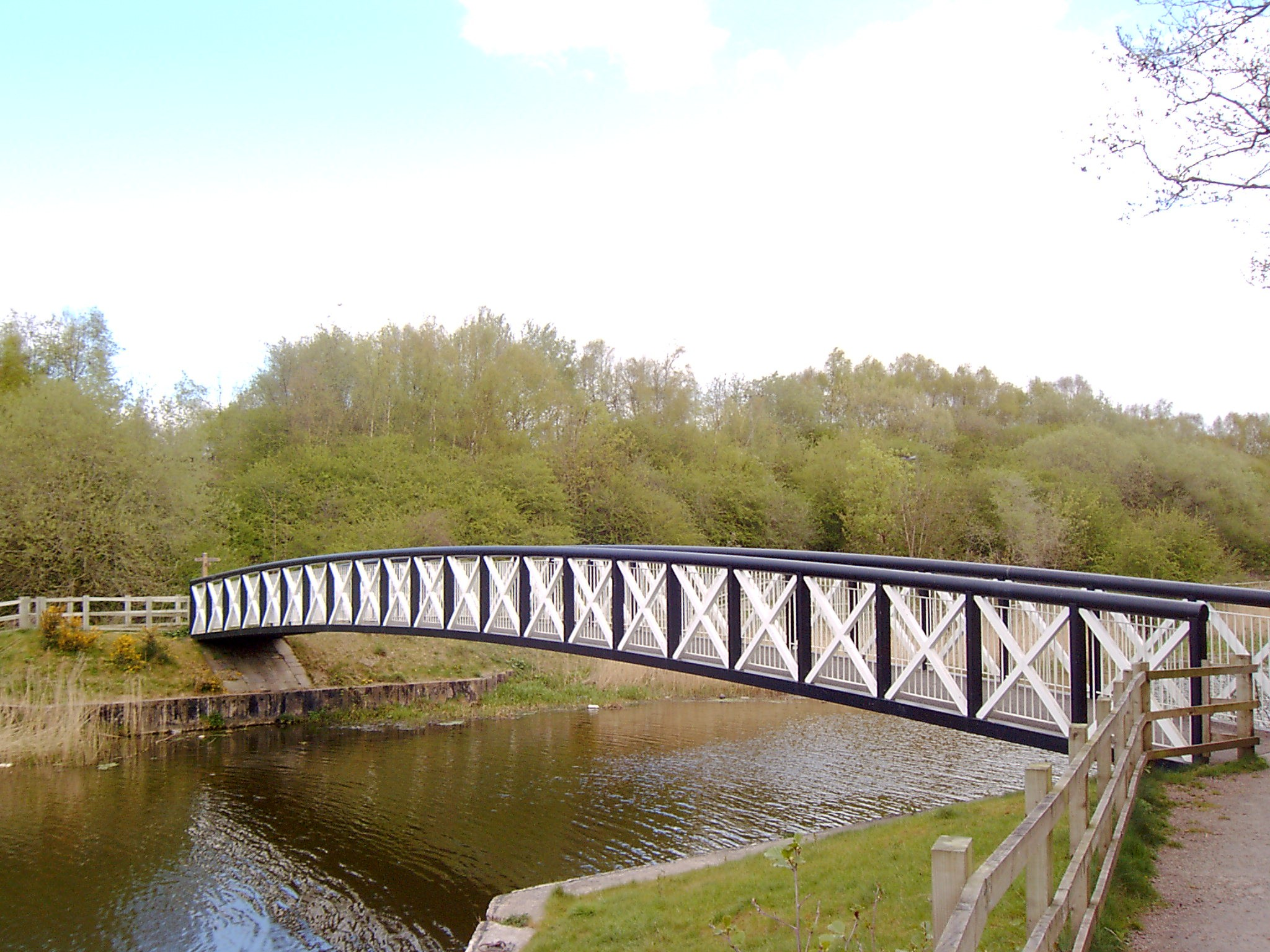
Carden's Ferry Bridge over Witton Brook, connecting Anderton Nature Park to Carey Park.

Northwich Woodlands (formerly Northwich Community Woodlands) is an area of 373 hectares of publicly accessible countryside near Northwich in Cheshire, England. It comprises nine separate woods, country parks, lakes and parks, many of which are connected to each other via footpaths and other rights of way. Much of the land was formerly industrial and used for mining salt and manufacturing chemicals. The extraction of salt caused subsidence leading to the formation of pools known as flashes. The land became derelict during the 20th century as the salt industry contracted. Much of the area has now been reclaimed for the purposes of conservation and recreation and forms part of the Mersey Forest initiative.

== Description ==
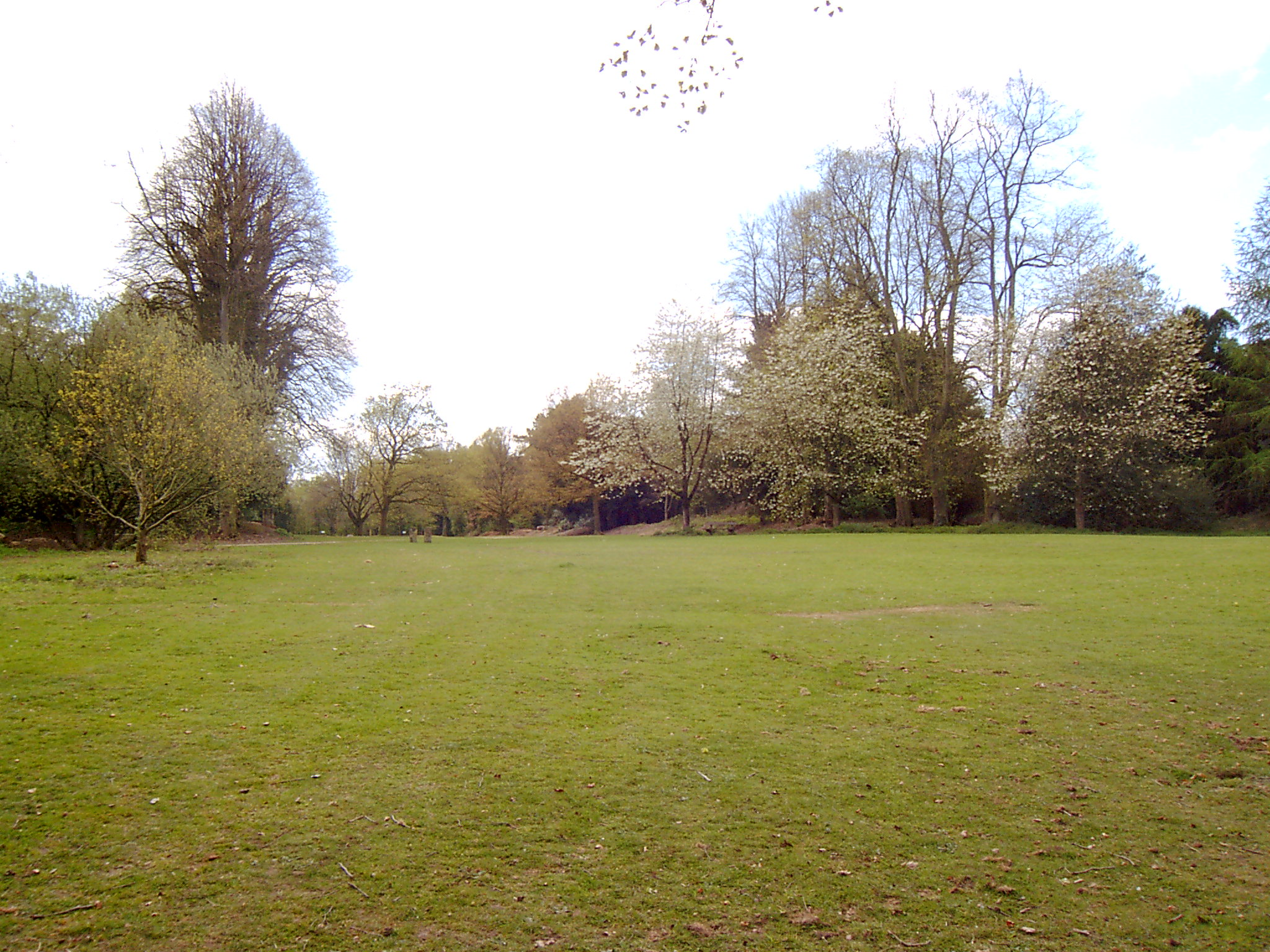
Marbury Country Park

Northwich Woodlands is made up of nine different sites: Marbury Country Park; Anderton Nature Park; Dairy House Meadows; Forge Woods; Hopyards Woods; Marshall's Woods; Ashton's Flash; Furey Woods and Carey Park.

=== Marbury Country Park ===
In the north of the area beside Budworth Mere is Marbury Country Park. It was formerly a country estate owned by the Smith-Barry family but it became derelict and Marbury Hall was demolished in 1968. The site was reclaimed in 1975 and is now run as a country park by Cheshire West and Chester Council. An arboretum, ice-house and avenues of lime trees remain from former times. An area of ancient woodland known as Big Wood is important for wildlife with a variety of woodland birds including lesser spotted woodpecker.

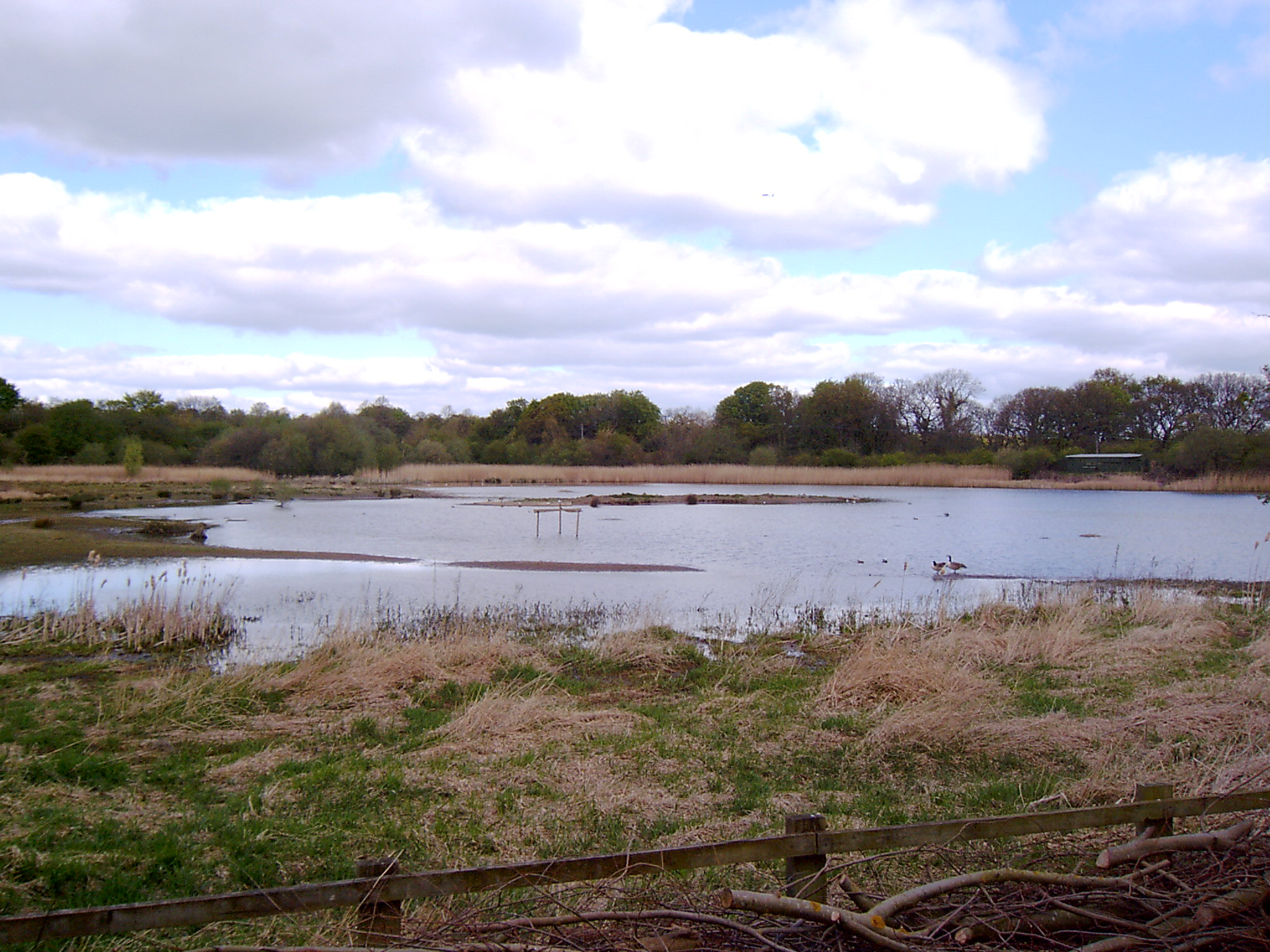
Haydn's Pool in Anderton Nature Park

=== Anderton Nature Park ===
Anderton Nature Park stretches along the north side of the River Weaver and Witton Brook from Anderton Boat Lift in the west to Haydn's Pool (formerly Marbury No. 1 Sludge Bed) in the east. A number of paths lead through grassland and recently planted woodland. Wildlife includes uncommon flowers such as pennyroyal. Haydn's Pool is important for waterbirds including regular green sandpiper.

=== Neumann's and Ashton's Flashes ===
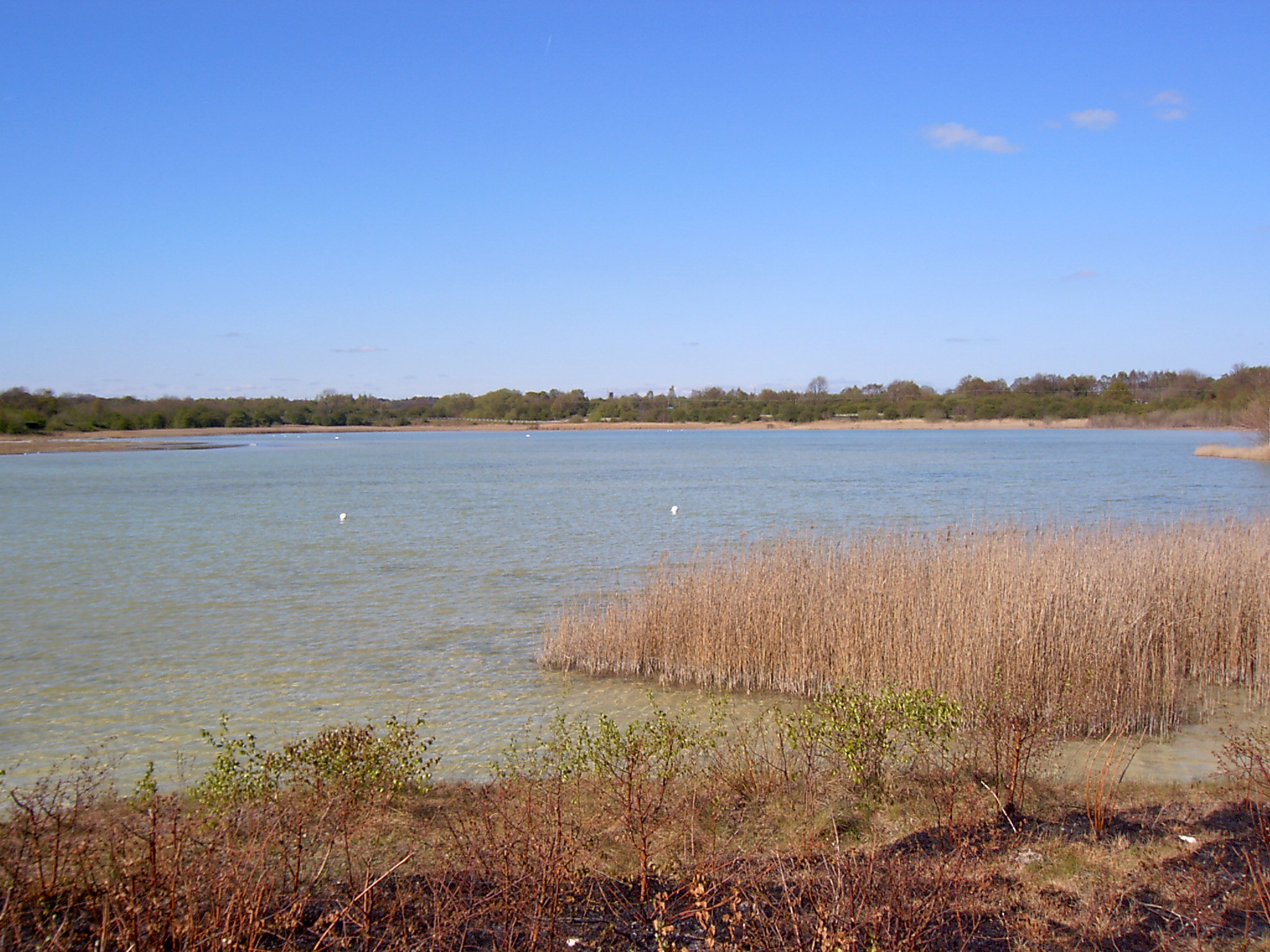
Neumann's Flash

These flashes lie at the south-east of the site. From the 1940s they were used by ICI to store lime waste but by the 1970s they had become disused. Paths and bird hides have now been constructed around them.

A number of plants associated with alkaline soils grow on the site including fragrant orchid, marsh helleborine, ploughman's spikenard, and yellow-wort. It is a stronghold for the dingy skipper butterfly. A variety of ducks, waders, and other waterbirds occur and numerous rarities have been recorded such as broad-billed sandpiper, stilt sandpiper, Caspian tern, and whiskered tern.

=== Witton Lime Beds SSSI ===
Immediately to the west of Neumann's and Ashton's Flashes, in a loop of Witton Brook, lies Witton Lime Beds, a Site of Special Scientific Interest.

=== Carey Park ===
Carey Park is the closest park to the town. It was opened in 2003 and named after Councillor Ron Carey who was instrumental in regenerating the site, the park is located on the site of the former Witton landfill. A conversion project took seven years. Carey Park is a Site of Special Scientific Interest with rare grasses and butterflies alongside other wildlife. Northwich Parkrun takes place in the park.

== See also ==
- List of parks and open spaces in Cheshire
