= West Heath, Cheshire =

Coordinates: 53°9′40″N 2°14′0″W

West Heath is a suburb to the west of Congleton, in Cheshire, England. It is the site of Astbury Mere Country Park. The West Heath area has three schools, with one of Congleton's two secondary schools, Congleton High School being located there.

== Geography and environment ==
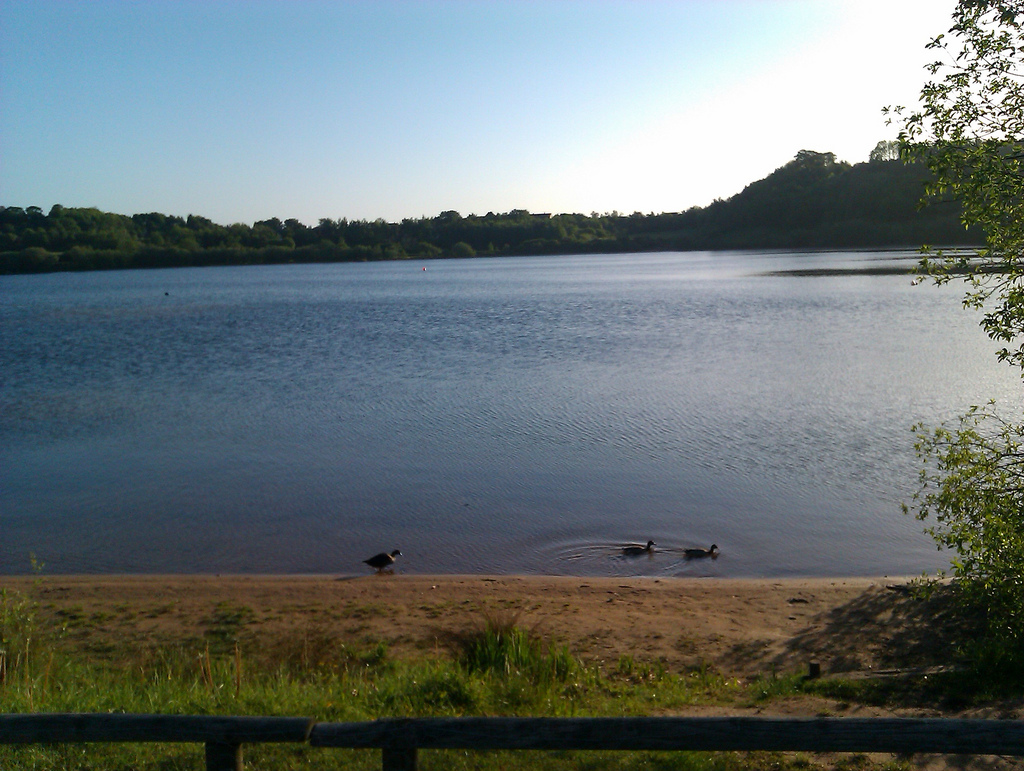
Astbury Mere

Congleton lies at a zone of transition between the Cheshire Plain and the Peak District. West Heath lies on the Cheshire Plain and consists of rolling farmland, suburbs and small woodlands. The flora of the area is typical of the Cheshire Plain, but is well wooded and with small areas of heathlands still surviving in isolated pockets, mainly around Astbury Mere and out towards Somerford.

== History ==
West Heath was formerly an area of large heathland and woodland. It had an opencast sand quarry, now a lake known as Astbury Mere. Many of the houses and layout were built after the 1960s to the present, although older buildings pocket the area.

== Astbury Mere ==
Astbury Mere is a local country park and is popular with walkers, dog walkers, cyclists, fishermen and adventure sports enthusiasts.
