= Phoenix Park, Runcorn =

Park in Runcorn, Cheshire, England

Phoenix Park
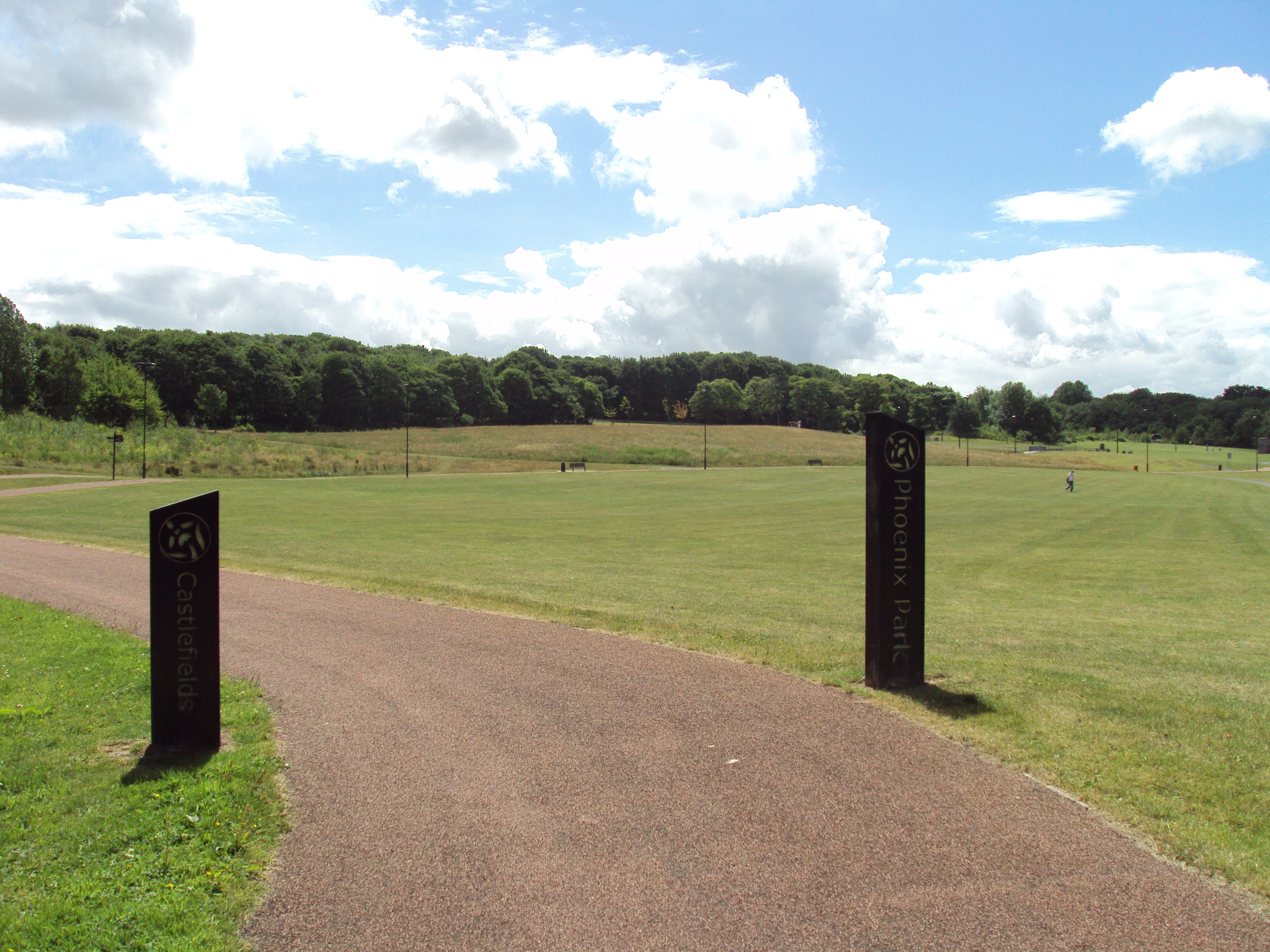
- Interactive map of Phoenix Park
- Type: Urban park
- Location: Runcorn, Cheshire, England
- Coordinates: 53.3356°N 2.6828°W
- Operator: Halton Borough Council
- Open: All year
- Awards: Green Flag Award
- Website: visit.halton.me/project/phoenix-park/

Phoenix Park is a park in Runcorn, Cheshire, England.

== History ==
Phoenix Park is part of the Mersey Forest, with a range of wildlife. The park is adjacent to Norton Priory which formerly had a separate space called the Norton Priory Recreation Centre which was incorporated into the park circa 2004. In 2018 the children's play area was redeveloped.

== Facilities ==
There is a pavilion, walking routes along the Bridgewater Canal, woodland walks, a lake, picnic benches, a children's playground with slides, climbing frames, seesaws and swings. There is a climbing boulder, skatepark, a multi-use sports area, football and basketball. Footpaths lead to Norton Priory a 12th Century Abbey and garden that is Grade I listed with Historic England. Runcorn Parkrun takes place in the park every Saturday morning, the course loops the park before heading along the canal and lake. Fishing is allowed on the lake for members of a club. The park holds a Green Flag Award.

== See also ==
- List of parks and open spaces in Cheshire
