= Paddington Meadows =

Nature reserve in Cheshire, England

Coordinates: 53.389°N 2.557°W

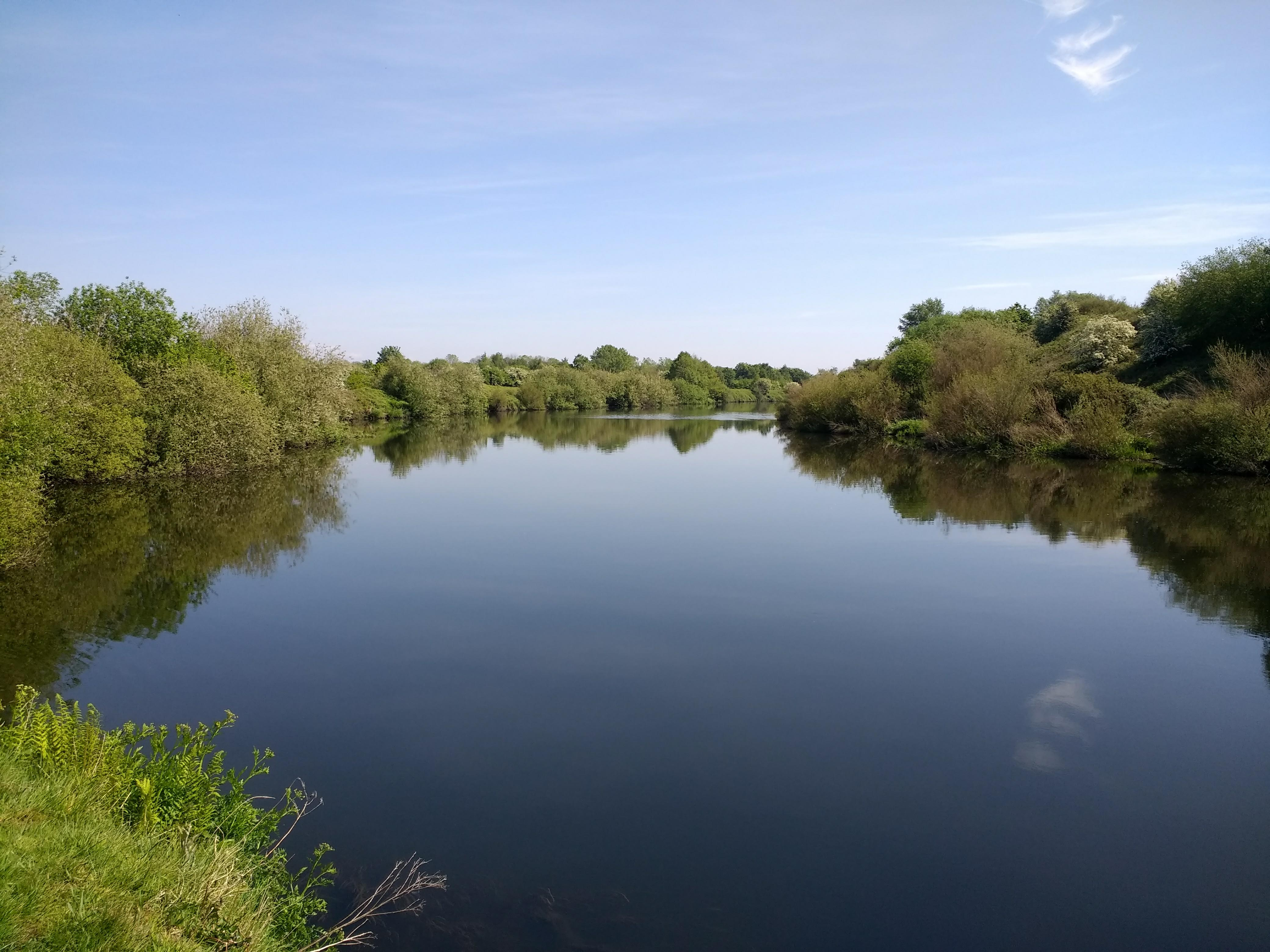
The River Mersey at Paddington Meadows

Paddington Meadows is a Local Nature Reserve in Warrington, Cheshire. The land was donated to Warrington Borough council in 1995. It was designated in November 2005.

The site comprises almost 30 hectares of meadow grassland occupying the area to the south of Manchester Road (the A57) and to the north of the Mersey. It is five minutes by car from Warrington town centre. There is ongoing active management of the hedgerows which include thinning and laying of the various edges. Hawthorns also grow in an orchard area rather than the more useful hedge arrangement. There are various paths around the perimeter and crossing the meadows that are open and closed at various times dependent on conservation projects.

On occasion the members of the Warrington rowing club can be seen using the Mersey.

Rare breed longhorn cattle are grazed on the site during the summer months and they play a vital role in keeping the grass short, which in turn encourages ground nesting birds such as skylark. A wild flower meadow has been created on one of the fields.

The site attracts flocks of fieldfares and redwings, which feed on the berries of some of the oldest hawthorn hedges in the Cheshire area.

A major project was started in 2009 to clean up the Woolston new cut canal that runs along the northern edge of the meadows. Invasive flora is being cut back and long-term projects are attempting to remove pollution and toxicants from the silt in the canal.
