= Cheshire Midland Railway =

Railway in Cheshire, England

Overview
- Locale: Cheshire
- Dates of operation: 1860; 166 years ago–1867; 159 years ago
- Successor: Cheshire Lines Committee

Technical
- Track gauge: 4 ft 8 1/2 in (1,435 mm) standard gauge
- Length: 12 miles 65 chains (20.6 km)

The Cheshire Midland Railway was authorised by an act of Parliament, passed on 14 June 1860, to build a 12-mile-65-chain (20.6 km) railway from Altrincham on the Manchester, South Junction and Altrincham Railway to Northwich.

== History ==
Cheshire Midland Railway Act 1860
- Act of Parliament
- Parliament of the United Kingdom
- Long title: An Act for making a Railway from Altrincham through Knutsford to Northwich in the County of Chester, and for other Purposes.
- Citation: 23 & 24 Vict. c. xc

Dates
- Royal assent: 14 June 1860

Cheshire Midland Railway Act 1861
- Act of Parliament
- Parliament of the United Kingdom
- Long title: An Act for authorizing the Cheshire Midland Railway Company to make a Deviation of their authorized Line of Railway; and for authorizing Working and other Arrangements between them and the Manchester, Sheffield, and Lincolnshire Railway Company; and for other Purposes.
- Citation: 24 & 25 Vict. c. cxiii

Dates
- Royal assent: 11 July 1861

The Cheshire Midland Railway Act 1860 (23 & 24 Vict. c. xc) was promoted by landowners and supported by the Manchester, Sheffield and Lincolnshire Railway (MS&LR). The London and North Western Railway were given leave to subscribe to the undertaking but they chose not to and the MS&LR found help from Great Northern Railway (GNR) instead.

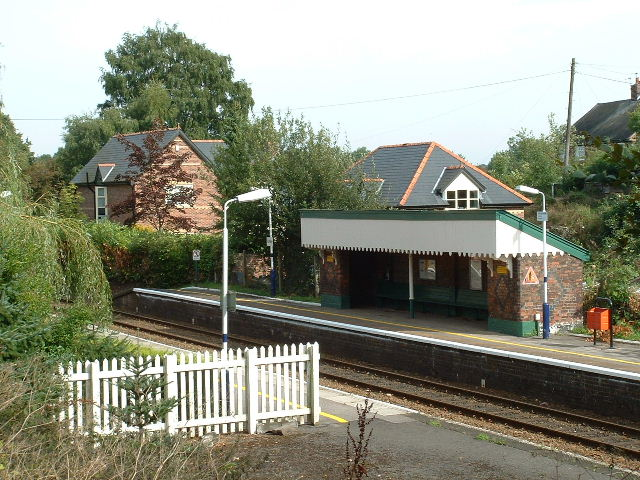
Ashley Railway Station

A further act, the Cheshire Midland Railway Act 1861 (24 & 25 Vict. c. cxiii), modified the route and provided for the official involvement of the MS&LR.

Together the MS&LR and GNR formed a joint committee to operate this railway along with three others that had been authorised but were not yet open. (Note: They were the Stockport and Woodley Junction Railway, the Stockport, Timperley and Altrincham Junction Railway and the West Cheshire Railway) Together these railways connected up to provide an alternative route into North Cheshire that avoided Manchester.

Each company was to provide an equal amount of capital and four representatives to the joint management committee. This arrangement was confirmed by the Great Northern Railway (Cheshire Lines) Act 1863 (26 & 27 Vict. c. cxlvii). This act had not, however, formally set up a separate legal body, providing instead for the two companies to manage and work the four railways through their existing structures.

This arrangement eventually led to the formation of the Cheshire Lines Committee in 1865. The line was then formally brought under the direct joint ownership of the MS&LR and GNR in 1865 by the Cheshire Lines Transfer Act 1865 (28 & 29 Vict. c. cccxxvii). The act allowed the Midland Railway to join as an equal partner, which it did in 1866. and finally The Cheshire Lines Committee was authorised by the Cheshire Lines Act 1867 (30 & 31 Vict. c. ccvii) as a fully independent organisation with a board formed from three directors from each of the parent companies.

Today the railway forms part of the Mid-Cheshire Line.

== Opening ==
The Cheshire Midland Railway opened in stages:

- Knutsford to Mobberley opened for passenger traffic on 12 May 1862 and for goods traffic on 1 May 1863.
- Northwich to Knutsford opened for passenger traffic on 1 January 1863 and for goods traffic on 1 May 1863.

A mineral railway ran to the north between Lostock and Northwich, this line, usually known as the Marston branch, provided access to a number of works, mostly connected to salt mining and extraction. They opened for freight only from 17 December 1867 onwards.

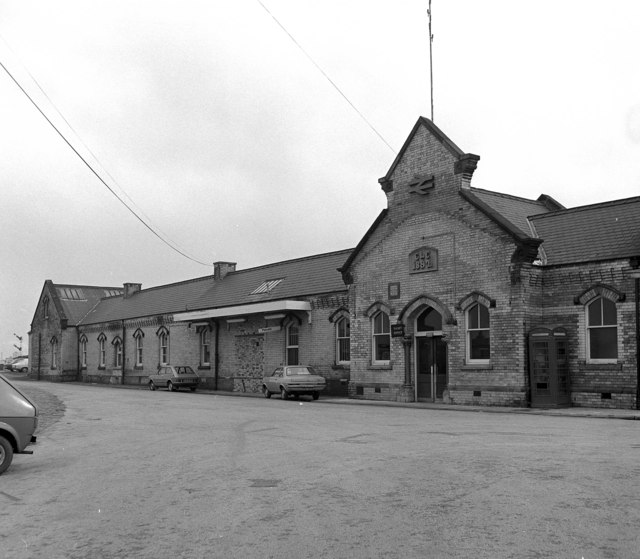
Northwich station

== Route and stations ==
The railway started from an end-on connection with the Manchester, South Junction and Altrincham Railway (MSJ&AR) at Altrincham Junction, just south of Bowdon station on the MSJ&AR. Initial intermediate stations were at:

- Bowdon Peel Causeway, renamed Peel Causeway on 1 January 1899 and renamed Hale on 1 January 1902.
- Ashley, described as Ashley for Rostherne in some timetables.
- Mobberley.
- Knutsford, original station opened at end of the first stage of construction when the line reached Knutsford. The first station closed and was replaced by a second station when the line was extended to Northwich on 1 January 1863.
- Plumbley, renamed Plumley on 1 February 1945.
- Lostock, renamed Lostock Gralam sometime later in 1863.
- Northwich, original station opened with the line on 1 January 1863, it closed on 1 September 1869 and became the goods station from this time. A second station was opened nearby when the line was extended by the building of the West Cheshire Railway's line onwards to Hartford and Greenbank opening on 1 September 1869. The first part, 4 chains (80 m), of this route to Northwich Junction was opened earlier than this to allow London and North Western Railway (LNWR) services to Sandbach access to both stations.

The line terminated at Northwich Junction where the LNWR line headed south towards Sandbach and the West Cheshire line continued westward.

A further station, Plumbley West Platform, is known to have been open for passengers only from sometime in 1915. It was closed by September 1926. The station was sited 65 chains (1,300 m) west of Plumbley.

== Public house ==
The former 'Cheshire Midland' public house by Hale railway station on Ashley Road, Hale was named after the railway.

== See also ==
- Salt in Cheshire
- History of Northwich
- Lion Salt Works
