= Hale railway station =

Railway station in Greater Manchester, England

Coordinates: 53°22′44″N 2°20′51″W

Hale
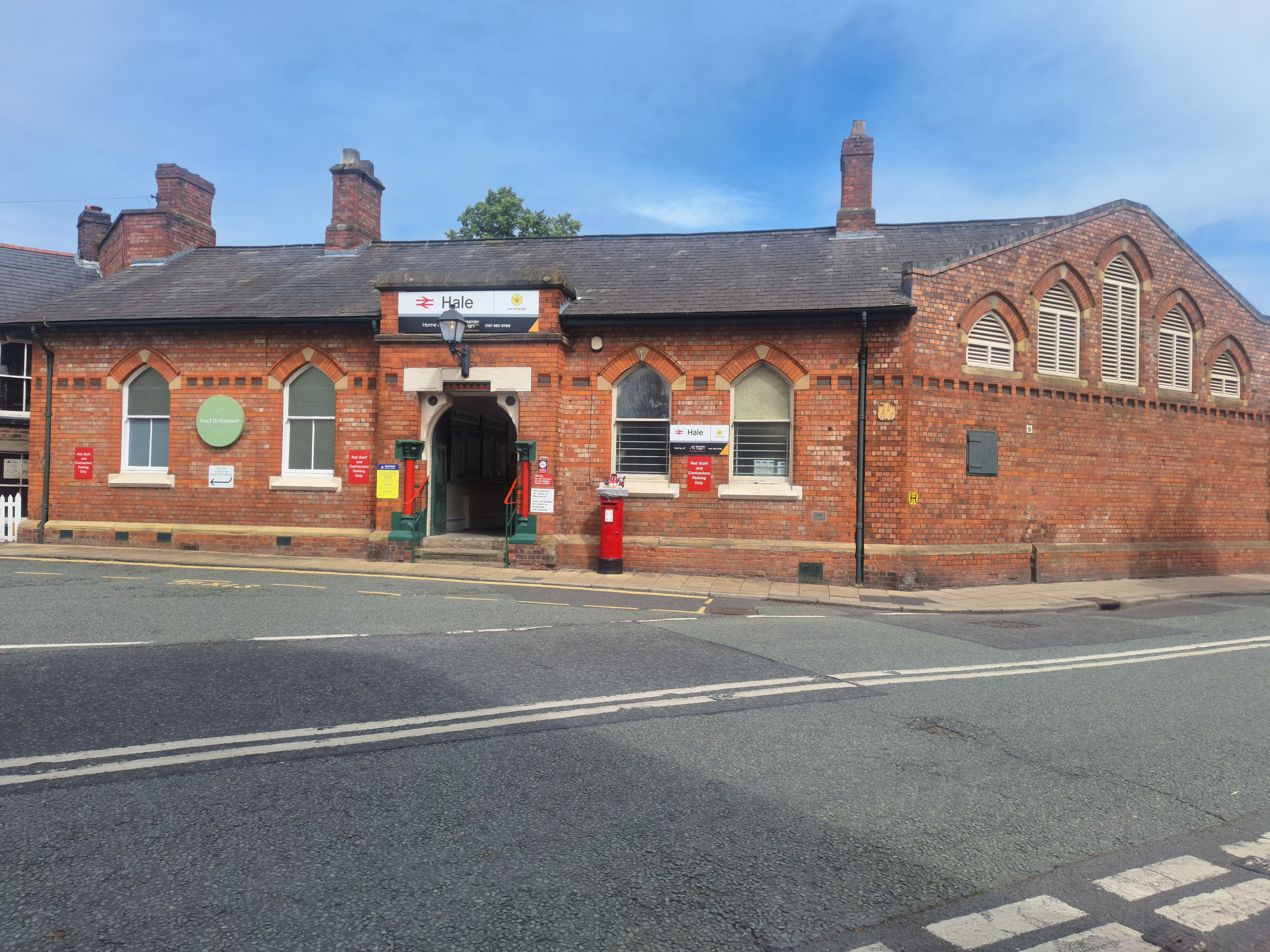
- The railway station in 2026

General information
- Location: Hale, Trafford, England
- Grid reference: SJ769869
- Manager: Northern Trains
- Transit authority: Greater Manchester
- Platforms: 2

Other information
- Station code: HAL
- Classification: DfT category E

History
- Opened: 1862

Passengers
- 2020/21: ▼29,880
- 2021/22: ▲85,142
- 2022/23: ▲95,054
- 2023/24: ▲0.114 million
- 2024/25: ▲0.131 million
Location
Notes
- Passenger statistics from the Office of Rail and Road

Hale railway station serves the area of Hale, south of Altrincham, in Greater Manchester, England; it is also used by people living in the surrounding areas of Bowdon and Hale Barns. It is a stop on the Mid-Cheshire line between Chester, Stockport and Manchester Piccadilly. The station is located on Ashley Road.

== History ==
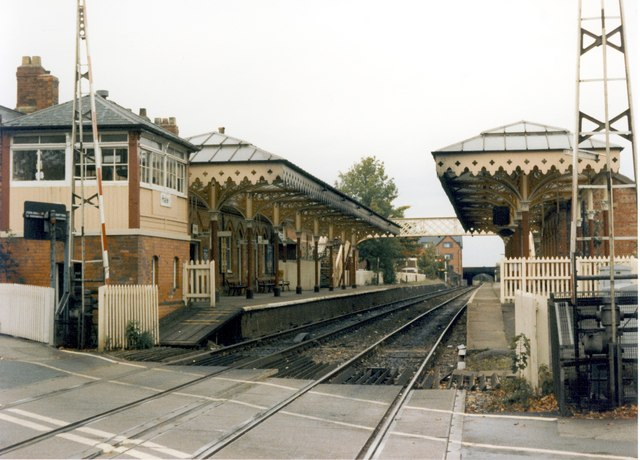
The railway station in 1988, looking north from the level crossing; the signal box is on the left

The station was opened as Peel Causeway by the Cheshire Midland Railway (CMR) on 12 May 1862, when the railway opened from Altrincham to Knutsford. The CMR was amalgamated into the Cheshire Lines Committee (CLC) on 15 August 1867. The station became Peel Causeway for Hale on 1 January 1899 and it was renamed Hale on 1 January 1902.

The station was served by passenger trains from Manchester Central to Northwich and Chester Northgate. The CLC remained an independent entity, as a joint London, Midland and Scottish Railway and London and North Eastern Railway operation after the Grouping of 1923, until the creation of British Railways (BR). The station then passed on to the London Midland Region of British Railways on nationalisation on 1 January 1948. When sectorisation was introduced in the 1980s, the station was managed by Regional Railways, under arrangement with the Greater Manchester PTE, until the privatisation of British Rail.

== Facilities ==
The station has a ticket office on platform 1, which is open on weekday mornings. A ticket vending machine is in place for purchase of tickets outside of these hours and for the collection of pre-paid tickets. Digital station information boards are in operation on both platforms, along with station announcements. Car parking is available on either side of the level crossing.

A veterinary surgery now occupies most of the station building on platform 1, while a physiotherapist practice uses the platform 2 building. The west platform building and signal box are Grade II listed; the latter is no longer in use.

== Services ==
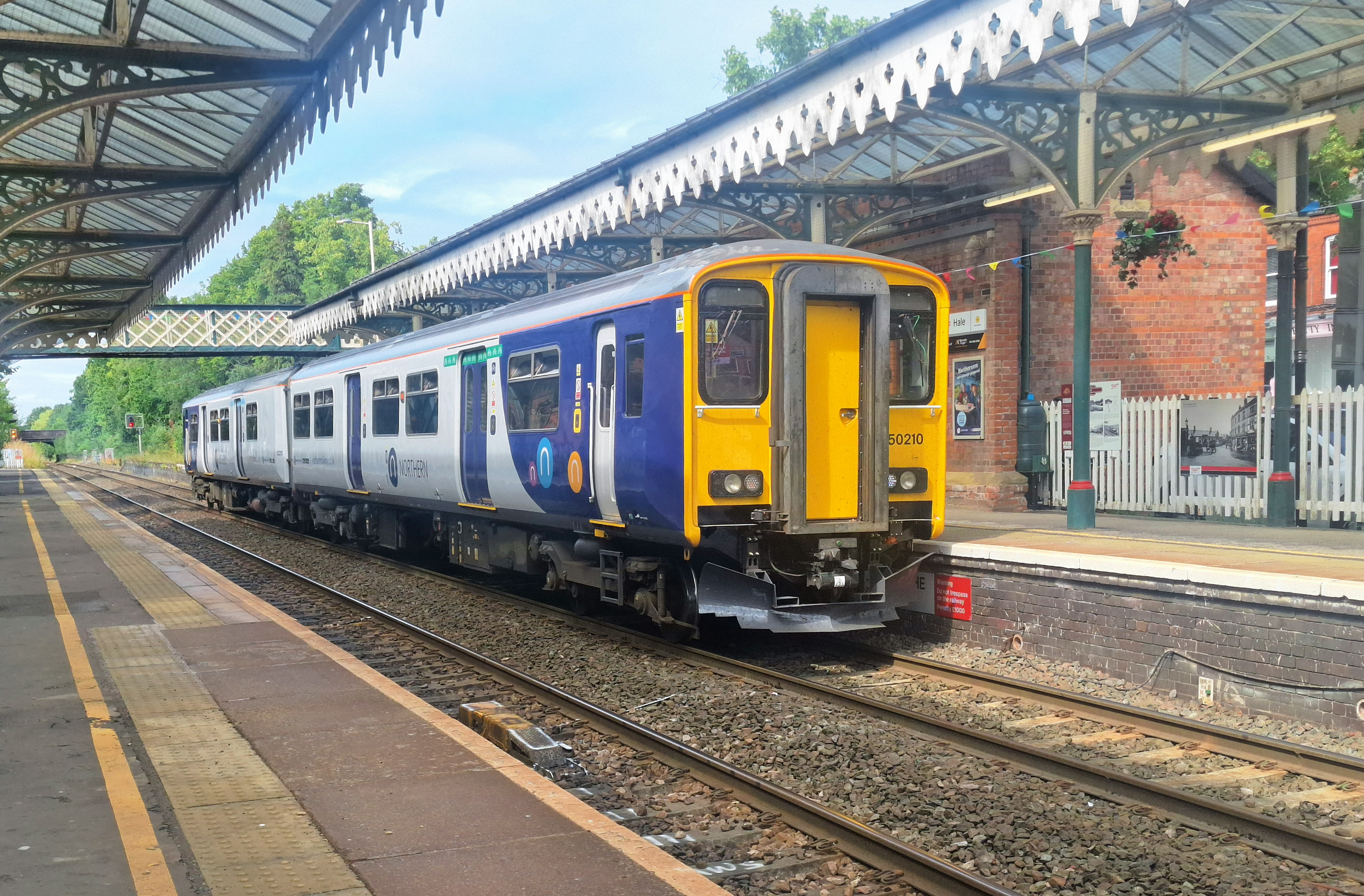
A Northern Trains diesel multiple unit at the railway station in 2026

Northern Trains operates a generally hourly service in each direction between Chester and Manchester Piccadilly on the Mid-Cheshire line, with two peak extras to/from Stockport. On Sundays, services are two-hourly in each direction.

Preceding station	National Rail	Following station
Altrincham	Northern Trains Mid-Cheshire line	Ashley
