= Greenbank railway station =

Railway station in Cheshire, England

Coordinates: 53°15′05″N 2°32′02″W

Greenbank
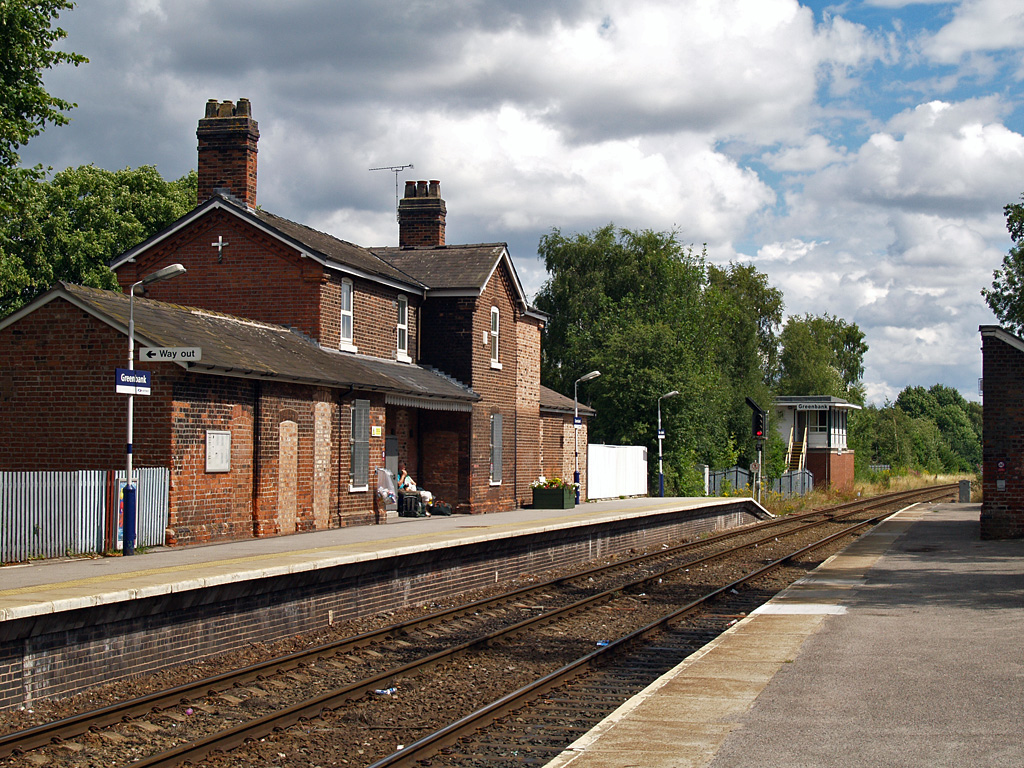

General information
- Location: Hartford, Cheshire West and Chester; England
- Grid reference: SJ644728
- Managed by: Northern Trains
- Platforms: 2

Other information
- Station code: GBK
- Classification: DfT category F1

History
- Original company: West Cheshire Railway
- Pre-grouping: Cheshire Lines Committee
- Post-grouping: Cheshire Lines Committee

Key dates
- 22 June 1870: Station opened as Hartford and Greenbank
- 7 May 1973: Name changed to Greenbank

Passengers
- 2020/21: ▼94,578
- 2021/22: ▲171,182
- 2022/23: ▲184,316
- 2023/24: ▲211,404
- 2024/25: ▲214,818
Location
Notes
- Passenger statistics from the Office of Rail and Road

Greenbank railway station serves the village of Hartford, as well as the Greenbank and Castle areas of Northwich, in Cheshire, England. The station is situated on the Mid-Cheshire line and the A559 road between Northwich and Chester.

== History ==
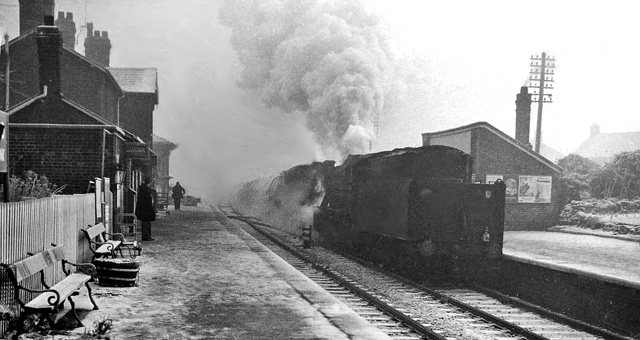
Winter scene at Hartford and Greenbank in 1962

The station was built by the West Cheshire Railway, a constituent of the Cheshire Lines Committee (CLC) and opened to passengers on 22 June 1870. The CLC continued to operate both goods and passenger services from the station, unaffected by the railway grouping of 1923, until the railway nationalisation of 1948. The station name was Hartford and Greenbank until 7 May 1973 when British Railways renamed the station Greenbank, to avoid confusion with the nearby Hartford station on the West Coast Main Line.

Greenbank was served by CLC trains from Manchester Central to Chester Northgate, via Northwich. From the closure of Manchester Central on 5 May 1969 and Chester Northgate on 6 October that year, trains from Greenbank were diverted to Manchester Oxford Road and Chester (the LNWR and GWR joint station, previously known as Chester General).

CLC trains were headed by locomotives in LNER livery. A link to LMS service was made by a shuttle service to Acton Bridge using LMS stock; this normally continued to Crewe, via Northwich, Middlewich and Sandbach. This service was nicknamed "The Dodger", but was withdrawn in 1942.

As of the December 2008 timetable, there were two additional weekday peak services to and from Stockport. On Sundays, a two-hourly service to Chester and Manchester Piccadilly introduced, with the latter continuing to Southport, via Wigan Wallgate and Bolton. Prior to the new service, trains to Manchester had not operated on Sundays since the early 1990s. Passengers had to change at Altrincham on to the Manchester Metrolink to continue their journeys.

Services beyond Manchester were terminated in the May 2010 timetable change, with all current trains now calling at Manchester Piccadilly and no further. Additional weekday peak services to/from Stockport were suspended in 2020.

== Facilities ==
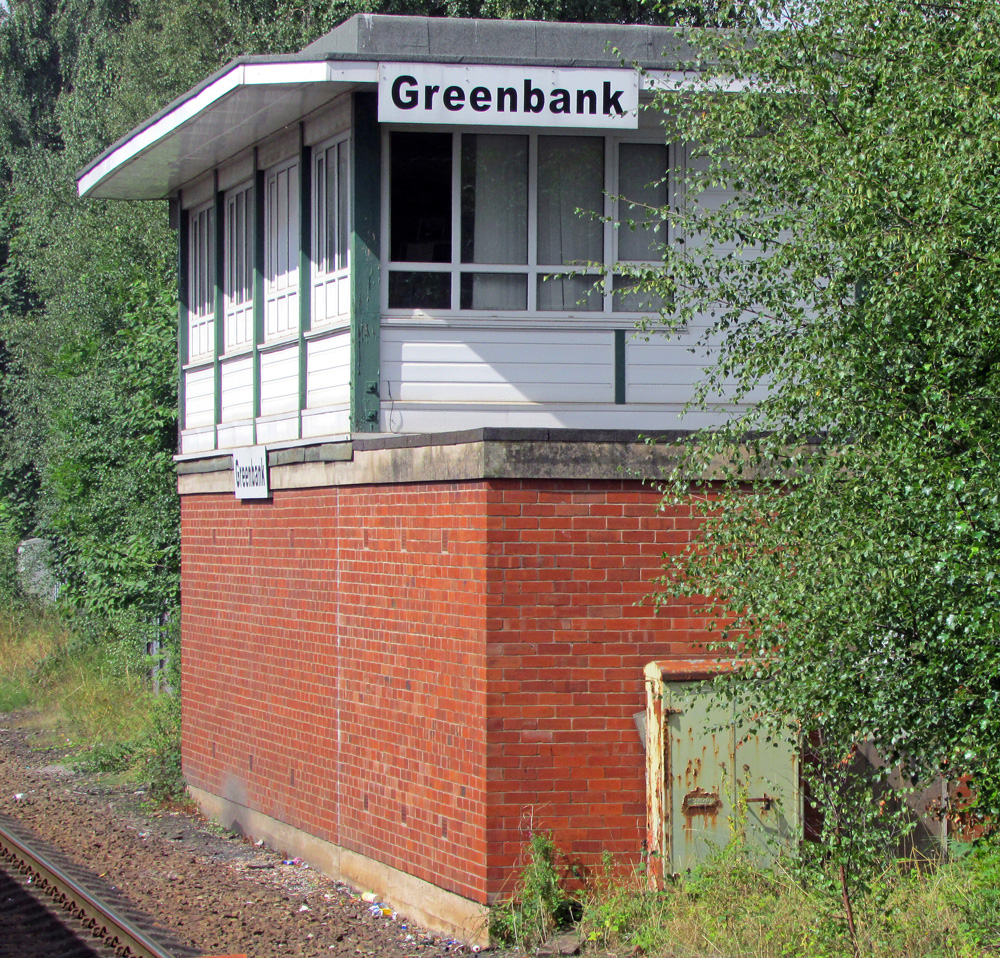
Greenbank signal box

The station is unstaffed, although there is a self-service ticket machine provided. It has a free car park, with a public phone box opposite the station and a row of shops nearby; The Greenbank public house is next to the station. The main station buildings are on the north-west side of the line and are presently used as a Christian church. Waiting shelters are provided on each side and train running details are offered via digital CIS displays, telephone and timetable posters. Step-free access is provided to both platforms.

The signal box is situated to the north of the station, which controls the line from Cuddington through to Plumley, the various branches and siding connections from it; these include the line to Sandbach and the now-disused link into the defunct Brunner-Mond chemical works at Winnington.

== Service ==
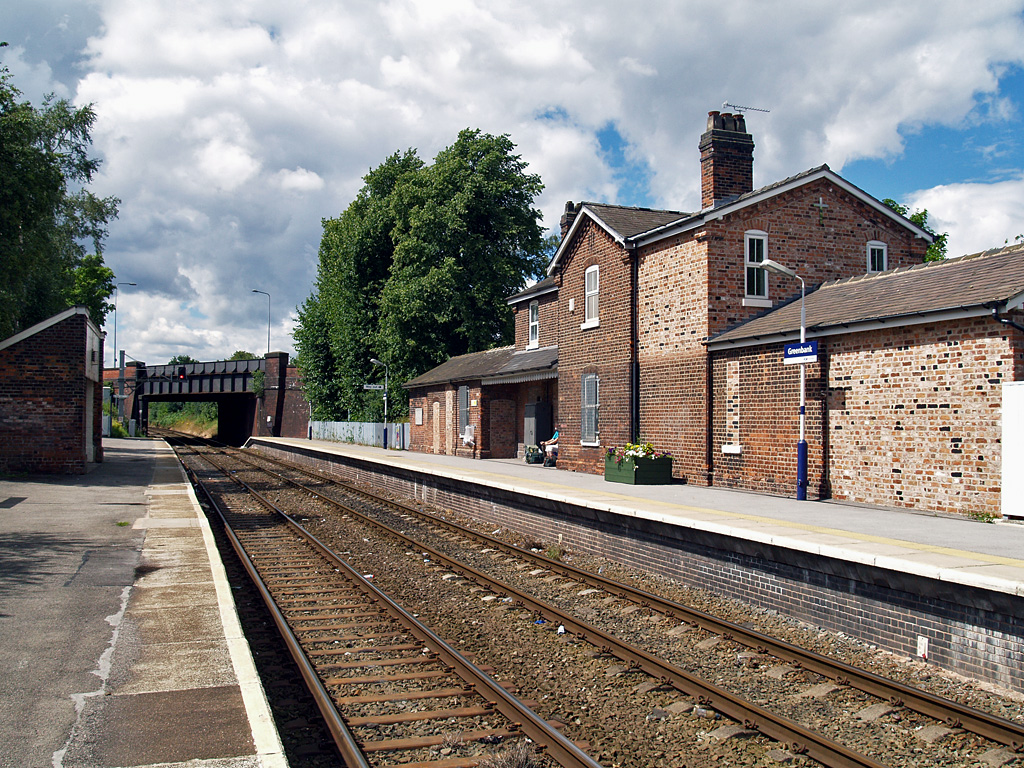
A view towards Chester in 2008

Northern Trains operates an hourly service along the Mid-Cheshire line between Chester, Stockport and Manchester Piccadilly. On weekdays, there are 18 trains per day run to Chester, with 17 running towards Manchester. On Sundays, there is a two-hourly service each way, with 7 trains in each direction.

Preceding station	National Rail	Following station
Cuddington	Northern Trains; Mid-Cheshire Line	Northwich

== Proposed future developments ==
There have been repeated plans for a half-hourly service in each direction; it was a part of the 2015 franchise agreement but these has been delayed due to capacity constraints between Stockport and Manchester.

As part of Northern's proposed December 2022 timetable, which focuses on additional services within the Manchester area, an additional four trains per day between Chester and Stockport (two in each direction) have been proposed during peak hours on Mondays to Saturdays. These services are aimed at those who are commuting to and/or working in Manchester and Stockport. This change will increase the number of trains departing Chester on the line to 20 per day, with the number departing Stockport also increased to 20 per day. The two-hourly Sunday service will remain the same, at 7 trains per day.
