= Ashley railway station =

Railway station in Cheshire, England

Coordinates: 53.356°N 2.341°W

Ashley
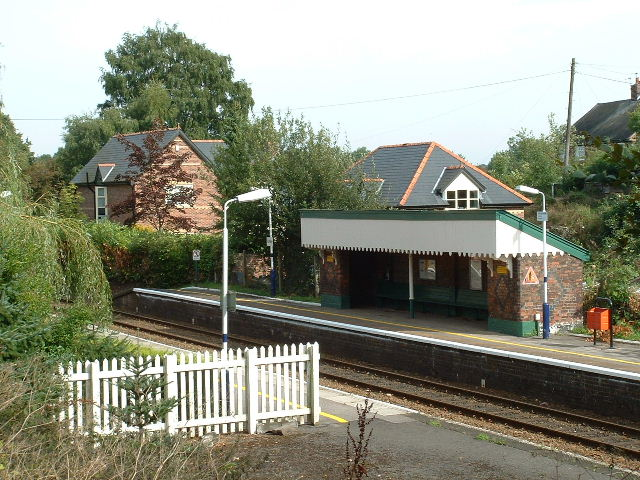
- Ashley railway station in 2005

General information
- Location: Ashley, Cheshire East; England
- Grid reference: SJ773843
- Manager: Northern Trains
- Platforms: 2

Other information
- Station code: ASY
- Classification: DfT category F2

History
- Opened: 12 May 1862

Passengers
- 2021/22: ▲6,666
- 2022/23: ▲7,902
- 2023/24: ▲8,248
- 2024/25: ▲8,648
- 2025/26: ▼8,244
Location
Notes
- Passenger statistics from the Office of Rail and Road

Ashley railway station serves the village and civil parish of Ashley in Cheshire, England. It is located on the Mid-Cheshire line, 17 3/4 miles (28.6 km) south-west of Manchester Piccadilly.

== History ==
The station was opened by the Cheshire Midland Railway (CMR) on 12 May 1862, when the railway opened from Altrincham to Knutsford. The CMR was amalgamated into the Cheshire Lines Committee (CLC) on 15 August 1867.

The station was served by passenger trains from Manchester Central to Northwich and Chester Northgate. The CLC remained an independent entity, as a joint London, Midland and Scottish Railway and London and North Eastern Railway operation after the Grouping of 1923, until the creation of British Railways (BR). The station then passed on to the London Midland Region of British Railways on nationalisation on 1 January 1948.

When sectorisation was introduced in the 1980s, the station was served by Regional Railways under arrangement with the Greater Manchester Passenger Transport Executive (GMPTE), until the privatisation of British Rail.

The station retains many of its original features and buildings, although these have been converted for residential use.

== Facilities ==
The station is unstaffed and was, until 12 December 2010, a request stop only. Amenities here are very basic, with just a single waiting shelter on platform 2 and bench seating, timetable posters and a public telephone. A ticket vending machine is in place for the purchase of tickets and for the collection of pre-paid tickets. Step-free access is available to both platforms.

== Service ==
There is an hourly service, with more at peak times, on weekdays and Saturdays running to Manchester via Stockport and in the opposite direction to Chester. Trains call every two hours on Sundays.

Preceding station	National Rail	Following station
Mobberley	Northern Trains; Mid-Cheshire line	Hale
