= Helsby and Alvanley railway station =

Disused railway station in England

Helsby and Alvanley

General information
- Location: Helsby, Cheshire West and Chester; England
- Coordinates: 53.2669°N 2.7716°W
- Grid reference: SJ485747
- Platforms: 1

Other information
- Status: Disused

History
- Original company: West Cheshire Railway
- Pre-grouping: Cheshire Lines Committee
- Post-grouping: Cheshire Lines Committee; London Midland Region of British Railways

Key dates
- 1 September 1869: Opened for goods
- 22 June 1870: Opened for passengers
- 1 May 1875: Closed to passengers
- October 1936: Reopened for passengers
- 22 May 1944: Closed for passengers
- 9 September 1963: Reopened for passengers
- 6 January 1964: Closed for passengers
- 2 March 1964: Closed for goods (except for a private siding)
- 14 September 1991: Line closed
Location

Helsby and Alvanley railway station was one of two railway stations serving the village of Helsby in Cheshire. The station was the terminus of the Helsby branch operated by the Cheshire Lines Committee and later British Railways. It has since been closed. The other station, Helsby railway station, remains open.

== Location ==
The station was located on the eastern side of Chester Road (the A56), in Helsby, Cheshire, England. Alvanley was a village located to the south of Helsby and the station was situated on that side of the town, that, and the fact that the other station, belonging to the Birkenhead Railway (formerly the Birkenhead, Lancashire and Cheshire Junction Railway) had opened in 1852 and already taken the name Helsby, led to the station being called Helsby and Alvanley.

== History ==
The station was planned and authorised by Parliament in 1861 and 1862 as part of the West Cheshire Railway (WCR). Helsby was the terminal station although the prime reason for the lines construction was to provide a freight link to Birkenhead docks via the Birkenhead Railway.

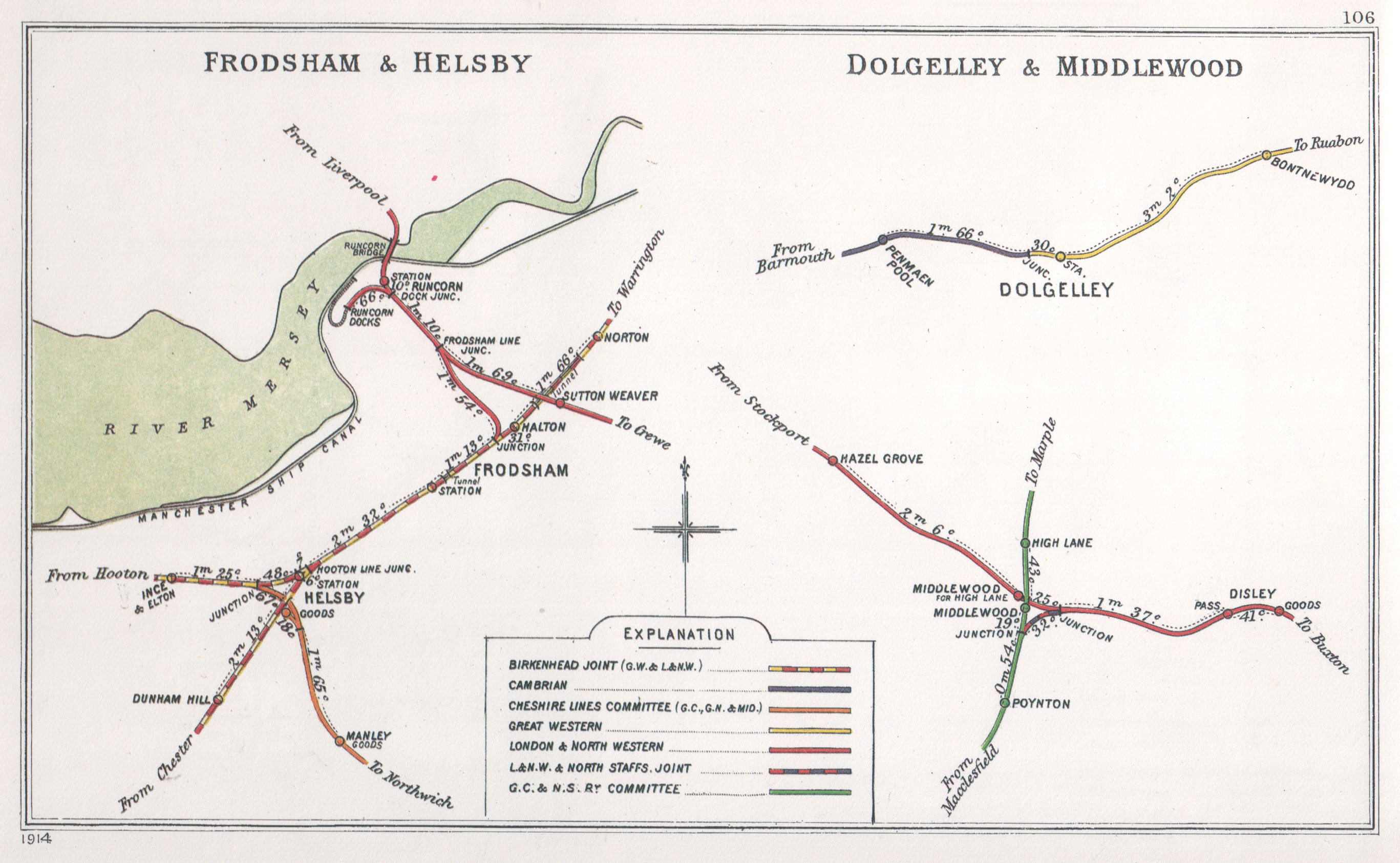
Frodsham & Helsby 1914

In 1865, before the line opened in 1869, the WCR became part of the Cheshire Lines Committee (CLC) and it was not long afterwards, in 1875, that the CLC opened its extension to Chester which effectively turned the Helsby branch into a goods branch, this affected how the branch was operated, the station had a chequered, and confusing, history of openings:

- The station opened for goods traffic on 1 September 1869 and to passengers on 22 June 1870.
- The station closed to passengers on 1 May 1875.
- Mitchell & Smith (2013) state that a limited passenger service was operated from Birkenhead to Knutsford calling at Helsby and Alvanley on summer Thursdays and Sundays between May 1934 and September 1939, and that trains operated intermittently between Helsby and Alvanley and Hooton for BICC workers between 8 July 1935 and 6 January 1964.
- These dates almost match those provided by Bolger (1984) and Butt (1990) that the station reopened to passengers in October 1936 before closing to passengers again on 22 May 1944.
- The same sources have the station reopening again on 9 September 1963 and closing to passengers on 6 January 1964.
- The station closed to goods on 2 March 1964 except for a privately owned siding.
- The line was closed completely on 14 September 1991.

Construction of the link beyond the station to connect with the Birkenhead Railway at West Cheshire Junction was delayed and the junction (Note: The junction was known as the West Cheshire Junction according to Dyckhoff (1999) and as Helsby Junction in RCH maps) did not open until 14 June 1871.

== Facilities ==
The passenger station had a single platform with a two-storey station building. On the other side of Chester Road was a goods siding equipped with a 5-ton crane, there were sidings for the Runcorn and Helsby Stone Co. and BICC (in 1904 it was still the Telegraph Manufacturing Co.). Locomotives had been stabled and turned here since the lines opening as there was a need to change engines to access the Birkenhead Railway as running powers over their railway had not been granted. A two-road engine shed was provided between 1893 and 1929.

Preceding station	Disused railways	Following station
Ince and Elton; Line and station open	Cheshire Lines Committee; West Cheshire Railway	Manley; Line and station closed
