= Mouldsworth railway station =

Railway station in Cheshire, England

Coordinates: 53.232°N 2.732°W

Mouldsworth
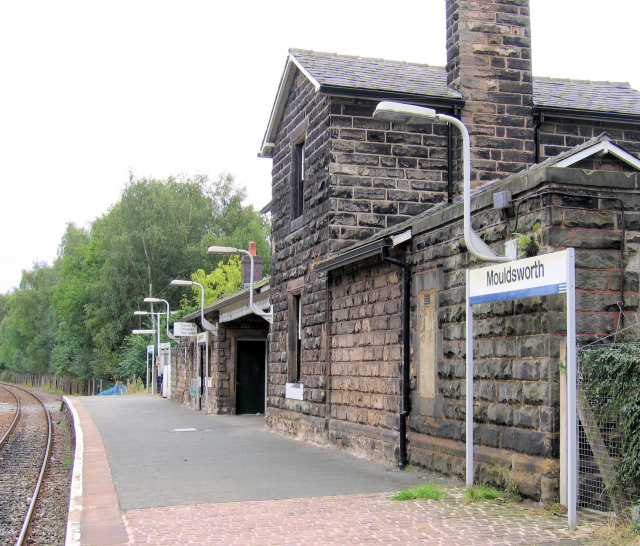

General information
- Location: Mouldsworth, Cheshire West and Chester; England
- Grid reference: SJ512707
- Manager: Northern Trains
- Platforms: 2

Other information
- Station code: MLD
- Classification: DfT category F2

History
- Opened: 22 June 1870

Passengers
- 2021/22: ▲25,446
- 2022/23: ▲25,712
- 2023/24: ▲26,708
- 2024/25: ▼25,904
- 2025/26: ▲27,986
Location
Notes
- Passenger statistics from the Office of Rail and Road

Mouldsworth railway station serves the village of Mouldsworth, in Cheshire, England. The station has two platforms and is a stop on the Mid Cheshire Line, which runs between Manchester Piccadilly and Chester. It is managed by Northern Trains, which also manages all services that stop here.

== History ==
The station and railway here first opened in 1869 for goods and on 22 June 1870 for passengers, on the line from Northwich to West Cheshire Junction (near Helsby); the extension line from here to Chester was added in November 1874 (1 May 1875 for passengers). At the same time, passenger services on the Helsby line, via Manley, ceased and Manley station was closed to passengers, however the line remained open for freight until 1991 and Mouldsworth Junction was managed by a signal box at the end of the platform.

Mouldsworth station had a coal yard, which opened in March 1871, and from here James Lowe delivered coal to many villages in the local area. The coal yard was in use until at least 1954, as it was listed at that time by the National Coal Board. The coal yard, goods yard (including goods shed), and sidings on both sides of the track were controlled by a second signal box, which went out of use in 1967 and is now in use at Chinnor on the Chinnor and Princes Risborough Railway.

Next to the station was the Station Hotel, which opened around May 1882; since at least the 1970s, it has been named the Goshawk. The hotel has had a bowling green next to it since at least 1891.

Services used to run to the CLC terminus at Chester Northgate, but this closed in October 1969. Trains henceforth used a connection onto the former Birkenhead Joint Railway main line at Mickle Trafford (where the two lines ran adjacent to each other) to reach Chester General. As part of this rationalisation work, the Mouldsworth to Mickle Trafford section was also reduced to a single line. In the opposite direction, the closure of Manchester Central earlier that year saw eastbound services diverted to start/terminate at Manchester Oxford Road.

The station used to be a request stop, but this status was removed at the spring 2011 timetable change.

The signal box here was decommissioned and demolished in 2006, control of the line then passing to Mickle Trafford box. The West Cheshire Railway line from Helsby closed to passengers as long ago as May 1875 (following the opening of the Chester line), but once carried significant volumes of oil and petrochemical traffic from the refineries near Stanlow and Thornton towards Crewe and points south via Middlewich. A change in distribution methods at the refinery led to this all but disappearing by the end of 1990. A few months later, a major fire seriously damaged the signal box at Helsby West Cheshire Junction and this led to the immediate closure of the line on 14 September 1991. The disused track remained intact until 1995, when it was lifted. The old formation is still just visible at the western end of the station, but it is now heavily overgrown and inaccessible.

As of the December 2008 timetable, there were two additional weekday peak services to and from Stockport. On Sundays, a two-hourly service to Chester and Manchester was introduced, with the latter continuing to Southport, via Wigan Wallgate and Bolton. Prior to the new service, trains to Manchester had not operated on Sundays since the early 1990s. Passengers had to change at Altrincham on to the Manchester Metrolink to continue their journeys.

Services beyond Manchester were terminated in the May 2010 timetable change, with all current trains now calling at Manchester Piccadilly and no further. Additional weekday peak services to/from Stockport were suspended in 2020.

== Facilities ==
Like most others on the route, the station is unstaffed. A ticket vending machine is in place for purchase of tickets or promise to pay coupons and for the collection of pre-paid tickets. Train running information is provided through electronic displays and posters. The main buildings on the Chester-bound platform are in private occupation, but waiting shelters are provided on both platforms. Step-free access is only available on the Chester-bound platform.

== Services ==
The standard service is one train per hour in each direction between Chester and Manchester Piccadilly; there are 18 trains per day to Chester, with 17 running towards Manchester. On Sundays, there is a two-hourly service each way, with 7 trains in each direction.

Services are run by Northern Trains' Class 150 and Class 156 diesel multiple units.

Preceding station	National Rail	Following station
Chester	Northern Trains; Mid-Cheshire Line	Delamere
	Disused railways	
Manley; Line and station closed	Cheshire Lines Committee; West Cheshire Line	Terminus
	Historical railways	
Barrow for Tarvin; Line open, station closed	Cheshire Lines Committee; West Cheshire Line	Delamere; Line and station open

== Proposed future developments ==
There have been repeated plans for a half-hourly service in each direction, as part of the 2015 franchise agreement; however, this has been delayed due to capacity constraints between Stockport and Manchester and, as of January 2022, is yet to be implemented.

As part of Northern's proposed December 2022 timetable, which focused on additional services within the Manchester area, an additional two trains per day in each direction between Chester and Stockport have been proposed during peak hours. These services are aimed at those who are commuting to and/or working in Manchester and Stockport; it would increase the number of trains to 20 per day in each direction.
