= Manley railway station =

Former railway station England

Manley

General information
- Location: Manley, Cheshire West and Chester; England
- Coordinates: 53.2422°N 2.7570°W
- Grid reference: SJ494719

Other information
- Status: Disused

History
- Original company: Cheshire Lines Committee
- Pre-grouping: Cheshire Lines Committee
- Post-grouping: Cheshire Lines Committee

Key dates
- 22 June 1870: Opened
- 1 May 1875: Closed to passengers
- 6 March 1961: Closed
Location

Manley railway station was located to the west of Manley, Cheshire, England. The station was opened by the Cheshire Lines Committee on 22 June 1870, closed to passengers on 1 May 1875 and closed completely on 6 March 1961.

Preceding station	Disused railways	Following station
Helsby and Alvanley; Line and station closed	Cheshire Lines Committee; West Cheshire Railway	Mouldsworth; Line and station open
