= Middlewich railway station =

Former railway station in Cheshire, England

Coordinates: 53.1941°N 2.4403°W

Middlewich
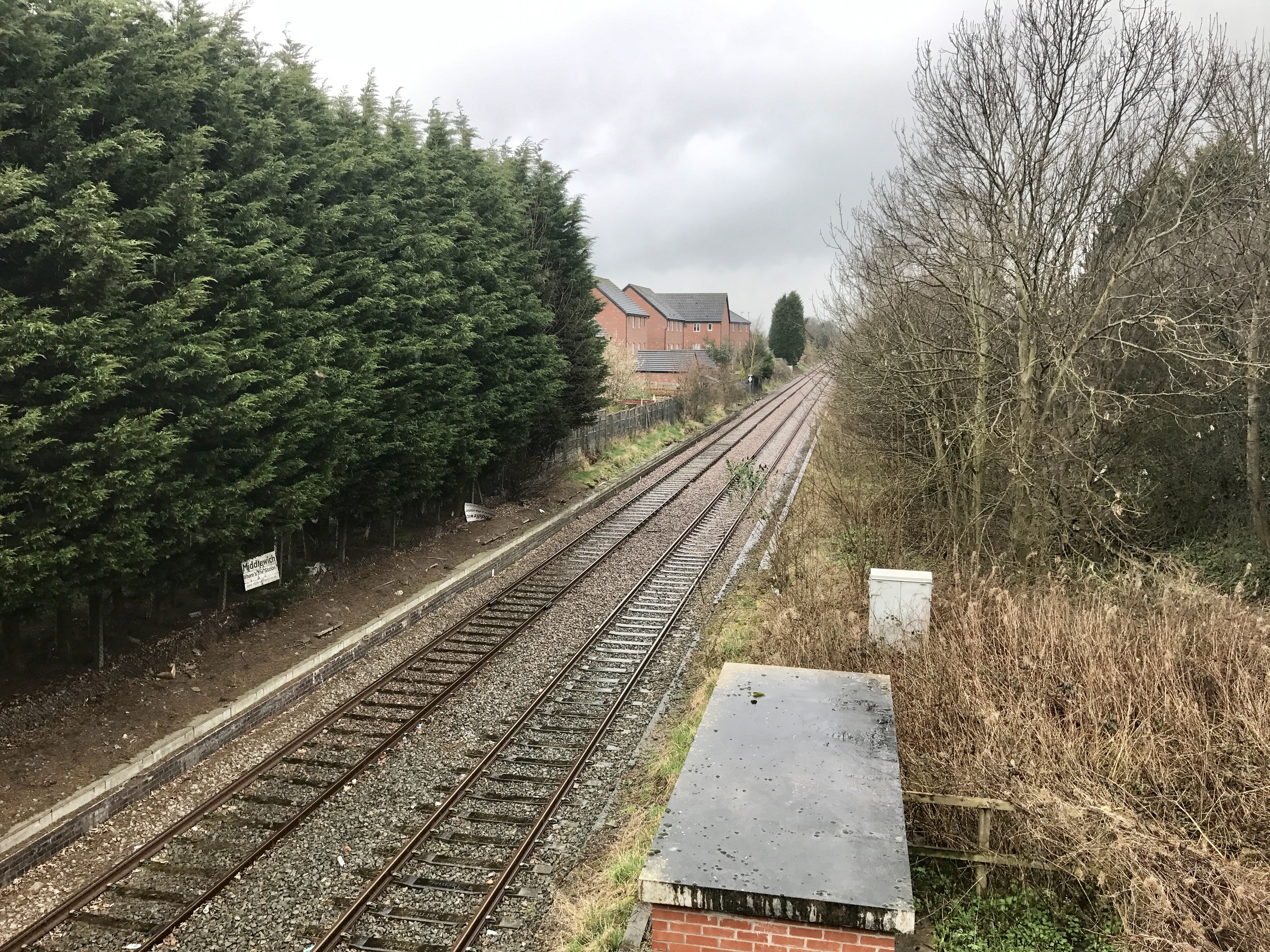
- Location of the former station (2017)

General information
- Location: Middlewich, Cheshire East; England
- Grid reference: SJ707664
- Platforms: 2

Other information
- Status: Disused

History
- Original company: London and North Western Railway
- Post-grouping: London, Midland and Scottish Railway; London Midland Region of British Railways

Key dates
- 1 July 1868: Opened
- 4 January 1960: Closed to passengers
- 27 November 1967: Closed to freight
Location

Middlewich railway station served the town of Middlewich, in Cheshire, England, between 1868 and 1960. It lay on a branch line between Sandbach and Northwich. The Mid Cheshire Rail Users' Association is campaigning for the reopening of the line to passenger traffic and the construction of a new station at Middlewich.

The station stood on the branch line that was built primarily to serve the industries between Sandbach and Northwich. Most revenue came from the Cheshire salt mines before its transport switched to road haulage; chemical factories also used the branch with sidings serving the bigger factories. Middlewich station had a sizeable goods depot for freight and parcels office for public use. With the withdrawal of passenger services, the Middlewich branch continues to be used by freight trains, empty coaching stock movements and for occasional train diversions.

== History ==
=== Passenger service ===
The branch line and Middlewich station were built by the London and North Western Railway (LNWR) during 1867–1868. The railway line was completed in November 1867 and was used initially by goods trains. The station was opened for passenger use on 1 July 1868. Provisions had been made for the doubling of the line in the event of sufficient demand, but this option was never exercised. It would be operated by the London Midland & Scottish Railway (LMSR) after the railway grouping of 1 January 1923.

Passenger services operated between Crewe to Middlewich and Northwich, via Sandbach. Some trains reversed at Northwich, then continued to Hartford and Greenbank and then along a short stretch of the West Coast Main Line (WCML) to Acton Bridge. In 1885, the LNWR initiated a through carriage on weekdays from Manchester Oxford Road to Middlewich, via Northwich, and on to London Euston.

For example, in July 1922, there were nine trains a day to Crewe to Northwich, of which five continued to Acton Bridge. There was an additional morning train from and to Crewe that reversed at Middlewich. A departing service from Manchester at 10:30 would pick passengers up at major stations to Northwich, calling at Middlewich at 11:30. The carriage reached Crewe at 11:50, where the steam loco detached and the carriage was attached to a Liverpool to Euston express, reaching the capital at 15:10. The northbound service left Euston at 14:30, reaching Middlewich at 18:10. The services to Euston had ceased by World War II.

By August 1946, the local passenger service had been reduced to six trains each way between Crewe, Middlewich and Northwich, each offering only third class accommodation. The LMSR was nationalised by British Railways on 1 January 1948 and the branch was thereafter operated by the London Midland Region.

Preceding station	Disused railways	Following station
Billinge Green Halt; Line open, station closed	London and North Western Railway; Northwich to Sandbach Branch	Cledford Bridge Halt; Line open, station closed

=== Halts ===
As the branch was 9 mi (14 km) in length, with just one main station at Middlewich, the LNWR decided to construct two railway halts to improve facilities for passengers in the locality. Cledford Bridge Halt was located between Sandbach and Middlewich; it opened in January 1911. Billinge Green Halt was located between Middlewich and Northwich and opened during 1914. Both halts were closed by the LMSR on 2 March 1942.

=== Closure ===
Middlewich station shared in the common experience of a drastic reduction of services during the war and for years after. Passenger numbers were never particularly high; significantly more of the line's revenue was being extracted by its freight traffic instead. By January 1956, the passenger service offered just four third-class only trains each way on weekdays and none on Sundays.

Unlike many other lines, services were not increased after 1956. The station closed when regular passenger trains were withdrawn from the branch on 4 January 1960. Despite this, the station continued to be used by goods traffic until November 1967.

The up platform building was demolished in the late 1960s; the down buildings and signal box saw the same fate in 1980.

== The site and line today ==
The platforms and station master's house are still extant, with all other traces of the station removed.

The nearest railway station is now at Winsford, 2.3 miles (3.7 km) away on the WCML.

The line through the station continues to be in operation; freight services regularly use the line through Middlewich to get from the West Coast Main Line at Sandbach and nearby Crewe to the Mid-Cheshire line at Northwich.

The Crewe and Chester Line is known to flood during severe weather. When this happens, or during engineering work, the line is closed and some Avanti West Coast services between London, Chester and Holyhead are diverted through Middlewich instead. Transport for Wales services are replaced by buses instead and do not use the line. As the section where the station used to be remains dual-tracked on the otherwise single-tracked line, diverted Avanti West Coast services are timed for one service to wait at the station's location while another passes or may instead run via Warrington. Due to the line's low speed, travelling from Crewe to Chester via Middlewich takes approximately one hour, compared to 20 minutes using the Crewe and Chester Line.

== Future proposals ==
The Mid Cheshire Rail Users' Association is presently campaigning for the reintroduction of passenger services on the Sandbach - Northwich line, with the construction of a new station at Middlewich; though not necessarily in the same location as the original. The campaign received a boost in July 2018 when it was announced that the government had requested a strategic outline business plan into the reopening of the line to passenger traffic.

The business case is to be handled by Cheshire East Council, in conjunction with Cheshire West and Chester Council and the Cheshire and Warrington Local Enterprise Partnership; it will look into the cost and benefits of reopening the line and the building of new stations at Middlewich and Gadbrook Park.

In October 2021, £50,000 was made available for a feasibility study into reopening the line.
