= Lostock Gralam railway station =

Railway station in Cheshire, England

Coordinates: 53.268°N 2.465°W

Lostock Gralam
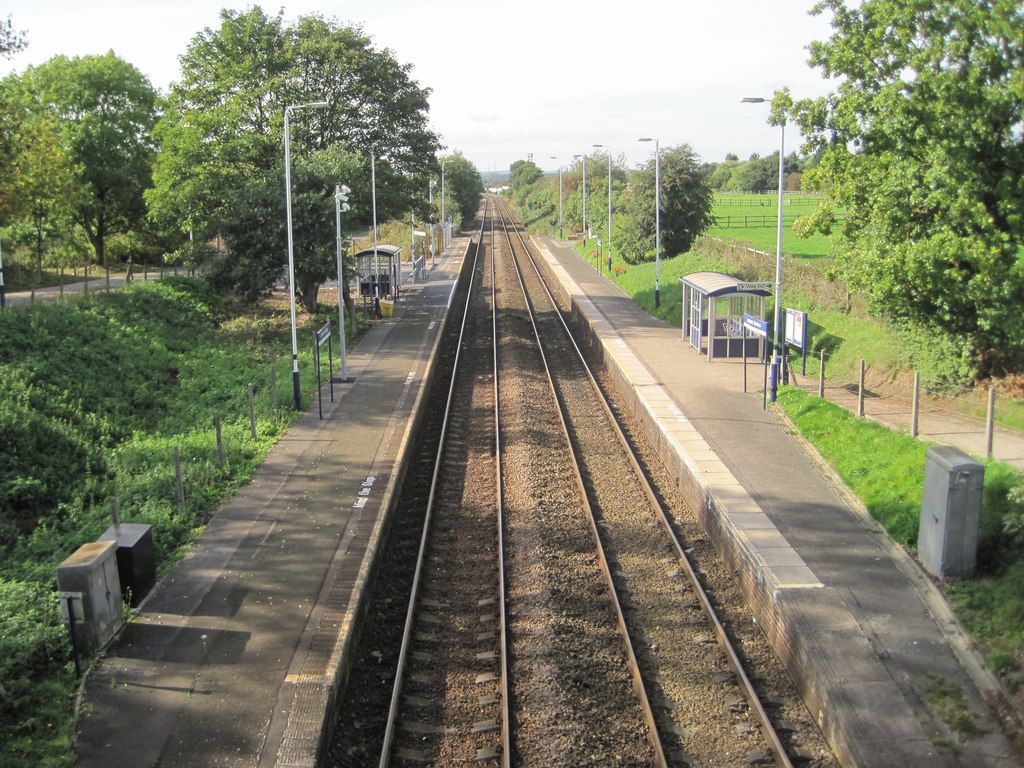
- View west towards Northwich and Chester in 2013

General information
- Location: Lostock Gralam, Cheshire West and Chester; England
- Grid reference: SJ690746
- Managed by: Northern Trains
- Platforms: 2

Other information
- Station code: LTG
- Classification: DfT category F2

History
- Opened: 1 January 1863

Passengers
- 2020/21: ▼17,744
- 2021/22: ▲43,012
- 2022/23: ▲54,108
- 2023/24: ▲54,324
- 2024/25: ▲60,696
Location
Notes
- Passenger statistics from the Office of Rail and Road

Lostock Gralam railway station serves the village of Lostock Gralam in Cheshire, England. The station is on the Mid-Cheshire line from Chester to Manchester Piccadilly, 18½ miles (30 km) east of Chester.

== History ==
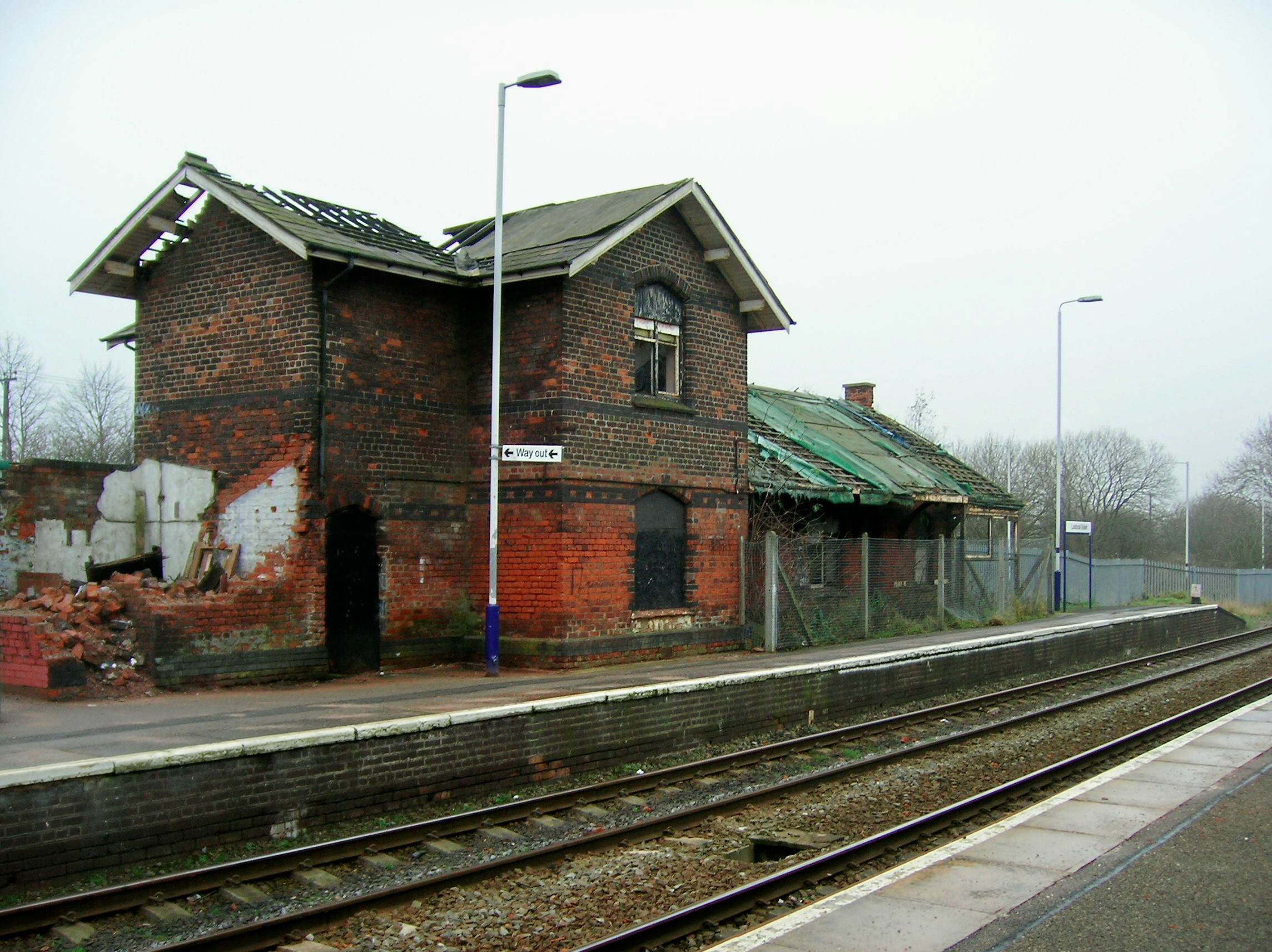
Lostock Gralam railway station (building now demolished)

The station opened for passengers as Lostock on 1 January 1863 as part of the Cheshire Midland Railway. The station was renamed to Lostock Gralam later in 1863. Goods traffic started from 1 May 1863; the goods yard was to the south of the station and was equipped with a 5-ton crane. The goods yard closed on 3 August 1964. For many years the station had a run-down appearance and had been downgraded to a request stop. The main station building was demolished on 8 July 2007.

As of the December 2008 timetable, there were two additional weekday peak services to and from Stockport. On Sundays, a two-hourly service to Chester and Manchester was introduced, with the latter continuing to Southport, via Wigan Wallgate and Bolton. Prior to the new service, trains to Manchester had not operated on Sundays since the early 1990s. Passengers had to change at Altrincham on to the Manchester Metrolink to continue their journeys.

Services beyond Manchester were terminated in May 2010, with all current trains now calling at Manchester Piccadilly and no further. Additional weekday peak services to/from Stockport were suspended in 2020.

== Facilities ==
As a result of the Lostock Triangle development, the station is no longer a request stop. In the summer of 2011, new passenger shelters were constructed on both platforms. Prior to this, there had been no protection from the weather for passengers on the Manchester-bound platform. The station is unstaffed, so tickets must be bought on the train or prior to travel. Train running details are offered via digital display screens (fitted in 2015), telephone and timetable posters. Step-free access is available only on the Manchester-bound platform.

== Services ==
From Monday to Saturday, the station gets one train per hour westbound to Chester and one train per hour eastbound to Manchester Piccadilly. 18 trains per day run to Chester, with 17 running towards Manchester. On Sundays, there is a two-hourly service each way, with 7 trains in each direction. The majority of services are run by Northern Class 150 trains, with some Class 156s also serving the station.

Preceding station	National Rail	Following station
Northwich	Northern Trains; Mid-Cheshire Line	Plumley

There have been plans for a half-hourly service in each direction – it was a part of the 2015 franchise agreement – but this has been repeatedly delayed due to capacity constraints between Stockport and Manchester and is yet, as of January 2022, to be implemented.

== Proposed future developments ==
As part of Northern's proposed December 2022 timetable (which focuses on additional services within the Manchester area), an additional 4 trains per day between Chester and Stockport (2 in each direction) have been proposed during peak hours on Mondays to Saturdays. These services are aimed at those who are commuting to and/or working in Manchester and Stockport. This change will increase the number of trains departing Chester on the line to 20 per day, with the number departing Stockport also increased to 20 per day. The 2-hourly Sunday service will remain the same, at 7 trains per day.
