= Plumley railway station =

Railway station in Cheshire, England

Coordinates: 53.275°N 2.420°W

Plumley
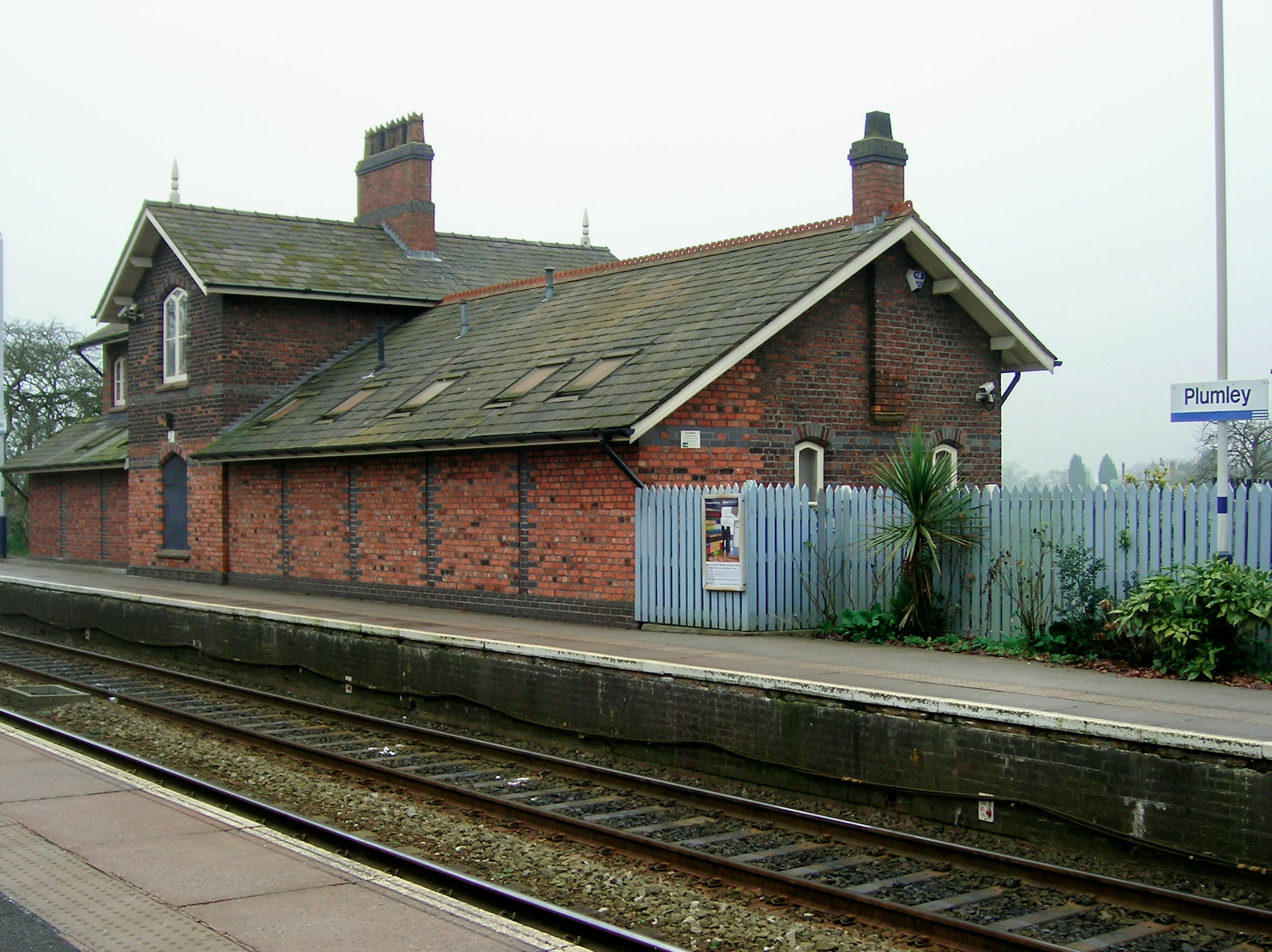
- Plumley railway station in 2006

General information
- Location: Plumley, Cheshire East; England
- Grid reference: SJ721754
- Manager: Northern Trains
- Platforms: 2

Other information
- Station code: PLM
- Classification: DfT category F2

Key dates
- 1 January 1863: Station opened as Plumbley
- 1 February 1945: Station renamed to Plumley

Passengers
- 2021/22: ▲12,812
- 2022/23: ▲14,790
- 2023/24: ▲16,552
- 2024/25: ▲18,548
- 2025/26: ▲22,134
Location
Notes
- Passenger statistics from the Office of Rail and Road

Plumley railway station serves the village of Plumley in Cheshire, England. The station is 20½ miles (33 km) east of Chester on the Mid-Cheshire Line to Manchester Piccadilly.

== History ==
The station was opened as Plumbley railway station on 1 January 1863 as part of the Cheshire Midland Railway. The station was renamed to Plumley on 1 February 1945. Goods traffic started from 1 May 1863, the goods yard was to the north of the station and was equipped with a 5-ton crane. The goods yard closed on 3 February 1963. There was an additional station 65 chains (1,300 m) west of Plumbley called Plumbley West Platform which opened for passengers around 1915 but was closed by September 1926.

As of the December 2008 timetable, there were two additional weekday peak services to and from Stockport. On Sundays, a two-hourly service to Chester and Manchester was introduced, with the latter continuing to Southport, via Wigan Wallgate and Bolton. Prior to the new service, trains to Manchester had not operated on Sundays since the early 1990s. Passengers had to change at Altrincham on to the Manchester Metrolink to continue their journeys.

Services beyond Manchester were terminated in the May 2010 timetable change, with all current trains now calling at Manchester Piccadilly and no further. Additional weekday peak services to/from Stockport were suspended in 2020.

== Facilities ==
The station is unstaffed and has basic amenities only (waiting shelters, CIS displays and timetable poster boards). A ticket vending machine is in place for purchase of tickets or promise to pay coupons and for the collection of pre-paid tickets. A public telephone is also provided to offer train running information. The main building is now privately owned and used as commercial premises. Step-free access is available to both platforms.

== Service ==
The station gets one train per hour westbound to Chester and one train per hour eastbound to Manchester Piccadilly Monday to Saturday. 18 trains per day run to Chester, with 17 running towards Manchester. On Sundays, there is a two-hourly service each way, with 7 trains in each direction. The majority of services are run by Northern Class 150 trains, with some Class 156's also serving the station.

Preceding station	National Rail	Following station
Lostock Gralam	Northern Trains; Mid-Cheshire Line	Knutsford

There have been repeated plans for a half-hourly service in each direction - it was a part of the 2015 franchise agreement - though this has been repeatedly delayed due to capacity constraints between Stockport and Manchester and is yet, as of January 2022, to be implemented.

== Proposed future developments ==
As part of Northern's proposed December 2022 timetable (which focuses on additional services within the Manchester area), an additional 4 trains per day between Chester and Stockport (2 in each direction) have been proposed during peak hours on Mondays to Saturdays. These services are aimed at those who are commuting to and/or working in Manchester and Stockport. This change will increase the number of trains departing Chester on the line to 20 per day, with the number departing Stockport also increased to 20 per day. The 2 hourly Sunday service will remain the same, at 7 trains per day.
