= Cledford Bridge Halt railway station =

Former railway station in England

Cledford Bridge Halt

General information
- Location: Middlewich, Cheshire East; England
- Coordinates: 53.1821°N 2.4285°W
- Grid reference: SJ713651
- Platforms: 1

Other information
- Status: Disused

History
- Original company: London and North Western Railway
- Pre-grouping: London and North Western Railway
- Post-grouping: London, Midland and Scottish Railway

Key dates
- 2 January 1911: Opened
- 2 March 1942: Closed
Location

Cledford Bridge Halt railway station was located in Middlewich, Cheshire, England. The station was opened by the London and North Western Railway on 2 January 1911, the station closed on 2 March 1942. The platform was situated on an embankment on the south side of Cledford Lane over-bridge and was accessed by steps from the lane.

Preceding station	Disused railways	Following station
Middlewich; Line open, station closed	London and North Western Railway; Northwich to Sandbach Branch	Sandbach; Line and station open
