= Mobberley railway station =

Railway station in Cheshire, England

Coordinates: 53.330°N 2.333°W

Mobberley
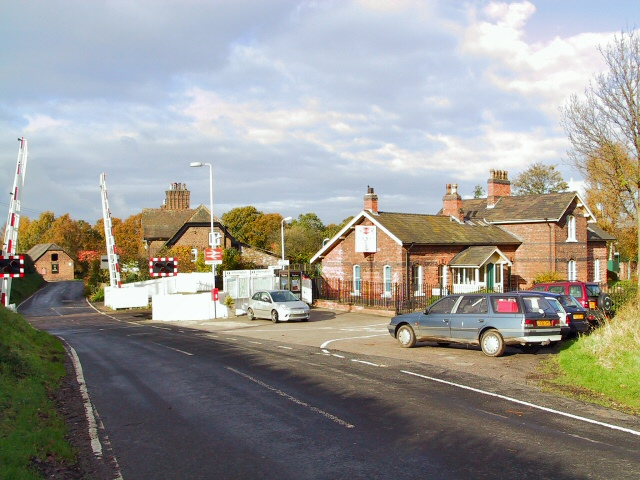
- The station entrance in 2005

General information
- Location: Mobberley, Cheshire, England
- Grid reference: SJ778814
- Manager: Northern Trains
- Platforms: 2

Other information
- Station code: MOB
- Classification: DfT category F2

History
- Opened: 1862

Passengers
- 2021/22: ▲15,376
- 2022/23: ▲16,690
- 2023/24: ▲19,578
- 2024/25: ▲22,512
- 2025/26: ▼21,806
Location
Notes
- Passenger statistics from the Office of Rail and Road

Mobberley railway station serves the village of Mobberley, in Cheshire, England. It lies to the north of the village and is managed by Northern Trains. The station is 18½ miles (30 km) south of Manchester Piccadilly on the Mid-Cheshire line towards Chester.

== History ==
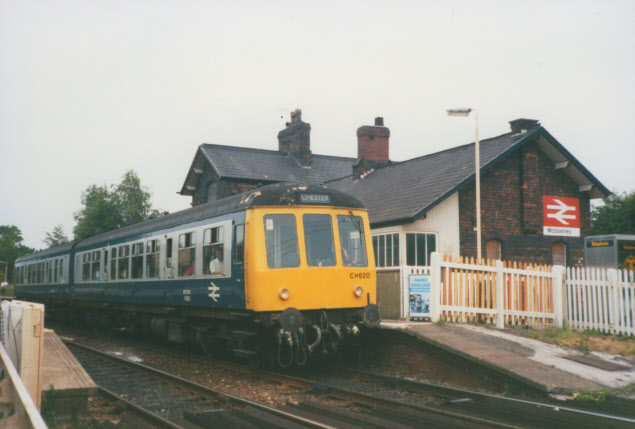
Mobberley railway station in 1990

The station was opened on 12 May 1862 by the Cheshire Midland Railway, which was absorbed by the Cheshire Lines Committee on 15 August 1867. It passed on to the London Midland Region of British Railways on nationalisation in 1948. When sectorisation was introduced in the 1980s, the station was served by Regional Railways until the privatisation of British Rail.

The station retains many of its original features and buildings, although these have been converted for residential use.

== Facilities ==
The station is unstaffed and has no ticket machine, so all tickets must be purchased in advance of travel or on the train. The main building is in private commercial use, but there are brick shelters on each platform, along with CIS displays, timetable poster boards and a bike rack on platform 2. A pay phone at the entrance can also be used to request train running information. Step-free access to both platforms is available via ramps from the level crossing at the Manchester end of the station.

The station has retained its staffed signal box.

== Services ==
On Mondays to Saturdays, there is an hourly service westbound to Chester and eastbound to Stockport and Manchester Piccadilly. On Sundays, the service is two-hourly.

Preceding station	National Rail	Following station
Knutsford	Northern Trains; Mid-Cheshire Line	Ashley
