= Billinge Green Halt railway station =

Disused railway station in Tilbury, Thurrock, England

Billinge Green Halt
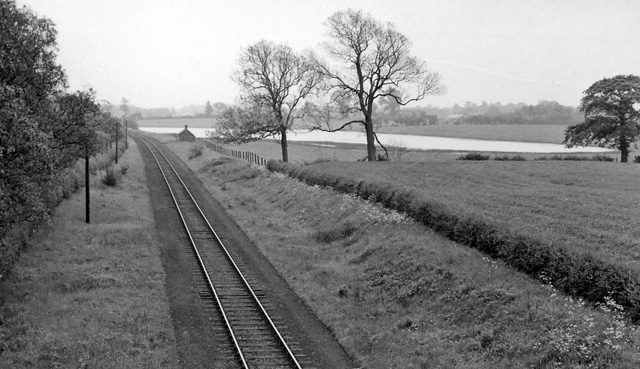
- The site of Billinge Green Halt in 1961

General information
- Location: Davenham, Cheshire West and Chester; England
- Coordinates: 53.2381°N 2.4805°W
- Grid reference: SJ679713
- Platforms: 1

Other information
- Status: Disused

History
- Original company: London and North Western Railway
- Pre-grouping: London and North Western Railway
- Post-grouping: London, Midland and Scottish Railway

Key dates
- 1 October 1914: Opened
- 2 March 1942: Closed
Location

Billinge Green Halt railway station was located in Davenham, Cheshire, England. The station was opened by the London and North Western Railway on 1 October 1914, the station closed on 2 March 1942.

| Preceding station | Disused railways | Following station |
|---|---|---|
| Northwich; Line and station open | London and North Western Railway; Northwich to Sandbach Branch | Middlewich; Line open, station closed |
