= Acton Bridge railway station =

Railway station in Cheshire, England

Acton Bridge
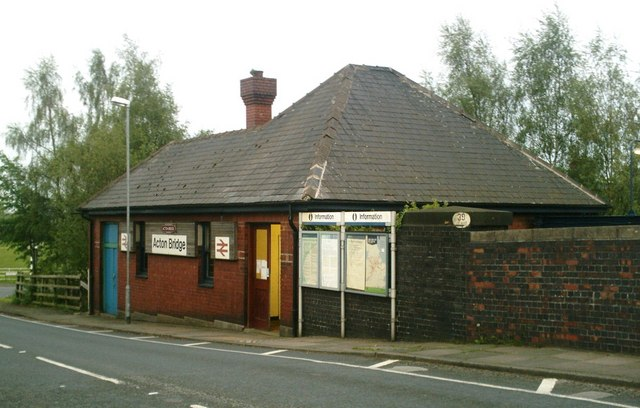

General information
- Location: Acton Bridge, Borough of Cheshire West and Chester; England
- Coordinates: 53.2664°N 2.6029°W
- Grid reference: SJ598745
- Manager: London Northwestern Railway
- Platforms: 3

Other information
- Station code: ACB
- Classification: DfT category F2

Key dates
- 4 July 1837: Station opens as Acton
- 1 July 1870: Station renamed Acton Bridge

Passengers
- 2021/22: ▲30,838
- 2022/23: ▲33,040
- 2023/24: ▲44,682
- 2024/25: ▲54,980
- 2025/26: ▲61,974
Location
Notes
- Passenger statistics from the Office of Rail and Road

Acton Bridge railway station serves the villages of Acton Bridge and Weaverham, in Cheshire, England. The station is situated on the West Coast Main Line and is served by regular trains between Liverpool Lime Street and Birmingham New Street.

== History ==
Acton Bridge opened as Acton by the Grand Junction Railway in 1837, but was renamed Acton Bridge in 1870. After merging into the London and North Western Railway, the company became part of the London, Midland and Scottish Railway during the Grouping of 1923.

The line then passed on to the London Midland Region of British Railways upon nationalisation in 1948. In addition to its main line calls, the station also served as the terminus of a local service from Crewe via Sandbach and Northwich until 1942. This used a connecting curve that diverged from the main line just north of Hartford to join the Cheshire Lines Committee line from Altrincham to Chester Northgate, near Greenbank, which remains in use for freight traffic only.

When sectorisation was introduced, the station was served by Regional Railways until the privatisation of British Rail. Trains of the InterCity sector passed through on express services along the West Coast Main Line.

When British Rail was privatised, Acton Bridge was served by Central Trains until 2007 and then served by London Midland until 2017, before transferring most recently onto London Northwestern Railway. The latter briefly provided services beyond Birmingham all the way to London Euston until the drop in demand caused by the COVID-19 pandemic meant that this was unviable; as a result, the service was cut once more to terminate at Birmingham New Street, via Crewe and Wolverhampton.

== Facilities ==
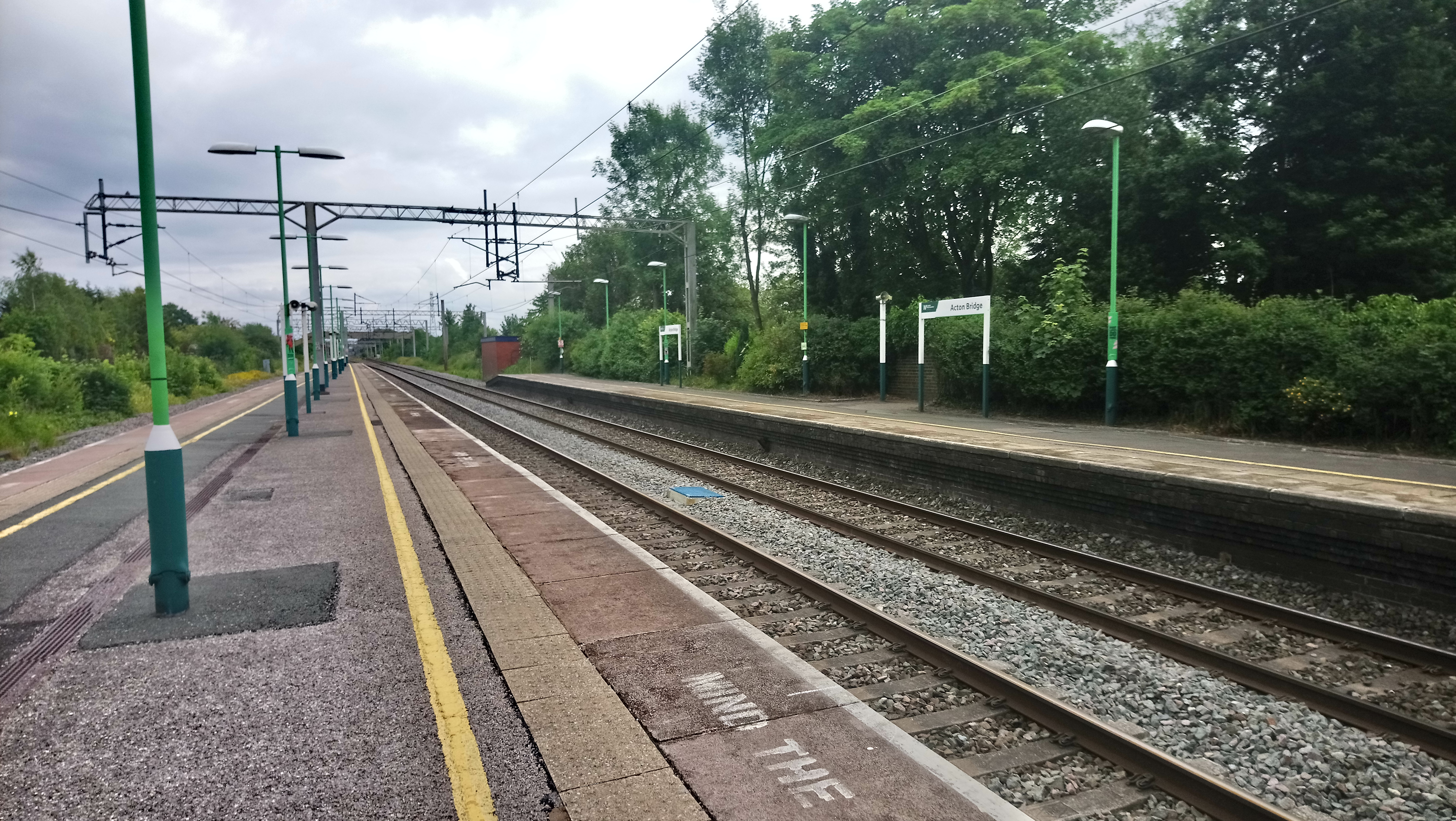
The view from platform 2, looking south towards Crewe

Acton Bridge is unstaffed, although tickets can be purchased from a self-service ticket machine, which is located inside the booking hall. There is no wheelchair access, as all platforms can only be accessed by steps from the footbridge. The station has limited bus connections and a small car park with 15 spaces. Each platform has rudimentary waiting shelters and help points.

The station and its gardens are maintained by volunteers from Acton Bridge Women's Institute; it won a commendation in the 2003 JPD Best Kept Station competition.

== Services ==
On weekdays and Saturdays, Acton Bridge is served by one train per hour in each direction between Liverpool Lime Street and Birmingham New Street, operated by London Northwestern Railway. These services start later on Sundays and run once an hour from mid-morning.

Most trains, particularly southbound, use the centre platforms on the main line but, when a train is delayed or there is disruption, some southbound services may use the relief line platform instead.

Just south of the station, the line widens from double track to four lines, with two being not only relief lines but also providing connections onto the Chester–Manchester line via Greenbank and Northwich; this link is used primarily by freight.

Avanti West Coast inter-city trains pass through the station but do not stop.

Preceding station	National Rail	Following station
Runcorn towards Liverpool Lime Street	London Northwestern Railway Birmingham–Liverpool	Hartford towards Birmingham New Street
Historical Railways
Hartford	London and North Western Railway; Grand Junction Railway	Preston Brook

== Sources ==
- Butt, R. V. J. (October 1995). The Directory of Railway Stations: details every public and private passenger station, halt, platform and stopping place, past and present (1st ed.). Sparkford: Patrick Stephens Ltd. ISBN 978-1-85260-508-7. OCLC 60251199. OL 11956311M.
- Jowett, Alan (2000). Jowett's Nationalised Railway Atlas (1st ed.). Penryn, Cornwall: Atlantic Transport Publishers. ISBN 978-0-906899-99-1. OCLC 228266687.
- Jowett, Alan (March 1989). Jowett's Railway Atlas of Great Britain and Ireland: From Pre-Grouping to the Present Day (1st ed.). Sparkford: Patrick Stephens Ltd. ISBN 978-1-85260-086-0. OCLC 22311137.
