= Elworth =

Village in Cheshire, England

Coordinates: 53.146°N 2.367°W

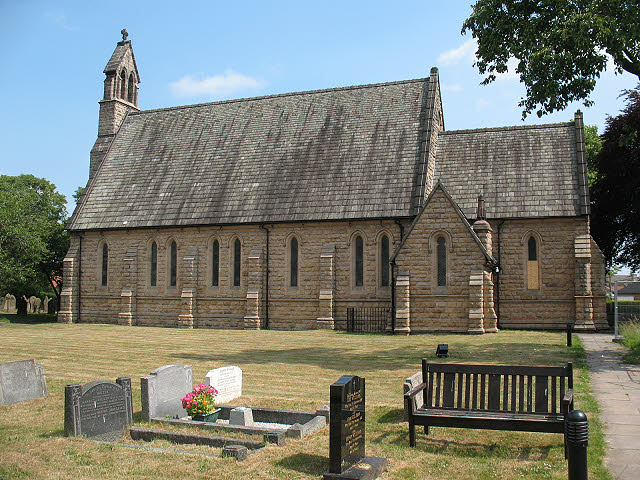
- St Peter's church

- Location within Cheshire
- Population: 4,412
- OS grid reference: SJ745615
  - London: 158 miles (254 km) SE
- Unitary authority: Cheshire East
- Ceremonial county: Cheshire
- Region: North West
- Country: England
- Sovereign state: United Kingdom
- Post town: SANDBACH
- Postcode district: CW11
- Dialling code: 01270
- Police: Cheshire
- Fire: Cheshire
- Ambulance: North West
- UK Parliament: Congleton

Elworth is a village in the Cheshire East district of Cheshire, England. It is also a suburb of the town of Sandbach, located approximately one mile eastward.

Elworth is known for its industrial past, having historically been the home of Foden's HGV manufacturers. The village also features two churches, Mount Pleasant Methodist Church and St Peter's Church of England, the latter of which was designed by John Matthews; Elworth also features Sandbach railway station, which is on the line betweenCrewe and Manchester.

== History ==
In February 2010, St. Peter's Church Hall – the village's former school, and adjacent to St. Peter's church itself – was significantly damaged by a fire, the cause of which was, though never determined, thought to be electrical. The church hall had previously been used as a community centre, hosting a pre-school nursery, an after-school club, and many other community groups. Following a consultation, it was decided to demolish the original building, which had been deemed too badly damaged to be reparable, and to rebuild a new, purpose built hall in its place.

Work began in early 2011 with clearing the site, and building work began in May of the same year. The church hall officially re-opened in March 2012. The Methodist Church, nearby to St Peter's, continues to host the Boys' Brigade, Brownies, Under 4s, a painting group, badminton, pilates, Zumba, Tuesday coffee and light lunches, Thursday evening all-sorts and line dancing.

== Culture ==
=== Sports and recreation ===
One of the main sports played in Elworth is cricket; Elworth Cricket Club, based on London Road, play in the Premier Division of the ECB North Staffs & South Cheshire Cricket league. The club's junior section is recognised locally as one of the best in Cheshire. The club fields teams at 1st, 2nd and 3rd XI level for its senior players. For the juniors, the club has teams at U9, 11, 13, 15 and 18 levels. The club has achieved Clubmark and Focus Club status, and has strong links with local schools.

The club celebrated its 100th year in 2013; in the same year, after 86 years as tenants, the club purchased their home ground from its previous owners. The current Elworth professional is Yasir Ali. The club's 1st XI captain is Russell Ballard, supported by Alex Banks. Scott Elliot continues as 2nd XI captain.

Elworth also features a Sunday league football team, Elworth Park Rangers Football Club. Formed in 2016 and based at the local Fox Inn Pub, the team play in the Crewe Regional Sunday Football League Premier Division, having finished in 3rd in Division One, gaining promotion in the 2017/2018 season.

== Education ==
Elworth features two Primary Schools – Elworth CofE and Elworth Hall Primary School. At Secondary level, the village is served by two high schools based in Sandbach, Sandbach School and Sandbach High School & Sixth Form College.
