= Northwich railway station =

Railway station in Cheshire, England

Northwich
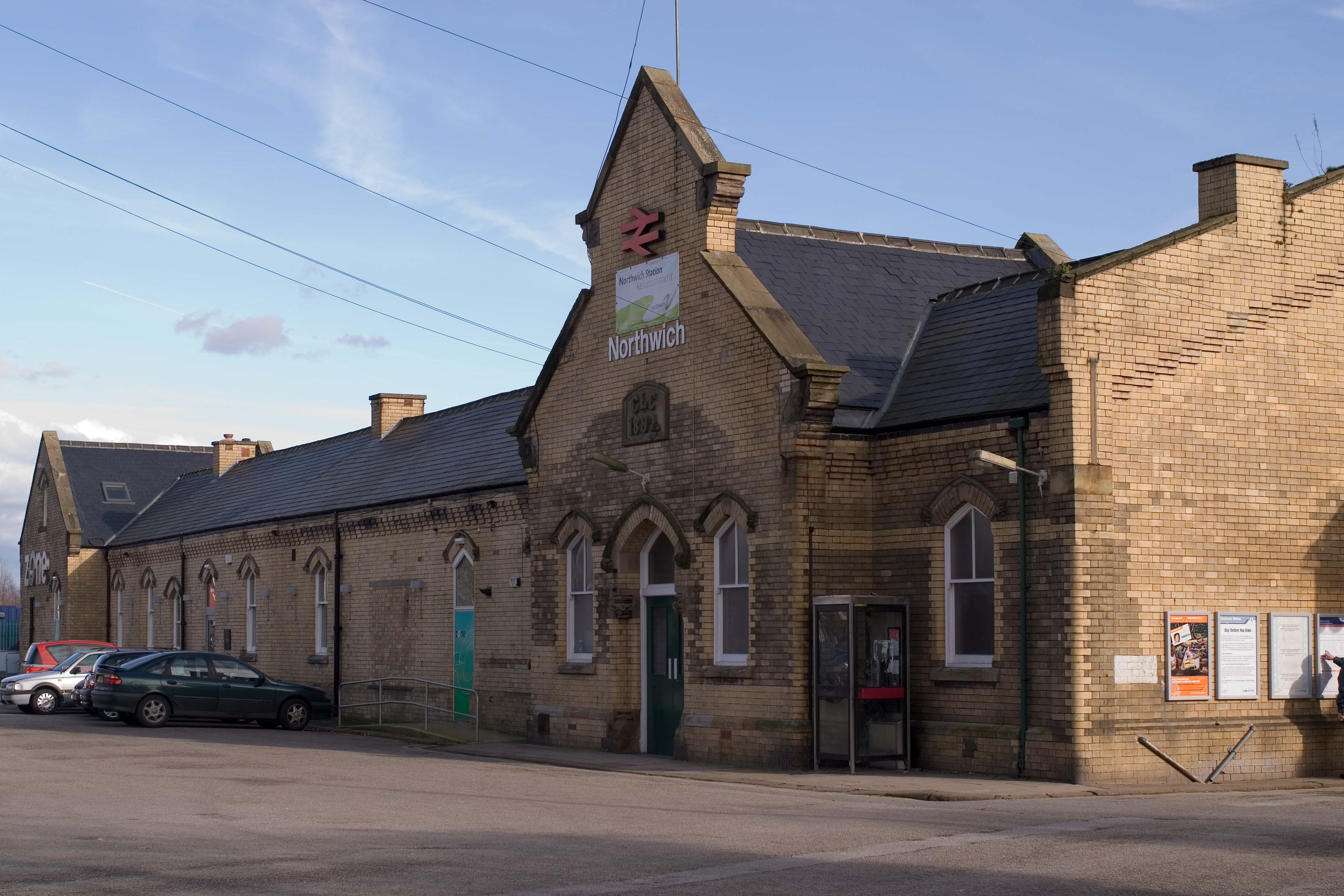
- Northwich station building

General information
- Location: Northwich, Cheshire West and Chester, England
- Coordinates: 53.261°N 2.497°W
- Grid reference: SJ669739
- Managed by: Northern Trains
- Platforms: 2

Other information
- Station code: NWI
- Classification: DfT category E

History
- Opened: 1 January 1863

Passengers
- 2020/21: ▼45,150
- 2021/22: ▲0.124 million
- 2022/23: ▲0.151 million
- 2023/24: ▲0.169 million
- 2024/25: ▲0.189 million
Location
Notes
- Passenger statistics from the Office of Rail and Road

Northwich railway station serves the town of Northwich, in Cheshire, England. The station has two platforms in use, with a third now disused and fenced off. On the Mid-Cheshire line, it is located 28 1/4 miles (45.5 km) south-west of Manchester Piccadilly.

== History ==
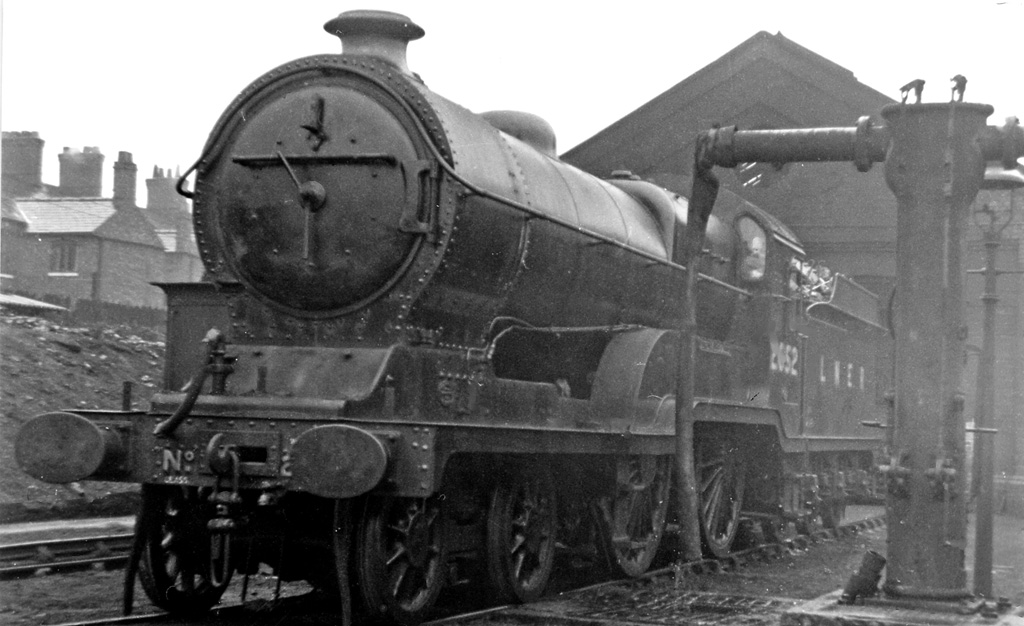
Ex-GC Robinson D10 'Director' 4-4-0 no. 2652 Edwin A. Beazley stands beside a water-column at Northwich depot, situated next to the Cheshire Lines Committee station

The first railway to reach the town was the Cheshire Midland Railway (CMR) route from Knutsford, which opened to traffic on 1 January 1863. The CMR was one of the constituent routes of the Cheshire Lines Committee (CLC) from its formation. The original CMR terminus station in Northwich was likely to be the building that became the goods station, but was replaced early, in 1869, as the continuing line towards Hartford was being constructed as part of the West Cheshire Railway (WCR).

Further lines to Sandbach, via Middlewich, which was opened in November 1867 by the London and North Western Railway, Helsby (the West Cheshire Railway, opened in 1869) and a short goods branch to Winnington (also opened in 1869) would complete the network of routes serving the area, with Chester Northgate being served from May 1875. As a result, Northwich was served by no fewer than four different pre-grouping railway companies. The LNWR also operated a number of its Sandbach and Crewe trains forward by reversing at Northwich, then continuing from here to Acton Bridge via Hartford and Greenbank station (now known as Greenbank) and the curve down to the West Coast Main Line at Hartford Junction.

The station expanded as the railway grew; by 1910, there were three platform faces, a bay for loading cattle, extensive goods sidings with a five-ton crane and a goods station. The CMR built a two-lane engine shed and turntable in 1869; the shed was doubled in size in 1877 and rebuilt around 1948, before closing to steam engines in 1968 and diesel in 1982.

Services were available to a variety of destinations. In 1872, most of the services were local, with nine daily trains each way to Manchester; both Oxford Road via the Manchester, South Junction and Altrincham Railway (MSJAR) and London Road via Stockport, Helsby and Winsford through services were available to Derby and London St Pancras. Additional destinations were gradually added as they became available, including Chester, Liverpool Central, Manchester Central, Sheffield and London Kings Cross.

Following the 1923 Grouping, Northwich remained a joint station; the CLC being jointly vested in the LNER and LMS, with the LMS taking over the Sandbach branch trains. Services to Acton Bridge ended during World War II, but the primary routes to Chester, Crewe and Manchester continued in use up to and after nationalisation in January 1948, when they became part of the London Midland Region of British Railways (BR). BR withdrew passenger services from the Sandbach line and closed Middlewich station on 4 January 1960; thereafter the outer face of the southern island platform at the station fell out of use, though the branch itself has continued in use for freight traffic and periodic passenger diversions.

Services on the main Manchester to Chester route would continue but, from 1969, both terminals for this service would change following the closure of Manchester Central on 5 May and Chester Northgate on 6 October of that year. Trains henceforth ran to Manchester Oxford Road eastbound, and to the former GWR znd LNWR joint station at Chester General westbound. Since 1990 though, Manchester-bound trains have been diverted beyond Altrincham to run via Northenden and Stockport to reach Manchester Piccadilly, as the former route via Sale is now part of the Manchester Metrolink tram network.

In the December 2008 timetable, two additional weekday peak services to and from Stockport were added. On Sundays, a two-hourly service to Chester and Manchester was introduced, with the latter continuing to Southport, via Wigan Wallgate and Bolton. Prior to the new service, trains to Manchester had not operated on Sundays since the early 1990s. Passengers had to change at Altrincham onto the Metrolink to continue their journeys.

Services beyond Manchester were terminated in the May 2010 timetable change, with all but two current trains now terminating at Manchester Piccadilly. Additional weekday peak services to/from Stockport were suspended in 2020, but were later reinstated.

On 18 May 2021, a wall and part of the station roof collapsed onto the platform and track, causing disruption but no injuries. The cause was not immediately known. Part of the collapsed building was subsequently demolished and the station reopened two days later. In their 2022 Annual Health and Safety Report, the Office of Rail and Road identified the cause as growth of vegetation in and around the building.

== Facilities ==
The main buildings on the Manchester-bound platform are still in use, with the ticket office open six days per week from early morning until early afternoon (Monday-Friday 06:15-13:30, Saturdays 07:15-14:30). Two self-service ticket machines are also provided for use outside these times and for collecting advance purchase tickets. A waiting shelter is provided on the Chester-bound side (platform 2), whilst train running details are offered via CIS displays and timetable posters. Step-free access is only possible from the main entrance to platform 1, as platform 2 access is via a stepped footbridge.

The remaining parts of the building are used as a cafe and community centre.

== Services ==
Northern Trains operates one train per hour in each direction between Chester, Stockport and Manchester Piccadilly, with some peak hour extras between Chester and Stockport on weekdays. There is a two-hourly service on Sundays. Services are run by Class 150 and 156 diesel multiple units.

Preceding station	National Rail	Following station
Greenbank	Northern Trains; Mid-Cheshire Line	Lostock Gralam
	Historical railways	
Terminus	London and North Western Railway; Northwich to Sandbach Branch	Billinge Green Halt; Line open, station closed

== Proposed future developments ==
There have long been plans for a half-hourly service in each direction; it was a part of the 2015 franchise agreement, but this has been repeatedly delayed, due to capacity constraints between Stockport and Manchester, and is yet to be implemented.

Reinstating the passenger service between Northwich and Sandbach has been proposed. This would allow direct trains to Crewe from Knutsford, giving a better connection to the Midlands and the South of England.
