= West Cheshire Railway =

Railway line in Cheshire, England

The West Cheshire Railway (WCR) was an early railway company based in Cheshire, England.

== Early company history ==
West Cheshire Railways Act 1861
- Act of Parliament
- Parliament of the United Kingdom
- Long title: An Act for incorporating the West Cheshire Railway Company, and for authorizing them to make and maintain Railways from Northwich to Helsby; and for other Purposes.
- Citation: 24 & 25 Vict. c. cxliii

Dates
- Royal assent: 11 July 1861

West Cheshire Railways Act 1862
- Act of Parliament
- Parliament of the United Kingdom
- Long title: An Act for authorizing the West Cheshire Railway Company to make and maintain additional Lines of Railway and other Works, and to raise further Monies; and for other Purposes.
- Citation: 25 & 26 Vict. c. cxc

Dates
- Royal assent: 29 July 1862

Text of statute as originally enacted

The WCR was incorporated by the West Cheshire Railways Act 1861 (24 & 25 Vict. c. cxliii) on 11 July 1861. In 1861, the WCR requested powers to construct a line from Northwich to Chester, with a branch to Helsby, but parliamentary approval was received only for a line via Mouldsworth to Helsby. In 1862, the WCR again sought powers for their line to Chester, with connecting branches from Mouldsworth to Helsby and from Cuddington to Winsford. Again, parliamentary approval, given in the West Cheshire Railways Act 1862 (25 & 26 Vict. c. cxc), was restricted, being confined to the line to Helsby and a branch to Winsford.

== Construction and early operations ==
Following receipt of its statutory powers, the WCR commenced construction of its main 14.6-mile (23.5 km) line running west from the existing Cheshire Midland Railway at Northwich to join the Birkenhead Railway at Helsby Junction. On 15 August 1867, the WCR became a constituent of the Cheshire Lines Committee (CLC). Construction continued and the line from Northwich to Helsby opened for goods traffic on 1 September 1869 and for passenger trains on 22 June 1870. The public passenger service from Northwich to Helsby lasted only until 1 May 1875, but workmen's trains continued until 1944. From 1 May 1875, passenger trains from Northwich were re-routed south from Mouldsworth to operate along the newly opened line to Chester Northgate (see below).

A six-mile (9.7 km) branch line was built from Cuddington Junction to Winsford & Over railway station, which opened to goods traffic on 1 June 1870 and to passenger trains on 1 July 1870. A further short but important 1 mile 66 chains (2.9 km) branch line to Winnington, for goods traffic only, opened on 1 September 1869. This line, branching off the WCR route 1 mile 14 chains (1.9 km) south of Northwich Junction, primarily served the Brunner Mond chemical works.

== Route and stations ==
The WCR's main line left Northwich in a southwesterly direction and crossed the River Dane and the River Weaver by means of a one-half mile (800 m) long viaduct with forty-eight stone arches and two wrought-iron girder bridges. The first station out of Northwich was Hartford and Greenbank, renamed Greenbank on 7 May 1973. Further stations were located at Cuddington, Delamere, Mouldsworth, and Manley before the line's terminus at Helsby and Alvanley station. A goods station, engine shed and locomotive turntable were constructed between Helsby station and the junction with the Birkenhead Railway. Although the passenger service from Northwich to Helsby was terminated in 1875, the line from Mouldsworth to Helsby Junction continued in use until 14 September 1991 for freight trains heading for the Birkenhead Railway.

== Chester and West Cheshire Junction Railway ==
Chester and West Cheshire Junction Railway Act 1865
- Act of Parliament
- Parliament of the United Kingdom
- Long title: An Act for making and maintaining the Chester and West Cheshire Junction Railway; and for other Purposes.
- Citation: 28 & 29 Vict. c. ccxcii

Dates
- Royal assent: 5 July 1865

Text of statute as originally enacted

The Chester and West Cheshire Junction Railway Company was incorporated on 5 July 1865 by the Chester and West Cheshire Junction Railway Act 1865 (28 & 29 Vict. c. ccxcii) with the intention of seeking parliamentary approval for a railway linking the WCR's line at Mouldsworth Junction to a new station at Chester Northgate. It received authorisation and the company and its powers were transferred to the CLC on 10 August 1866.

Construction of the 7-mile-35-chain (12.0 km) line began in 1871 and it opened for freight trains on 2 November 1874. Chester Northgate was completed on 1 May 1875, when passenger trains from Manchester and Northwich commenced running to the new station.

== See also ==
- Winsford and Over Branch Line
