= Knutsford railway station =

Railway station in Cheshire, England

Coordinates: 53°18′07″N 2°22′18″W

Knutsford
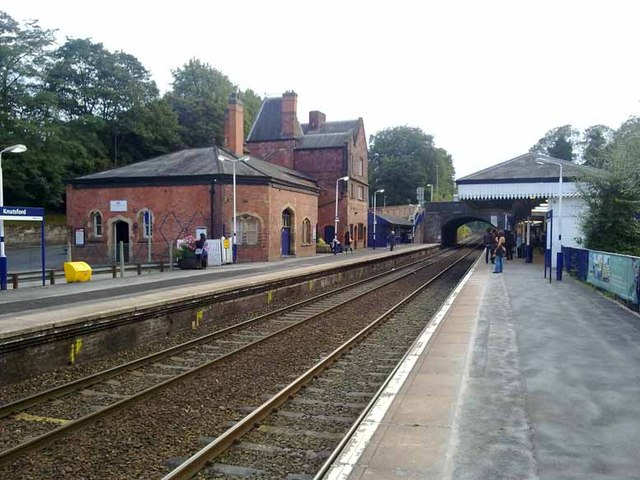
- Knutsford station in 2011

General information
- Location: Knutsford, Cheshire East, England
- Grid reference: SJ752783
- Manager: Northern Trains
- Platforms: 2

Other information
- Station code: KNF
- Classification: DfT category D

History
- Opened: 1862

Passengers
- 2020/21: ▼0.121 million
- 2021/22: ▲0.273 million
- 2022/23: ▲0.322 million
- 2023/24: ▲0.338 million
- 2024/25: ▲0.371 million
Location
Notes
- Passenger statistics from the Office of Rail and Road

Knutsford railway station serves the town of Knutsford, in Cheshire, England. It lies 21 3/4 miles (35.0 km) south of Manchester Piccadilly on the Mid-Cheshire Line to Chester.

== History ==
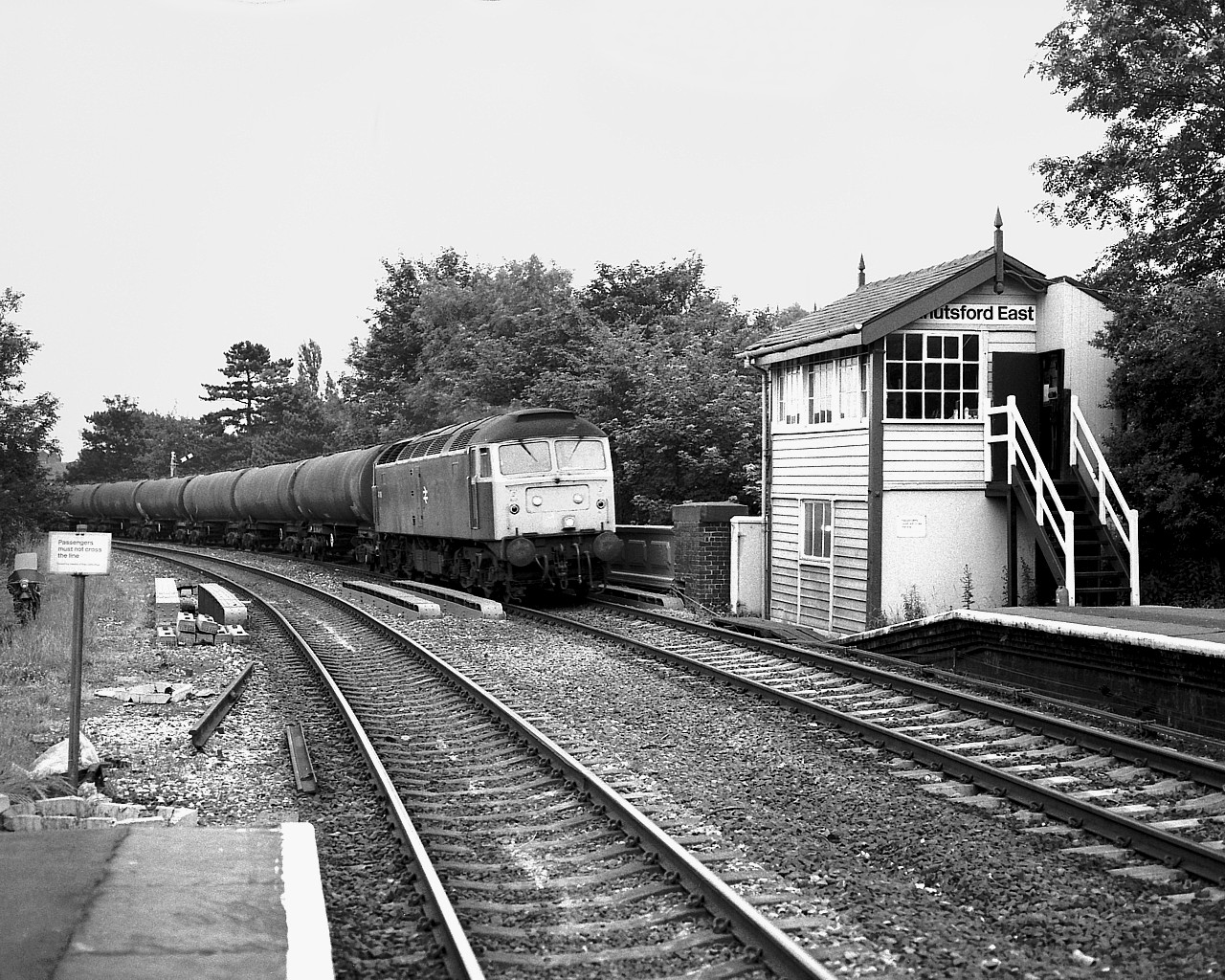
A goods train passing through Knutsford, with the old (now removed) signal box at the north end of platform 2

The station opened to passengers on 12 May 1862, with a service to Altrincham. Trains to Northwich commenced from 1 January 1863. Services were operated by the Cheshire Lines Committee until nationalisation on 1 January 1948.

The station was built by Cheshire Lines Railway, on the site of the farm mentioned in Elizabeth Gaskell's novel Cranford, where the cow fell into a lime-pit. The goods yard was originally on the south-east side of the track, above the huge brick retaining wall, which ever after became a home for large posters. It was later resited to the north and the original site became the station master's garden; Knutsford often won the competition for the best.

In April 1916, there was an Easter Rising in Ireland, where rebels hoped to form an independent country free from British rule. At least 600 rebels involved in that rising were transported by train from Holyhead and imprisoned in Knutsford Gaol.

As part of Northern Trains' December 2022 timetable, which focused on additional services within the Manchester area, an additional four trains per day between Chester and Stockport (two in each direction) were introduced during peak hours on Mondays to Saturdays. These services are aimed at those who are commuting to and/or working in Stockport and south Manchester.

== Facilities ==
The station has a ticket office and parking with 45 spaces (with three accessible), but no taxi rank or drop off/pick up point. A ticket vending machine is in place for purchase of tickets, when the ticket office is closed and for the collection of pre-paid tickets. Live passenger information screens are installed on both platforms. Both platforms are step-free.

Buses call at Adams Hill, adjacent to the car park next to the Chester-bound platform.

On the Chester-bound platform is a Bike & Go bike hire facility, similar in nature to London's Santander Cycles.

Knutsford station has had a relatively large amount of crime in previous years. CCTV cameras are now installed at the station.

== Services ==
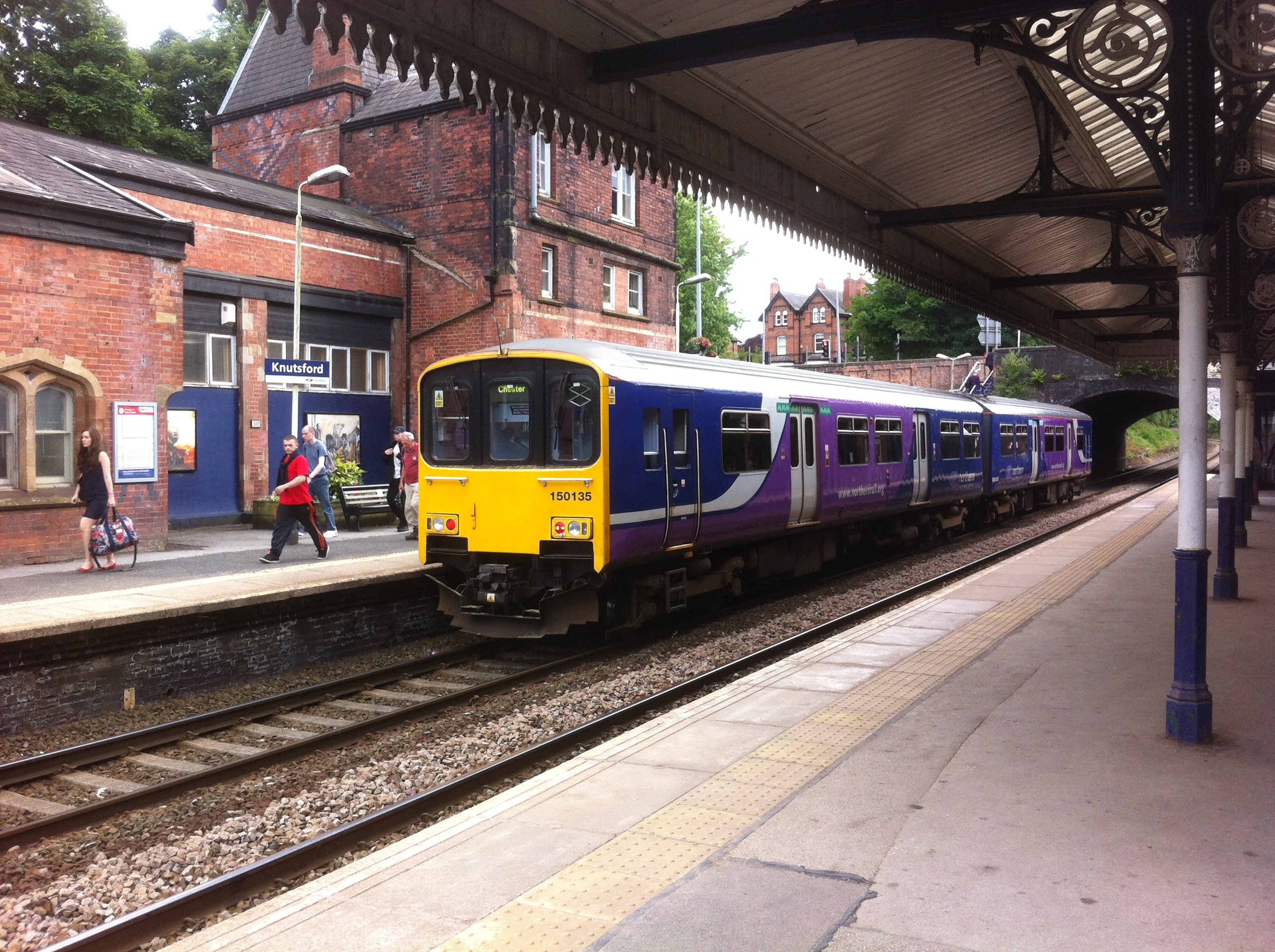
Knutsford station, as seen from platform 1 (2015)

Northern Trains operates a generally hourly service between Manchester Piccadilly, Stockport, Altrincham, Northwich and Chester, with extra trains to/from Stockport at peak times. There is a two-hourly service on Sundays. The average journey time to and from Manchester in the current timetable is around 45 minutes.

Preceding station	National Rail	Following station
Plumley	Northern Trains; Mid-Cheshire Line	Mobberley

== Future proposals ==
Reopening the line between Northwich and Sandbach has been proposed. This will allow direct trains to Crewe from Knutsford, giving a better connection to the Midlands and the South of England.

Proposals for a direct link to Manchester Airport from Knutsford were first put forward in the 1990s, not much had seemed to materialise from this. However, in 2009, Network Rail stated that the creation of the third platform has meant that the capacity at Manchester Airport will become constrained by the layover of the trains and congestion at the throat. To solve this issue, it recommended building a line underneath the airport towards Northwich in the 2019 to 2024 period.

The running of tram-trains directly into Manchester via Sale has been investigated. In 2013, TfGM said that running tram-trains to Knutsford would provide poor value for money and that alternative heavy rail options should be looked at instead.
