= Mid-Cheshire line =

Railway line in north-west England

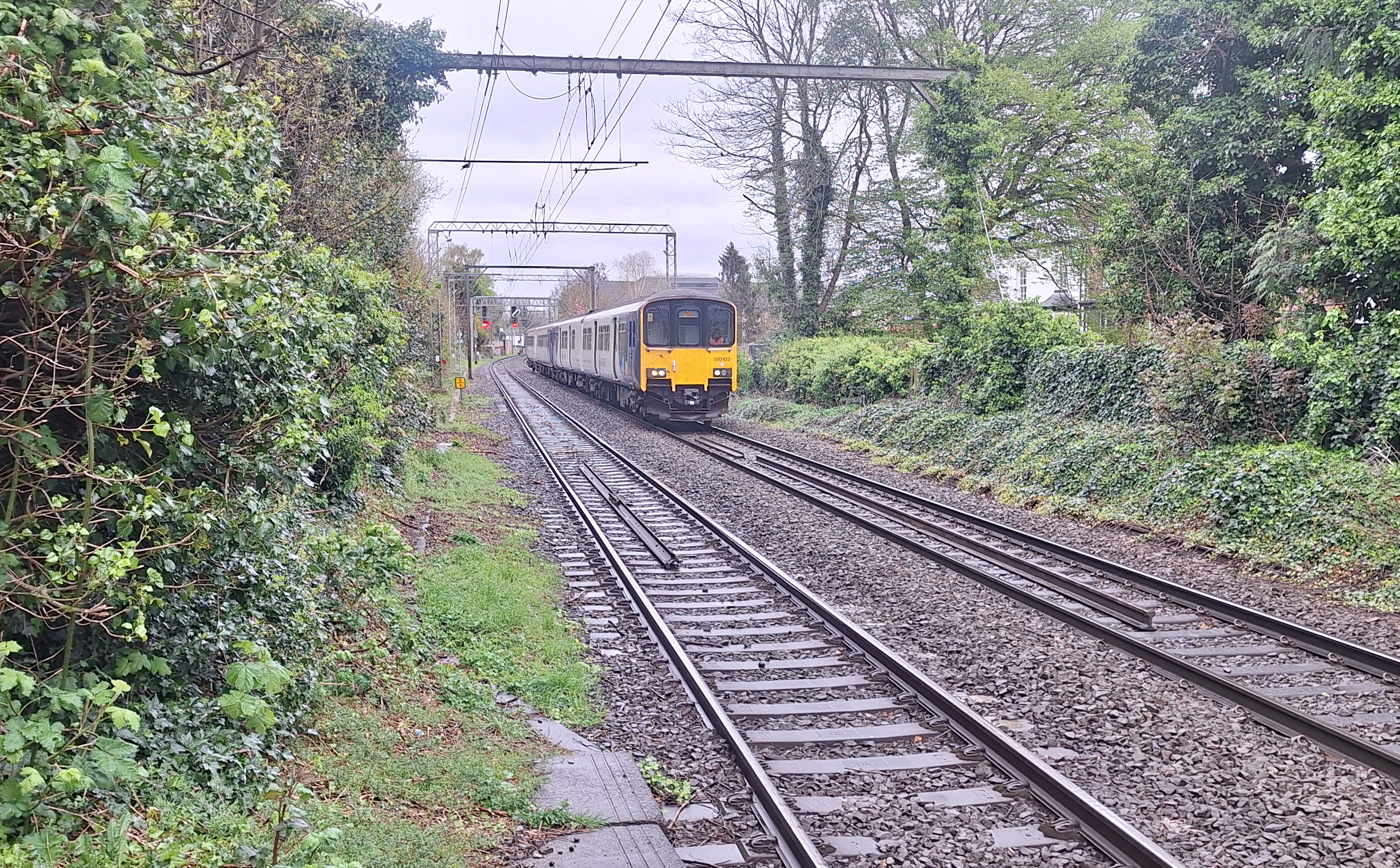
- A train formed of Classes 150 and 156 approaching Navigation Road, April 2025.

Overview
- Status: Operational
- Owner: Network Rail
- Locale: Cheshire, Greater Manchester
- Termini: Chester, Manchester Piccadilly

Service
- System: National Rail
- Operator: Northern Trains
- Depot: Longsight
- Rolling stock: Class 150, Class 156

Technical
- Track gauge: 1,435 mm (4 ft 8 1/2 in) standard gauge
Route map
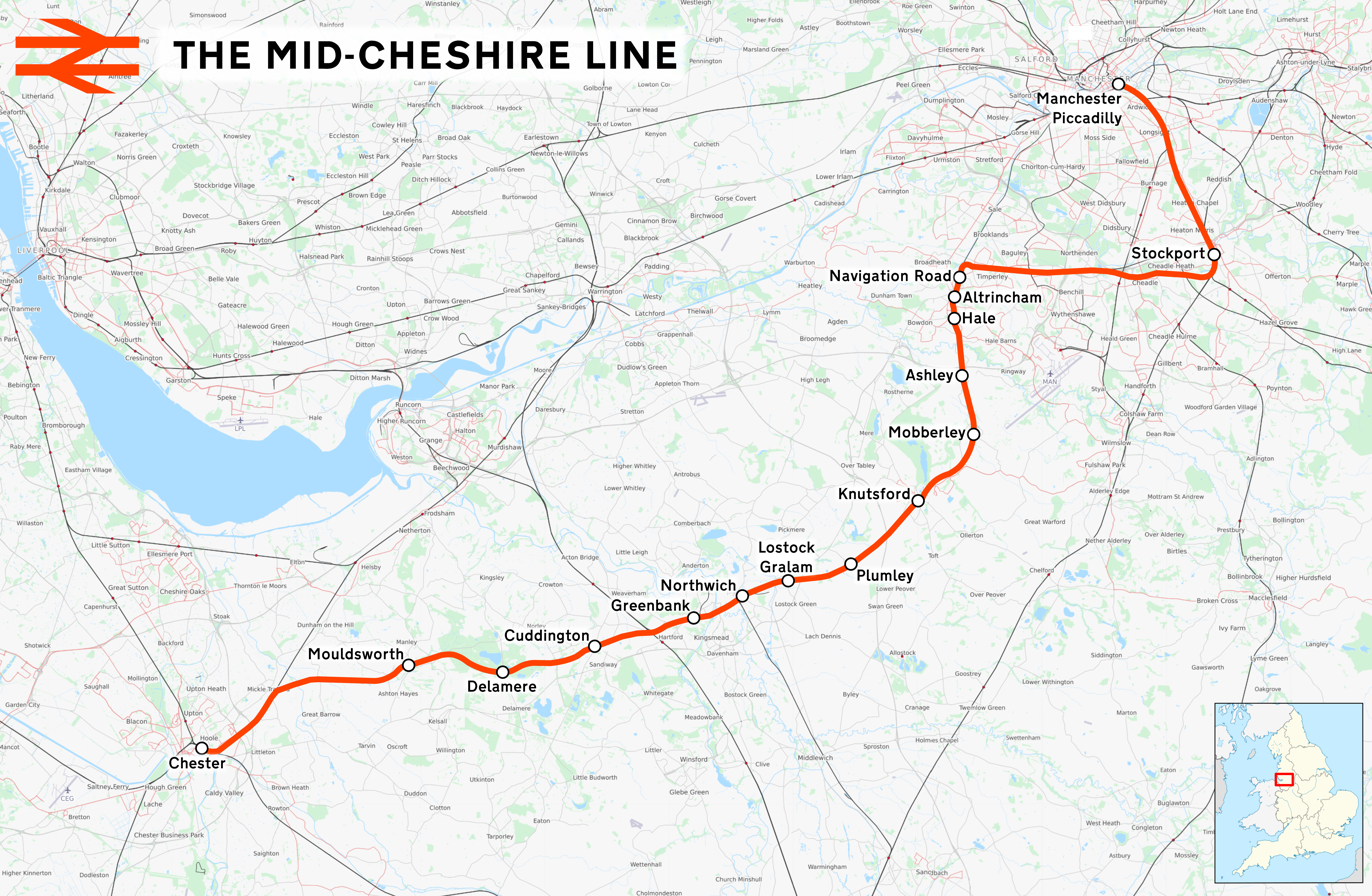
(Click to expand)

The Mid-Cheshire line is a railway line in the north-west of England that runs from Chester to Edgeley Junction in Stockport; it connects Chester with Manchester Piccadilly, via Knutsford. After Chester Northgate closed in 1969, the section between Mickle Trafford Junction and Chester was used for freight trains only until it closed in 1992; from Mickle Trafford, passenger trains use the Chester–Warrington line to Chester General instead. The route taken by passenger trains has changed over the years and now differs considerably from the original. Between 2001 and 2014, passenger journeys on the line increased to over 1.7 million per year. A near doubling of the passenger service was expected to occur from December 2018, however this did not materialise.

== History ==
=== Altrincham to Chester ===
The Mid-Cheshire line has its origins in railways promoted by three separate railway companies in the 19th century. The Cheshire Midland Railway was opened to passengers between Altrincham and Knutsford on 12 May 1862, then completed to Northwich on 1 January 1863. The West Cheshire Railway opened from Northwich to West Cheshire Junction in 1869. This railway was extended from Mouldsworth to a new terminus at Chester Northgate in 1874.

The line from Altrincham to Manchester was the Manchester, South Junction and Altrincham Railway (MSJAR), opened on 20 July 1849 and jointly owned by the London and North Western Railway and the Manchester, Sheffield and Lincolnshire Railway (MSLR, later the Great Central Railway). The line from Chester to Altrincham was vested in the Cheshire Lines Committee (CLC), a joint committee regulated by the Great Northern Railway (GNR), MSLR and the Midland Railway (MR). This committee became an independent company after 1867 and survived the 1923 Grouping intact.

Services were operated by the CLC until nationalisation on 1 January 1948, when the line became part of British Railways London Midland Region. Between 1880 and 1969, CLC trains from Chester via Altrincham terminated at Manchester Central.

The junction with the Sandbach branch became a triangular junction in 1957, with the addition of the single-line connection from Sandbach towards Chester.

Before the Beeching closures in the 1960s, there were branch lines with services from the Mid-Cheshire line (see also the Winsford and Over branch). Beeching had no plans to close part or all of the Mid-Cheshire line, although in his proposed second phase of closures there were plans to close the line between Chester and Warrington Bank Quay, which would have increased the number of passengers using the Mid-Cheshire line. Although those proposed closures never went ahead, the original termini at Chester and Manchester were closed in 1969 and services were re-routed to Chester General, via a new junction at Mickle Trafford, and Manchester Oxford Road.

The route was double tracked between Chester and Altrincham, although the section between Mickle Trafford and Mouldsworth was reduced to single track after Chester Northgate station closed in 1969. For many years, the line had the reputation of being one of the busiest double-track routes in the UK.

=== Manchester to Altrincham ===
CLC trains from Manchester to Chester departed from Manchester Central and joined the MSJ&A tracks at Old Trafford, sharing the MSJ&A line as far as Altrincham. These trains usually ran "express", some non-stop, with others calling only at Sale. The frequency of trains over this section led to a large section of the MSJ&A route between Manchester and Altrincham being quadrupled, and the whole route (from Manchester to the former Bowdon railway station, which was used as carriage sidings and repair depot) was electrified at 1500 volts DC in 1931. Local services between Manchester London Road and Altrincham were then provided by electric multiple unit trains. From 1960, Manchester Oxford Road became the terminus for the Altrincham electrics and through running from London Road (renamed Piccadilly in that year) ceased. The journey time by the electric trains from Oxford Road to Altrincham was typically 20 or 21 minutes. The CLC trains typically took 13 minutes to travel between Manchester Central (Oxford Road from 1969) and Altrincham with one stop at Sale.

The original Class 505 electric multiple units, built in 1931, were withdrawn in 1971 and the system was changed to 25 kV AC. Through running to Manchester Piccadilly was reintroduced and some services from Altrincham to Manchester were extended through Manchester to Alderley Edge/Crewe/Stoke-on-Trent and occasionally Wolverhampton. Services were provided by AM4 (later Class 304) electric multiple units. Unlike the 1931-built trains, these had not been designed specifically for the Altrincham route and they lacked the acceleration of the older trains, causing the journey time from Manchester to Altrincham to be extended by 3 minutes.

Further changes in 1990 saw Mid-Cheshire line trains diverted via Stockport, in preparation for conversion of the Sale route to Metrolink. The electrification system between Manchester and Altrincham was changed for the second time, to 750 V DC, and the electric trains replaced by trams. The journey time by tram to Altrincham was 27 minutes and the faster diesel service (the Mid-Cheshire line trains) ceased as these trains were diverted via Stockport with considerably extended journey times. The journey time by train from Manchester to Hale, for example, doubled from 17 to 34 minutes. Manchester Metrolink trams now exclusively use the trackbed between Deansgate Junction (between Navigation Road and Timperley) and Manchester.

== Present route ==
The line serves many small, rural settlements in Cheshire before reaching Chester. Services follow the Crewe line from Manchester Piccadilly as far as Stockport, where the line diverges westwards. The line then curves around the south of Manchester until it meets the Metrolink line. Metrolink and main line services run parallel between Deansgate Junction through Navigation Road to Altrincham, where the Metrolink terminates. Part of the route is single track between Stockport and Altrincham. South of Altrincham, the route leaves Manchester's suburbs. There are no further passenger interchanges on the line until the service reaches Chester. There is a single-tracked freight-only branch to the west of Northwich which links Northwich to Sandbach on the Crewe to Manchester Line. There is a campaign for this line to be reopened as a passenger line to allow interchange with services at Sandbach or Crewe and serve the town of Middlewich, the railway station of which closed in 1960. There is also a curve to access the West Coast Main Line further west, but passenger services do not use this. The line joins up with the line from Chester to Warrington just east of Chester at Mickle Trafford Junction.

As part of the (then) new Northern franchise, which commenced in April 2016, the new operator Arriva was required to run the existing service, as well as an additional service every hour on weekdays and Saturdays between Greenbank and Manchester. One service was required by the terms of the invitation to tender to run semi-fast and must call at Stockport, Altrincham, Knutsford and Northwich only, between Greenbank and Manchester in both directions. The announcement of Arriva as the franchise winner in December 2015 indicated that the future operator has gained agreement for the additional service to call at Hale although this was not specified in the invitation to tender. Services on Sunday from Chester to Manchester were planned to become every hour in each direction.

The franchise agreement also required the removal and replacement of all Class 142 Pacer trains by 2019; however, it was not until 2020 that all Class 142s were retired.

== Current services ==
The general service pattern on the Mid-Cheshire Line is:

Monday to Friday:

- Manchester to Chester: 18 trains per day
- Stockport to Chester: 2 trains per day
- Chester to Manchester: 18 trains per day
- Chester to Stockport: 2 trains per day.

Saturday:

- Manchester to Chester: 18 trains per day
- Chester to Manchester: 18 trains per day.

Sunday:

- Chester to Manchester: 7 trains
- Manchester to Chester: 7 trains.

The above shows a cutback in the number of peak services to and from Manchester, which started in December 2008 and prompted an on-line petition. It also included the loss of a daily direct service to Blackpool North from Northwich and the loss of a limited stop afternoon train from Chester to Manchester; there were also improvements made to the Sunday service, which was previously a three-hourly Chester to Altrincham service. Due to growing numbers of passengers, the new Northern franchise planned to include increased services.

Passenger numbers for the Mid-Cheshire line show that the station on the line with the highest number of people boarding and alighting Manchester to Chester via Altrincham services is Manchester Piccadilly. The second highest, and the highest station served only by this line, is Knutsford, followed by Stockport, Chester, and Altrincham respectively. Ashley contributes the fewest passengers to the service.

Passenger services in the off-peak period are better utilised than passenger services on similar lines, with Altrincham being in the top ten busiest Greater Manchester stations (excluding central Manchester stations) for the morning off-peak period; Hale and Altrincham also both perform well in the morning peak period.

== Future services ==
The following are proposals for future services to the line:

=== Additional services between Chester and Stockport ===
As part of Northern Trains' proposed December 2022 timetable (which focused on additional services within the Manchester area), an additional four trains per day between Chester and Stockport (two in each direction) were proposed during peak hours on Mondays to Saturdays. These services were aimed at those who are commuting to and/or working in Manchester and Stockport. This change would have increase the number of trains departing Chester on the line to 20 per day, with the number departing Stockport also increased to 20 per day. The two-hourly Sunday service would have remained the same, at seven trains per day.

=== Reopening the Northwich to Sandbach line to passenger trains ===
This would allow a direct train service from stations along the line to access Crewe, without the need to change at Chester, which will should reduce journey times to destinations south of Chester, as well as reducing fares to those destinations. It would also allow the former station at Middlewich to reopen, and the possibility of a new station opening at Rudheath. An independent feasibility report found the benefit-to-cost ratio for the reopening to be 5:1, which is almost four times higher than the recently reopened Borders railway in Scotland.

=== Manchester Airport western link ===
Proposals for a link to Manchester Airport from near Mobberley were first put forward in the 1990s, though little progress was made. However, in March 2009 it was mentioned in a Network Rail document as a possible project in the future, although reopening the Northwich to Sandbach line to regular passenger services was not mentioned in that document. The link to Manchester Airport would be a 3.5 mile new railway, starting north of Mobberley and continuing under the airport campus in tunnel, before making an end-on junction with the southernmost platforms of the existing airport station, which was designed with this extension in mind.

As well as providing links from mid-Cheshire and Chester to Manchester Airport, the new line would enable services from North Wales, Liverpool and the Wirral to reach the airport by shorter routes than today. The route from Chester and North Wales, in particular, would cut off more than 20 miles from today's route via Warrington and Manchester.

=== Manchester Piccadilly via Styal Line ===
Additionally, by running services from Cheshire through the airport, these could hypothetically continue through to Manchester Piccadilly via the Styal Line. Such a route would cut more than 5 miles off the current Stockport route and would restore journey times between Cheshire and Manchester to the times achieved before 1990, when the Sale route was transferred to Manchester Metrolink. However, the Styal Line route between the Airport and Manchester Piccadilly has become one of the most congested routes on the national rail network, with commuter stations on the line now operating on a skip-stop basis since the May 2018 timetable and no spare capacity left.

=== Running tram-trains directly to Manchester ===
The possibility of running tram-trains between Greenbank or Knutsford and central Manchester has been examined.

=== Electrification ===
In March 2015, the Electrification Task Force said that the Mid-Cheshire line was a tier 1 priority for being electrified in the CP6 period (2019-2024). However, coming into 2026 this has not been started.

=== New station at Cheadle ===
Stockport Council has proposed a new single-platform station at Cheadle, to be supported by the Towns Fund.

== Motive power and rolling stock ==
=== History ===
The CLC owned its own coaching stock but no locomotives (apart from four Sentinel steam railmotors). From the start of operations, motive power was provided by the MSLR and later the GCR, although locomotives and stock from the other CLC constituent companies could also be seen. This gave the Mid-Cheshire line a very cosmopolitan feel until well into the 1960s when older locomotives were replaced by British Railways (BR) standard designs.

Early passenger services were handled by MSLR/GCR class 12A (LNER class E3) 2-4-0 locomotives designed by Charles Sacre. These were replaced by John Robinson-built GCR class 11B (LNER class D9) 4-4-0, GCR class 11E (LNER class D10) 4-4-0 'Small Directors', GCR class 11F (LNER class D11) 4-4-0 'Large Directors' and GCR class 9K (LNER class C13) 4-4-2 tank locomotives. The 'Directors' and C13s lasted well into the nationalisation era and were eventually displaced by LMS and BR standard tank engines. Dieselisation of passenger services began in the early 1960s with Class 108 and later Class 101 diesel multiple units displacing the steam locomotives.

The route was a very busy freight artery – especially the section between Greenbank and Deansgate Junction. The ICI works at Winnington and Lostock attracted much traffic, in particular heavy trains consisting of custom-built bogie hoppers, which carried limestone from Derbyshire. These trains required banking between Northwich and Winnington works and were the preserve of LMS Class 8F 2-8-0 locomotives, later BR Class 40, Class 47 and Class 20 diesels. Other locomotives to be seen included LMS Class 4F, GCR class 8K (LNER Class O4) and Class 9D (LNER Class J10) steam locomotives. Shunting and trip working was carried out by GCR Class 9F (LNER Class N5) steam and BR Class 08 diesel locomotives.

=== Recent history ===
Until the early 2020s, Class 142, Class 158 and Class 175s were used on some journeys on this line. Class 175s have not been used on services on this line since Northern Rail took over the franchise; the small fleet of Manchester-based Class 158s, which were used on the line until 2005, were transferred to Leeds to work services in the Yorkshire and North East areas. Class 175s occasionally travelled along the line when engineering work was taking place on the Chester to Manchester via Warrington line.

=== The present ===
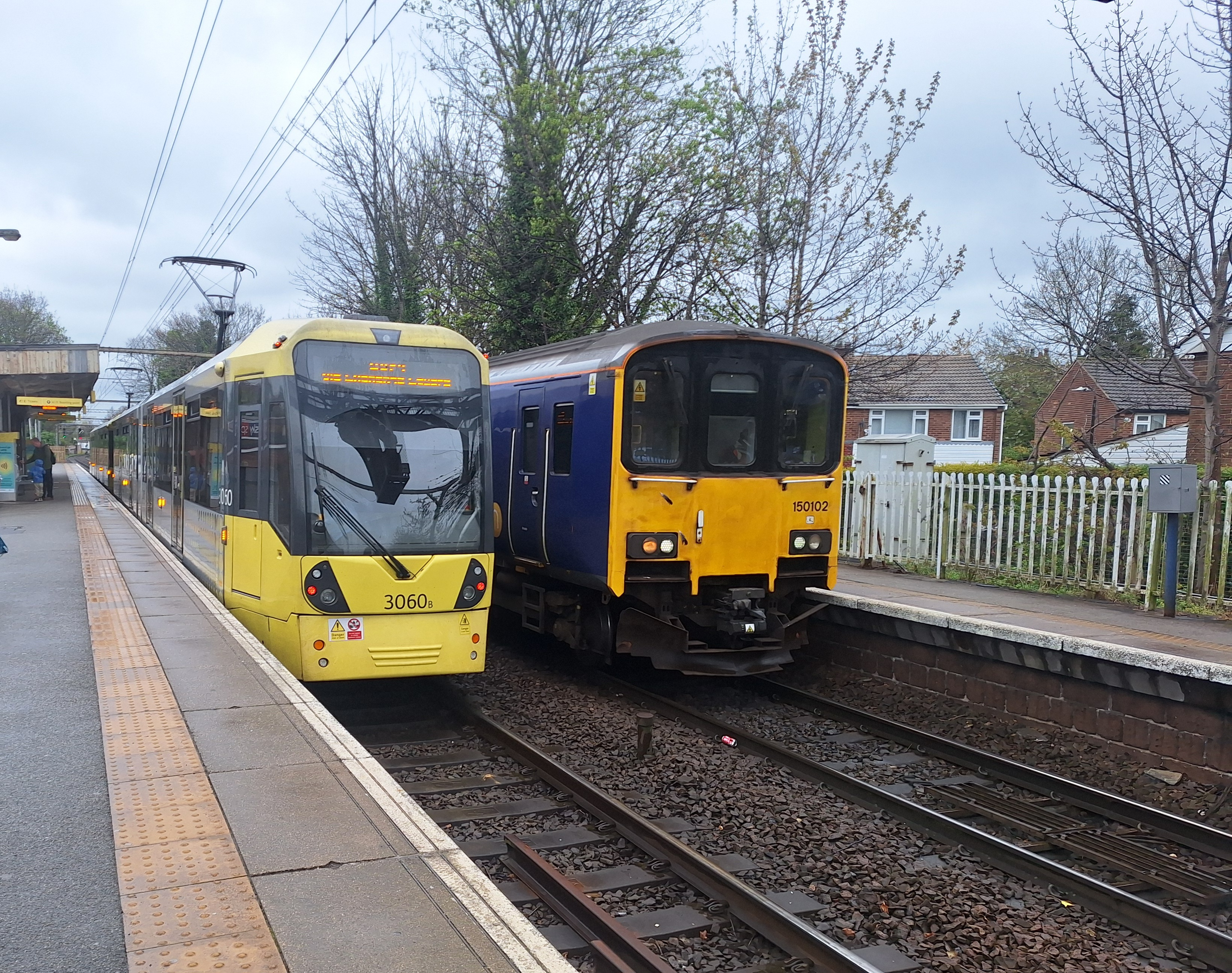
A Manchester Metrolink Bombardier M5000 and a Northern Trains Class 150 at Navigation Road, April 2025

The line sees a mix of diesel traction. Many of the passenger trains used on this line are Class 150s and Class 156s.

Goods trains continue to use the line. The primary source of traffic for many years was limestone from quarries near Buxton, in Derbyshire, to Brunner Mond's works at Winnington. This decreased sharply in 2014 when the works was closed by Tata Chemicals Europe. Since then, the majority of freight runs to and from the ICI plant and refuse incinerator at Folly Lane near Runcorn to destinations in and around Manchester (including one on the route itself at Northenden) using the Greenbank to Hartford spur line to enter or leave the route. Some limestone traffic from Buxton to the former ICI terminal near Lostock Gralam (serving Tata's other chemical plant in the area) continues to run.
