= Sandbach railway station =

Railway station in Cheshire, England

Coordinates: 53.150°N 2.394°W

Sandbach
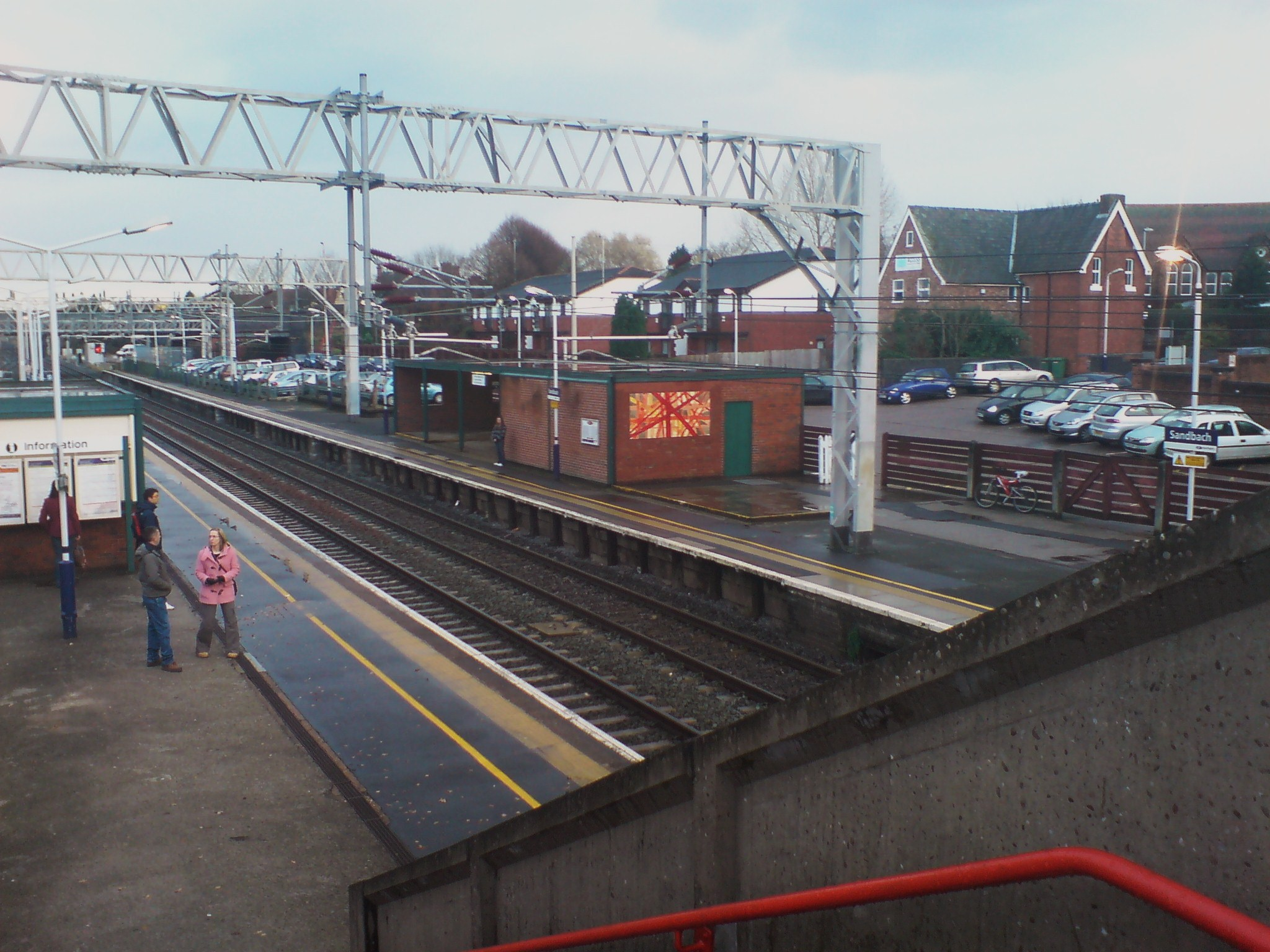
- View of platforms 1 and 2 from the old bridge in December 2007, which was recently replaced

General information
- Location: Elworth and Sandbach, Cheshire East; England
- Grid reference: SJ737615
- Manager: Northern Trains
- Platforms: 3

Other information
- Station code: SDB
- Classification: DfT category E

Key dates
- 10 May 1842: Opened
- 1998: Refurbished

Passengers
- 2021/22: ▲0.193 million
- 2022/23: ▲0.231 million
- 2023/24: ▲0.261 million
- 2024/25: ▲0.295 million
- 2025/26: ▲0.313 million
Location
Notes
- Passenger statistics from the Office of Rail and Road

Sandbach railway station serves the village of Elworth and market town of Sandbach in Cheshire, England. The station is 4 3/4 miles (8 km) north-east of Crewe, on the Crewe to Manchester Line. Although the station is named Sandbach, it is in the local residential village of Elworth on the A533 road, which links the town with Middlewich and Northwich.

== History ==
Sandbach railway station opened in 1842 on the Manchester and Birmingham Railway. It later became a double junction on the LNWR and later London Midland and Scottish Railway line from Crewe to Manchester.

For many years, Sandbach was a junction for the single line branch to Middlewich and Northwich; it opened on 1 July 1868, and closed for passenger service in January 1960, but it still carries freight on a daily basis.

Earlier, the North Staffordshire Railway branch from Kidsgrove to Sandbach, via Lawton Junction, ceased passenger service in July 1930 and closed to freight traffic in 1964.

In 1998, the station underwent a £750,000 refurbishment by North Western Trains.

== Facilities ==
The station has a ticket office on platform 1; this is staffed part-time on Mondays to Saturdays only (Monday - Friday 06:30 - 13:00, Saturday 07:20 - 13:50). Outside these times, tickets must be purchased prior to travel, on-line or on board the train.

A waiting room on platform 1 is open at the times the station is staffed, whilst there are shelters on both sides. Train running details are offered via timetable posters, digital CIS displays and by telephone. No step-free access is available, as the footbridge to platforms 2 and 3 does not have ramps and the Crewe platform has steps from the car park.

The station has three platforms:

- Platform 1 for southbound trains to Crewe.
- Platform 2 for northbound services to Manchester Piccadilly
- Platform 3 is bidirectional, which used on weekday mornings and as required.

== Services ==
During the daytime on Mondays to Saturdays, there are two trains per hour in each direction between Crewe and Manchester Piccadilly:

- One via Stockport, calling at all intermediate stations
- One along the Styal line via Manchester Airport, omitting some stops.

On evenings and Sundays, there is an hourly service in each direction between Crewe and Manchester Piccadilly, via Stockport.

All stopping services are operated by Northern Trains.

Preceding station	National Rail	Following station
Crewe	Northern Trains; Crewe-Manchester Line	Holmes Chapel
	Historical railways	
Cledford Bridge Halt	London and North Western Railway; Northwich to Sandbach Branch	Terminus
