= List of works by F. X. Velarde =

Francis Xavier Velarde (1897–1961) was an English architect who practised in Liverpool, Merseyside, England. He trained at the Liverpool School of Architecture where he later taught. His works are mainly in Merseyside and Northwest England, with the major part of his body of output being Catholic churches. Although Pollard and Pevsner state that he "worked exclusively for the Roman Catholic Church", he did design one Anglican church, St Gabriel's Church, Blackburn. Velarde also designed Roman Catholic schools. This list includes some of his major works.

== Key ==
Grade	Criteria
Grade I	Buildings of exceptional interest, sometimes considered to be internationally important.
Grade II*	Particularly important buildings of more than special interest.
Grade II	Buildings of national importance and special interest.

== Works ==
Name	Location	Photograph	Date	Notes	Grade
St Matthew's Church	Clubmoor, Liverpool, Merseyside; 53.4367°N 2.9337°W		1930	This was Velarde's first church; it is built in brick with a green pantiled roof. The church has a tall northeast tower with a copper cupola. The internal furnishings are also by Velarde.	II
St Gabriel's Church, Blackburn	Blackburn, Lancashire; 53.7745°N 2.4770°W		1932–33	St Gabriel's is considered to be a milestone in the development of the Modern Movement in church architecture. It is built in brick, with a truncated tower. The former flat roofs have been replaced by pitched roofs because of leaking. The doors have Art Deco decoration in painted metal. Unusually for Velarde, it is an Anglican church.	—
St Monica's Church	Bootle, Sefton, Merseyside; 53.4539°N 2.9798°W		1935–36	Inspired by the Continental churches of Dominikus Böhm, St Monica's is constructed in fawn-coloured brick with a green pantile roof. It has a wide west tower incorporating a narthex, with tall thin sculptures of angels on the west front by H. Tyson Smith. The church was upgraded to Grade I listed status in 2017.	I
Our Lady of Lourdes School	Birkdale, Southport, Sefton, Merseyside; 53.6208°N 3.0104°W	—	1935–36	With a design modern for its time, the school is built in brick with much glass, including a glazed semicircular staircase, and long bands of windows. The windows have stone mullions carved with saints.	—
Our Lady of Pity's Church	Greasby, Wirral, Merseyside; 53.3757°N 3.1239°W		1952	The church is in brick and has a southwest tower with a pyramidal copper roof. The windows are lancets with fluted mullions. The church forms a three-sided courtyard with the presbytery and hall.	—
English Martyrs' Church	Wallasey, Wirral, Merseyside; 53.4243°N 3.0635°W		1952–53	Plans for the church were prepared before the Second World War. It has an almost detached southeast tower, with a sculpture of the Pietà, square bell openings, and a copper roof. The mullions in the windows consist of concrete figures, and the rose window contains a sculpture of Christ.	II*
St Gabriel's Church	Alsager, Cheshire; 53.0979°N 2.2938°W		1953	This is a long, low, plain church in brick with side buttresses separating groups of round-headed windows. The windows have mullions in the form of angels with doves.	—
St Benedict's Church	Hindley, Greater Manchester; 53.5347°N 2.5787°W		1954	Velarde added a Lady chapel to a church built in 1869 and designed by Joseph Hansom. The chapel consists of a circular room with a conical roof, joined to the south aisle of the church.	—
Church of St Cuthbert by the Forest	Mouldsworth, Cheshire; 53.2304°N 2.7331°W		1955	St Cuthbert's is a small church in brick. It has a detached tower (not part of the original design) with a pyramidal spire, and loudspeakers visible in its belfry. At the west end is an apse, and at the other end is a double-gabled narthex topped by a cross commemorating the church's Golden Jubilee.	II
Shrine of Our Lady of Lourdes	Blackpool, Lancashire; 53.8229°N 3.0165°W	A grey-white stone chapel seen from the northwest, with a central spirelet with a cross. There is an elaborate carving of the Crucifixion over the west door, a tall pinnacle at the corner, and elaborate stone tracery in the windows along the side	1955–57	The shrine was built by public subscription as a thanksgiving for the relatively small amount of damage sustained by the Roman Catholic Diocese of Lancaster during the Second World War. It is constructed in Portland stone with copper cladding to its roof and flèche. In the ownership of Historic Chapels Trust since 2002 the shrine is being restored for secular uses.	II*
St Teresa's Church	Upholland, Lancashire; 53.5492°N 2.7278°W		1955–57	The design was influenced by early Spanish churches. It is constructed in brick with stone dressings and tiled roofs. The church has a single aisle, and a detached northeast tower. There is sculpture by H. Tyson Smith inside and outside the church.	II
St Winefrede's Church	Monkmoor, Shrewsbury, Shropshire; 52.7108°N 2.7242°W		1956	This is a small brick church, with an apse and a square tower.	—
St Luke's Church	Pinner, London; 51.5953°N 0.3829°W		1957–58	Built in brick in a neo-Romanesque version of the continental modern style.	II
Holy Cross Church	Bidston, Birkenhead, Merseyside; 53.4024°N 3.0672°W		1957–59	Combining Romanesque and modern motifs, the church is built in brick and stone, and has tiled roofs. It has a southwest tower with five round-headed bell openings on each side and a copper-covered pyramidal roof. There is also a baptistry with a circular lantern, and a Lady chapel with an apsidal end. The church is no longer in active use.	II
Our Lady of Pity's Church	Harlescott, Shrewsbury, Shropshire; 52.7293°N 2.7212°W		1961	This is a small brick church, with an apse and a polygonal tower.	—
Church of St Vincent de Paul and St Louise of Marillac	Potters Bar, Hertfordshire; 51.6898°N 0.1756°W		1962	The church was completed and opened in 1962, after Velarde's death, but the foundation stone was laid in July 1960. It replaced a church dedicated to St Francis Xavier which had been destroyed by World War II bombing. In 2005, the two parishes in the town were combined and a new church was built on the site of the 1950s building which served the other parish; Velarde's church was no longer required, and it closed in December 2005 and was demolished for residential development.	—
