= List of churches in Blackpool =

The following is a list of churches in Blackpool, Lancashire.

== List ==
- Christ Church Blackpool
- Bispham Parish Church
- Church of St Stephen on-the-Cliffs, Blackpool
- St Thomas' Church, Blackpool
- Holy Trinity Church, Blackpool
- Sacred Heart Church, Blackpool
- Shrine of Our Lady of Lourdes, Blackpool
- St John's Church, Blackpool
- St Mark's Church, Blackpool
- Victory Biker Church, Blackpool
