= Horton-cum-Peel =

Former civil parish in Cheshire, England

Coordinates: 53.222°N 2.751°W

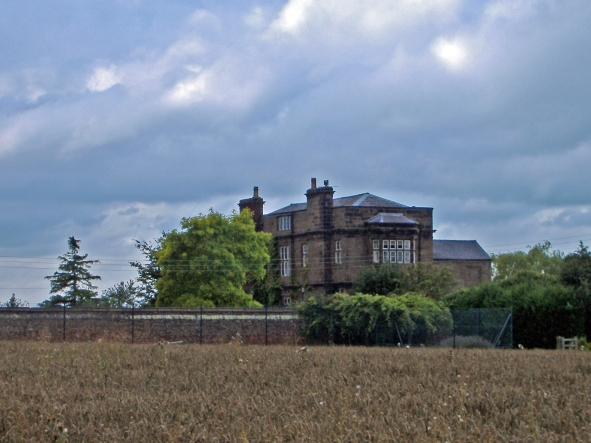
- Peel Hall

- Location within Cheshire
- Population: 15 (2001)
- OS grid reference: SJ4998
- Civil parish: Ashton Hayes and Horton-cum-Peel
- Unitary authority: Cheshire West and Chester
- Ceremonial county: Cheshire
- Region: North West
- Country: England
- Sovereign state: United Kingdom
- Post town: CHESTER
- Postcode district: CH3
- Dialling code: 01829
- Police: Cheshire
- Fire: Cheshire
- Ambulance: North West
- UK Parliament: Runcorn and Helsby

Horton-cum-Peel is a former civil parish, now in the parish of Ashton Hayes and Horton-cum-Peel, in the borough of Cheshire West and Chester and ceremonial county of Cheshire in England. In 2001 it had a population of 15. The parish included Peel Hall though due to an error in Chester City Council's electoral register in 1993, three houses had been able to vote in parish council elections in Ashton Hayes opposed to Horton-cum-Peel where they were located. This error was later corrected in 2006. Horton Cum Peel was formerly a township, in 1866 Horton Cum Peel became a civil parish, on 1 April 2015 the parish was abolished to form "Ashton Hayes and Horton-cum-Peel".

== Peel Hall ==
Peel Hall was built by Henry Hardware IV, a descendant of the former Lord Mayor of Chester Henry Hardware, as a three-storey manor house. In 1690 it was the location a visit by King William III of England hosted by Colonel Roger Whitley while the king was travelling en route to the Kingdom of Ireland to fight in the Battle of the Boyne. Ownership later fell into the hands of the Earls of Plymouth.

By the 1800s, the manor house had been transformed into a farmhouse with the original forty-two hearths being reduced to seventeen. In 1812, it was reduced in size with the two tier entrance hall demolished and a number of entrances blocked up. In turn it was renovated in Tuscan style. The contemporary historian George Ormerod did not like Peel Hall, stating " ...it did but ill deserve the eulogiums which have been bestowed upon it, being but an indifferent specimen of the taste which prevailed on the restoration of Italian architecture in this country". In 1952, it was granted grade II* listed status by English Heritage.

== See also ==
- Listed buildings in Horton-cum-Peel
