= List of church restorations, amendments and furniture by John Douglas =

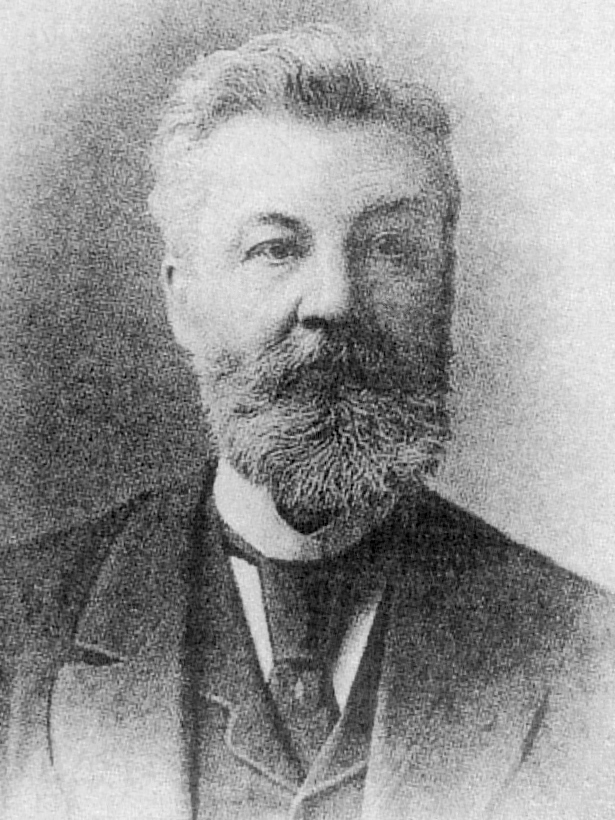
John Douglas in late middle age

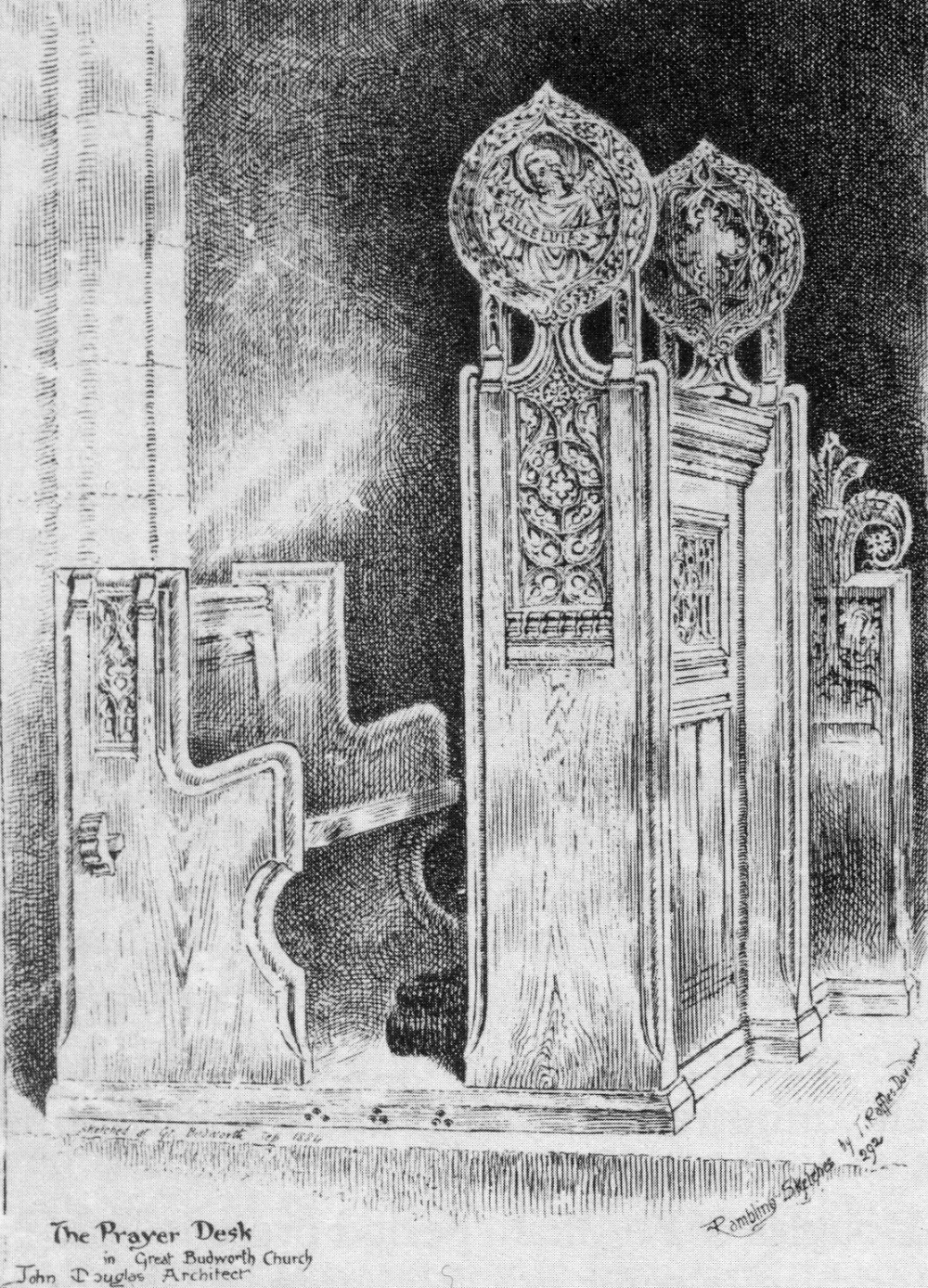
An example of Douglas' church furniture: a prayer desk in St Mary and All Saints' Church, Great Budworth

John Douglas (1830–1911) was an English architect based in Chester, Cheshire. His output included new churches, alterations to and restoration of existing churches, church furnishings, new houses and alterations to existing houses, and a variety of other buildings, including shops, banks, offices, schools, memorials and public buildings. His architectural styles were eclectic, but as he worked during the period of the Gothic Revival, much of his work incorporates elements of the English Gothic style. Douglas is probably best remembered for his incorporation of vernacular elements in his buildings, in particular half-timbering. Of particular importance to Douglas' church furniture is his use of joinery and highly detailed wood carving.

John Douglas was born in the Cheshire village of Sandiway and was articled to the Lancaster architect E. G. Paley, later becoming his chief assistant. He established an office in Chester in either 1855 or 1860, from where he practised throughout his career. Initially he ran the office himself but in 1884 he appointed his assistant, Daniel Porter Fordham, as a partner. When Fordham retired in 1897, he was succeeded by Charles Howard Minshull. In 1909 this partnership was dissolved and Douglas ran the office alone until his death in 1911. As his office was in Chester, most of his works were in Cheshire and North Wales, although some were further afield, in Lancashire, Staffordshire, Warwickshire, and Scotland.

From an early stage in his career, Douglas attracted commissions from wealthy and powerful patrons, the first of which came from Hugh Cholmondeley, 2nd Baron Delamere. His most important patrons were the Grosvenor family of Eaton Hall, namely Richard Grosvenor, 2nd Marquess of Westminster; Hugh Grosvenor, 1st Duke of Westminster; and Hugh Grosvenor, 2nd Duke of Westminster. Douglas designed a large number and variety of buildings in the family's Eaton Hall estate and the surrounding villages. Other important patrons were William Molyneux, 4th Earl of Sefton; Rowland Egerton-Warburton of Arley Hall; George Cholmondeley, 5th Marquess of Cholmondeley; and Francis Egerton, 3rd Earl of Ellesmere. Later in his career Douglas carried out commissions for W. E. Gladstone and his family, and for W. H. Lever.

Most of the churches on which Douglas worked have been recognised as listed buildings by English Heritage, Historic Environment Scotland or, in Wales, by Cadw. In England and Wales a Grade I listed building is one "of exceptional interest, sometimes considered to be internationally important", Grade II* consists of "particularly important buildings of more than special interest", and in Grade II are buildings which "are nationally important and of special interest". There is only one Scottish church in the list; it is graded in Category A. This category contains "buildings of national or international importance, either architectural or historic, or fine little-altered examples of some particular period, style or building type".

Douglas' church restorations were influenced by the Oxford Movement, which advocated moving the centre of importance in the church from preaching to the sacrament of the Eucharist; from the pulpit to the altar. Consequences of this included moving the pulpit from a more central position to the side of the church, replacing box pews with open pews, creating a central aisle to give a better view of the altar, and the removal of galleries. Another consequence was that a larger chancel was required for the associated ritual. Douglas' father was a joiner by trade and it is likely that this influenced his own work. One of the hallmarks of Douglas' designs is his attention to detail, especially in respect to wooden articles, and this applies to his items of church furniture. Examples of all these features are to be found in this list, which consists of the works carried out by Douglas, alone or in conjunction with his partners, on pre-existing churches and includes restorations, additions and amendments to churches, and ecclesiastical furnishings. The details have been taken from the Catalogue of Works in the biography by Edward Hubbard. Work on churches attributed to Douglas by Hubbard on stylistic grounds together with evidence of a local association, even though they are not confirmed by other reliable evidence, are included. Where this is the case, it is stated in the Notes column. Unexecuted schemes are not included.

== Key ==
Grade	Criteria
Grade I	Buildings of exceptional interest, sometimes considered to be internationally important.
Grade II*	Particularly important buildings of more than special interest.
Grade II	Buildings of national importance and special interest.
Category (Scotland)	Criteria
A	Buildings of national or international importance, either architectural or historic, or fine little-altered examples of some particular period, style or building type.
"—" denotes a work that is not graded.

== Church restorations, alterations and furniture ==
Name	Location	Image	Date	Notes	Grade
St Mary's Church	Eastham, Merseyside; 53.3132°N 2.9614°W	A church in red sandstone, the steeple with pinnacles to the left and the body of the church, with round-headed windows to the right. In front of the church are trees, a wall, and steps leading to the churchyard which contains a table tomb.	1. 1862–63; 2. 1881–82; 3. 1886; 4. Undated	Douglas' work in 1862 consisted of the restoration of the chancel. The later works are attributed to him; they comprise a southeast vestry and organ chamber, a lych gate, and a screen in the northeast chapel.	II
St Dunawd's Church	Bangor Is-Coed, Wrexham County Borough; 53.0025°N 2.9123°W	A red sandstone church seen from the north with a tower containing a clock face to the right. The nearest aisle is crenellated and in the churchyard in the foreground are gravestones, most of which are tilted	1. 1868; 2. 1877	Douglas was married in this church in 1860. In 1868 he restored the chancel and provided stalls and rails; in 1877 he added a north porch, replaced the south aisle and added pews and a pulpit.	II*
St Chad's Church	Farndon, Cheshire; 53.0840°N 2.8774°W	The tower and part of the body of a church seen from the northeast. On the tower is a flag and on its north face is a clock; tombs are in the foreground	1869	St Chad's was badly damaged during the Civil War and had to be almost completely rebuilt. Douglas restored the Barnston Chapel in the south transept.	II*
St Mary's Church	Dodleston, Cheshire; 53.1416°N 2.9554°W	A church seen from the north; to the right is a tower with a small pyramidal spire; projecting from the church are a gabled transept and a timber-framed porch. In the foreground are gravestones	1869–70	Douglas rebuilt almost the whole of an older church, including replacing the nave and chancel and adding an upper stage and a short spire to the tower. He also designed the lych gate and boundary wall, which were paid for by the 1st Duke of Westminster.	II
St Alban's Church	Tattenhall, Cheshire; 53.1222°N 2.7688°W	A red sandstone church seen from the south; on the left is a tower with a clock; the body of the church is to the right with a timber-framed porch. A path leads to the door in the porch with gravestones on each side	1869–70	Retaining the tower and most of the aisle walls from an older church, Douglas rebuilt the rest of the church in Perpendicular style, and added a timber-framed porch.	II*
St Garmon's Church	Llanarmon-yn-Iâl, Denbighshire; 53.0965°N 3.2100°W	A simple church with a double nave, that on the right being the higher; at the far end is a bellcote containing two bells; in the foreground are gravestones in various shapes, including a cross	1870	St Garmon's dates mainly from 1736, and contains some medieval fabric. Douglas' restoration probably included the addition of bracing to the colonnade and Gothic-style windows. The pulpit is also attributed to him.	I
St Peter's Church	Little Budworth, Cheshire; 53.1839°N 2.6022°W	A sandstone church seen from the south; on the left is a crenellated tower with a square clock face; to the right is the body of the church with a doorway and two windows, all round-headed	1870–71	St Peter's is a Georgian church. Douglas' restoration included removal of the pews, the gallery, and the ceiling.	II*
St Mary's Church	Lymm, Cheshire; 53.3771°N 2.4784°W	A sandstone church seen from the southeast; to the left is a tower with crocketted pinnacles and to the right is the body of the church with a clerestory and a gabled transept. In the foreground are gravestones and a bush	1870–72	Douglas made additions and alterations to the church, and designed the organ chamber and reredos.	II
St John's Church	Burwardsley, Cheshire; 53.1035°N 2.7251°W	A small church seen from the south through the branches of a tree; directly ahead are the porch and a spirelet; to the right is the body of the church	1. 1871; 2. c. 1878	The restoration of 1871 included the addition of a bell turret. The later restoration, which included the addition of a chancel, is attributed to Douglas.	II
St Bartholomew's Church	Great Barrow, Cheshire; 53.2094°N 2.7957°W	A church seen from the south; to the left is the tower with a round blue clock face, in the middle is the nave, and at a lower level to the right is the chancel. Immediately in the foreground is a wall behind which is a large monument surmounted by a Celtic cross; behind this are many gravestones	1. 1871; 2. 1883	Some restoration was carried out in 1871 but more extensive work was done in 1883; this included an almost complete rebuilding of the nave, which in the opinion of the authors of the Buildings of England series was "carefully done".	II*
St Chad's Church	Holt, Wrexham County Borough; 53.0809°N 2.8791°W	A church seen from the southeast at a distance; the crenellated tower is to the left and the body of the church has Perpendicular style windows. In front of the church is a field with bushes to the left and right	1871–73	Restoration of the chancel was carried out by Ewan Christian, while Douglas was responsible for the rest of the church. His work included the vaulting of the under-tower space.	I
St Mary's Church	Whitegate, Cheshire; 53.2199°N 2.5571°W	A path leads to a black-and-white timber-framed porch with a flagpole. The body of the church extends on both sides and beyond the porch is a broach spire with a clock face	1874–75	This was a major restoration with the addition of a short chancel, which was largely paid for by the 2nd Baron Delamere. The medieval arcading and 18th century walling were retained.	II
St Paul's Church	Boughton, Chester; 53.1919°N 2.8724°W	A church in an elevated position with a steep roof and a pinnacle to the left. In front of the church are black-and-white buildings and in the left foreground are the branches of a tree	1. 1876; 2. 1902; 3. 1905	Douglas worshipped at this church. The 1876 work was virtually a rebuilding, incorporating parts of an earlier church. The south aisle was added in 1902, and the clock turret dated 1905 is attributed to Douglas.	II*
St John the Baptist's Church	Chester; 53.1890°N 2.8856°W	A red sandstone church seen from the northeast, with a clerestory and a gabled transept. To the left and in front of the church are leafless trees	1. 1876–77; 2. 1881–82; 3. 1886–87; 4. 1887	In 1876 Douglas added the wall, gate and railings to the churchyard, made alterations to the chancel seats and designed a reredos. The Early English west tower of the church collapsed in 1881, destroying the north porch; Douglas rebuilt this in a similar style. In 1886–87 he added a bell tower to the northeast of the church and in 1887 he rebuilt the north aisle in Early English style, which was paid for by the 1st Duke of Westminster.	I
St Peter's Church	Northop, Flintshire; 53.2081°N 3.1299°W	A church seen from the northeast, the tower to the right; both the tower and the body of the church have crenellations and pinnacles. In front of the church is the churchyard with a variety of gravestones	1. 1876–77; 2. 1879; 3. 1880	In 1876–77 Douglas carried out a restoration of the church, removed the west gallery, the box pews and the three-decker pulpit, and replaced them with furnishings of his own design. In 1879 he enriched the altar table and the following year he restored the upper part of the tower.	I
St Mark's Church	Connah's Quay, Flintshire; 53.2212°N 3.0637°W	A sandstone church seem from the northwest; the tower to the right has a small pyramidal spire. In the foreground is a wall and a lych gate with a banner saying "Christmas Joy to All"	1876–78	St Mark's dates from 1836 to 1837. Douglas' restoration included a new chancel "in a discreetly more competent lancet style".	II
St Deiniol's Church	Hawarden, Flintshire; 53.1859°N 3.0258°W	A church seen from a distance; on the left is a tower with a pyramidal spire and a round clock face; the body to the right is crenellated. In the foreground are gravestones and on each side are bushes and trees	1. 1877; 2. 1884; 3. 1896; 4. c. 1901–06; 5. 1908–09	Work on this church was carried out for W. E. Gladstone and his family. In 1877 a gateway was added in memory of Sir S. R. Glynne. In 1884 improvements were made to the Whitley Chancel. A chancel porch was added in 1896 and between 1901 and 1906 further restorations and alterations were carried out. Vestries were added in 1908–09.	II*
St Mary's Church	Weaverham, Cheshire; 53.2638°N 2.5757°W	A sandstone church seen from the west with the tower prominent. To the left is a tree and part of a red car, and to the right is a lamppost	1. 1877; 2. 1880–81	Douglas carried out a restoration of the church in 1877, which included work on the furnishings. In 1880–81 he added a wall to the churchyard.	I
St Mary's Church	Tilston, Cheshire; 53.0497°N 2.8109°W	A red sandstone crenellated church tower in front of which are yew trees and a wall	1877–79	The work involved a major restoration which included a new chancel, a vestry and a roof to the nave.	II*
St Mary's Church	Mold, Flintshire; 53.1691°N 3.1430°W	The south front of a church, with a porch and a tower to the left. The tower and the body of the church have pinnacles and crenellations	1878	Douglas designed a reredos for this church.	I
All Saints' Church	Gresford, Wrexham County Borough; 53.088°N 2.9773°W	A church seen from the southwest with the tower on the left and the body of the church, with clerestory and south aisle, to the right. The tower has crocketted pinnacles and the body of the church is crenellated	1. 1879; 2. 1895; 3. 1908–10; 4. 1911–12	In 1879 a reredos was designed by Douglas and side wings were added in 1895. A vestry was added in 1908–10 and an organ case in 1911–12.	I
St Werburgh's Old Church	Warburton, Greater Manchester; 53.4020°N 2.4578°W	A small brick-built church with the tower in the centre. To the right are gravestones and in the background are trees	c. 1880	Repairs were carried out for Rowland Egerton-Warburton. These included the replacement of the eastern end of the church by enlarging it and adding half-timbered gables, a low tower and a short broach spire.	I
St Mary's Church	Betws Gwerful Goch, Denbighshire; 53.0079°N 3.4436°W	A very small, simple, single-story building with a gabled projection to the left. A few thin gravestones stand in front of the church	1881–82	The restoration of an early medieval church included the removal of the north door, the addition of a vestry, the replacement of windows, and the addition of a new bellcote with a spire, and a lychgate.	II*
St Garmon's Church	Llanfechain, Powys; 52.7753°N 3.2037°W	A church built in irregular stones with a red tiled roof seen from the southwest. On the west front is a round window and above this is a small spire. Protruding from the south wall is a red-tiled, timber-framed porch	1883	St Garmon's is a small ancient church which retains some Norman features; Douglas' restoration included "a thorough scraping, stripping and refitting".	II
St Mary and All Saints' Church	Great Budworth, Cheshire; 53.2936°N 2.5043°W	A sandstone church seen from the west with the tower prominent. In front of this is a wall leading to a lych gate on the left. In front of the wall are stocks	c. 1884	St Mary's is a large church in Perpendicular style; Douglas designed carved wooden prayer desks (or clergy stalls) for A. H. Smith-Barry.	I
St Peter's Church	Chester; 53.1904°N 2.8918°W	In the centre is a church tower with a small pyramidal spire; to the right is the body of the church and to the left a building containing a shop and part of Chester Rows. In front of the church is a street on each side of which are black-and-white buildings containing shops and Rows, with the back of a grey-coloured car in the left foreground	1886	St Peter's stands at Chester Cross; the restoration included the addition of a pyramidal spire to the tower.	I
St Oswald's Church	Malpas, Cheshire; 53.0195°N 2.7670°W	A red sandstone Perpendicular-style church seen from the east at a low angle. In the foreground is a wall, partly in shadow, behind which are daffodils and a vertical public footpath signpost	c. 1866	This church stands in a prominent position in the centre of the village of Malpas; Douglas' restoration included the stripping of plaster from the interior of the church and removal of the box pews	I
St Peter's Church	Waverton, Cheshire; 53.1645°N 2.8065°W	A curving road with buildings in the distance on the left and a church with a relatively large tower on the right. In front of the church are gravestones, a wall, and signs reading "Village Road" and "Long Lane"	1887–89	An extensive restoration was carried out for the 1st Duke of Westminster; this included rebuilding the clerestory and, probably, the addition of the pyramidal spire.	II*
St Mary's Church	Cilcain, Flintshire; 53.1771°N 3.2337°W	A broad windowless tower with angle buttresses; to the right is the west wall of the nave; on the left is a tree	1888–89	The restoration was started for the railway engineer W. B. Buddicom, and completed after his death; it includes the addition of south windows, the south porch, the upper stage and buttresses of the tower, and, internally, stalls, pews and the screens in the arcade.	I
Holy Trinity Church	Capenhurst, Cheshire; 53.2573°N 2.9489°W	A red sandstone church seen from the southeast. The chancel is slightly lower than the nave and the tower has a broach spire. Gravestones are in the foreground and part of a tree is to the left	1889–90	The west tower is attributed to Douglas; it has a stair-turret at one corner, a low timber bell stage, and a spire with low broaches.	II
St Peter's Church	Hargrave, Cheshire; 53.1545°N 2.7710°W	A small, simple, red sandstone church seen from the south. On its left is a small spirelet with a clock, and a small porch protrudes from the south wall	1. 1890; 2. Undated	Douglas designed a reredos for the church, and the restoration and addition of a vestry in 1890 is attributed to him.	II*
St Berres' Church	Llanferres, Denbighshire; 53.1360°N 3.2144°W	A small stone church seen from the northwest. On its right is a simple octagonal tower. Immediately in front of the church is a yew tree and in the foreground to the right is a chest tomb	1891–92	Douglas removed the plaster from the walls and designed wooden furniture for the church.	II
St Michael's Church	Marbury, Cheshire; 53.0062°N 2.6564°W	A sandstone church seen from the south at a distance standing on a mound. The tower to the left has crocketted pinnacles and the nave and aisle are crenellated. The foreground consists of a grassy field	1891–92	This extensive restoration included redesigning the chancel in Perpendicular style, and removing a plaster ceiling, replacing it with an open roof containing carved tracery; Douglas also designed furnishings including seating for the chancel and nave, and an organ case.	II*
St Oswald's Church	Backford, Cheshire; 53.2388°N 2.9033°W	A sandstone church tower seen from a low angle with part of a tree to its left	1892	Douglas designed a reredos for the church.	II*
Christ Church	Abbeystead, Lancashire; 53.9839°N 2.6860°W	A small church seen from the southeast. The tower has a small pyramidal spire, a porch protrudes from the south wall, and the chancel to the right is short and slightly lower than the nave. Gravestones in shadow are in the foreground	1892–94	Douglas carried out a remodelling for the 4th Earl of Sefton; this included adding a low tower with a spirelet and a short chancel with Perpendicular windows, and replacing the nave windows.	II
St Mark's Church	Worsley, Greater Manchester; 53.5023°N 2.3849°W	A church with a prominent spire seen from the northwest. Beyond the tower is the body of the church with a clerestory and north aisle. In the foreground are gravestones, the nearest one of which carries a sculpted cross	1894	Douglas designed a lectern for the church.	II*
St Michael's Church	Trelawnyd, Flintshire; 53.3058°N 3.3686°W	—	1895–97	A vestry was added to the northwest of the church, the plaster was removed from the interior, a Perpendicular style east window was inserted, and mullions and tracery were added to the windows on the south of the church.	II*
St Twrog's Church	Maentwrog, Gwynedd; 52.94560°N 3.98950°W	An engraving of an arch through which is a church with a broach spire. Gates frame the arch and on the right stands a girl in Victorian dress	1. 1896; 2. 1897	In the remodelling of 1896 Douglas added a spire and did much work on the structural woodwork of the interior; the following year he designed a lych gate.	II
St Matthew's Church	Buckley, Flintshire; 53.1745°N 3.0726°W	A stone church seen from the south. The tower on the left has a clock face, a flagpole and a weather vane; the body of the church has a timber-framed clerestory. In front of the church is a churchyard with gravestones, a crucifix, a lych gate, a notice board, a yew tree, and a wall. A road runs through the foreground with a lamppost to the left of the church tower	1. 1897–99; 2.c. 1901–02; 3. 1902; 4. 1904	Douglas carried out work on this church for W. E. Gladstone and his family. In 1897–99 he added vestries, and later a chancel, a southwest porch and a lych gate. About this time he also remodelled the tower and, in 1904, he rebuilt the nave and added aisles.	II*
St Michael's Church	Manafon, Powys; 52.6128°N 3.3113°W	A small, simple, low church seen from the south. A small porch protrudes and to the left, and a small spire with a timber lower stage	1898	A restoration was carried out for Rev and Mrs T. J. Williams. Plaster was removed from the walls, the chancel floor was raised, the seating was replaced, and a screen was added between the nave and chancel. Douglas provided a new pulpit, lectern, prayer desks, altar rails and table, sedilia and a credence table, and he also designed the lych gate.	II*
St Beuno's Church	Penmorfa, Gwynedd; 52.9402°N 4.1721°W	A very simple, small church seen from the north with a small bellcote on its right. There are many gravestones and tombs in the foreground	1899	Douglas carried out a restoration for R. M. Greaves.	II*
St John's Church	Trofarth, Conwy County Borough; 53.2311°N 3.7131°W	A small church with a decorated roof seen from the southeast. On the west gable is a simple bell tower. In front of the church is a row of small yews and in the foreground are gravestones	1899	Douglas added a northeast vestry and an organ chamber, replaced the internal plaster with limestone fragments, extended the chancel into the nave and provided furnishings.	II
St John the Evangelist's Church	Ashton Hayes, Cheshire; 53.2230°N 2.7397°W	A tall spire is on the left and part of the body of the church is on the right. Steps lead to a porch and the whole is framed by trees	1900	Alterations were made to the chancel and a vestry was added.	II
St Elphin's Church	Warrington, Cheshire; 53.3910°N 2.5799°W	A sandstone church with a very tall spire and a protruding transept seen from the south. In front of the church is a grassed area containing a bench and to the left is a tree	1903	Douglas designed a screen for the northeast (Boteler) chapel.	II*
St Chad's Church	Over, Winsford, Cheshire; 53.1818°N 2.5249°W	A substantial red sandstone church seen from the southeast. The tower and body of the church are crenellated. In the churchyard are gravestones and at the right extremity is a tree in flower	1. 1904; 2. 1907	In 1904 Douglas widened the north aisle and in 1907 he added a baptistery.	II*
Church of the Resurrection and All Saints	Caldy, Merseyside53.3584°N 3.1641°W	A small church seen from the southwest with a south porch. At the far end a saddleback-roofed tower is just visible. Around the church are trees and bushes and in the foreground is a wall	1906–07	This building originated as a school designed by G. E. Street in 1868. Douglas converted it into a church, adding a chancel and a saddleback roof.	II
All Saints' Church	St Andrews, Fife; 56.3415°N 2.7901°W	—	1907	Douglas designed the chancel and the bell tower. Further work was done on the church in 1924 by Paul Waterhouse.	A
Holy Trinity Church	Greenfield, Flintshire; 53.2894°N 3.2102°W	—	1910	Douglas added the chancel to a church designed in 1870–71 by Ewan Christian.	II
All Saints' Church	Hoole, Chester; 53.2012°N 2.8727°W	—	1912	In collaboration with F. (or J.) Walley the south aisle was added. This was not completed until after Douglas' death.	II
Christ Church	Bala, Gwynedd; 52.9125°N 3.5972°W	—	Undated	Douglas designed stalls and prayer desks for the church.	II
St Mary's Church	Edmonton, Middlesex; 51.6181°N 0.0635°W	—	Undated	The addition of the southwest porch has been attributed to Douglas. The church has been demolished.	—

== See also ==
- List of new churches by John Douglas
- List of houses and associated buildings by John Douglas
- List of non-ecclesiastical and non-residential works by John Douglas
