= Church of St Cuthbert by the Forest =

Coordinates: 53.2304°N 2.7331°W

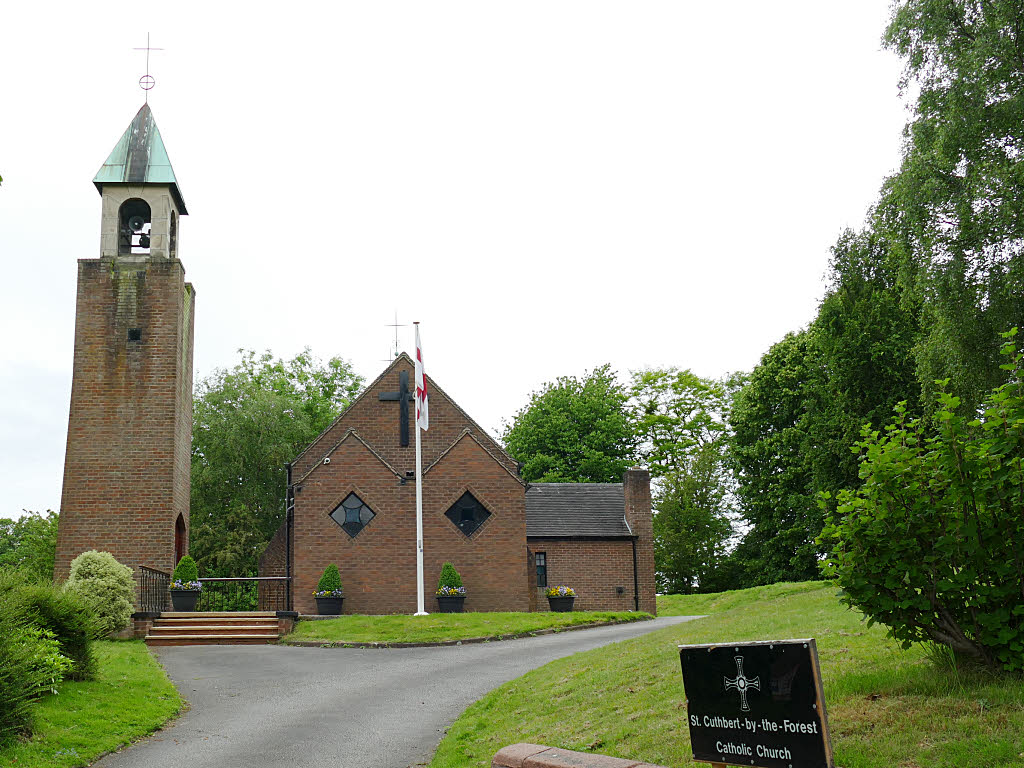
- Eastern aspect

- Location in Cheshire
- OS grid reference: SJ 512 706
- Location: Mouldsworth, Cheshire
- Country: England
- Denomination: Roman Catholic

History
- Status: Parish church
- Dedication: Saint Cuthbert

Architecture
- Functional status: Active
- Heritage designation: Grade II
- Designated: 26 March 2014
- Architect: F. X. Velarde
- Architectural type: Church
- Style: Arts and Crafts with Gothic and Germanic references
- Groundbreaking: 1953
- Completed: 1955
- Construction cost: Church £7,000; Campanile £1,000

Specifications
- Materials: Brick, artificial stone, tiled roof

Administration
- Diocese: Shrewsbury
- Parish: Saint Thomas Becket & Saint Cuthbert by the Forest

The Church of St Cuthbert by the Forest (Note: The forest is the nearby Delamere Forest.) is in the village of Mouldsworth, Cheshire, England. It is an active Roman Catholic church in the diocese of Shrewsbury. Its parish is combined with that of St Thomas Becket, Tarporley. The church, designed by Liverpool architect F. X. Velarde, is recorded in the National Heritage List for England as a designated Grade II listed building. The small church is distinguished by its characteristic detached campanile.

== History ==
Mass was first said in the area in 1926 in a pavilion behind what was then the Station Hotel. (Note: This now known as the Goshawk.) In the 1950s, the owners of the hotel bought land to the south of the hotel and gave it to the diocese. The church was designed by F. X. Velarde, and was opened in September 1955 by John Murphy, Roman Catholic Bishop of Shrewsbury. The church cost £7,000, and the detached campanile £1,000. In about 1958 the church became part of Tarporley parish. The interior was reordered in 1976.

== Architecture ==
=== Exterior ===
St Cuthbert's is a small church designed to seat 72 people. Its design is influenced by the Arts and Crafts movement, together with some Gothic and Germanic references. The exterior is faced with brick, the dressings are in artificial stone, and the church is roofed in Staffordshire tiles. There is a detached campanile to the southeast of the church. The church is orientated with the sanctuary at the west end; the following description will use the liturgical orientation. Its plan consists of a three-bay nave with a south sacristy, a narthex at the west end, and an apsidal sanctuary. The narthex has two gables, each containing a diamond-shaped window, and a main entrance on the north side. The windows along the sides of the nave are paired lancets separated by artificial stone mullions carved with angels. The sacristy has a south doorway, and windows on the south, west and east walls, those on the east having angel mullions. The apse is without windows, but on the sides of the sanctuary are windows similar to those on the nave. On the roof of the nave are three decorative cross finials. The brick campanile is almost 44 feet (13.4 m) high, and it has a stone bellcote containing electronic speakers. On the top is a copper pyramidal roof with a cross finial.

=== Interior ===
The interior of the church is in brick, with the ceilings and apse plastered. In the nave are two wide diaphragm arches, and there is a similar arch at the entrance to the sanctuary. The windows contain cathedral glass, and the mullions are also carved on the interior with angels. The Stations of the Cross are in wood that was carved in the South Tyrol. Behind the altar is a shelf on which is a tabernacle. In the south wall of the nave are the entrances to the sacristy and the confessional. The narthex contains a small chapel.

== See also ==
- Listed buildings in Mouldsworth

== Notes and references ==
Notes

Citations
