= Barrow Hall =

Barrow Hall may refer to:

- Barrow Hall, Cheshire, a grade II-listed building in Barrow, Cheshire, England
- Barrow Hall, Lincolnshire, a grade I-listed building in Barrow upon Humber, England
- Barrow Hall, a fictional castle in the Song of Ice and Fire series
