= Listed buildings in Ashton Hayes =

Ashton Hayes is a former civil parish, now in the parish of Ashton Hayes and Horton-cum-Peel, in Cheshire West and Chester, England. It contains six buildings that are recorded in the National Heritage List for England as designated listed buildings. Other than the village of Ashton Hayes, the parish is rural. One of the buildings is listed at Grade II*, a farmhouse, and the others at Grade II; the latter consist of the village church and hall, a cottage, and a farm building.

== Key ==
Grade	Criteria
Grade II*	Particularly important buildings of more than special interest.
Grade II	Buildings of national importance and special interest.

== Buildings ==
Name and location	Photograph	Date	Notes	Grade
April Cottage; 53.2214°N 2.7406°W	—	17th century or earlier	The cottage was altered in the 19th century and an addition made in the 20th century. It is constructed in rendered stone, and has a thatched roof. The cottage is in 1 1/2 storeys, and has casement windows.	II
Ashton Hall Farmhouse; 53.2158°N 2.7400°W		Early 17th century	This consists of a farmhouse and a cottage added later in the 17th century. The top storey of the farmhouse was remodelled in the 19th century. The building is in sandstone with concrete tile roofs and brick chimneys on the gables. The house is in three storeys with a five-bay front, and the cottage has two storeys and an attic and is in two bays. The windows in the lower storeys of the house are mullioned and transomed, those in the top storey are casements, and in the cottage they are mullioned.	II*
Farm building, Ashton Hall Farm; 53.2159°N 2.7395°W	—	Late 17th century	This originated as stables and a granary, and is built in brick with a slate roof. It is in two storeys, with a four-bay front. On the left side is a flight of external steps and an elliptical window in the gable. Other features include stable doors, ventilation slots, and six-pane windows.	II
St John the Evangelist's Church; 53.2231°N 2.7397°W		1849	A church in Gothic Revival style designed by E. H. Shellard. Additions were made in 1900 by Douglas & Minshull, and in 1932 by Theodore Fyfe. It is constructed in sandstone with Lakeland green slates, and consists of a nave, a chancel, a north aisle with a chapel, and a west tower with a recessed spire.	II
Village Hall; 53.2231°N 2.7389°W		c. 1849	Originally built as the school (used by the primary school until 1980 and as the village hall from 1984) and probably designed by E. H. Shellard. It is constructed in sandstone with Lakeland green slates, and consists of two parallel ranges. The building is in a single storey with five bays. Most windows are mullioned and transomed, with one casement window.	II
War memorial 53.22269°N 2.73954°W	—	1920	The war memorial is in the churchyard of St John the Evangelist's Church. It is in Cornish granite, and consists of a rough-hewn Celtic cross with a wheel-head standing on a tapering pedestal on a single step base, on a concrete podium. On the front of the shaft is a recessed panel containing a broadsword in bas relief, pointing downwards. The pedestal contains a panel with an inscription and the names of those lost in the two World Wars.	II

== See also ==
- Listed buildings in Barrow
- Listed buildings in Delamere
- Listed buildings in Dunham-on-the-Hill
- Listed buildings in Horton-cum-Peel
- Listed buildings in Kelsall
- Listed buildings in Manley
- Listed buildings in Mouldsworth
- Listed buildings in Tarvin
