= Listed buildings in Mouldsworth =

Mouldsworth is a civil parish in Cheshire West and Chester, England. It contains four buildings that are recorded in the National Heritage List for England as designated listed buildings, all of which are at Grade II. This grade is the lowest of the three gradings given to listed buildings and is applied to "buildings of national importance and special interest". The parish is almost completely rural, and three of the listed buildings are, or were, farmhouses; the other is a church.

Name and location	Photograph	Date	Notes
Mouldsworth Hall; 53.2310°N 2.7453°W		Late 16th century	A brick farmhouse on a stone plinth, with a Welsh slate roof and a stone ridge. It has a timber-framed core. The house has an L-shaped plan, is in two storeys, and has a four-bay front. The left hand bay projects forward. The windows are casements.
Stonehouse Farmhouse; 53.2284°N 2.7473°W	—	Late 16th to early 17th century	A farmhouse, later extended and used as a house. Most of it is built in sandstone, with one bay in brick on a stone plinth, and with a concrete tile roof. The house has a long rectangular plan, is in two storeys, and has a five-bay front. It has a two-storey gabled porch with finials. Most of the windows are mullioned and transomed, apart from the brick bay, which has casement windows.
Poplargrove Farmhouse; 53.2296°N 2.7441°W	—	Mid- to late 18th century	A brick farmhouse with a Welsh slate roof and a stone ridge. It has three symmetrical three-storeys and a three-bay front. The windows are casements.
Church of St Cuthbert by the Forest; 53.23036°N 2.73316°W		1953–55	A Roman Catholic church designed by F. X. Velarde, with a detached campanile. It is a small country church built in brick with a tiled roof. It is in Arts and Crafts style, with Germanic and Gothic influences. The church consists of a narthex, a nave, an apsidal sanctuary, and a sacristy. The campanile, which was added later, is nearly 44 feet (13.4 m) high and has a pyramidal roof.

== See also ==
- Listed buildings in Ashton Hayes
- Listed buildings in Barrow
- Listed buildings in Horton-cum-Peel
- Listed buildings in Manley
