= St John the Evangelist's Church, Ashton Hayes =

Coordinates: 53.2230°N 2.7397°W

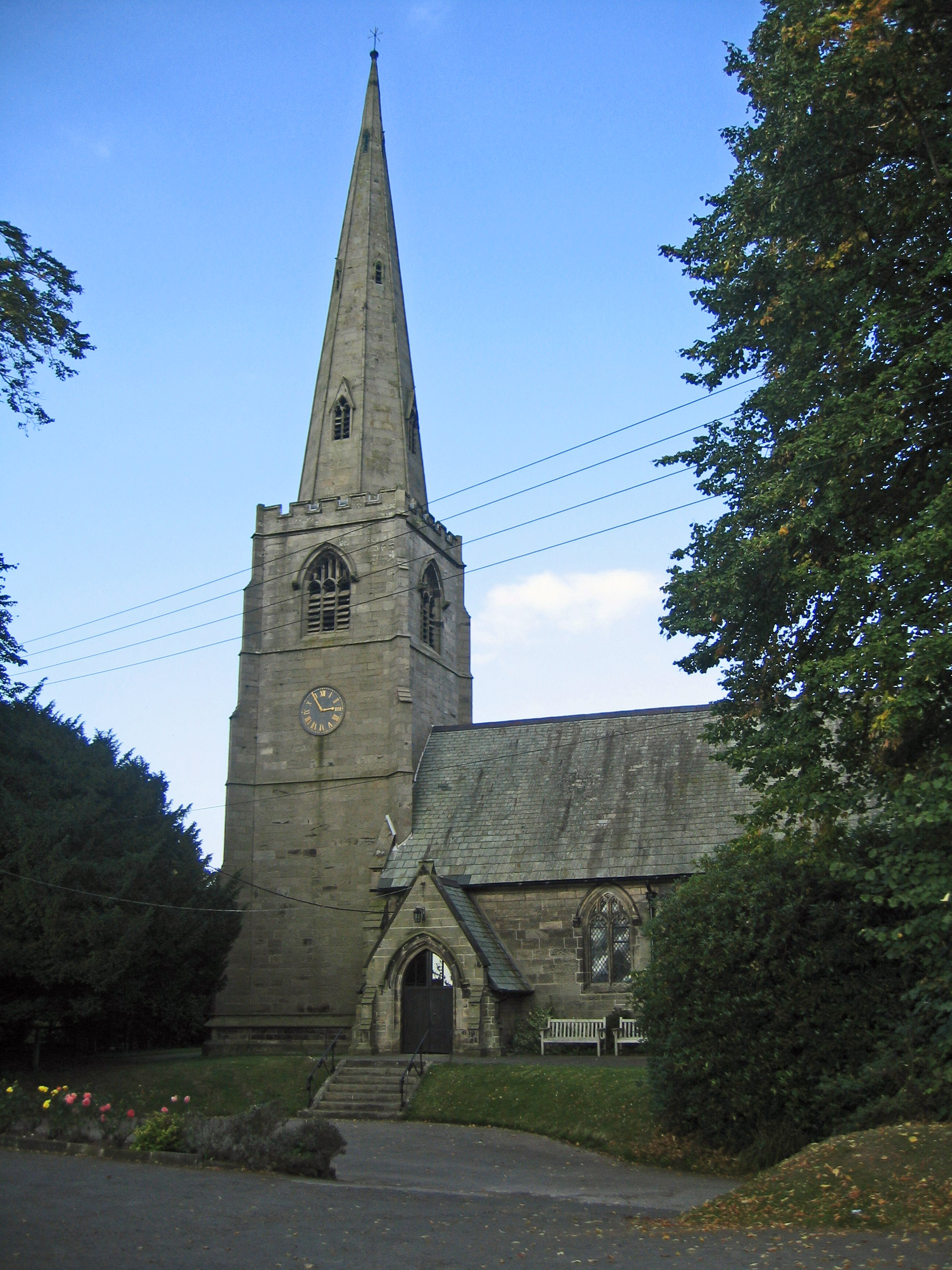
- St John the Evangelist's Church, Ashton Hayes, from the south

- Location in Cheshire
- OS grid reference: SJ 507,698
- Location: Ashton Hayes, Cheshire
- Country: England
- Denomination: Anglican
- Website: St John, Ashton Hayes

History
- Status: Parish church
- Dedication: John the Evangelist

Architecture
- Functional status: Active
- Heritage designation: Grade II
- Designated: 8 November 1985
- Architect(s): 1849 E. H. Shellard; 1900 Douglas and Minshull; 1932 Theodore Fyfe
- Architectural type: Church
- Style: Gothic Revival
- Groundbreaking: 1849
- Completed: 1932

Specifications
- Materials: Buff sandstone Lakeland green slate roof

Administration
- Province: York
- Diocese: Chester
- Archdeaconry: Chester
- Deanery: Chester
- Parish: St John the Evangelist, Ashton Hayes

Clergy
- Vicar: Revd Dr Phil Weston

St John the Evangelist's Church is located to the north of the village of Ashton Hayes, Cheshire, England. It is an active Anglican parish church in the diocese of Chester, the archdeaconry of Chester and the deanery of Chester. The church is recorded in the National Heritage List for England as a designated Grade II listed building.

== History ==
Originally part of the parish of Tarvin, St John's became a separate parish in 1849. In that year the church was built to a design by E. H. Shellard of Manchester at the expense of William Atkinson. A vestry was added and the chancel was altered in 1900 by Douglas and Minshull, and in 1932 a north chapel by Theodore Fyfe was added.

== Architecture ==
=== Exterior ===
The church is built in ashlar buff sandstone and has a Lakeland green slate roof. Its plan consists of a four-bay nave and a two-bay chancel, a north aisle with a chapel at its east end, a south porch and a vestry. At the west end is a tower with a spire. The tower is in three stages on a plinth, with diagonal buttresses, plain bands at each floor, and an embattled parapet. A stair turret projects at the northeast corner. On the west side of the tower is a three-light window. A clock is in the second stage and above this are three-light louvred bell openings. The spire is recessed with lucarnes.

=== Interior ===
The interior is simple with a four-bay arcade to the north. The chancel has a painted roof. The chapel has a flattened apsidal end and its ceiling is barrel vaulted. The pulpit is in Art Nouveau style. In the church is a monument to William Atkinson who died in 1883. The windows contain stained glass bay A. K. Nicholson. The organ is in the west gallery and was built by Charles Whiteley and Company.

== External features ==
The churchyard contains a war grave memorial erected by the Commonwealth War Graves Commission to a Cheshire Regiment soldier of World War II.

== See also ==
- Listed buildings in Ashton Hayes
- List of works by E. H. Shellard
- List of church restorations, amendments and furniture by John Douglas
