= Theodore Fyfe =

Scottish architect

- Born: David Theodore Fyfe; 3 November 1875; Philippines
- Died: 1 January 1945 (aged 69); Longstowe Hall, Cambridgeshire
- Education: The Glasgow Academy, Glasgow School of Art
- Occupation: Architect

David Theodore Fyfe (3 November 1875 – 1 January 1945), known simply as Theodore Fyfe, was a Scottish architect. He is widely known as Arthur Evans’s architect during the first five excavations at the Palace of Knossos from 1900 to 1904.

== Biography ==
Theodore Fyfe was born on 3 November 1875 in the Philippines, second son of James Sloan Fyfe and Jane Charlotte Abercrombie Fyfe. After the deaths of his parents, Fyfe was brought up by his aunt Jane Sloan Fyfe, and uncle John Alexander Fyfe, in Glasgow. He was educated at The Glasgow Academy.

In 1890, he became an apprentice of the architect John James Burnet, then Burnet's assistant after completing his apprenticeship. He took classes at the Glasgow School of Art where he was awarded the Haldane Bursary in 1894. He moved to London in 1897 and studied at the Architectural Association School of Architecture, then at the British School at Athens.

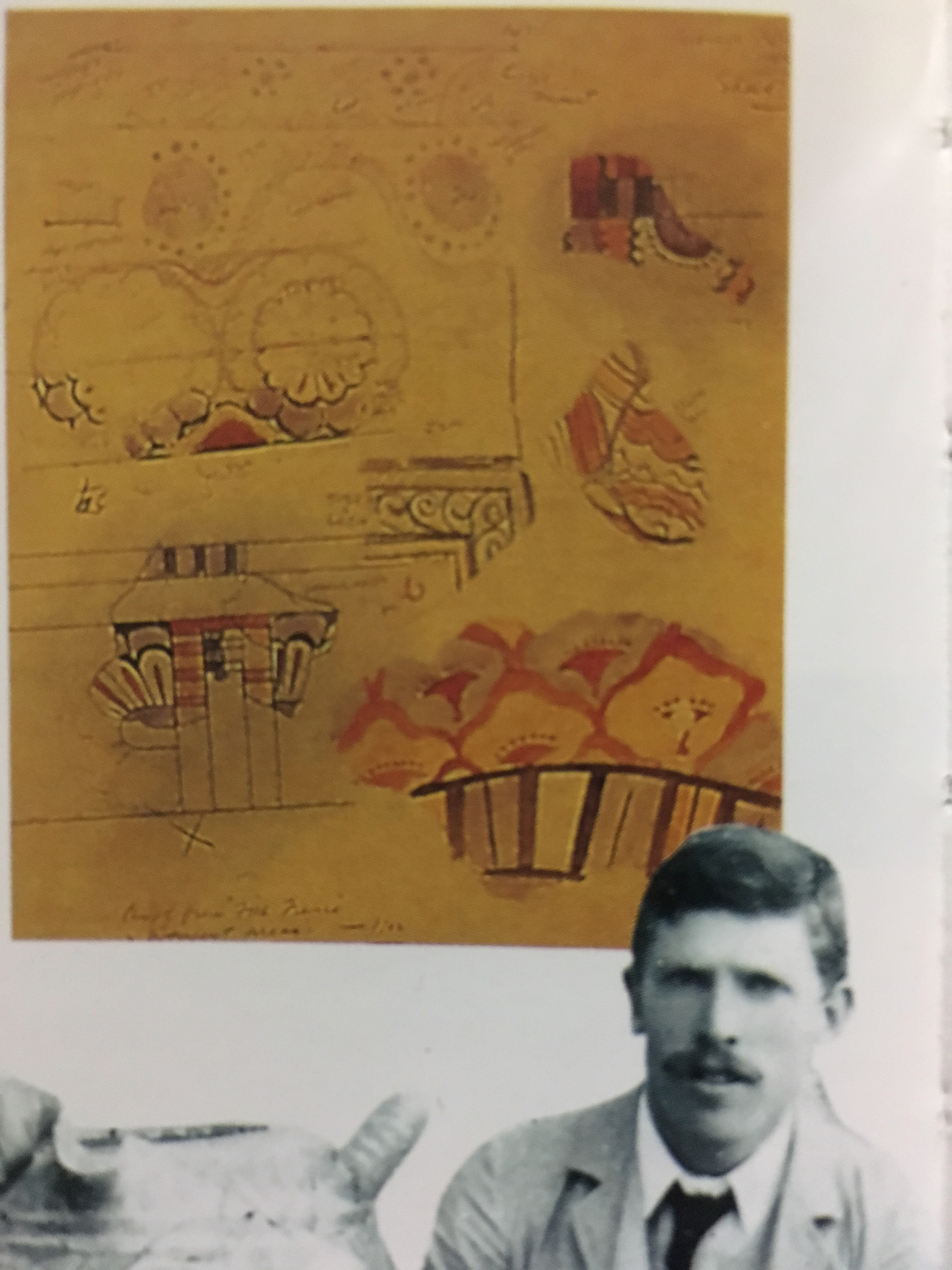
Theodore Fyfe and his sketches of the frescoes of the room of the stone bench.

In 1899–1900 he travelled in the Mediterranean region studying classical architecture. During this period, he joined Arthur Evans’s team as an architect for the excavations at Knossos. On 23 March 1900, the team broke ground at the site of Knossos. Fyfe made a fresco copy of the room of the stone bench. In August, he went back to British School. Later he made a study tour in Bologna, Ferrara and Florence, and a further study tour in Constantinople and Bursa.

Fyfe returned to Crete with Evans. In 1902, he described the principles of restoration of the Palace of Minos. Much of his time in 1903 was spent for the reconstruction of Knossos. He worked on both the graphic reconstruction of the rooms and their preservation. The Throne Room, particularly prestigious, underwent several reconstructions before the one done in 1930 in the antique style.

From 1904 onwards, Fyfe was working mainly for John James Burnet at the British Museum. He was responsible for the designs of the Shaftesbury Institute, hall and classrooms at Charlotte Mason College in Ambleside, Chester Cathedral, Memorial Chapel at Ashton Hayes and built houses in Cambridge and elsewhere.

In 1919, he was appointed architect to the chapter of Chester Cathedral, in 1921, he was lecturer in classical archaeology at Cambridge. From 1922 to 1936, he was Director of the Department of Architecture, University of Cambridge. He revisited Knossos in 1926 and then directed the excavations of a mediaeval church at Glastonbury. He started to travel to Italy, Greece, Turkey, Syria and Egypt in 1932, to study ancient architectural remains. The results of studies are presented in his book Hellenistic Architecture: An Introductory Study, published in 1936. He died in a skating accident in 1945.

== Publications ==
- Hellenistic Architecture: An Introductory Study, Read Books, 2007 (originally published in 1936 by Ares Publishers)
- Architecture in Cambridge: Examples of Architectural Styles from Saxon to Modern Times, Cambridge University Press, 2009 (originally published in 1942)

== Bibliography ==
- Peter Soar, Theodore Fyfe, self-published author, 2009
