= Christ Church, Bala =

Church in Gwynedd, Wales

Coordinates: 52.9125°N 3.5972°W

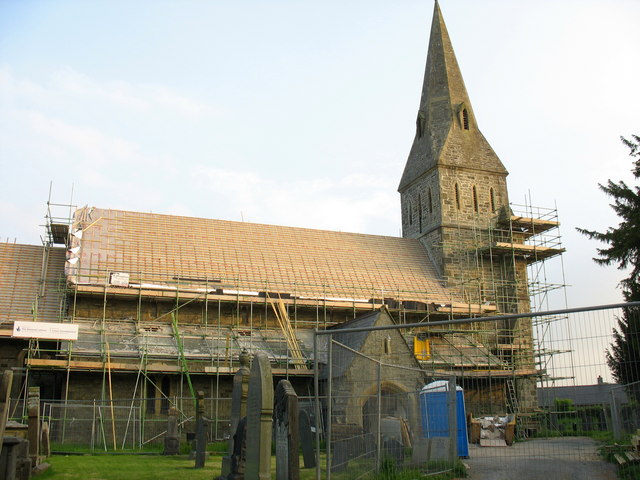
Christ Church, Bala, during restoration in 2007

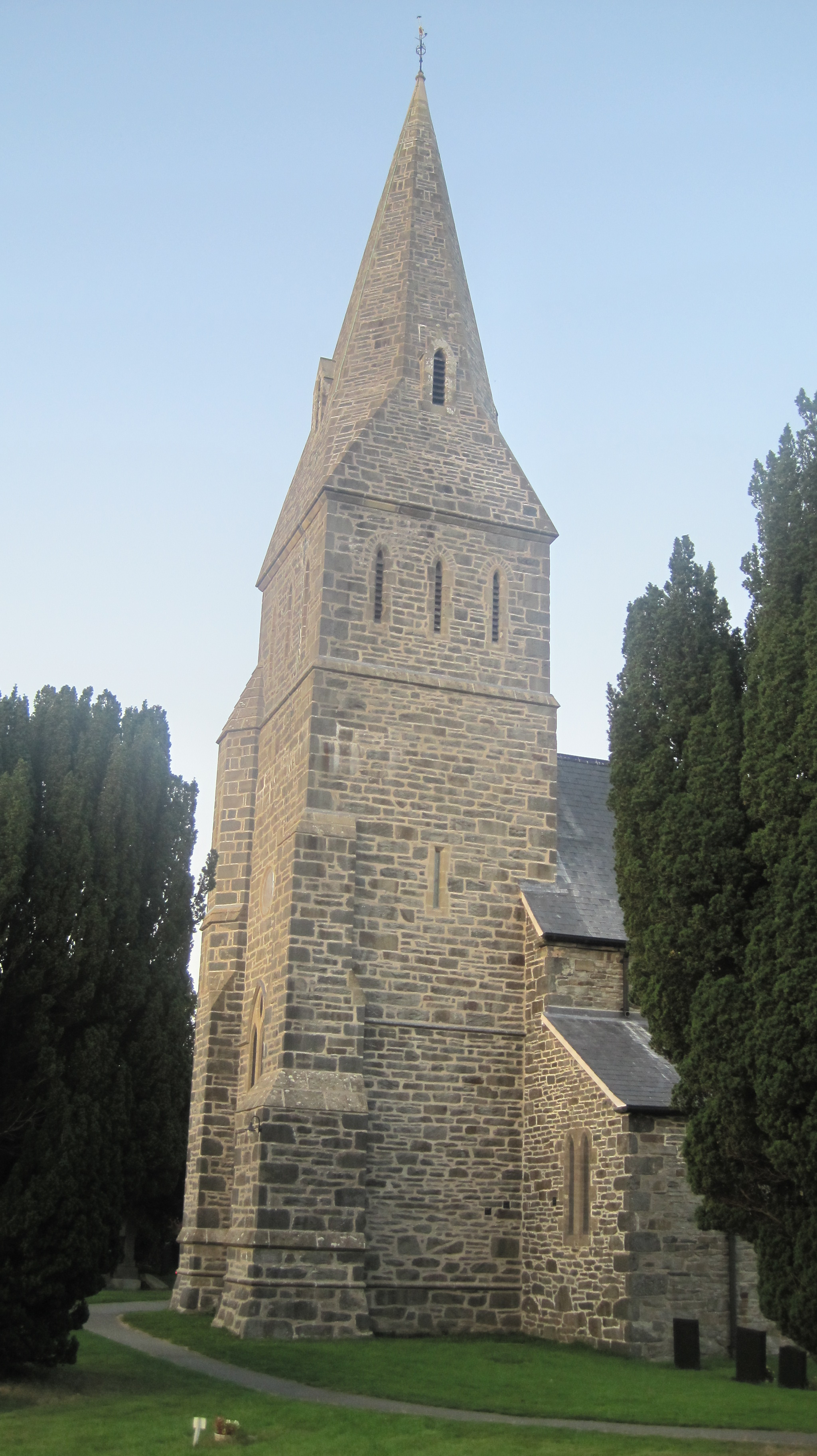
2014

Christ Church, Bala, is in Bala, Gwynedd, Wales (grid reference SH926362). It is an active Anglican church in the deanery of Penllyn & Edeyrnion, the archdeaconry of Wrexham, and the diocese of St Asaph. The church was designated a Grade II listed building on 13 December 2001.

The first church to be built on the site was in 1811. The present church was built between 1853 and 1857. The stalls and prayer desks were designed by the Chester architect John Douglas. By the 2000s the church building had deteriorated and between March and November 2007 repairs and restoration were carried out at a cost of £600,000.

== See also ==
- List of church restorations, amendments and furniture by John Douglas
