= Listed buildings in Horton-cum-Peel =

Horton-cum-Peel is a former civil parish, now in the parish of Ashton Hayes and Horton-cum-Peel, in Cheshire West and Chester, England. It contains five buildings that are recorded in the National Heritage List for England as designated listed buildings. One of these is listed at Grade II*, the middle grade, and the rest are at the lowest grade, Grade II. The parish is entirely rural. The list consists of two farmhouses with associated structures.

== Key ==
Grade	Criteria
II*	Particularly important buildings of more than special interest
II	Buildings of national importance and special interest

== Buildings ==
Name and location	Photograph	Date	Notes	Grade
Horton Hall; 53.2138°N 2.7599°W	—	Late 16th century	The farmhouse was partly rebuilt in the early 18th century, and the façade was replaced in the 19th century. It is constructed in brick, partly on a stone base, and contains some timber-framing. It is roofed in slate. The house consists of a hall with two cross-wings. It is in two storeys, and has a five-bay east front. The end bays project forwards, and are gabled with shaped bargeboards and finials. The windows are casements.	II
Peel Hall; 53.2224°N 2.7527°W		1637	This was built as a mansion, but was much reduced in size by 1812, and was later used as a farmhouse. It is built in sandstone with slate roofs, and is in Jacobean style. The house has an L-shaped plan, is in three storeys with a basement, and has a symmetrical five-bay south front. The doorcase has a Tuscan architrave and a fanlight. The windows are mullioned and transomed. William III was entertained in the house on his way to Ireland to fight the Battle of the Boyne.	II*
West paddock wall, Peel Hall; 53.22207°N 2.75286°W		Early to mid-17th century	The wall provided the west boundary to a 17th-century formal garden. It is constructed in brick, stands on a sandstone base, and has a sandstone coping. The wall stands about 2.2 m (7.2 ft) high.	II
East paddock wall, Peel Hall; 53.22221°N 2.75201°W		Early to mid-17th century	The wall provided the east boundary to a 17th-century formal garden. It is constructed in brick, stands on a sandstone base, and has a sandstone coping. The wall stands about 2.2 m (7.2 ft) high.	II
Garden wall, Peel Hall; 53.22241°N 2.75315°W		Early to mid-17th century	The wall stretches along three sides of a garden to the west of the hall. It is constructed in brick on a stone base, has sandstone dressings, and stands about 1.1 m (3.6 ft) high. There are small gates on all three sides. On the north side is a five-step mounting block. The gateway on the south side is blocked, and has low piers with capstones.	II

== See also ==
- Listed buildings in Ashton Hayes
- Listed buildings in Barrow
- Listed buildings in Delamere
- Listed buildings in Kelsall
- Listed buildings in Manley
- Listed buildings in Mouldsworth
- Listed buildings in Oakmere
- Listed buildings in Tarvin
