= St Mary's Church, Cilcain =

Coordinates: 53.1771°N 3.2337°W

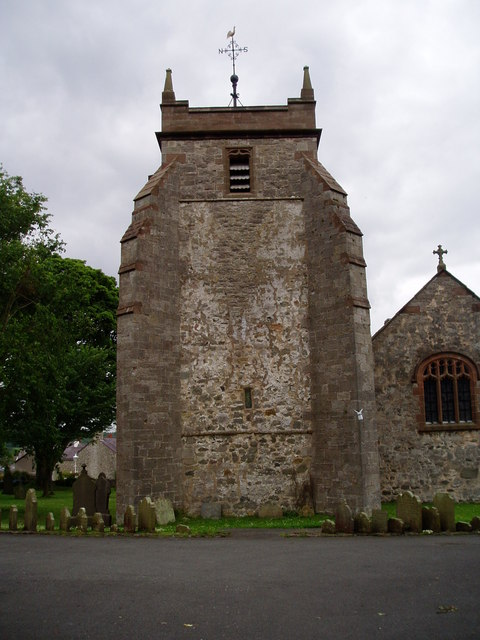
- Tower and west end of St Mary's Church, Cilcain
- St Mary's Church, Cilcain
- OS grid reference: SJ 176,651
- Location: Cilcain, Flintshire
- Country: Wales
- Denomination: Anglican
- Website: St Mary's Church

History
- Status: Parish church

Architecture
- Functional status: Active
- Heritage designation: Grade I
- Designated: 6 November 1962
- Architect(s): Ambrose Poynter, John Douglas (restorations)
- Architectural type: Church
- Style: Gothic
- Groundbreaking: 13th century

Specifications
- Materials: Stone (mixed types), Slate roof

Administration
- Province: Church in Wales
- Diocese: St Asaph
- Archdeaconry: Wrexham
- Parish: Cilcain

Clergy
- Rector: Fr. Daniel J. S. Stroud

St Mary's Church, Cilcain, is in the village of Cilcain, Flintshire, Wales. It is an active Anglican church in the Bro Famau group of parishes, in the Mold Mission Area, in the archdeaconry of Wrexham and the diocese of St Asaph. The church is designated by Cadw as a Grade I listed building.

== History ==
The earliest documentary record of the church is in the Lincoln Taxation of 1291 although it is believed that its origin was in the medieval period. In the 15th century the south nave and tower were added. As a result of a fire in 1532 the north nave was burnt down and it remained without a roof until it was rebuilt in 1746. It is thought that at this time the ornate timber roof was added to the south nave. The tradition is that this came from Basingwerk Abbey but there is no evidence to support this. Also at this time a priest's door in the south wall was blocked and it is possible that a west gallery was constructed. In 1845–46 restoration work took place under the direction of Ambrose Poynter.

A more substantial restoration was carried out by the Chester architect John Douglas between 1888 and 1889 which was paid for by William Barber Buddicom, a railway engineer. During this restoration, plaster was removed from the walls, a screen was placed between the naves and the pews were replaced. The south porch was rebuilt, buttresses were added to the tower, the brickwork on the top of the tower was removed and replaced by stone, and a new window was inserted into the west face of the tower. Windows were renewed on the east, west and south sides of the church, and the organ loft and west gallery were removed. A partition was added to the east end of the north nave to form a vestry and to include the organ. A cellar was built at the west end of the north nave to accommodate heating apparatus. In 1935–37 repairs to the roof were carried out under the direction of F. H. Crossley.

== Architecture ==
=== Exterior ===
The church is built in stone of a variety of types, with a slate roof. Some of the fabric from the 13th century church survives in the north nave. The plan consists of a double nave with a tower at the west end of the north nave, and a south porch. The tower has stepped diagonal buttresses at the west corners and a clasping buttress at the northeast angle. On its north wall is a door under a round-headed arch. The tower is surmounted by a battlemented parapet, a low pyramidal roof and a weathercock.

=== Interior ===
The roof of the south nave has alternating arch-braced and hammerbeam trusses. It is decorated with angels, shields, grotesques and other secular subjects. Furnishings designed by Douglas include the pews, the stalls and the screens in the arcade. The east window contains stained glass which is said to be dated 1546; it depicts the Crucifixion. In the church are boards painted with the Creed and the Lord's Prayer in Welsh, dated 1809. Of the monuments, one is dated 1731, and another 1832.

== External features ==
The churchyard is oval in shape and contains the base of an old cross and the stone plinth of a former sundial. To the east of the church is a lych gate, adjoining which is a hearse house dating from about 1810. The hearse house, together with the churchyard walls and the lych gate were designated as a Grade II listed building on 16 October 1995.

== See also ==
- List of church restorations, amendments and furniture by John Douglas
- St Mary's Cilcain, Curious Clwyd
