= F. X. Velarde =

F. X. Velarde OBE
- Born: Francis Xavier Velarde; 1897; Liverpool, England
- Died: 28 December 1960 (aged 62–63); Crosby, Liverpool, England
- Occupation: architect
- Notable work: Shrine of Our Lady of Lourdes; St Gabriel's, Blackburn

Francis Xavier Velarde OBE (1897 – 28 December 1960) was an English architect who practised in Liverpool, Merseyside, England.

== Biography ==
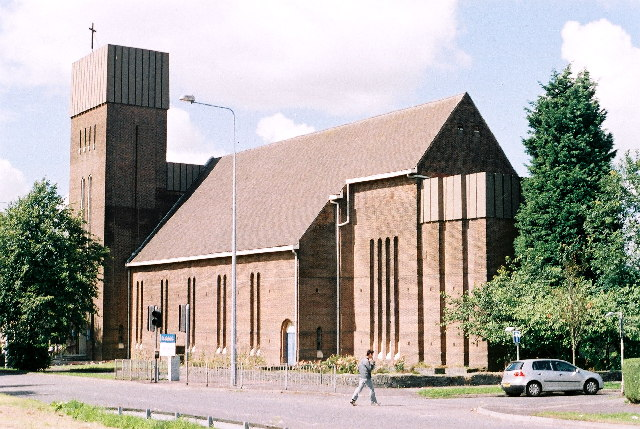
St Gabriel's Church, Blackburn (completed 1934)

Velarde was trained at the Liverpool School of Architecture from 1920, and from 1928 taught at the school. In the 1957 New Year Honours, he was appointed Officer of the Order of the British Empire (OBE). His works are located mainly in Merseyside and Northwest England, and the majority of them were Catholic churches. He was influenced by architectural developments on the Continent, in particular by the German Dominikus Böhm. It is unlikely that he was at all influenced by his Chilean father, who died when he was five years old. He was later destined for a career in the merchant navy but was conscripted from there into the RNVR and served in the trenches to be gassed at Passchendaele, thus inevitably shortening his life. On leaving the army he went to Liverpool art school where he was discovered by Charles Reilly and given a place at Liverpool School of Architecture. His design of St Gabriel, Blackburn, is considered to be "one of the milestones in the development of English church architecture towards Modern Movement style".

Although Pollard and Pevsner state that he "worked exclusively for the Roman Catholic Church", he did design one Anglican church, St Gabriel, Blackburn. Five of his churches have been recorded in the National Heritage List for England as designated listed buildings. The Church of St. Monica, Bootle, was upgraded from Grade II to Grade I status in 2017; the Shrine of Our Lady of Lourdes in Blackpool, and English Martyrs' Church, Wallasey are listed at Grade II*, and listed at Grade II are St Teresa's Church, Upholland and Holy Cross Church, Bidston. He also designed Roman Catholic schools, one of which is in Birkdale.

His Church of St Vincent de Paul and St Louise of Marillac in Potters Bar (Hertfordshire) was completed in 1962, after his death, but subsequently demolished. The practice continued after his death as F. X. Velarde Partners whose work includes St Michael and All Angels Church, Woodchurch, Birkenhead, by Richard O'Mahony (1965).

Dominic Wilkinson reviewed his work more than sixty years after his death. He noted Velarde's frequent pairing of blue and gold in interior design, and his preference for brick, or stone when the budget stretched to it, rather than concrete. But Wilkinson criticised Velarde's engineering skill, his handling of rainwater, noting that his aversion to rainwater gutters and pipes on main frontages had left a legacy of leaks, and that there was a pattern of his underfloor heating having had to be replaced with other arrangements.

== See also ==
- List of works by F. X. Velarde
