= St John's Church, Trofarth =

Former church in Conwy County Borough, Wales

Coordinates: 53.2311°N 3.7131°W

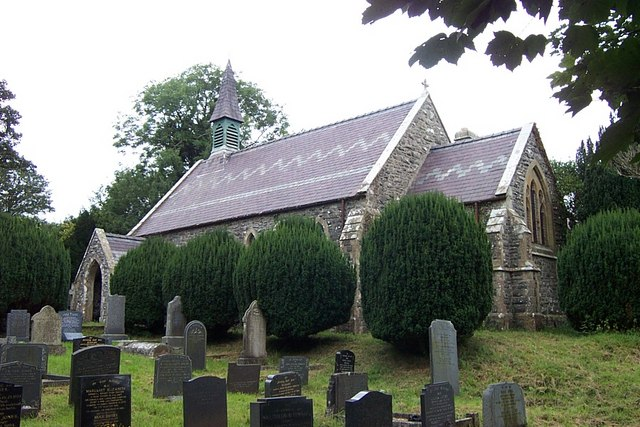
St John's Church, Trofarth, from the southeast

St John's Church, Trofarth, is a redundant church standing in an isolated position in Conwy County Borough, Wales (grid reference SH857718). It was designated as a Grade II listed building on 2 July 1998.

It was built in 1873 as an Anglican church to a design by Sir George Gilbert Scott and consecrated on 19 June that year. A small church with lancet windows, it consisted of a nave, a small chancel, a south porch and it had a bellcote at the west end. It was restored in 1899 by the Chester firm of architects, Douglas and Fordham, who added a vestry at the northeast and an organ chamber, and increased the size of the chancel by extending it into the nave. At the same time, the internal plaster was removed and replaced by a veneer of limestone, and furnishings designed by Douglas were added.

In January 2009 permission was obtained for the building to be converted for domestic use.

There is a churchyard at the west side of the redundant church. Burials include:

- Kyffin Roberts of Pentre, Betws yn Rhos - died in 1900.
- Robert Evans and his wife Anne - of Pandu, Llangernyw - died in 1890.

== See also ==
- List of church restorations, amendments and furniture by John Douglas
