= St Gabriel's Church, Blackburn =

Art Deco church by F. X. Velarde in England

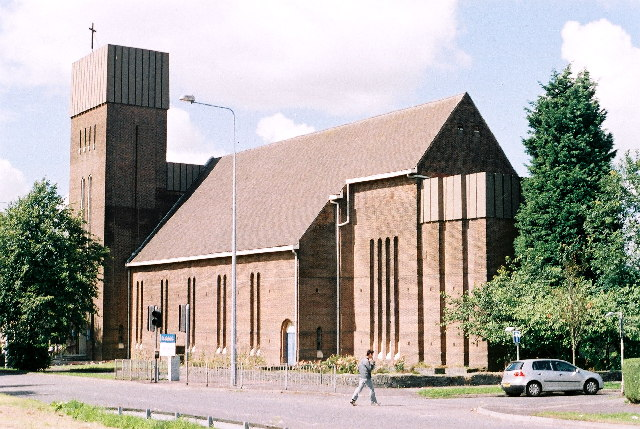
- St Gabriel's Church, Blackburn
- St Gabriel's Church, Blackburn
- 53.7748°N 2.4770°W
- OS grid reference: SD 68660 31044
- Location: Blackburn
- Country: England
- Denomination: Church of England
- Website: stgabrielsblackburn.co.uk

History
- Dedication: St Gabriel, the archangel
- Consecrated: 1933; 93 years ago: St Gabriel, Brownhill

Architecture
- Heritage designation: Formerly Grade II Listed (currently delisted)
- Architect: F. X. Velarde
- Style: Art Deco
- Completed: 1934

Administration
- Province: Lancashire
- Diocese: Diocese of Blackburn
- Deanery: Blackburn with Darwen
- Parish: St. Gabriel, Blackburn

Clergy
- Vicar: The Revd Stephen Corbett

St Gabriel's is an active English Anglican church in Blackburn, Lancashire. Designed by F. X. Velarde, St Gabriel's is regarded as a milestone in the development of Modern English ecclesiastical architecture. Constructed in the early 1930s, the building was the first Anglican place of worship designed by the architect.

== History ==
The church was constructed between 1932 and 1934 to a design by the Liverpool-born architect F. X. Velarde, at a cost of £20,000. Built on a prominent site on the outskirts of the town of Blackburn, on what is now Brownhill Drive, at the time of its construction it sat within a contemporaneous 1930s housing estate. St Gabriel's Church of England Primary School is located within walking distance away in nearby Pleckgate.

== Architecture ==
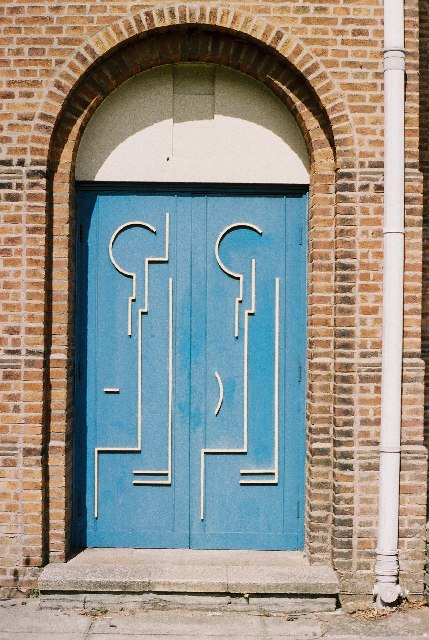
Decorated external door of Velarde’s own design at St Gabriel’s

Constructed principally of brick, with internally rendered walls, wood block floor, St Gabriel's in its original form was widely cited as Velarde's masterpiece, but a range of issues with the building have made it subject to significant alteration since its completion. It was compared at the time of completion as bringing the architecture of the modern cinema and visual language of its interior into church design. In 1969, major structural issues were discovered during the quinquennials, a five-yearly assessment of the church's fabric.

=== Interior ===
St Gabriel's had a highly decorated, polychromatic interior with chrome and stainless steel in contrast to the cream-coloured plaster of the "long tunnel nave" and spare fenestration. The fittings were designed by Velarde; a chrome reredos stood at the east end, cited as a precociously early use and adaptation of the then-new material. Between 1970 and 1971, architectural practice Grimshaw and Townsend proposed a programme of renovation and refurbishment. Approved and initiated, the works were completed in 1977. They included major structural and aesthetic alterations to the building, and changes to Velarde's original interior, resulting in the removal of the parapets, the reredos, and other original Modernist fittings. Subsequent to this, the church was removed from the National Heritage listing. The organ is by Messrs. Jardine & Co. Ltd.

=== Stained glass ===
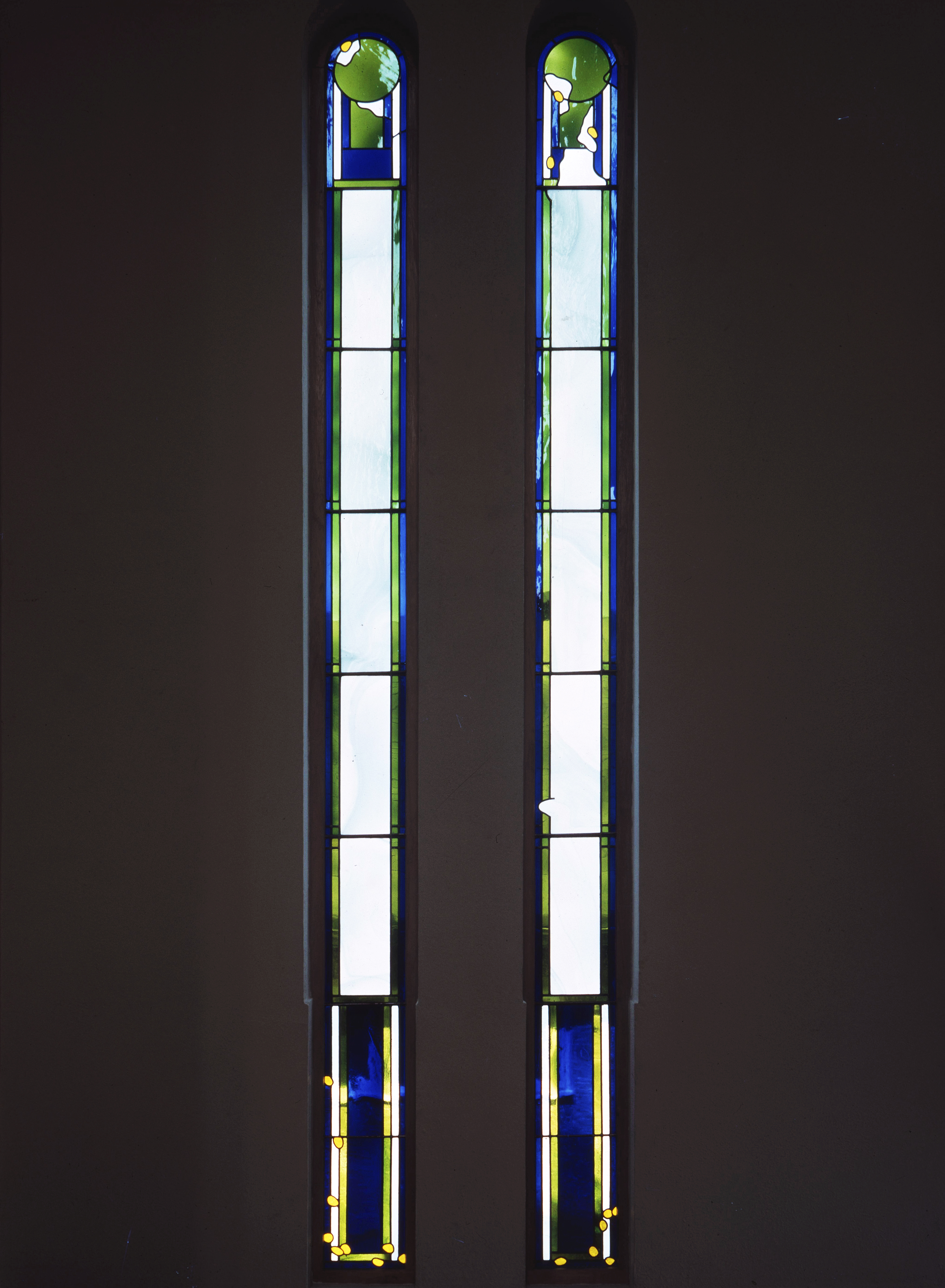
Baptistery windows designed and fabricated in 1976 by Brian Clarke for St Gabriel's.

In 1976, a pair of controversial stained glass windows, by the artist Brian Clarke, were installed into St Gabriel's. Commissioned to design stained glass for the baptistery, Clarke, then twenty-four years old, produced working studies for the slender, arched fenestration, fabricating and installing the windows himself in 1977. In 1978, Clarke and the restoration of St Gabriel's were the subject of the cover story of the journal Architectural Review with an artwork titled Velarde is Not Mocked. The windows, as part of the restoration, were designed in direct response to the architecture, making reference to elements of the original design of the building. Significant changes were made by the restoring architect to the building, and the interior and exterior elements were unsympathetically altered. Clarke's public attack on the treatment of Velarde's architecture by the restoring firm marked the end of his working in the Church of England.

== See also ==
- List of works by F. X. Velarde
