= St Mary's Church, Edmonton =

Former church in Edmonton, Middlesex, England

St Mary's Church, Edmonton, was an Anglican church in Fore Street, Upper Edmonton, Middlesex, England. It was designed by William Butterfield, consecrated in 1884 and demolished in 1957. The church was built in red brick with stone dressings. Its plan consisted of a nave, north and south aisles, and a chancel. The addition of a southwest porch was attributed to the Chester architect John Douglas.

== See also ==
- List of church restorations, amendments and furniture by John Douglas
