= Peel Hall, Cheshire =

Country house in Cheshire, England

Peel Hall
- South front

- Location within Cheshire
- 53.22243°N 2.75265°W
- Location: near Ashton Hayes, Cheshire

History
- Built: 1637
- Built for: Henry Hardware IV

Site notes
- Architectural style: Jacobean

Listed Building – Grade II*
- Official name: Peel Hall
- Designated: 22 October 1952
- Reference no.: 1130527

Peel Hall is a country house near the village of Ashton Hayes, Cheshire, England. It is recorded in the National Heritage List for England as a designated Grade II* listed building. It was built as a mansion in 1637, but was much reduced in size by 1812, and was later used as a farmhouse. It is constructed in sandstone and has slate roofs. Its architectural style is Jacobean.

== History ==
Peel Hall was built by Henry Hardware IV, a descendant of the former Lord Mayor of Chester Henry Hardware, as a three-storey manor house. In 1690 it was the location a visit by King William III of England hosted by Colonel Roger Whitley while the king was travelling en route to the Kingdom of Ireland to fight in the Battle of the Boyne. Ownership later fell into the hands of the Earls of Plymouth.

By the 1800s, the manor house had been transformed into a farmhouse with the original forty-two hearths being reduced to seventeen. In 1812, it was reduced in size with the two tier entrance hall demolished and a number of entrances blocked up. In turn it was renovated in Tuscan style. The contemporary historian George Ormerod did not like Peel Hall, stating " ...it did but ill deserve the eulogiums which have been bestowed upon it, being but an indifferent specimen of the taste which prevailed on the restoration of Italian architecture in this country".

== Description ==
Peel Hall is built in sandstone with slate roofs, and is in Jacobean style. The house has an L-shaped plan, in three storeys with a basement. It has a symmetrical five-bay south front. The doorcase has a Tuscan architrave and a fanlight. The windows are mullioned and transomed.

On the exterior, the garden wall and paddock walls are also listed at grade II.

Adjoining listed walls

Garden wall to west

Eastern wall of paddock to south

Western wall of paddock to south

== See also ==
- Grade II* listed buildings in Cheshire West and Chester
- Listed buildings in Horton cum Peel
