= St Bartholomew's Church, Barrow =

Coordinates: 53.2094°N 2.7957°W

St Bartholomew, Barrow
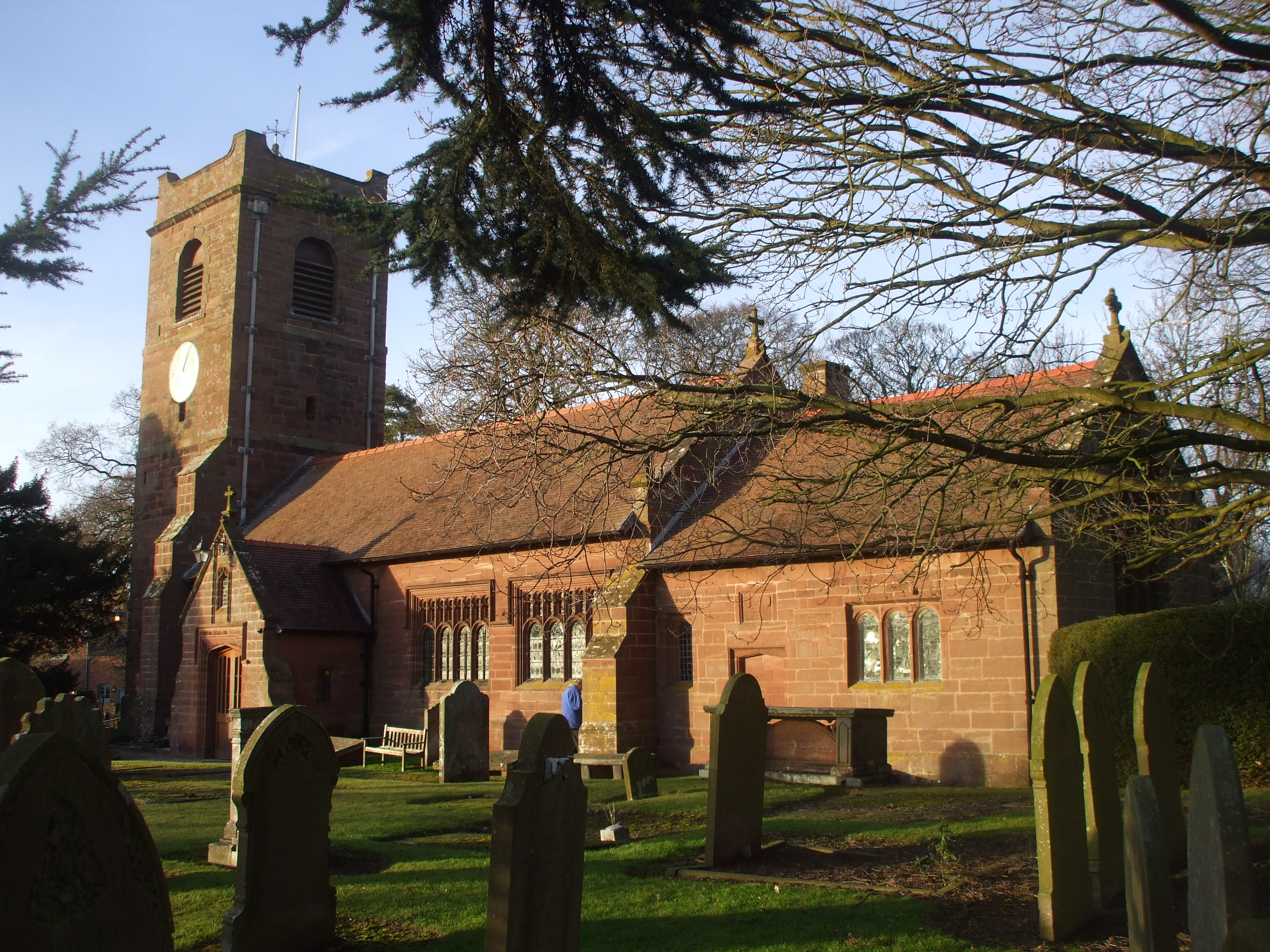
- St Bartholomew, Barrow, from the south

- Location in Cheshire
- OS grid reference: SJ 469,684
- Location: Great Barrow, Barrow, Cheshire
- Country: England
- Denomination: Anglican
- Website: St Bartholomew, Barrow

History
- Status: Parish church
- Dedication: Saint Bartholomew

Architecture
- Functional status: Active
- Heritage designation: Grade II*
- Designated: 1 June 1967
- Architect: John Douglas (restorations)
- Architectural type: Church
- Style: Gothic, Gothic Revival
- Completed: 1883

Specifications
- Materials: Red sandstone Red tile roof

Administration
- Province: York
- Diocese: Chester
- Archdeaconry: Chester
- Deanery: Chester
- Parish: Barrow

Clergy
- Rector: Revd Andy Stinson

St Bartholomew's Church is in the village of Great Barrow in the civil parish of Barrow, Cheshire, England. It is recorded in the National Heritage List for England as a designated Grade II* listed building. It is an active Anglican parish church in the diocese of Chester, the archdeaconry of Chester and the deanery of Chester.

== History ==
A church has been present on this site since at least the reign of Henry II when it was given by Robert de Bachepuz to the Knights Hospitallers of St John who had a preceptory here. It became a parish church during the reign of Queen Elizabeth I. The chancel was built in 1671 for Dean Bridgeman and the tower is dated 1744. By the 18th and early 19th centuries the church was in a poor condition. A limited restoration was carried out in 1871 by John Douglas, who performed a more substantial scheme in 1883.

== Architecture ==
=== Exterior ===
The church is built in red sandstone ashlar with a red tile roof. There is some medieval stone work in the north aisle. The church consists of a four-bay nave with a north aisle, a south porch and a three-bay chancel. The four-stage tower is at the west end, with a clock in its third stage. Two lead down spouts are inscribed with the date 1744. The roof of the chancel is hammer beam and the ends of the hammers bear the arms of Dean Bridgeman.

=== Interior ===
In the church is an octagonal sandstone font with a lead bowl dated 1713. The stained glass in the east window of the chancel and the east window of the north aisle is by Kempe. In the tower is an early Georgian chest dated 1718. In the church are charity boards dated 1711, 1725 and 1848. A monument to a Mrs Wallis who died in 1848 is by T. and E. Gaffin and depicts an angel kneeling by an urn. The parish registers begin in 1572, with a gap between 1679 and 1681. The churchwardens' accounts begin in 1857. The single bell bears the date 1767 and was probably cast by Rudhall of Gloucester. The two-manual organ was built by Binns.

== External features ==
The tower was formerly decorated with urns but these were considered to be dangerous and were removed in 1929. They are now placed outside the church at the foot of the tower. In the church yard is a sandstone sundial. It consists of a square base of two steps with a socket containing a slightly tapering octagonal shaft and a cap of buff sandstone. The base and the shaft were originally part of a cross dating from the early 15th century. The cap was added later together with a small square plate inscribed with the date 1705. The plate is now missing. The sundial is listed at Grade II, and is a scheduled monument. Also listed at Grade II are the gates of the churchyard, their overthrow and the gate piers. The churchyard also contains the war graves of four soldiers of World War I.

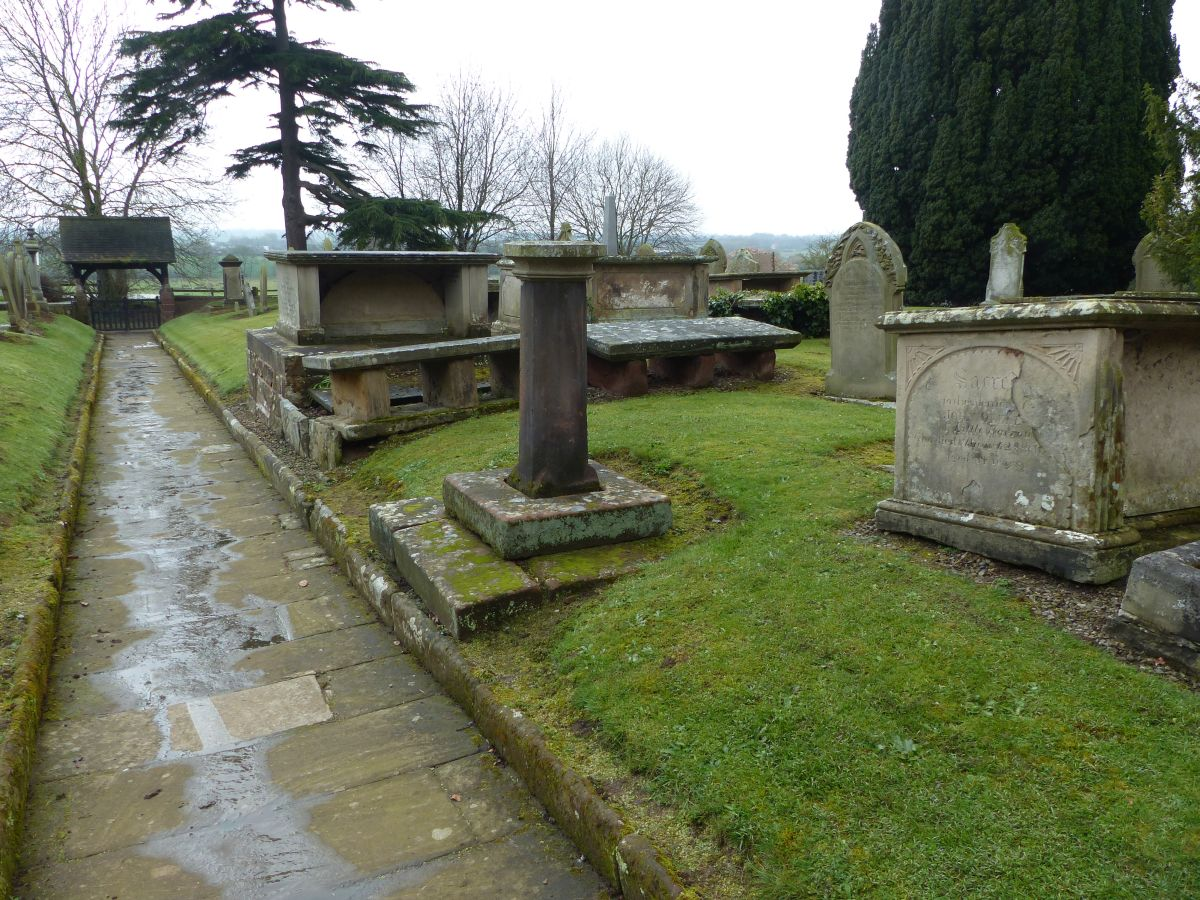
Sundial

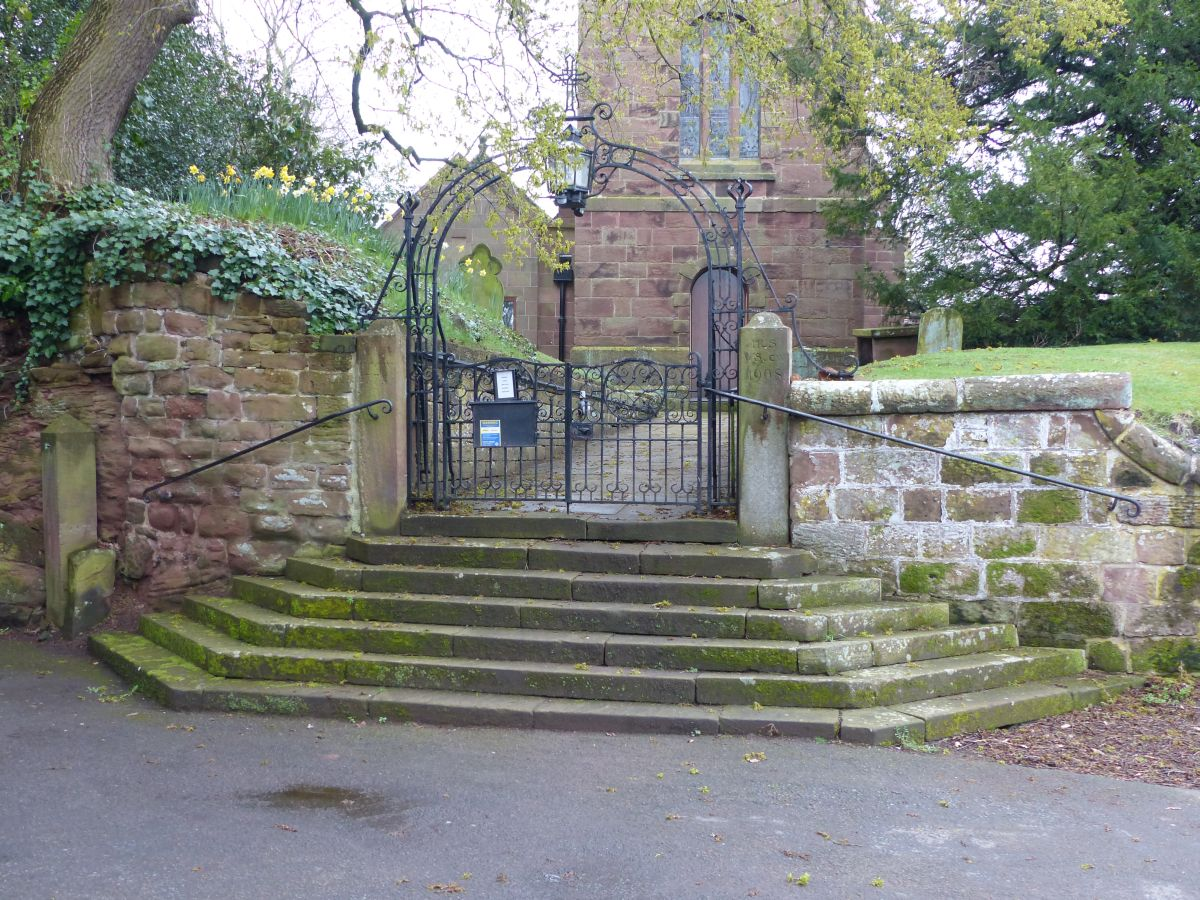
Gates and overthrow

== See also ==
- Listed buildings in Barrow, Cheshire
- List of church restorations, amendments and furniture by John Douglas
