= St Dunawd's Church =

Coordinates: 53.0025°N 2.9123°W

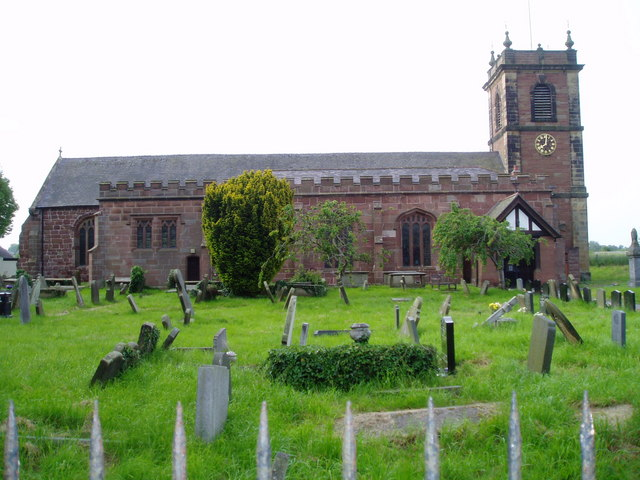
- St Dunawd's Church in Bangor-on-Dee
- St Dunawd's Church
- OS grid reference: SJ 388,454
- Location: Bangor-on-Dee, Wrexham County Borough
- Country: Wales
- Denomination: Anglican

History
- Dedication: St Dunawd

Architecture
- Functional status: Active
- Heritage designation: Grade II*
- Architect(s): Richard Trubshaw, John Douglas
- Architectural type: Church
- Completed: 1913

Specifications
- Materials: Brick and stone

Administration
- Province: Church in Wales
- Diocese: St Asaph
- Archdeaconry: Wrexham
- Deanery: Dee Valley
- Parish: Bangor Monachorum, Worthenbury and Marchwiel

St Dunawd's Church, is in the village of Bangor-on-Dee, Wrexham County Borough, Wales. It is designated by Cadw as a Grade II* listed building. The church is an active Anglican church in the deanery of Dee Valley, the archdeaconry of Wrexham and the diocese of St Asaph.

== History ==
The church is built on the site of a monastery which was established about 560 by St Dunawd, the first abbot of the monastery. The monastery was destroyed in about 616 by Æthelfrith of Northumbria when 1,200 monks were killed and only 50 escaped. No trace of this monastery exists.

In about 1300 a sandstone church was built on the site of the monastery. The chancel from this building is still extant. The church was restored between 1723 and 1726 by Richard Trubshaw; this restoration included the bell tower. The north aisle was altered in 1832. The architect John Douglas was married in the church in 1860 and in 1868 he carried out a restoration of the church. This included the extension of the south aisle to form a baptistery and restoration of the chancel. Douglas carried out a further restoration in 1877 which included the addition of a half-timbered porch. In 1913 the vestry was built and the organ was repositioned.

== Architecture, furniture and fittings ==
The tower is built in brick and stone. It has round-headed bell-openings and urn-like finials. The chancel has a five-light east window dating from the 14th century, and a two-light window on the south wall of the chancel. The north aisle, dating from 1832, has Perpendicular style windows.

Internally, the stalls and rails date from 1868, while the pews and pulpit were added in 1877. The pulpit is carved with pierced tracery panels and sunflower patterns. Douglas' organ screen was resited in 1913. The font cover was designed by Evelyn Wybergh. The former reredos dating from 1725 is now at the west end of the church. The brass lectern commemorates three brothers who died in the First World War.

There is a ring of six bells. Four of these were cast in 1727 by Abraham Rudhall II, one was cast in 1811 by John Rudhall and the sixth was cast in 1865 by Mears and Stainbank.

== External features ==
The churchyard contains six war grave burials registered by the Commonwealth War Graves Commission; five from World War I, including 3 brothers of the Ormrod family, and an officer of the King's Shropshire Light Infantry of World War II.

== See also ==
- List of church restorations, amendments and furniture by John Douglas
