= Listed buildings in Barrow, Cheshire =

Barrow is a civil parish in Cheshire West and Chester, England. It contains 13 buildings that are recorded in the National Heritage List for England as designated listed buildings. Other than the settlements of Great Barrow and Little Barrow, the parish is entirely rural. Apart from the church, a sundial, and a war memorial, all the listed buildings are domestic or related to farming.

== Key ==
Grade	Criteria
Grade II*	Particularly important buildings of more than special interest.
Grade II	Buildings of national importance and special interest.

== Buildings ==
Name and location	Photograph	Date	Notes	Grade
Sundial; 53.20917°N 2.79587°W		Medieval (probable)	The sundial consists of a slightly tapering octagonal sandstone shaft, which is probably medieval, standing on square base of two steps. It carried a cap containing a brass plate whose inscription includes the date 1705. The base and shaft probably belonged to a churchyard cross that was broken in 1619. The structure is a scheduled monument.	II
The White House; 53.2096°N 2.7910°W		Early 17th century	Most of the house dates from the 18th century, with later alterations and additions. It is constructed partly in timber framing, and partly in whitewashed brick; it has a slate roof. The front of the house is in four bays. On the left is a single-storey timber-framed bay; the rest is in three storeys. The windows are casements.	II
St Bartholomew's Church; 53.2094°N 2.7958°W		1671	The chancel was built in 1671, and the tower is dated 1744. In 1871 John Douglas carried out a limited restoration, followed by a more substantial scheme in 1883. The church is constructed in sandstone with tiled roofs, and consists of a nave, a north aisle, a south porch, a chancel, and a west tower.	II*
Barrow Hall; 53.2111°N 2.7929°W	—	Late 17th century	Additions and alterations were carried out in the following century, and later. The building consists of a farmhouse and an attached cottage, the former in three storeys, the latter in two. It is constructed in brick with slate roofs. The three-storey portion is symmetrical with a three-bay, the central bay being flanked by pilasters, and has a pediment. The other portion has four bays. The windows are casements.	II
Bridgewater House; 53.2106°N 2.7950°W	—	Late 17th century	Additions were made to the house in the 18th century. It is constructed in grey-chip and rendered stone and has a slate roof. The house has two storeys, and an almost symmetrical three-bay front. There is a central porch, the lateral bays containing sash windows. Inside is a restored inglenook and a dog-leg staircase.	II
Old Rectory; 53.2096°N 2.7949°W		1696	An extra storey and a wing were added to the former rectory in about 1865. It is constructed in brick with a slate roof, and has an L-shaped plan. The main wing is in three storeys, with a four-bay front containing a two-storey gabled porch and casement windows. The added wing is in two storeys, and has a two-storey canted bay window.	II
Two cottages 53.2100°N 2.7939°W		1718	These originated as a single farmhouse, later converted into two cottages. They are constructed in brick with slate roofs, and have two storeys. The front is in five-bays, with a two-storey gabled porch, and a doorway inserted in the 20th century. The windows are casements.	II
Long Green Farmhouse; 53.2279°N 2.7875°W	—	c. 1720	The farmhouse was extended in the late 18th century. It is in brick with a slate roof. The farmhouse has two storeys, and a five-bay front with a two-storey gabled porch. The windows are casements.	II
Farm building, Barrow Hall; 53.2108°N 2.7925°W	—	Early to mid-18th century	This is an L-shaped farm building constructed partly in stone and partly in brick with a slate roof. Both ranges are in two storeys, the north range having fourteen bays, and the west range eight bays. Features include casement windows, square pitch holes, and X-shaped ventilators.	II
Little Barrow Hall; 53.2251°N 2.7965°W		Mid-18th century	A long rectangular house, originally a farmhouse, in brick with a slate roof. It is in two storeys, and has a four-bay front. The windows are 20th-century sashes.	II
Gates, overthrow and gate piers 53.20953°N 2.79615°W		1775	Sited at the entrance to the churchyard of St Bartholomew's Church, one of the gate piers is dated 1775; the other pier and the overthrow are dated 1908. The piers are in sandstone, and the rest is wrought iron. The piers are plain with domed caps, and the overthrow contains a lantern surmounted by a cross.	II
Farm building, Barrow Hall; 53.2111°N 2.7926°W	—	Early to mid-19th century	The farm building is in two storeys with a slate roof. The lower storey is in sandstone, and the upper storey is in brick. Its south front has five bays. The windows are casements, with a gabled dormer in the upper storey. To the rear is a later extension containing a water tank with brick castellations.	II
War memorial 53.20908°N 2.79587°W		1920	The war memorial is near the entrance to the churchyard of St Bartholomew's Church. It is in sandstone, and consists of a wheel-head cross in Celtic style about 4 metres (13 ft) high. The wheel-head has interlace decoration with leaf motifs, and has a tapering shaft, also with leaf decoration. The shaft is on a square plinth on a base of two octagonal steps. On the plinth are bronze plaques with inscriptions, including the names of those lost in both World Wars.	II

== See also ==
- Listed buildings in Ashton Hayes
- Listed buildings in Christleton
- Listed buildings in Dunham on the Hill
- Listed buildings in Guilden Sutton
- Listed buildings in Hapsford
- Listed buildings in Horton cum Peel
- Listed buildings in Manley
- Listed buildings in Mickle Trafford
- Listed buildings in Mouldsworth
- Listed buildings in Tarvin
