= Barrow Hall, Cheshire =

Country house in Great Barrow, Cheshire, England

Coordinates: 53.2110°N 2.7929°W

Barrow Hall is in the village of Great Barrow, in the civil parish of Barrow, Cheshire, England. It is recorded in the National Heritage List for England as a designated Grade II listed building.

The building dates from the late 17th and the 18th centuries, with later additions. It is constructed in brick with a slate roof, and consists of a two and three-storey house with an attached cottage. There is a three-storey gabled porch to the rear. The front of the building is in seven bays. The windows are casements.

== See also ==
- Listed buildings in Barrow, Cheshire
