= English Martyrs' Church, Wallasey =

Coordinates: 53.4243°N 3.0634°W

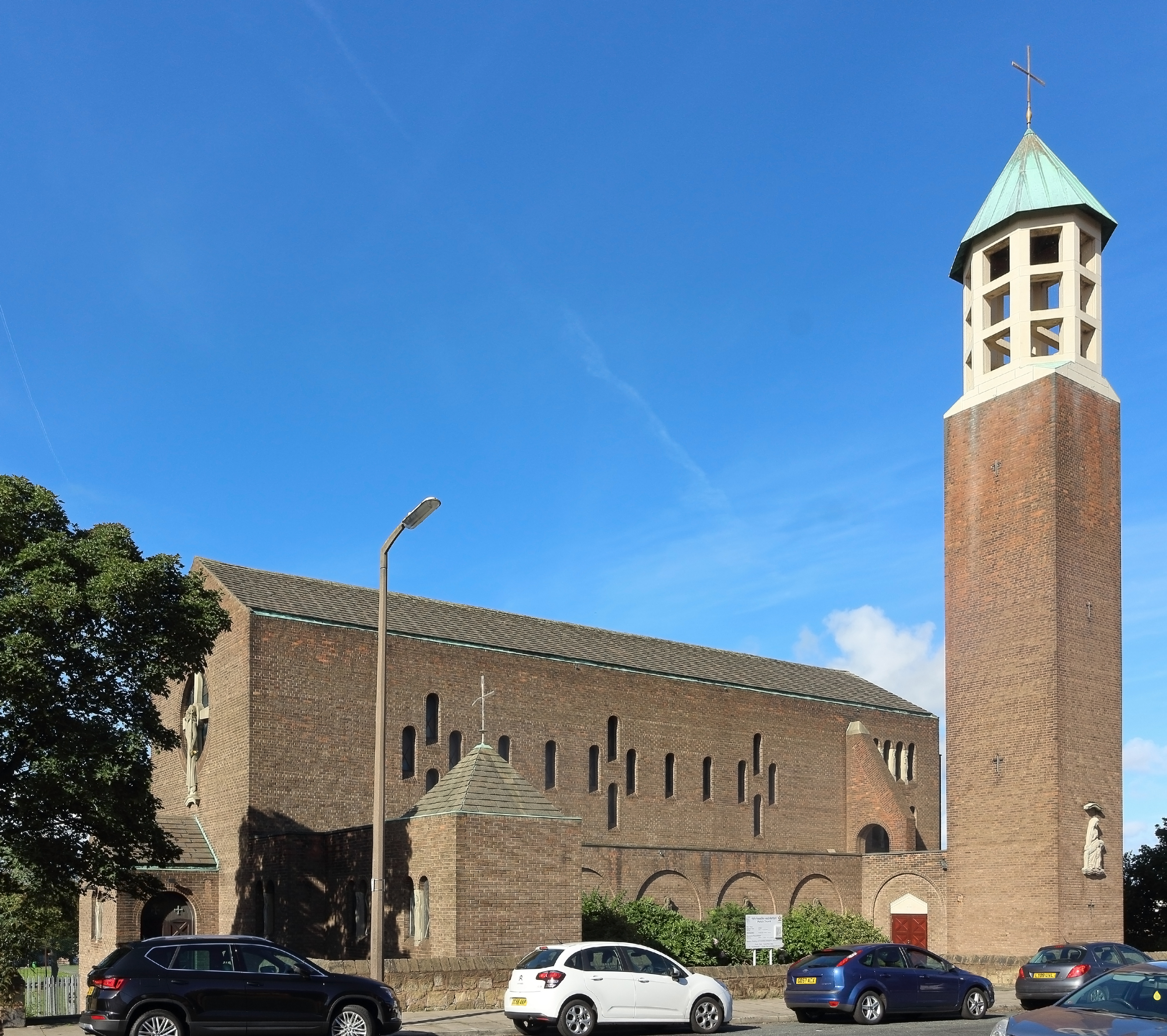

- Location in Merseyside
- OS grid reference: SJ 294 925
- Location: St George's Road, Wallasey, Wirral, Merseyside
- Country: England
- Denomination: Roman Catholic

Architecture
- Functional status: Active
- Heritage designation: Grade II*
- Designated: 30 June 2003
- Architect: F. X. Velarde
- Architectural type: Church
- Style: Neo-Romanesque
- Groundbreaking: 1952
- Completed: 1953
- Construction cost: £50,000

Specifications
- Materials: Brick; decoration in cast stone; tiled roofs

Administration
- Diocese: Shrewsbury

English Martyrs' Church is in St George's Road, Wallasey, Wirral, Merseyside, England. It is an active Roman Catholic church in the diocese of Shrewsbury. The church is recorded in the National Heritage List for England as a designated Grade II* listed building.

== History ==
The church originated as the daughter church of Saints Peter and Paul, New Brighton, and a temporary iron church was opened in 1907. Between 1933 and 1941 £12,000 was raised towards the building of a permanent church. Plans for the new church were designed by F. X. Velarde before the Second World War, but the foundation stone was not laid until 4 March 1952. The church was opened on 31 August 1953. The main contractor for the building was Tyson's, and the construction of the church cost £50,000.

== Architecture ==
=== Exterior ===
English Martyrs is built in brown brick with decoration in cast stone, and with tiled roofs. Its architectural style is Neo-Romanesque. The church is orientated approximately north-south, (Note: In the description, the conventional liturgical orientation is used, the altar being placed at the liturgical east end.) and consists of a nave and a sanctuary under a single roof. There are narrow flat-roofed aisles at the sides, a clerestory, and at the east end is a curved apse. There is a flat-roofed Lady Chapel at the east end of the south aisle. At the east end of the north aisle is a wing containing a choir gallery and the sacristy. At the southeast corner of the church is an attached campanile containing an entrance porch. On the southeast corner is another entrance porch and a baptistry. On the wall of the south aisle there are five blind arches, each containing the statue of an English Martyr. In the clerestory are round-headed windows arranged in the shape of two crosses, with two windows between them. The baptistry has a pyramidal roof with a cross. On the east and west sides of the baptistry are two-light round-headed windows, with a mullion formed by a cast-stone angel. The campanile has a cast-stone Pietà on its south side, and on its summit is an octagonal cast-stone lantern with a copper pyramidal roof surmounted by a cross. There are flying buttresses at the point of division of the nave and sanctuary. The Lady Chapel has a four-light round-headed window with a mullion in the form of an angel, and there are two tiers of similar windows in the sanctuary. On the north side of the church, there are three blind round-headed arches, and clerestory windows similar to those on the south side. The sacristy is gabled and in two storeys. At the west end of the church is a single-storey gabled porch. Above this is a large round window containing a cast-stone cross and a relief of Christ. The cast stone statues on the exterior of the church are by Philip Lindsey Clark.

=== Interior ===
Inside the church the brick walls have been left bare. The seven-bay arcades with round arches are carried on reinforced concrete columns. The columns are decorated with pairs of silver-coloured spiral bands, and have capitals with silver crowns and crosses. The nave roof is wooden, it has a flat centre and angled sides, the latter being decorated with zig-zags and painted mainly in orange and cream. In the aisles are relief panels painted in silver with the Stations of the Cross. The aisle roofs are painted in orange with silver crosses. There is a large round-headed arch between the nave and the sanctuary. The high altar stands on an oval concrete base, and has a relief painting in silver of an angel offering a chalice. In the apse is a large pyramidal reredos with the heads of the Twelve Apostles and Christ in relief. In the Lady Chapel is an altar with a statue by Herbert Tyson Smith of the Virgin Mary with St John Fisher. The baptistry contains a stone font, also by Herbert Tyson Smith, on a marble base. The font has a pyramidal cover with a cross finial. The baptistry roof is painted in orange with a diamond pattern in blue and white.

== Appraisal ==
The church was designated as a listed building on 30 July 2003. It is listed at Grade II*, which is the middle of the three grades, and includes "particularly important buildings of more than special interest". In the reasons for listing, it is noted that Velarde's practice is "admired for its ecclesiastical designs, especially for Catholic churches", and that English Martyrs' is "one of his finest post-war churches". In discussing this church, Pollard and Pevsner in the Buildings of England series state that Velarde "packed a powerful religious charge into his churches".

== See also ==
- Grade II* listed buildings in Merseyside
- Listed buildings in Wallasey

== Notes and references ==
Notes

Citations
