= Barrow, Cheshire =

Civil parish in Cheshire, England

Coordinates: 53.211°N 2.795°W

Barrow
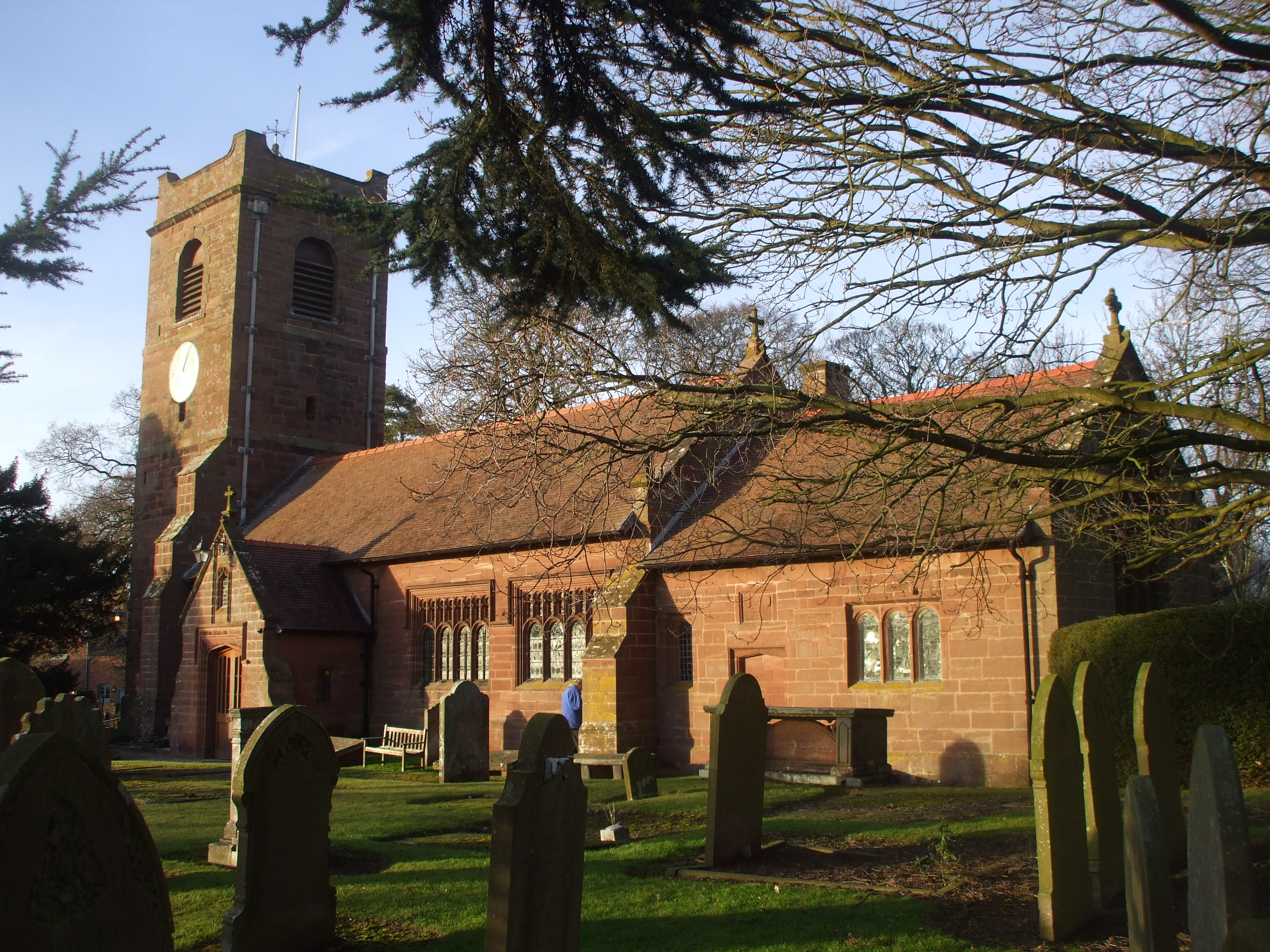
- St. Bartholomew's Church, Barrow

- Location within Cheshire
- Population: 941 (2011 census)
- OS grid reference: SJ469685
- Civil parish: Barrow
- Unitary authority: Cheshire West and Chester
- Ceremonial county: Cheshire
- Region: North West
- Country: England
- Sovereign state: United Kingdom
- Post town: CHESTER
- Postcode district: CH3
- Dialling code: 01829
- Police: Cheshire
- Fire: Cheshire
- Ambulance: North West
- UK Parliament: Runcorn and Helsby
- Website: www.greatbarrow.com

Barrow is a civil parish, in the unitary authority of Cheshire West and Chester and the ceremonial county of Cheshire, England. The civil parish contains the village of Great Barrow and the hamlets of Little Barrow, Broomhill and Stamford Bridge. Great Barrow is situated about 4.5 miles (7 kilometres) east-north-east of Chester, 6 miles (10 kilometres) north-west of Tarporley and 6 miles (10 kilometres) south of Frodsham.

At the time of the 2001 census the population was 943, reducing marginally to 941 by the 2011 census.

The name Barrow derives from the Old English bearu (a grove, or small wooded area)

Little Barrow had a station on the Mid-Cheshire line, named Barrow for Tarvin, which closed in 1953. The former Railway pub at Little Barrow is now the Foxcote tearoom, while Great Barrow retains its pub, the White Horse, which also provides accommodation. The Stamford Bridge Country Inn is near the A51 road, close to the River Gowy.

Barrow Cricket Club has two Saturday teams and a junior section. The 1st XI play in the Cheshire County Cricket League Division Two, and the 2nd XI plays in the UK Fast League Division B West.

The Barrow Buzzards are an informal group of runners who have been meeting every Saturday at 10am since 2020, for a friendly 5k. Both off- and on-road routes are available. Many walk or run a shorter or longer distance. After the run, refreshments are provided.

== See also ==
- Listed buildings in Barrow, Cheshire
- St Bartholomew's Church, Barrow
- Barrow Hall
