= St Mark's Church, Blackpool =

St Mark's Church, Layton, Blackpool
- Location within Blackpool
- 53°49′51.96″N 3°1′51.74″W
- OS grid reference: SD 32238 37695
- Location: Blackpool
- Country: England
- Denomination: Church of England

History
- Dedication: St Mark
- Consecrated: 27 September 1927

Architecture
- Architect: E. E. Dennis
- Groundbreaking: 1925
- Completed: 1927

Administration
- Diocese: Diocese of Blackburn
- Archdeaconry: Lancaster
- Deanery: Blackpool
- Parish: St Mark's Layton and St Luke's Staining

The Parish Church of St. Mark, Layton, Lancashire, England was built in 1927. The building is home to a Church of England Christian community. St.Mark's is a young church compared to many other churches, but has close links with local history because Layton Village was mentioned in the Norman Era 1066-1154 AD.

== History ==
The Rev. E.T. Williams and the architect Mr E.E Dennis designed the church featuring the strong designs of Norman Architecture. Construction began In 1925 using Rainhill Sandstone red brick. This is the same material as used to build Liverpool Anglican Cathedral. The builders, J.R Fielding & Sons had the services of Mr Tom Roberts, master stonemason and wood-carver Mr J.R Bell. The building was completed in time for the newly enthroned Bishop of Blackburn, Dr. Percy Herbert, to consecrate the Church of St Mark, Layton on 27 September 1927. Tom Roberts fixed 9,000 cubic feet of stone in addition to the carvings seen particularly in the Sanctuary and the carvings of J. R. Bell.

== Organ ==
The church contains a pipe organ by Ernest Walklet. Costing £430, it was opened on 29 March 1934 by Frank Rawes of Poulton Parish Church. A specification of the organ can be found on the National Pipe Organ Register.

== Congregation ==
It is informally known in Layton, as "The Church on The Hill". It is an Anglican church seeking to be faithful to God in Word, Spirit, Service and Life. As a Christian community serving in the villages of Layton, Grange Park & Little Carleton it exists to welcome all to share new life through faith in Jesus Christ. Its "Mission" is to be a growing, all age Christ Centred Community:

- Growing upwards towards God through renewed worship and Bible teaching
- Growing together as a united congregation based on caring cell groups
- Growing outwards into the local community and beyond, sharing the love of Christ through evangelism and service

St Mark's belongs to the Church of England Diocese of Blackburn. On a local level it also belongs to two particular support groups of churches:

- THE 5ACT GROUP: made up of 5 Anglican Parishes in Blackpool which are committed to working together for mutual support and joint mission: St Mark's, St Thomas' St John's, St Luke's and Christ Church With All Saints. In addition, it is formally partnered with St Luke's Church of England, Staining for joint services and shared role of Vicar.
- CHURCHES TOGETHER (LAYTON): made up of the main denominations in the area (Anglican, Roman Catholic, Methodist and United Reformed Church).
