= Church of St Monica, Bootle =

Coordinates: 53.454°N 2.980°W

St Monica's, Bootle
- Church of St Monica, Fernhill Road
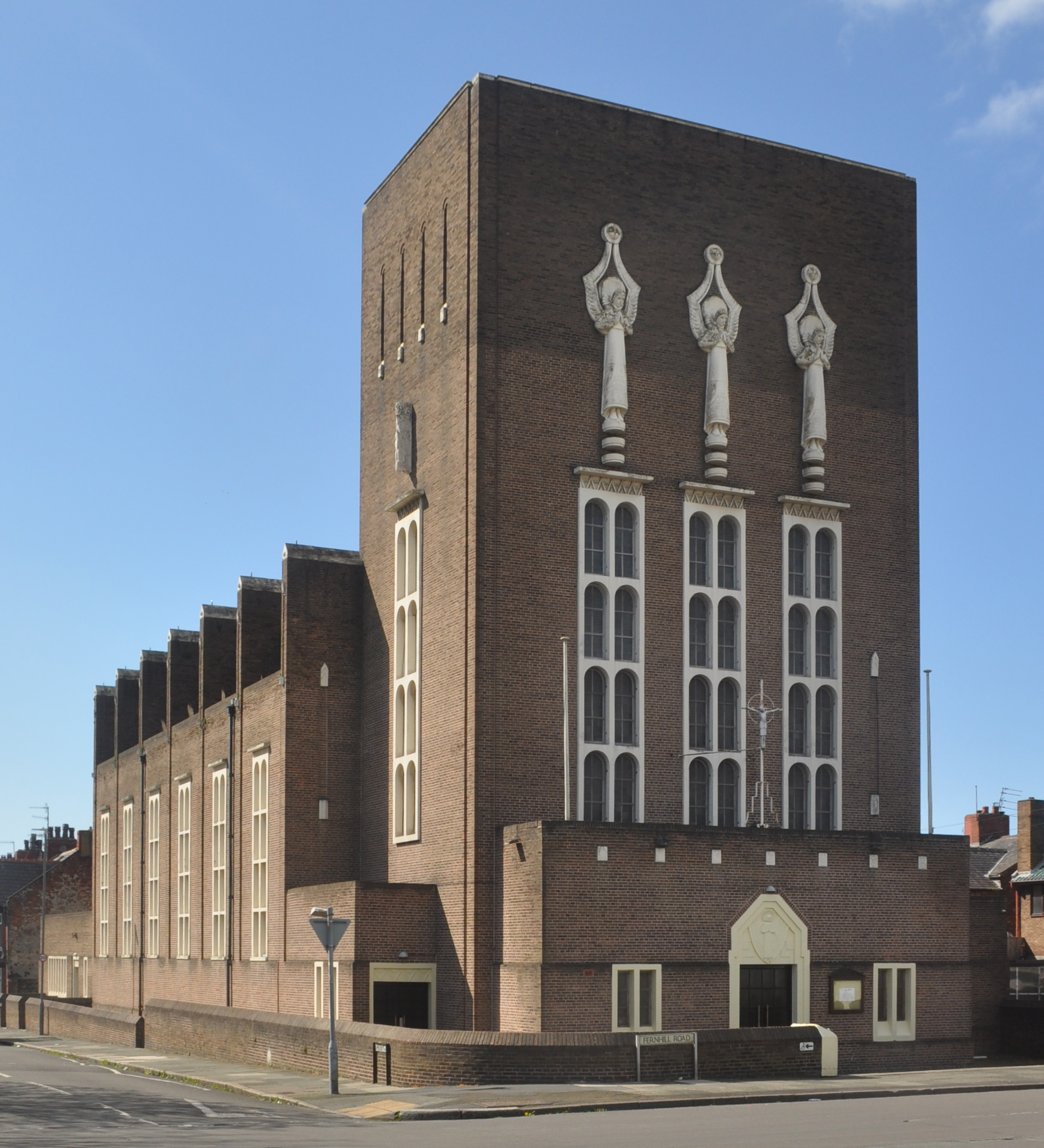
- The church in 2024
- St Monica's, Bootle
- OS grid reference: SJ 35034 95685
- Location: Bootle
- Country: England
- Denomination: Roman Catholic

Architecture
- Architect: F. X. Velarde

Administration
- Archdiocese: Archdiocese of Liverpool

St. Monica's is a Roman Catholic parish church in Bootle, Merseyside. The church building was designed by the architect F. X. Velarde. Construction was started in 1930 and completed in 1936, and the church was dedicated by Archbishop Richard Downey on 4 October that year. It is a brick structure with a green glaze pantile roof, and is a Grade I listed building. The church is inspired by German churches of the 1930s. Three sculptures of angels were sculpted by H. Tyson Smith. Other sculptures include winged creatures. The current priest is Father Ged Callacher who has been at the church since 2019 after he succeeded Father Pat Sexton.

== See also ==
- Listed buildings in Bootle
- List of works by F. X. Velarde
