= Shrine of Our Lady of Lourdes, Blackpool =

Shrine of Our Lady of Lourdes
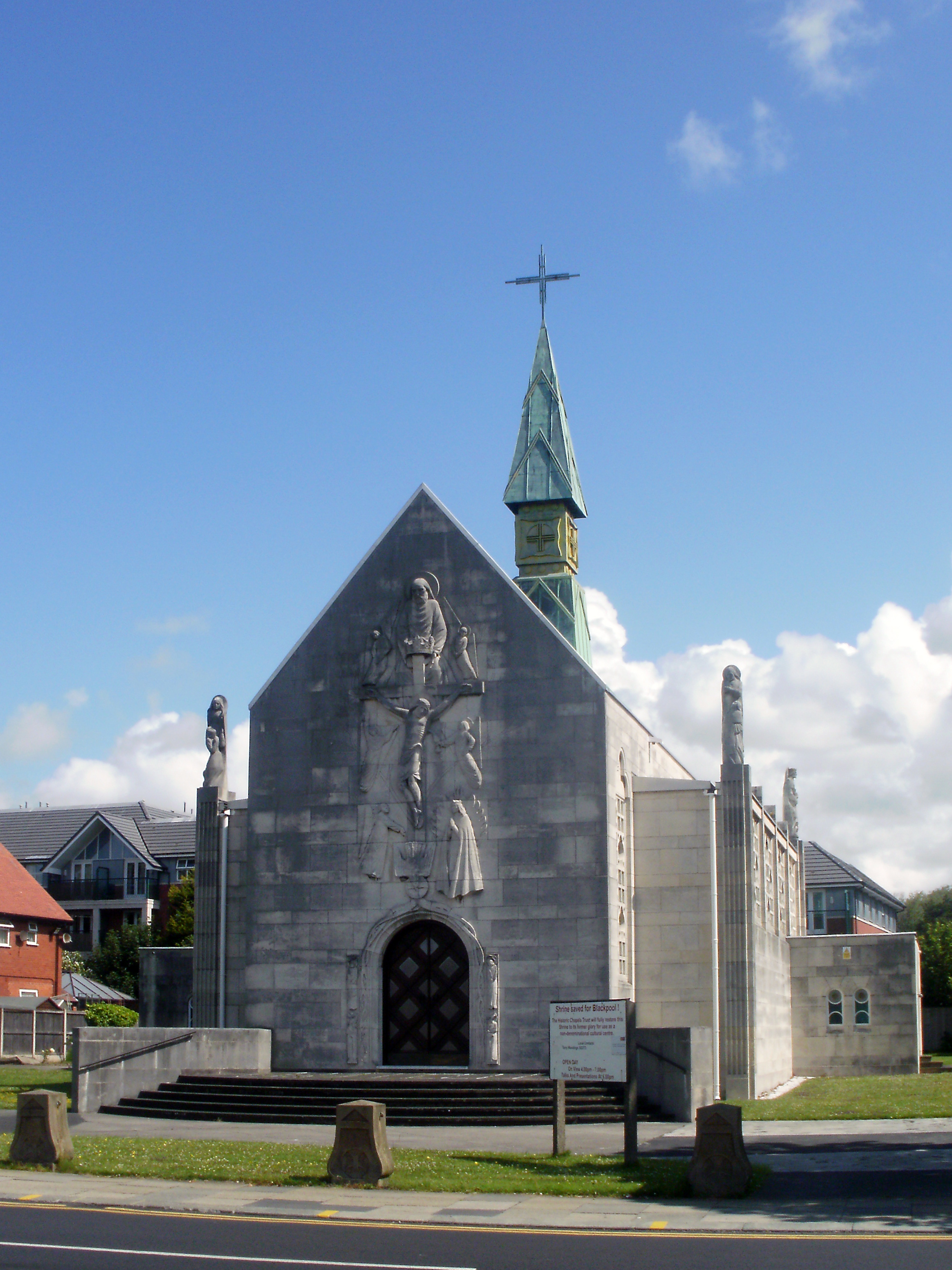

- Location within Blackpool

General information
- Type: Shrine
- Location: Whinney Heys Road, Blackpool, Lancashire, England
- Coordinates: 53.8229°N 3.0165°W
- Construction started: 1955
- Completed: 1957
- Renovated: 2008
- Cost: £50,000 (equivalent to £1,050,000 in 2025),
- Renovation cost: £650,000 (estimated)
- Owner: Historic Chapels Trust

Design and construction
- Architect: Francis Xavier Velarde

Website
- Historic Chapels Trust

Listed Building – Grade II*
- Official name: Thanksgiving Shrine of Our Lady of Lourdes
- Designated: 30 June 1999
- Reference no.: 1387319

The Shrine of Our Lady of Lourdes, Blackpool, stands in Whinney Heys Road, Blackpool, Lancashire, England (grid reference SD332368). It is recorded in the National Heritage List for England as a designated Grade II* listed building, and now owned by Historic Chapels Trust. Locally it is simply known as 'The Shrine' or the 'Bishop's folly'. The 'White Church' is another Church building in Ansdell.

== History ==
The Blackpool shrine was built between 1955 and 1957 to a design by F. X. Velarde. During the Second World War Bishop Thomas E. Flynn, the bishop of the Roman Catholic Diocese of Lancaster, prayed to Our Lady of Lourdes, the patron saint of the diocese, to protect the diocese from war damage. By the end of the war, Blackpool was indeed relatively undamaged, and the bishop conceived the idea of building a thanksgiving chapel to commemorate this. It cost £50,000 (equivalent to £1,050,000 in 2025), and many of the parishes in the diocese made a subscription. The land on which it is sited was given by William Eaves, a local builder, who left the plot of land between the Shrine and the Whinney Hays roundabout undeveloped to give the Shrine prominence on that approach to the town. Until the 1990s the Shrine was looked after by successive orders of Roman Catholic monks and nuns, among them the nuns of the Congregation of Adoration of Marie Reparatrice, and the Blessed Sacrament Fathers.

== Architecture ==
The chapel is constructed in brick and concrete with a Portland stone covering and has copper cladding to the roof and flèche. The wide nave has four bays. At the west end there is a single-bay narthex, and at the east end is an apse forming the sanctuary, and projecting vestries. In the west front are double doors, over which is a low relief of the Holy Trinity carved by David John. David John also designed the pinnacles at the corners of the building; these depict Our Lady of Lourdes appearing to Saint Bernadette, Christ appearing to Saint Margaret Mary, Saint Thomas of Canterbury, and Saint Edward the Confessor. On the sides rectangular panels of cast concrete glazing are filled with geometric patterns, their pink and pale blue glass giving good light to the interior. At the entrance to the building are York stone steps with splayed flanking walls. The interior arcades columns are clad in gold mosaic. The ceiling is coloured blue, red and gold, with deep coffering around the light fittings and the floor of the body of the shrine is tiled. The sanctuary is raised and approached on marble steps through a round arch; its floor is travertine with mosaic panels. The altar rails are bronze with an Art Deco design. The altar reredos was carved by David John.

== Repair and future use ==
The shrine was deconsecrated in 1993, and passed into the ownership of the Historic Chapels Trust, a secular charity, in 2000, in a poor state and without an endowment. A £100,000 grant awarded by English Heritage assisted with urgent rescue repairs, completed in April 2008, dealing with the leaking copper roof and improving the rainwater disposal system. A larger sum will be needed to convert the building into a community centre and current fund-raising is focussed on re-installing electrical supplies, rendered unsafe by water ingress, and modern facilities. The Historic Chapels Trust is actively seeking partners to use the space for events once repairs are complete.

== See also ==
- Grade II* listed buildings in Lancashire
- List of works by F. X. Velarde
- List of chapels preserved by the Historic Chapels Trust
