= Mouldsworth =

Village in Cheshire, England

Coordinates: 53.23616°N 2.73354°W

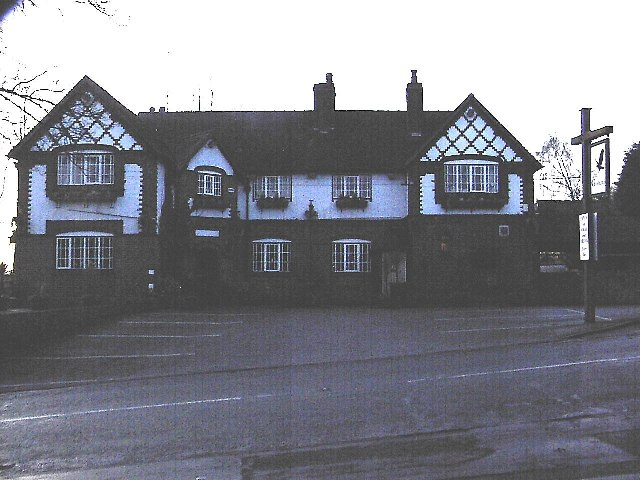
- The Goshawk public house, Mouldsworth

- Location within Cheshire
- Population: 327 (2011 Census)
- OS grid reference: SJ511712
- Civil parish: Mouldsworth
- Unitary authority: Cheshire West and Chester
- Ceremonial county: Cheshire
- Region: North West
- Country: England
- Sovereign state: United Kingdom
- Post town: CHESTER
- Postcode district: CH3
- Dialling code: 01928
- Police: Cheshire
- Fire: Cheshire
- Ambulance: North West
- UK Parliament: Runcorn and Helsby
- Website: Mouldsworth Parish Council website

Mouldsworth is a small rural village and civil parish set within the Cheshire countryside near Chester in the unitary authority of Cheshire West and Chester and the ceremonial county of Cheshire, England. It is about 8 miles north east of Chester city centre on the B5393 road and lies within the Cheshire green belt area. It is characterised by a predominantly low-density, linear form, closely connected to its surrounding farmland and rural landscape. The nearest villages are Manley to the north west and Ashton Hayes to the south west. Delamere Forest is situated 2 miles to the east of the village and is within easy walking distance. At the 2001 Census the population was recorded at 302, increasing slightly to 327 at the 2011 Census.

Mouldsworth railway station is on the Mid-Cheshire Line, a non-electrified line with diesel locomotive services between Chester and Manchester Piccadilly.

There is a public house called the Goshawk, formerly the Station Hotel, in the centre of the village opposite the station. There are references to the Station Hotel and its bowling green with magnificent views as far back as 1891. There is also a unisex hairdressers, called Whistles, located in the railway's old ticket office. Sights include the former Mouldsworth Motor Museum. This was founded in 1971 and was housed in a 1930s Art Deco building, formerly a water-softening plant. The museum closed in 2013.

Mouldsworth is west of Delamere Forest, in what is known as the Mouldsworth Gap, a break in the Mid Cheshire Ridge, which runs north–south through the centre of Cheshire. This region originated at the end of the last ice age, when glacial meltwaters formed a vast lake in the West Cheshire basin which burst through the sandstone ridge, and deposited large amounts of sand and gravel across an extensive outwash fan on the eastern side of the ridge.

== See also ==
- Listed buildings in Mouldsworth
