= Ashton Hayes =

Village in Cheshire, England

Coordinates: 53.219°N 2.740°W

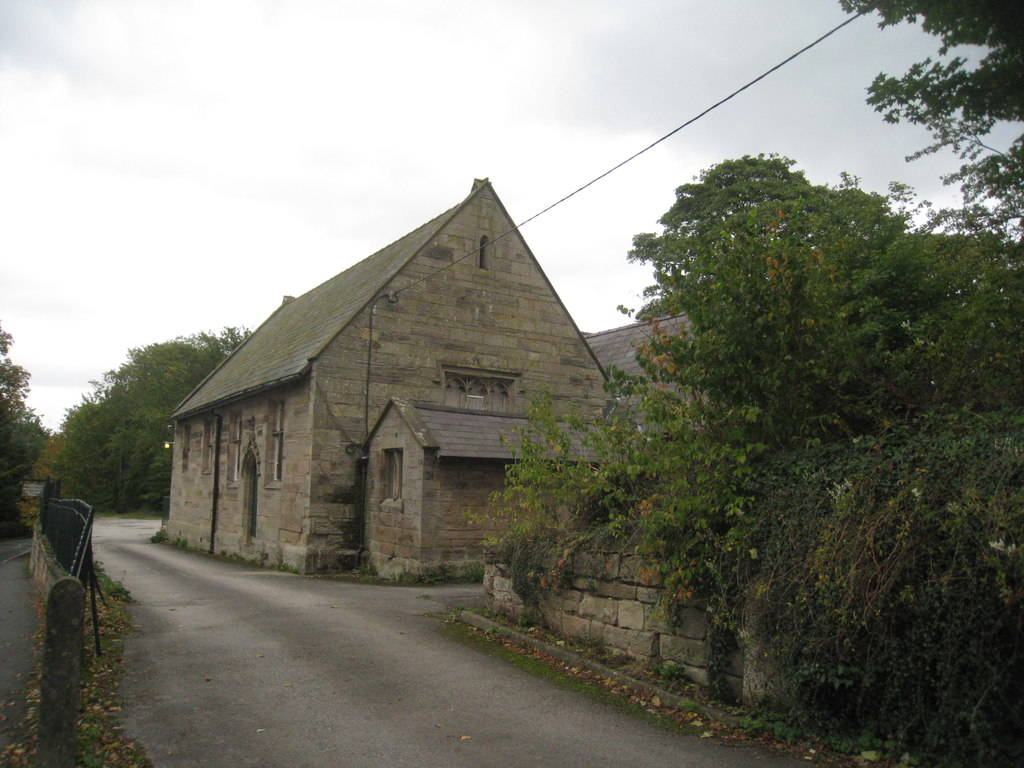
- The village hall, Ashton Hayes

- Location within Cheshire
- Population: 936 (2011 census)
- OS grid reference: SJ511693
- Civil parish: Ashton Hayes and Horton-cum-Peel
- Unitary authority: Cheshire West and Chester
- Ceremonial county: Cheshire
- Region: North West
- Country: England
- Sovereign state: United Kingdom
- Post town: CHESTER
- Postcode district: CH3
- Dialling code: 01829
- Police: Cheshire
- Fire: Cheshire
- Ambulance: North West
- UK Parliament: Runcorn and Helsby

Ashton Hayes is a village and former civil parish, now in the parish of Ashton Hayes and Horton-cum-Peel, in the unitary authority of Cheshire West and Chester and ceremonial county of Cheshire, England. It is located about 8 miles east of Chester on the B5393 road. The nearest villages are Mouldsworth to the north east and Kelsall to the south east. According to the 2011 census it had a population of 936. The main village in the parish – formerly known as Ashton – was renamed Ashton Hayes following a referendum, to avoid confusion with other places of the same name.

== History ==
In 1086, the village was recorded in the Domesday Book as comprising 12 households and lying within the hundred of Rushton in the county of Cheshire.

Ashton was formerly a township and chapelry in the parish of Tarvin, in 1866 Ashton became a civil parish, on 1 April 2015 the parish was abolished to form Ashton Hayes and Horton-cum-Peel, part of it also went to Mouldsworth.

== Medieval pottery kiln ==
In 1933 a pottery kiln, which had been in use between the 13th and 15th century, was discovered in the garden of Smithy House. When excavated, it was found to consist of an oval structure with a stoke-hole on the southeast side. It contained thousands of fragments of broken pottery. Some of these have been reconstructed, forming about 30 objects, mainly jugs and pitchers, which are now in the Grosvenor Museum, Chester. The site of the kiln is a scheduled monument.

== Carbon neutrality ==
In November 2005, the Ashton Hayes Parish Council agreed that the village should try to become England's first carbon neutral village and launched a programme starting 26 January 2006. The move is supported by the local community, businesses, the local council and The Energy Saving Trust. In July 2006 the total annual output of carbon dioxide from the village was calculated by students from the University of Chester at 4,765.76 tonnes.

With the aid of a Defra grant, a film was made explaining the issues and the villagers' efforts, and intended to receive its premiere in the village on 25 January 2007. It is hoped that the film will increase awareness and encourage other communities to adopt the concept.

Measures taken to offset or reduce this have included installing house insulation, installing energy saving light bulbs and wind turbines, and a large number of trees have been planted. In the first year of the programme the village reduced its carbon footprint by 20%. In the 10 years since, the figure rose to 40%. The programme has inspired other towns and cities to adopt similar models.

== See also ==
- Listed buildings in Ashton Hayes
- Carbon footprint
- Bioenergy Village
- Sustainable energy
- Energy use and conservation in the United Kingdom
- Baywind Energy Co-operative
- 2000 Watt society
