= Abbotsford =

Abbotsford may refer:

== Places ==
=== Australia ===
- Abbotsford, New South Wales, a suburb of Sydney
- Abbotsford, Picton, a heritage-listed farm in south-western Sydney
- Abbotsford, Queensland, a locality of Bundaberg
- Abbotsford, Victoria, a suburb of Melbourne
- Abbotsford Station, Queensland

=== Canada ===
- Abbotsford, British Columbia, a city
  - Abbotsford (electoral district), surrounding the Canadian city
  - Abbotsford (provincial electoral district), a former district
- Abbotsford, Quebec, or Saint-Paul-d'Abbotsford

=== New Zealand ===
- Abbotsford, New Zealand, a suburb of Dunedin

=== South Africa ===
- Abbotsford, Johannesburg, a suburb of Johannesburg

=== United Kingdom ===
- Abbotsford, West Sussex, a village in West Sussex

=== United States of America ===
- Abbotsford, Wisconsin
- Abbotsford (Boston, Massachusetts)

== Other uses ==
- Abbotsford Canucks, a team in the American Hockey League
- Abbotsford, Cuddington, a house in Cheshire, England
- Abbotsford, Scottish Borders, home of Scottish novelist Sir Walter Scott, near Melrose, Scotland

== See also ==
- Abbotsford Club, a 19th-century publisher of Middle-English literature
- 1979 Abbotsford landslip, a major landslide which occurred in Abbotsford, New Zealand
