= Listed buildings in Cuddington, Cheshire =

Cuddington is a civil parish in Cheshire West and Chester, England. (Note: There are two civil parishes named Cuddington in Cheshire. The parish that is the subject of this list is located towards the centre of the county, near Northwich. The other parish (also known as Cuddington Heath) is in the southwest of the county, near Malpas.) It contains 15 buildings that are recorded in the National Heritage List for England as designated listed buildings, all of which are listed at Grade II. This grade is the lowest of the three gradings given to listed buildings and is applied to "buildings of national importance and special interest". In the parish are two villages, Cuddington and Sandiway, which are contiguous. The architect John Douglas was born in the village of Sandiway, and seven of the buildings in the list were designed by him, including the village church and its lychgate.

Name and location	Photograph	Date	Notes
The Toolerstone; 53.23830°N 2.59173°W	—	Medieval	This is a medieval boundary stone, marking the boundary between the lands of Vale Royal Abbey and Delamere Forest. It consists of a square stone with eroded markings, standing on a concrete plinth.
Toolerstone; 53.2368°N 2.5897°W	—	Early 17th century	This originated as a two-room sandstone farmhouse. It was extended in the 18th century, and again in the 20th century in brick with timber framing. The building now has an L-shaped plan in two storeys with a five-bay west front. The windows are mullioned.
Yew Tree; 53.2460°N 2.6105°W	—	Early 17th century	Originally a farmhouse, it was extended in 1706. It is timber-framed on a stone plinth with infill partly in brick, and partly plastered. The roofs are slated. The house consists of a main wing with a cross wing, and is in two storeys. The main wing has three, and the cross wing has two. The windows are casements and a half-dormer.
Barn, Gorstage Bank; 53.2395°N 2.5918°W	—	1702	This is a timber-framed building on a stone and brick plinth, with infill partly in brick, and partly plastered. The rear wall is in brick, and the roof is slated. It is in two storeys with a three-bay east front.
Old Mill House; 53.2444°N 2.6066°W	—	Early 18th century	This was built as a miller's house in a single wing. It was extended in the middle of the 19th century to occupy three sides of a courtyard. It is constructed in pebbledashed brick on a stone plinth, and it has a slate roof. The south face is in three storeys with three bays. The windows are sashes, with half-dormers in the top storey.
Bluecap Memorial; 53.22436°N 2.60255°W	—	1772	This was moved to Cheshire Hunt Kennel Yard from Forest Hill in about 1959. It is a memorial to a foxhound called Bluecap of the Tarporley Hunt Club who won a challenge race in 1763. It is in buff and pink sandstone, and consists of an obelisk on a square base, surrounded by a low wall and iron railings. On the north side is an inscribed brass plaque.
Round Tower Lodge; 53.23373°N 2.58379°W		Early 19th century	This was built as an entrance lodge to Vale Royal Abbey for Lord Delamere on the Manchester-Chester turnpike road. It is a two-storey circular sandstone building with an embattled parapet, loopholes and arched openings. It now stands in the central reservation of the A556 road.
Cheshire Hunt Kennels; 53.2247°N 2.6032°W	—	1834	These were designed as kennels for the hounds of the Cheshire Hunt by John Douglas, senior. It is a square area with brick, slated buildings in one and two storeys on the north and west sides, a boiler house, a mash house. The buildings are partitioned with sandstone walls and iron railings. Otherwise there are bricks walls around the perimeter.
Model Cottage; 53.2329°N 2.5865°W	—	c. 1879	Designed by John Douglas, this is a cottage constructed in brick with a slate roof. It is in a single story with an attic, and has a two-bay front. Its features include mullioned windows, a band of brick diapering with plaster infill, a bay window on the left side, a hipped porch, and a gable with timberwork and pargetting.
Abbotsford; 53.2432°N 2.5978°W	—	1890	A large house designed by John Douglas for Jabez S. Thompson of Northwich, later divided into three. It is constructed in red Ruabon brick, with roofs in Lakeland green slate. The house is in two and three storeys, and has a five-bay front. Some of the bays project forward and are gabled. The front is decorated with rendered diapering. The windows are either mullioned, or mullioned and transomed.
St John the Evangelist's Church, Sandiway; 53.2359°N 2.5921°W		1902–03	The church was designed by John Douglas, who donated the land on which it stands, and paid for the chancel. The tower was added after his death. The church is constructed in red sandstone with Lakeland slate roofs. It contains elements of both Decorated and Perpendicular styles. Most of the fittings were also designed by Douglas.
Lychgate, St John's Church, Sandiway; 53.23614°N 2.59219°W	—	c. 1902	The lychgate was designed by John Douglas, and donated by him. It is constructed in sandstone, and has a York stone roof. It contains a gabled gateway, inside which is a wooden gate and seats along the sides.
Croft House; 53.2360°N 2.5931°W	—	1905	Originally a curate's house, this was designed by John Douglas, and was extended in about 1920. It is constructed in pale brick, with dressings and diapering in red brick and terracotta. It is roofed in purple tiles, and is in Neo-Vernacular style. The house has an L-plan, with an east front in one and two storeys, and in four bays with a central doorway. Above the door is a terracotta band bearing an inscription. The windows are mullioned, and there is also a gabled half-dormer.
Croft Cottages; 53.2361°N 2.5927°W	—	1905	These are two cottages and attached outbuildings designed by John Douglas. The cottages are in two storeys, the lower storey in brick with terracotta dressings, and the upper storey timber-framed with plastered infill. Also in the upper storey is a decorated and inscribed bressumer. The cottages are roofed in purple tiles. Their front has four bays. At the rear are two single storey brick outbuildings.
Redwalls; 53.2355°N 2.5931°W	—	1906–07	This was built originally as a house, it was designed by John Douglas, and was called The Homestead. It is constructed in red Ruabon brick with a rendered upper storey, and roofs in Lakeland green slate. It has an H-plan, and is in two and three storeys. The north front has five bays, the lateral bays projecting forward, having gables with ball finials. The house later became a children's home, and then a nursing home.

== See also ==
- Listed buildings in Crowton
- Listed buildings in Hartford
- Listed buildings in Norley
- Listed buildings in Weaverham
- Listed buildings in Whitegate and Marton
- Listed buildings in Delamere
