= St John the Evangelist's Church, Sandiway =

Coordinates: 53.2359°N 2.5921°W

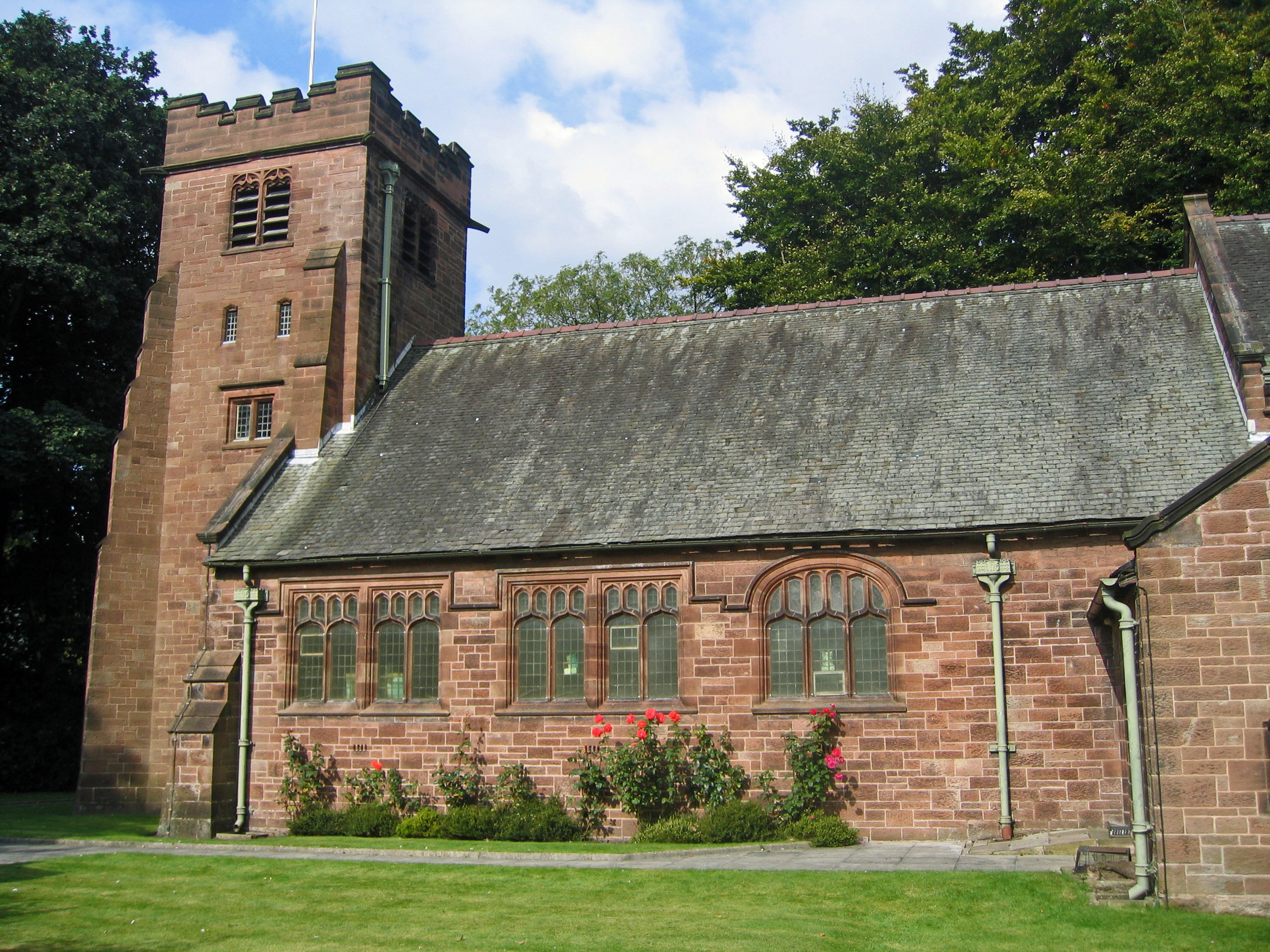
- St John's Church from the south

- Location in Cheshire
- OS grid reference: SJ 606,712
- Location: Sandiway, Cheshire
- Country: England
- Denomination: Anglican
- Website: St John, Sandiway

History
- Status: Parish church
- Dedication: St John the Evangelist

Architecture
- Functional status: Active
- Heritage designation: Grade II
- Designated: 18 July 1986
- Architect: John Douglas
- Architectural type: Church
- Style: Gothic Revival
- Groundbreaking: 1902
- Completed: 1903

Specifications
- Materials: Red sandstone Lakeland slate roof

Administration
- Province: York
- Diocese: Chester
- Archdeaconry: Chester
- Deanery: Middlewich
- Parish: St. John the Evangelist Sandiway

Clergy
- Vicar: Revd Ruth Mock

St John the Evangelist's Church is in the village of Sandiway, Cheshire, England. It is an active Anglican parish church of Sandiway and Cuddington in the diocese of Chester, the archdeaconry of Chester and the deanery of Middlewich. The church is recorded in the National Heritage List for England as a designated Grade II listed building.

== History ==
The church was designed by John Douglas and built between 1902 and 1903. Douglas had been born in the village of Sandiway. He donated the land on which the church was built and paid for the chancel and the lych gate. The tower was added at a later date as a memorial to Douglas. The foundation stone was laid on 12 April 1902 by the Earl of Mansfield, and the church was licensed for divine service on 15 October 1903. On 26 October the dedication and opening ceremony were performed by Rt. Revd. Francis Jayne, Bishop of Chester. The church was at this time a chapel of ease to St Mary's Church, Weaverham. It was licensed for marriages on 22 May 1906. On 29 March 1935 Sandiway was created as a parish in its own right.

== Architecture ==
=== Exterior ===
The church is built in red sandstone with a Lakeland slate roof. Its plan consists of a four-bay nave, a taller three-bay chancel, a south porch, a vestry and a west tower. The nave is in Perpendicular style with Decorated elements elsewhere. The tower is in three stages with diagonal buttresses and a three-light west window. Above this are five strip pilasters that rise to the top of the tower. The parapet is embattled. On the south side of the tower is a door to a projecting stair turret which ends at the second stage.

=== Interior ===
Most of the furnishings were designed by Douglas. In the chancel is a stone sedilia. The choir stalls are carved with poppyheads and angels. The pulpit has carved scenes. Also in the church is a ceramic plaque made by the Della Robbia Pottery of Birkenhead. The stained glass includes windows dating from the early 20th century by Lavers, Barraud and Westlake. The organ was built by Wadsworth in 1903 and cleaned by the same firm in 1917. In 1939 it was rebuilt by Rushworth and Dreaper of Liverpool.

== External features ==
The lych gate was also designed by Douglas, and dates from about 1902. It is constructed in sandstone and has a York stone roof. It is listed at Grade II.

== See also ==
- Listed buildings in Cuddington, Cheshire
- List of new churches by John Douglas
