= Cuddington railway station =

Railway station in Cheshire, England

Coordinates: 53.240°N 2.599°W

Cuddington
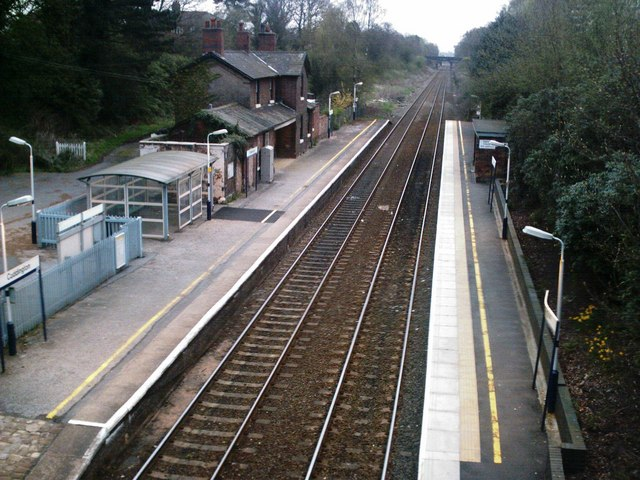

General information
- Location: Cuddington, Cheshire West and Chester; England
- Grid reference: SJ600716
- Managed by: Northern Trains
- Platforms: 2

Other information
- Station code: CUD
- Classification: DfT category F2

History
- Opened: 1869

Passengers
- 2020/21: ▼18,598
- 2021/22: ▲54,570
- 2022/23: ▲66,064
- 2023/24: ▲78,622
- 2024/25: ▲83,840
Location
Notes
- Passenger statistics from the Office of Rail and Road

Cuddington railway station serves the village of Cuddington in Cheshire, England. Opened in 1869 by the West Cheshire Railway, it is located 12 1/2 miles (20.1 km) north east of Chester. It has won a number of awards for its gardens, which are maintained by local volunteers.

== Facilities ==
The station is unstaffed, but as of 2021 has a ticket machine on the Manchester-bound platform for purchase of tickets on the day, and collection of advance purchase tickets. Like neighbouring Delamere, the main building still stands and has been converted for private use (in this case as an art gallery). Standard waiting shelters are provided on each platform, with train running information offered via CIS displays, timetable poster boards and a pay phone. Step-free access is officially only possible to the Manchester-bound platform although there is a level crossing at the western end of the platform which is frequently used.

== Services ==
The station gets one train per hour westbound to Chester and one train per hour eastbound to Manchester Piccadilly. 18 trains per day run to Chester, with 17 running towards Manchester. On Sundays, there is a two-hourly service each way, with 7 trains in each direction. The majority of services are run by Northern Class 150 trains, with some Class 156's also serving the station.

Preceding station	National Rail	Following station
Delamere	Northern Trains (Mid-Cheshire Line)	Greenbank
	Disused railways	
Whitegate	Cheshire Lines Committee; Winsford & Over Branch	Terminus

There have been repeated plans for a half-hourly service in each direction - it was a part of the 2015 franchise agreement - though this has been repeatedly delayed due to capacity constraints between Stockport and Manchester and is yet, as of January 2022, to be implemented.

As of the December 2008 timetable, there were two additional weekday peak services to and from Stockport. On Sundays, a two-hourly service to Chester and Manchester was introduced, with the latter continuing to Southport, via Wigan Wallgate and Bolton. Prior to the new service, trains to Manchester had not operated on Sundays since the early 1990s. Passengers had to change at Altrincham on to the Manchester Metrolink to continue their journeys.

Services beyond Manchester were terminated in the May 2010 timetable change, with all current trains now calling at Manchester Piccadilly and no further.

== Proposed future developments ==
As part of Northern's proposed December 2022 timetable (which focuses on additional services within the Manchester area), an additional 4 trains per day between Chester and Stockport (2 in each direction) have been proposed during peak hours on Mondays to Saturdays. These services are aimed at those who are commuting to and/or working in Manchester and Stockport. This change will increase the number of trains departing Chester on the line to 20 per day, with the number departing Stockport also increased to 20 per day. The 2 hourly Sunday service will remain the same, at 7 trains per day.
