= Listed buildings in Delamere, Cheshire =

Delamere is a village and former civil parish, now in the parish of Delamere and Oakmere, in Cheshire West and Chester, England. It contains nine buildings that are recorded in the National Heritage List for England as designated listed buildings, all of which are listed at Grade II. This grade is the lowest of the three gradings given to listed buildings and is applied to "buildings of national importance and special interest". The largest physical features in the parish are Delamere Forest, and part of the Mid-Cheshire Ridge. Running through the parish are the A54 and A556 roads, and the Chester–Manchester railway line. Other than Delamere Forest, the parish is entirely rural. The listed buildings in the parish include two churches, a sundial and, on the former turnpike roads, two mileposts and two buildings that originated as toll houses.

Name and location	Photograph	Date	Notes
Gates, railings and gatepiers, Sandy Brow; 53.20030°N 2.63080°W	—	Early 18th century	The small gate dates from the early 18th century, and the gatepiers from the late 19th century. With the addition of the large gates and the railings, the whole was reassembled between 1905 and 1925 for Lord Wavertree.
St Peter's Church; 53.2124°N 2.6598°W		1816–17	The church was designed by James Gunnery, and alterations were made in 1878. It is constructed in Manley sandstone with a slate roof in Decorated style. It has short transepts and a west tower with an embattled parapet above which is a pyramidal cap.
Methodist Chapel; 53.1972°N 2.7015°W	—	1823	A chapel in rendered stone with slate roofs. It has a T-shaped plan with a gabled front containing a gabled porch. The windows are arched.
Sundial; 53.21223°N 2.66021°W		Early 19th century	The sundial in St Peter's Churchyard consists of a sandstone baluster with a carved capital carrying a circular plate.
Kelsall Lodge; 53.2134°N 2.6901°W		Early 19th century	This originated as a turnpike toll house. It is a roughcast building in one storey with a hipped slate roof, and a three-bay front. It contains windows with pointed arches in cast iron frames.
The Old Toll House; 53.2130°N 2.6886°W		Early 19th century	This originated as a turnpike toll house. It is a roughcast building in one storey with a hipped slate roof, and a two-bay front. It contains cast iron small-pane windows.
Milepost; 53.21333°N 2.69224°W	—	Early to mid-19th century	A cast iron turnpike milepost with a domed cap carrying curved plates giving the distance in miles to Chester, Kelsall and Northwich.
Delamere School; 53.2111°N 2.6714°W		1846	Built in sandstone, the school has a tiled roof and an octagonal stone chimney. The symmetrical front is in a single storey with six bays. Its features include a pair of canted bow windows, finials on the gables, and a bellcote.
Milepost; 53.21088°N 2.66947°W	—	Mid-19th century	A cast iron squat milepost with a domed cap carrying a curved plate giving the distance in miles to Chester, Kelsall, Tarvin, Knutsford, Altrincham, and Northwich.

== See also ==
- Listed buildings in Ashton Hayes
- Listed buildings in Cuddington
- Listed buildings in Kelsall
- Listed buildings in Little Budworth
- Listed buildings in Manley
- Listed buildings in Norley
- Listed buildings in Utkinton
- Listed buildings in Whitegate and Marton
- Listed buildings in Willington
