= The Homestead, Sandiway =

The Homestead
- Location in Cheshire
- 53.2355°N 2.5931°W
- Location: Weaverham Road, Sandiway, Cheshire, England
- OS grid reference: SJ 605 711

History
- Built: c. 1906–07
- Built for: B. J. Sanby

Site notes
- Architect: John Douglas

Listed Building – Grade II
- Designated: 18 July 1986
- Reference no.: 1227732

The Homestead (now Redwalls) is a large house in Weaverham Road, Sandiway, Cheshire, England. It is recorded in the National Heritage List for England as a designated Grade II listed building.

== History ==
The house was designed by the Chester architect John Douglas and built in about 1906–07 on land he owned himself in Sandiway, the village of his birth. The house and stables were built for B. J. Sanby, who bought the land from Douglas. By the 1970s its name had been changed to Redwalls and it was being used as a children's home. As of 2009 it is a private nursing home.

== Architecture ==
The house is constructed in Ruabon brick and has a chipped and rendered upper storey; the roofs are in Lakeland green slate and the chimneys are brick. Its north (entrance) front has five bays. The outer bays project forwards and are gabled with finials. In the centre is a projecting porch with pilasters, over which is a balustrade including a panel containing a carved griffon and motto. The garden front has a pair of two-storey canted bay windows. Brick extensions were added to the east of the building during the 20th century.

== See also ==
- Listed buildings in Cuddington, Cheshire
- List of houses and associated buildings by John Douglas
