= Oakmere =

Coordinates: 53.217°N 2.633°W

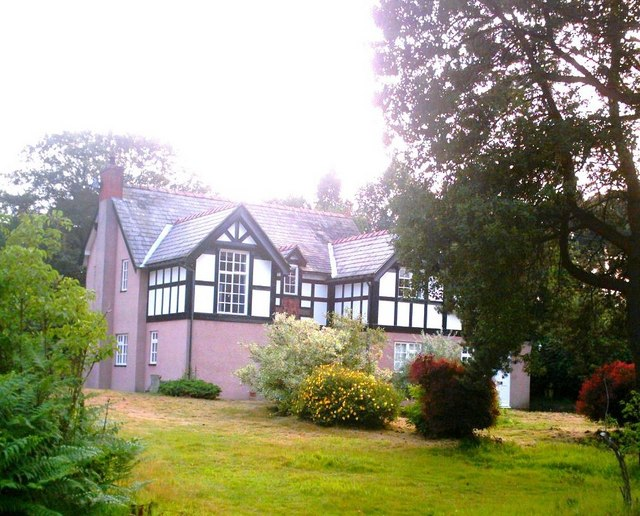
- Keeper's Cottage, Oakmere

- Location within Cheshire
- Population: 589 (2011)
- OS grid reference: SJ573693
- Civil parish: Delamere and Oakmere
- Unitary authority: Cheshire West and Chester
- Ceremonial county: Cheshire
- Region: North West
- Country: England
- Sovereign state: United Kingdom
- Post town: NORTHWICH
- Postcode district: CW8
- Dialling code: 01606
- Police: Cheshire
- Fire: Cheshire
- Ambulance: North West
- UK Parliament: Chester South and Eddisbury

Oakmere is a village and former civil parish, now in the parish of Delamere and Oakmere, in the Cheshire West and Chester district, in the county of Cheshire, England. The population of the civil parish taken at the 2011 census was 589. Oakmere was formerly a township in the parish of Delamere, in 1866 Oakmere became a civil parish, on 1 April 2015 the parish was abolished and merged with Delamere to form "Delamere and Oakmere", part also went to Cuddington.

Oakmere is on the A556 road, approximately 7 miles (11 km) west of Frodsham. The adjoining village of Delamere has a post office, church and railway station on the Chester to Manchester line.

The area is mainly agricultural, and has a number of large sand quarries nearby, some of which are wet workings. The lake from which the village takes its name is a Site of Special Scientific Interest.

== See also ==
- Listed buildings in Oakmere
