= Model Cottage, Sandiway =

Cottage in Cheshire, England

Coordinates: 53.2318°N 2.5905°W

Model Cottage, Sandiway is a house in the village of Sandiway, Cheshire, England. It is recorded in the National Heritage List for England as a designated Grade II listed building. Designed by the Chester architect John Douglas and built in approximately 1879 (probably on his own land), the two-storey property is made from orange brick and features a Welsh slate roof. The main front has two gabled bays and an extension to the right. The left bay has a single-light window in the lower storey and a five-light mullioned window with semicircular arches in the upper storey. Between the storeys is brick diapering with plaster infills. In the gable above the window are square plaster panels surrounded by brick. The right bay projects forwards and has five-light mullioned arched windows on both storeys; it is without decoration. In the angle between the bays is a single-story porch with a four-light straight-headed mullioned window. There are two tall brick chimney stacks.

== See also ==
- Listed buildings in Cuddington, Cheshire
- List of houses and associated buildings by John Douglas
