= Bluecap Memorial =

Memorial in Cuddington, Cheshire, England

Coordinates: 53.22436°N 2.60254°W

The Bluecap Memorial stands in the yard of the Cheshire Hunt Kennels in Kennel Lane, Sandiway, Cheshire, England. Bluecap was a Cheshire foxhound that was famous for winning a race against the hounds of Hugo Meynell of the Quorn Hunt in 1763. The memorial is in sandstone and consists of an obelisk standing on a plinth, with a brass plaque inscribed with a poem. It is recorded in the National Heritage List for England as a designated Grade II listed building.

== History ==
Bluecap (or Blue Cap) was a foxhound owned by John Smith-Barry, son of the 4th Earl of Barrymore, and was a member of the first pack of foxhounds to be founded in Cheshire. The pack was housed in Forest Kennels, Speedwell Hill. In 1763 Smith-Barry was challenged to a bet by Hugo Meynell of the Quorn Hunt, one of the most influential men in the development of fox-hunting, to a race between two of each other's hounds. The race was held over a four-mile course at Newmarket. Meynell's hounds were favourites at odds of 7–4, but Bluecap won easily, and Bluecap's daughter, Wanton, came second. Bluecap became a legend in northwest England, outstripping the rest of the pack, and died at the age of 13 in 1772. Smith-Barry arranged for the memorial to be made, and it was initially erected at Speedwell Hill, being moved to its present position in the yard of the Cheshire Hunt Kennels in 1959. The sculptor of the memorial is unknown.

== Description ==
The memorial is constructed in buff and pink sandstone, and stands 200 centimetres (6.6 ft) high. It is surrounded by a low wall and railings. The memorial has square base, and consists of a square pier with a moulded plinth and cornice, which is surmounted by an obelisk. On the north face of the pier is a brass plate inscribed with details of the foxhound and its owner, followed by a poem, all in copperplate script. The inscription reads as follows:

To the Memory of old Bluecap a Fox Hound the late Property of the Hon. John Smith Barry
This obelisk Reader is a Monument rais'd
To a shade, tho' a Hound, that deserves to be prais'd
For if Life's but a Stage where on each act a Part
And true greatness a Form, that's deriv'd from the Heart
If Fame, Honour and Glory depend on the Deed
Then O Bluecap, rare Bluecap, will boast of thy Breed
If not a Tear, yet a Glass, will we pour on the Brute
So high fam'd as he was in the glorious Pursuit
But no more of this Theme, since the Life's but a Race
And Bluecap but gone to the Death of the Chace

== Other memorials ==
Bluecap was a great favourite locally, and was painted at least twice. One of the paintings was commissioned by the Tarporley Hunt Club, and hangs in the Swan Hotel in Tarporley. Another painting was executed by Francis Sartorius in 1774. The foxhound is also commemorated in Ballads and Legends of Cheshire, written by Egerton Leigh in 1867, and the Blue Cap Inn in Sandiway is named after it.

== Appraisal ==
The memorial was designated as a Grade II listed building on 18 July 1986. Grade II is the lowest of the three grades of listing and is applied to "buildings of national importance and special interest".

== See also ==
- Listed buildings in Cuddington, Cheshire
