= Whitegate railway station =

Former railway station in Cheshire, England

Coordinates: 53.2075°N 2.5779°W

Whitegate
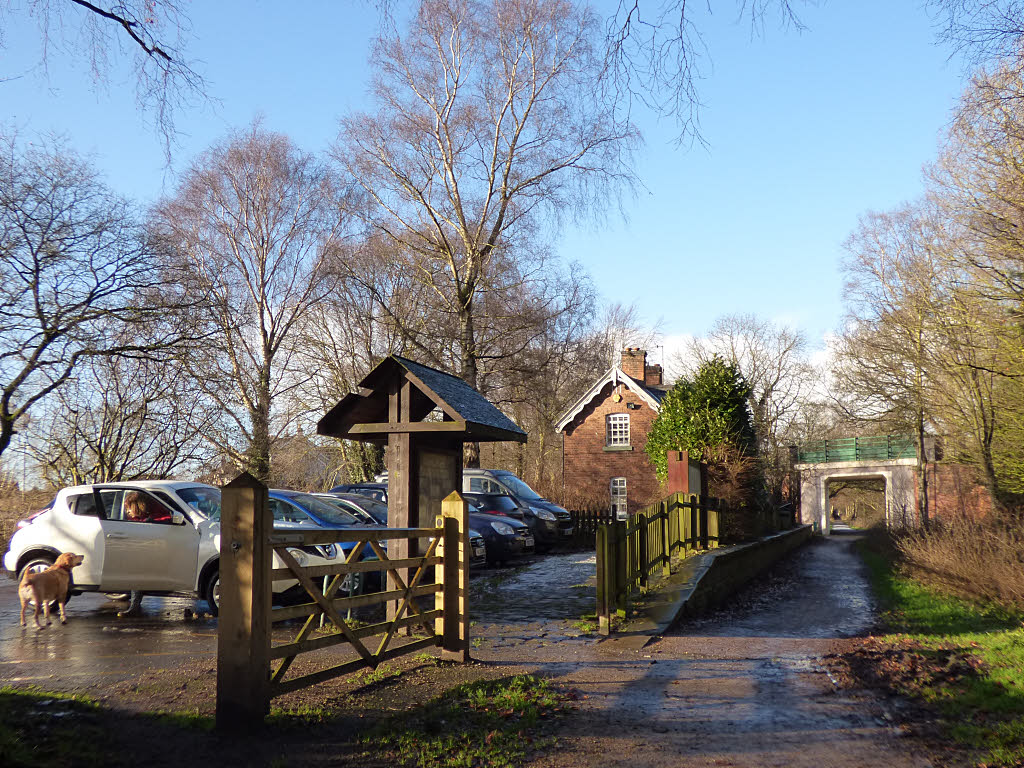
- Preserved platform and station building (2017)

General information
- Location: Whitegate, Cheshire West and Chester; England
- Platforms: 1

Other information
- Status: Disused

History
- Original company: Cheshire Lines Committee
- Pre-grouping: Cheshire Lines Committee
- Post-grouping: Cheshire Lines Committee

Key dates
- 1 July 1870: Opened
- 1 January 1874: Closed
- 1 May 1886: Reopened
- 1 December 1888: Closed again
- 1 February 1892: Reopened
- 1 January 1931: Closed to passengers
- 4 November 1963: Closed completely
Location

Whitegate railway station was the only intermediate stop on the Winsford and Over Branch Line; it served the village of Whitegate, in Cheshire, England.

== History ==
The station was opened on 1 July 1870, in a remote rural location to the east of Marton Green.

There was only one platform, as a passing loop for goods trains was provided. A goods yard with two sidings was provided on the south side of the line.

Preceding station	Disused railways	Following station
Winsford and Over	Cheshire Lines Committee; Winsford and Over Branch	Cuddington

== The site today ==
The station buildings and platform are extant; they are used as a cafe for the Whitegate Way, a shared-use path which follows the old track bed.
