= Listed buildings in Oakmere =

Oakmere is a village and former civil parish, now in the parish of Delamere and Oakmere, in Cheshire West and Chester, England. It contains four buildings that are recorded in the National Heritage List for England as designated listed buildings, all of which are at Grade II. This grade is the lowest of the three gradings given to listed buildings and is applied to "buildings of national importance and special interest". The parish is entirely rural, and is traversed by the A556 road.

Name and location	Photograph	Date	Notes
Vale Royal Abbey Arms; 53.2129°N 2.6551°W		1818	A public house that was extended later in the 19th century. It is constructed in sandstone with slate roofs. The front is in two and three storeys and has five bays, the lateral two bays resulting from the later extension. The windows in the older part are casements, those in the newer wings are sashes. The central bay contains a porch above which are the arms of Vale Royal Abbey.
Stables, Vale Royal Abbey Arms; 53.2127°N 2.6550°W		1818	The stables were extended later in the 19th century. They are constructed in sandstone with a hipped slate roof. The building is in two storeys, with a three-bay front. Features include an arched doorway, pitch holes and lean-tos.
Milepost; 53.21544°N 2.64739°W	—	Mid 19th century	A cast iron squat milepost with a domed cap carrying a curved plate giving the distance in miles to Chester, Kelsall, Tarvin, Knutsford, Altrincham, and Northwich.
Oakmere Hall; 53.2296°N 2.6148°W		1867	This is a large country house designed by John Douglas. It is constructed in freestone from Lancashire in French Gothic style with roofs of Westmorland slate. Since the 1940s it has been used as a rehabilitation centre for injured miners, then by the National Health Service, again for rehabilitation, and later converted into flats.
Overdale; 53.2223°N 2.6118°W	—	1875	Originally a hunting box, it was designed by John Douglas for the Wilbraham family. The building is constructed in brick with sandstone and terracotta dressings, and has slate roofs. The chimneys are in brick and are decorated with pilasters. It has an irregular plan, in three storeys, with a five-bay west front. To the north are stables and service buildings around a courtyard.
