= Oakmere Hall =

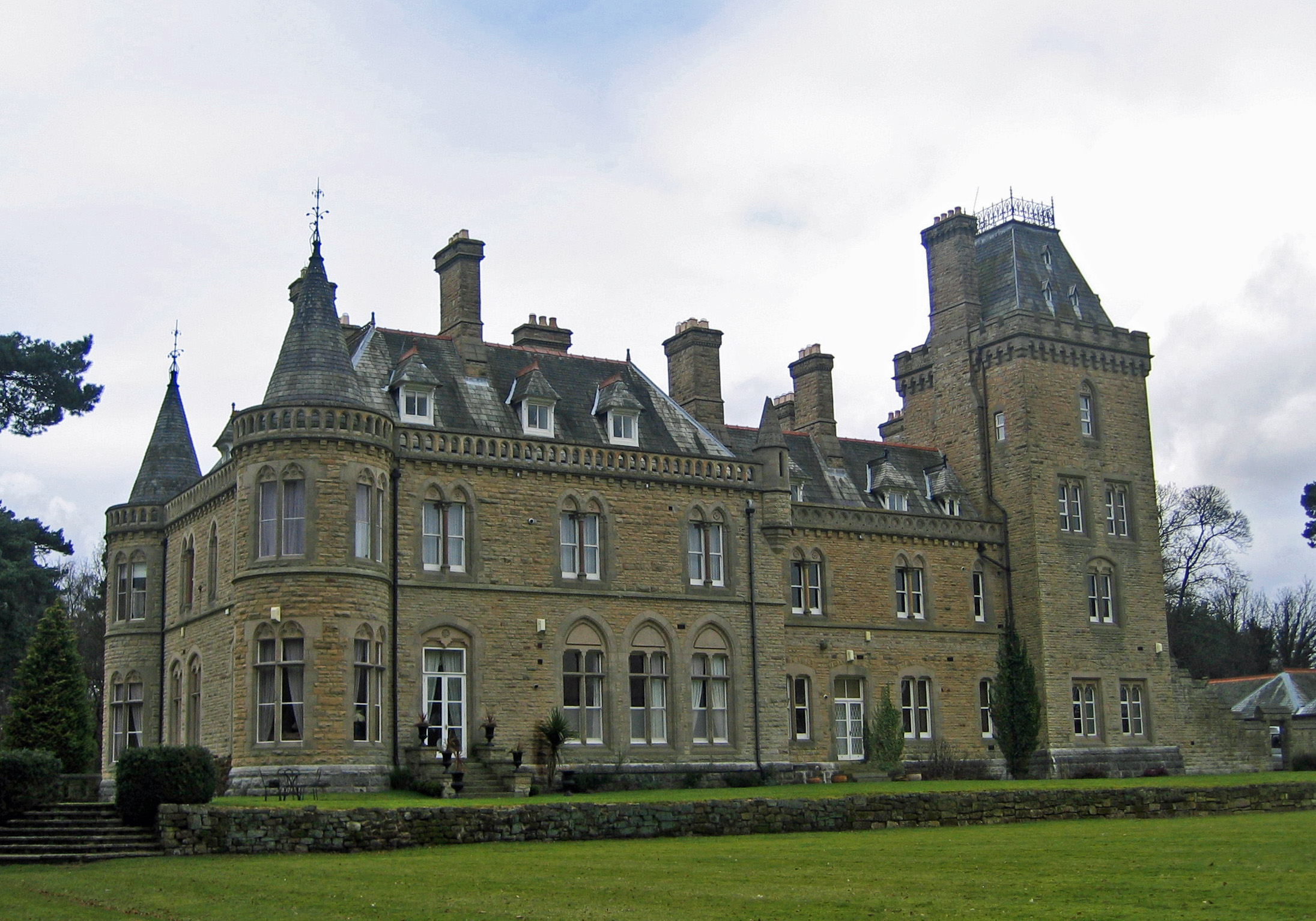
- Oakmere Hall garden front

- Location in Cheshire
- 53.2296°N 2.6148°W
- Location: Sandiway, Cheshire, England
- OS grid reference: SJ 590,704

History
- Built: 1867
- Built for: John & Thomas Johnson

Site notes
- Architect: John Douglas
- Architectural style: French Gothic

Listed Building – Grade II
- Designated: 6 January 1978
- Reference no.: 1313106

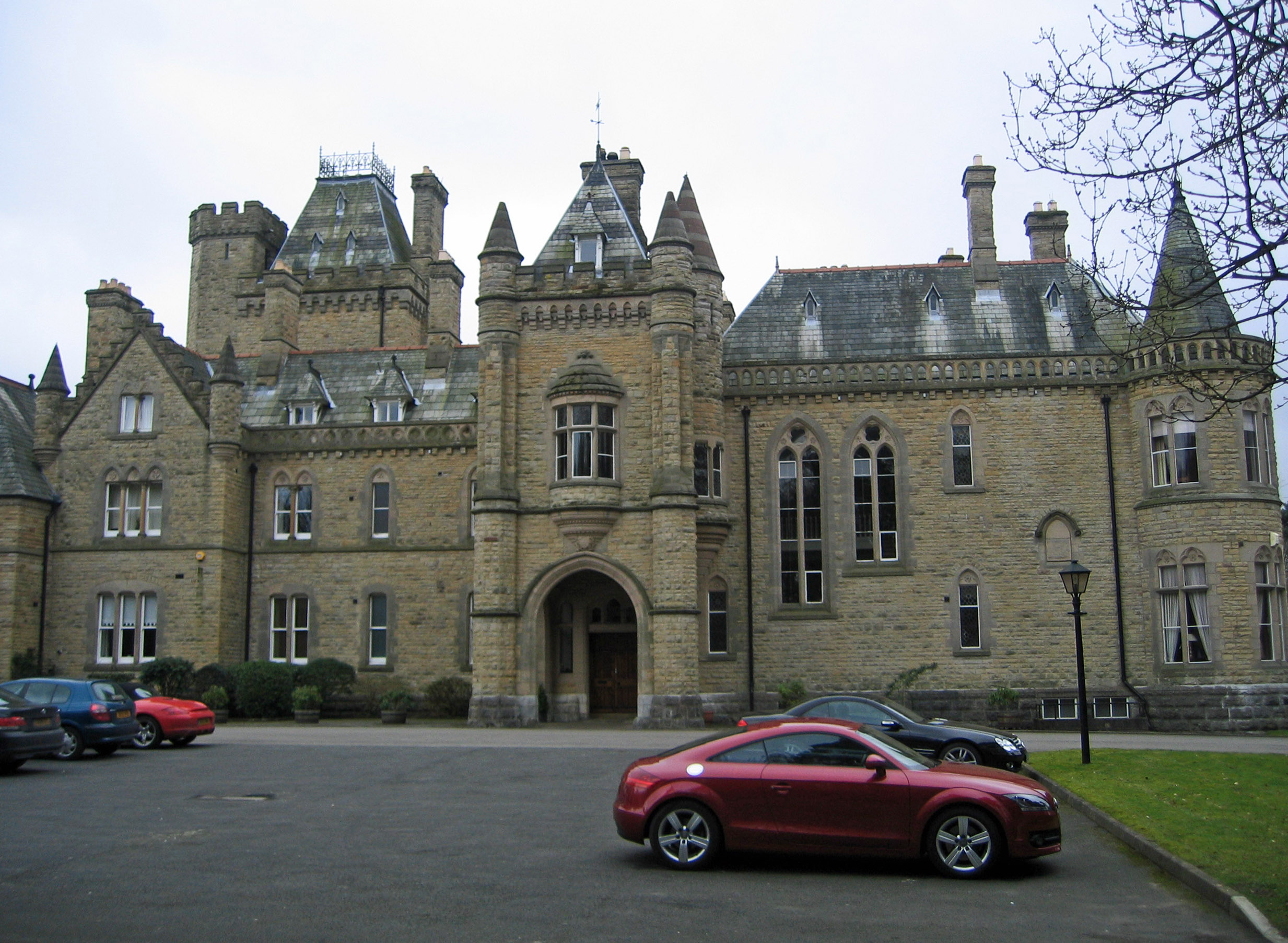
Entrance front

Oakmere Hall is a large house to the southwest of the villages of Cuddington and Sandiway, Cheshire, England, near the junction of the A49 and A556 roads. It is recorded in the National Heritage List for England as a designated Grade II listed building. It was originally a private house and later became a rehabilitation centre and hospital. It has since been divided into residential apartments.

== History ==
The house is dated 1867 and was designed by John Douglas. It was the most ambitious of Douglas' early works and one of the largest houses he designed. Douglas also designed the two entrance lodges. It had been built for John & Thomas Johnson, merchants and chemical manufacturers of Runcorn. However they lost all their ships in the blockade of Charleston in 1865 and subsequently became bankrupt. The house was bought from them by John Higson, a Liverpool merchant, who became the house's first resident. He was followed by John Hayes Higson and then by Captain William Higson, the head of Higson's Brewery in Liverpool. The last owner was Charles James Lamb, a shipping merchant in Manchester who died in 1942.

In 1943 the house was bought by the Miners’ Welfare Commission and it became a rehabilitation centre for injured miners. In 1951 it became part of the National Health Service, initially for rehabilitation for people injured in industrial accidents, and later for rehabilitation for all groups of people, including children. It has been converted into flats.

== Architecture ==
=== Exterior ===
The house is built in freestone from Lancashire in French Gothic style with roofs of Westmorland slate. It is in two storeys with a nine-bay west (garden) front. The entrance is behind a two-storey porte-cochère which has been finished as a gatehouse. This is flanked by octagonal pilasters which end as turrets and on the first floor there is an oriel window. At the right of the west (entrance) front is a circular projection with a tall conical roof and at the left end is an octagonal turret with a tall pyramidal roof. The east front includes a massive three-storey tower with an embattled parapet and a truncated pyramidal roof with a wrought iron balustrade. The tower has an additional octagonal turret.

=== Interior ===
In the original ground-floor plan, the porte-cochère led into the entrance hall with the staircase hall on its right. To the right of these were two drawing rooms and in front of halls, overlooking the garden, was the dining room. To the left were the servants' quarters with a billiard room at the extreme left on the first floor. Considerable alterations were made in the 20th century to the interior of the house to adapt it for its later purposes.

== See also ==
- Listed buildings in Oakmere
- List of houses and associated buildings by John Douglas
