= Albert Johnson (footballer, born 1920) =

English footballer

Albert Johnson (15 July 1920 – 22 June 2011) was a professional footballer who played as an outside right for Everton, Chesterfield and Witton Albion. He was born in Weaverham, Cheshire.
