= Abbotsford, Cuddington =

Grade II listed English country house in Cheshire

Abbotsford
- Location in Cheshire
- 53.2432°N 2.5978°W
- Location: Cuddington, Cheshire, England
- OS grid reference: SJ 602 720

History
- Built: 1890
- Built for: Jabez S. Thompson

Site notes
- Architect: John Douglas

Listed Building – Grade II
- Designated: 15 June 1979
- Reference no.: 1287519

Abbotsford is a house on the east side of Warrington Road, Cuddington, Cheshire, England. It is recorded in the National Heritage List for England as a designated Grade II listed building.

The house was built in 1890 for Jabez S. Thompson of Northwich and designed by the Chester architect John Douglas. The house is constructed in Ruabon red brick with Lakeland slate roofs. Its plan is irregular, with a front of five bays which includes two gables and plaster diapering.

== See also ==
- Listed buildings in Cuddington, Cheshire
- List of houses and associated buildings by John Douglas
