= Delamere railway station =

Railway station in Cheshire, England

Coordinates: 53.229°N 2.667°W

Delamere
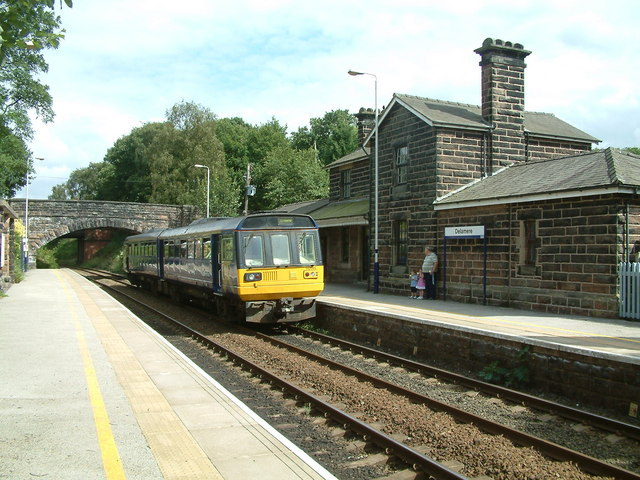

General information
- Location: Delamere, Cheshire West and Chester; England
- Grid reference: SJ556704
- Manager: Northern Trains
- Platforms: 2

Other information
- Station code: DLM
- Classification: DfT category F1

History
- Opened: 22 June 1870

Passengers
- 2020/21: ▼11,902
- 2021/22: ▲40,508
- 2022/23: ▲48,882
- 2023/24: ▲54,316
- 2024/25: ▲57,136
Location
Notes
- Passenger statistics from the Office of Rail and Road

Delamere railway station opened on 22 June 1870. It serves both the village of Delamere and Delamere Forest in Cheshire, England. The station is 9½ miles (15 km) east of Chester on the Mid-Cheshire Line. There is an hourly service each way between Chester and Manchester in each direction, with Delamere being previously operated as a request stop only until the spring 2010 timetable change. The station marks one end of the Baker Way footpath.

== Facilities ==
The station is unstaffed. A ticket vending machine is in place for purchase of tickets or promise to pay coupons and for the collection of pre-paid tickets. The old station buildings are now privately owned and have been adapted for use as the 'Station House' cafe. Waiting shelters, CIS displays and timetable information poster boards are provided on each platform - train running information is also available via a public telephone. Step-free access is available to both platforms.

== Services ==
The station gets one train per hour westbound to Chester and one train per hour eastbound to Manchester Piccadilly. 18 trains per day run to Chester, with 17 running towards Manchester. On Sundays, there is a two-hourly service each way, with 7 trains in each direction. The majority of services are run by Northern Class 150 trains, with some Class 156's also serving the station.

| Preceding station | National Rail | Following station |
|---|---|---|
| Mouldsworth | Northern Trains (Mid-Cheshire Line) | Cuddington |

There have been repeated plans for a half-hourly service in each direction - it was a part of the 2015 franchise agreement - though this has been repeatedly delayed due to capacity constraints between Stockport and Manchester and is yet, as of January 2022, to be implemented.

As of the December 2008 timetable, there were two additional weekday peak services to and from Stockport. On Sundays, a two-hourly service to Chester and Manchester was introduced, with the latter continuing to Southport, via Wigan Wallgate and Bolton. Prior to the new service, trains to Manchester had not operated on Sundays since the early 1990s. Passengers had to change at Altrincham on to the Manchester Metrolink to continue their journeys.

Services beyond Manchester were terminated in the May 2010 timetable change, with all current trains now calling at Manchester Piccadilly and no further.

== Proposed future developments ==
As part of Northern's proposed December 2022 timetable (which focuses on additional services within the Manchester area), an additional 4 trains per day between Chester and Stockport (2 in each direction) have been proposed during peak hours on Mondays to Saturdays. These services are aimed at those who are commuting to and/or working in Manchester and Stockport. This change will increase the number of trains departing Chester on the line to 20 per day, with the number departing Stockport also increased to 20 per day. The 2 hourly Sunday service will remain the same, at 7 trains per day.
