= Winsford and Over branch line =

Former railway line in Cheshire, England

The Winsford and Over branch line was a railway line serving the town of Winsford, in Cheshire, England. It was operated by the Cheshire Lines Committee (CLC) from 1870 until the railways were nationalised under the Transport Act 1947, which took effect on 1 January 1948. Thereafter, the branch was operated by British Railways' London Midland Region until the line's closure in 1967.

== Beginnings ==
In 1861, the West Cheshire Railway Company (WCR) presented a bill to Parliament for the construction of a railway from Northwich to Chester with a branch to Helsby. The route was approved, with the exception of the section from Mouldsworth to Chester. The following year, the WCR presented another bill, once again seeking authorisation to build the line to Chester, but also proposing two branches, one of which would run from a junction with the WCR west of Cuddington to Winsford. This would allow the WCR access to the traffic generated by the salt works lining the west bank of the River Weaver near the town. The Chester line was again rejected but the branches were authorised.

Work on construction started early in 1867. By this time, the WCR had been absorbed by the Cheshire Lines Committee. The branch was completed and opened to goods traffic on 1 June 1870. Passenger services began on 1 July 1870.

== Route ==
The branch left the CLC's Manchester to Chester line at Winsford Junction, about ¾ of a mile west of Cuddington railway station. The junction was a double junction facing towards Cuddington but the line became single track almost immediately and headed off in a south-westerly direction, turning gradually towards the south-east and climbing steadily for a mile before levelling off. The route continued on a level for a further mile and then started to descend into the Weaver valley before reaching Whitegate, the only intermediate station, two and a half miles from Winsford junction. The facilities there were a loop (not used as a passing loop) and two long sidings. A single platform face was provided.

The line continued its descent for a further two and a half miles until Falk's Junction was reached. Here a branch line diverged to the north-east to serve the H.E. Falk Meadowbank salt works. The main line turned south continued for the last mile along the west bank of the River Weaver until reaching the southern terminus.

This final stretch was doubled in 1892, and sidings all along this section served the many salt works to be found by the river. This portion of the branch was built on land previously owned by Lord Delamere and one of the terms of sale was that if the railway continued on to Winsford, the company would be obliged to operate services for the benefit of the townspeople. This became important later during the wrangles between the CLC and the Winsford Local Board caused by the withdrawal of the passenger service. (Note: The local board of health was the predecessor to the urban district council)

The Winsford terminus was named Winsford and Over to distinguish it from the station already serving the town on the London and North Western Railway's main line between London and the North.

By 1879, some of the sidings at Winsford were extended southwards into Hamlett's Central Saltworks and J Garner and Co.'s Bridge Saltworks bringing the length of the branch to a maximum of 6 miles 12 chains and 19 yards.

Though salt was the lifeblood of the branch, it was also a constant hindrance. The salt was extracted by pumping water through the salt and extracting it as brine. This led to much subsidence, which at times caused parts of the branch to be closed.

== Operation ==
Goods and passenger services were originally to be operated from Northwich, but in the event nearly always started and terminated at Cuddington. This caused some operational problems with passenger services as the station there was not provided with a bay platform. This meant that branch passenger trains had to wait in the goods sidings until main line services had cleared the platforms.

Most of the goods traffic was generated by the salt works. Coal was carried towards Winsford and salt toward Cuddington. By 1885, five goods trains in each direction per day were required.

All services were initially operated by the Manchester, Sheffield and Lincolnshire Railway (MSLR) which later became the Great Central Railway (GCR). The MSLR supplied locomotives while the CLC provided passenger and goods stock.

The traffic was regulated and safeguarded using the staff and ticket system and later, after passenger services had been withdrawn, one engine in steam. Trains could only pass at Falk's junction.

== Passenger services ==
Passenger services on the line commenced on 1 July 1870 and consisted of a single carriage attached to two weekday goods services making up a mixed train. These trains were of necessity slow and not many passengers were attracted to use the service. The service was seen as interfering with the goods services by the CLC and they withdrew it on 1 January 1874. Despite the low numbers of passengers which had used the service, there was considerable local petitioning for it to be reinstated. The CLC were reluctant to do this and passenger services did not run again until 1 May 1886 once again as mixed trains. This was as a result of the Winsford Local Board invoking the covenant on the original land sale which required the CLC to provide such a service.

The only accident of note on the branch occurred on 25 August 1888 when a mixed train ran into a siding in error. The guard was quite seriously hurt but passengers suffered only minor injuries. The report resulting from the subsequent enquiry castigated the CLC for running passenger services on a line with insufficient signalling and demanded that interlocking be installed before passengers were to be carried again. The CLC immediately gave notice that passenger services would be withdrawn, citing the cost of the installation. The Winsford Local Board once again campaigned for a reinstatement, eventually bringing a legal case based on the Delamere covenant before the Royal Courts of Justice on 25 February 1891. The courts found in favour of the Board and the CLC was forced to upgrade the branch accordingly. A second line was laid alongside the line leading to the sidings where the accident happened. This was reserved for passenger trains, which the CLC now ran in place of the mixed trains. Additional signal boxes and signalling were installed and on 1 February 1892 after having passed an inspection, passenger services resumed. The level of passenger workings was increased and the branch remained relatively busy, with workmen's trains supplementing the timetabled service.

From the mid-1920s onward, road competition began to take its toll on the passenger revenue. Bus services were introduced which ran direct from Winsford to Northwich town centre quicker than the train. The CLC introduced a Sentinel steam railcar in 1929 in an attempt to reduce costs, but despite this, in 1930 they announced their intention to withdraw the passenger service once again.

Winsford Urban District Council, the successor to the Local Board, made recourse to the law once more. This time however the court ruled in favour of the railway company, declaring the ruling of 1891 a "mistake in law". The passenger service succumbed for the final time on 1 January 1931.

A few excursions and special trains did visit the branch after this date. On 31 January 1931, a football excursion from Winsford to Chester was organised. On 17 October 1953, an enthusiasts' special organised by the Railway Correspondence and Travel Society (RTCS) visited the branch, consisting of an ex-GCR two coach push-pull set with GCR Class 9K (LNER class C13) no. 67436 in charge. The final excursion was on 26 March 1960, again organised by the RTCS, consisting of five corridor carriages hauled by LMS Ivatt Class 2 2-6-0 no. 46472. This is almost certainly the only time that corridor carriages had been used on the branch. The train stopped short of Winsford and Over station but the locomotive continued into the station to run round its train.

== Locomotives ==
Motive power on the branch was provided by the MSLR (later the GCR). The first recorded use of locomotives used on the line is in 1886, when goods and mixed trains were handled by Charles Sacre's Class 23 0-6-0s. Shortly after the turn of the century, these were superseded by Sacre Class 18s. Passenger services were initially handled by a Sacre Class 24 2-4-0 then by similar Class 12A 2-4-0s.

At the end of the first decade of the 20th century, the Sacre locomotives started being replaced by Thomas Parker designs, in particular GCR class 9B and GCR Class 9D (LNER Class J9) 0-6-0s. Passenger trains at this period were worked by older Parker GCR Class 3 (LNER Class F1) 2-4-2 tank engines.

In the 1920s, the workmen's trains were discontinued and only one passenger locomotive and set of carriages were required to work the branch. The F1 tank engines were replaced by one of the GCR Class 2A (LNER class D7) locomotives then allocated to Northwich shed. The F1s returned in 1928, but were in turn supplanted by Sentinel Waggon Works steam coach no 602 which worked the branch until passenger services ceased at the end of 1930. This vehicle was one of four owned by the CLC; the only motive power ever owned by the company. During this period, there was no longer any requirement for stabling facilities at Winsford as the first and last passenger trains started and finished at Northwich and it was arranged that the goods services also followed this pattern. Thus the CLC could now close the small locomotive shed at the terminus, which up until this point had been a sub-shed of Northwich motive power depot.

From the mid-1920s, the ubiquitous GCR Class 9H (LNER Class J10) and GCR Class 9J (LNER Class J11) 0-6-0 tender locomotives began to appear hauling goods services on the branch. These were gradually displaced after nationalisation by ex-LMS Fowler Class 4Fs, LMS Class 2MT 2-6-0s, BR standard class 2 2-6-0s and it is possible that occasionally a Northwich-based LMS Stanier Class 8F was rostered.

Class 24 and British Rail Class 25 diesels based at Northwich hauled the trip freights that used the branch three times a week on Mondays, Wednesdays and Fridays in the 1960s. Only one other diesel-electric locomotive was ever known to have traversed the branch, a Class 40 which travelled down to Wade's Crossing, between Falk's Junction and Winsford and Over, in spring 1968; this was shortly after the branch was closed to provide a British Rail presence during some road works near there by the Winsford Council. Any track removal trains would have been diesel-hauled by that date of course, steam locomotion on British Rail ceasing in August 1968, but these are not recorded.

== Decline and closure ==
After withdrawal of the passenger service, the operation of the branch was simplified and economies made. The locomotive shed at Winsford closed in July 1929 and was demolished, the double track section of the branch near Falk's Junction was reduced to a single line and various signal boxes were downgraded to ground frames or removed altogether.

The salt industry in the area began a slow decline from as early as 1905, as the traditional open pan method of extracting salt was superseded. The decline continued apace during the 1930s depression and goods traffic on the branch dwindled to the extent that in 1953 British Railways considered closing the line completely. An arrangement with Imperial Chemical Industries (ICI), who by then owned some of the surviving salt works in the area, allowed the railway to soldier on with two goods trains per weekday, although Winsford goods yard had closed on 1 September 1953.

The line closed to general goods on 4 November 1963, when Whitegate station was closed completely. The only services now were to the salt works and mines. Further trimming of the branch followed when, on 1 May 1965, the section between Falk's junction and the salt works to the south was closed. On 13 March 1967, rail traffic finally ceased and the branch officially closed on 5 June 1967.

== Preservation ==
Cheshire County Council purchased five and a half miles of the trackbed on 26 March 1969 and converted it into a shared-use path known as the Whitegate Way. The station building and platform at Whitegate are now a visitor centre and the main access point for walkers.
