= St Peter's Church, Delamere =

Coordinates: 53.2124°N 2.6600°W

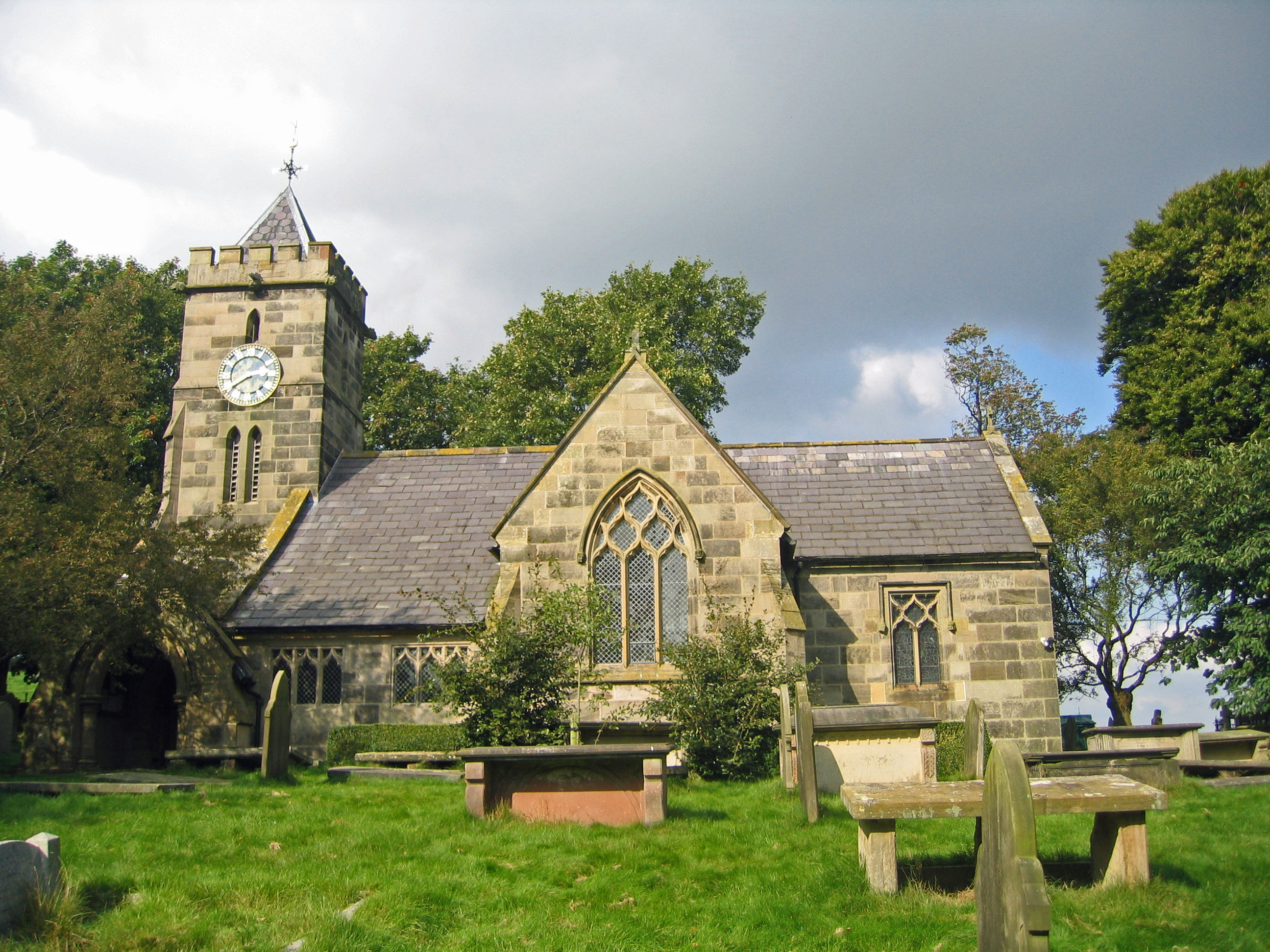
- St Peter's Church, Delamere, from the south

- Location in Cheshire
- OS grid reference: SJ 560 686
- Location: Delamere, Cheshire
- Country: England
- Denomination: Anglican
- Website: A Church Near You

History
- Status: Parish church
- Dedication: St Peter

Architecture
- Functional status: Active
- Heritage designation: Grade II
- Designated: 3 January 1967
- Architect: James Gunnery
- Architectural type: Church
- Style: Gothic Revival
- Groundbreaking: 1817
- Completed: 1915

Specifications
- Materials: Ashlar buff sandstone Welsh slate roof

Administration
- Province: York
- Diocese: Chester
- Archdeaconry: Chester
- Deanery: Middlewich
- Parish: Delamere

Clergy
- Rector: Rev. Angela Asquith

St Peter's Church stands in an isolated position to the south of the village of Delamere, Cheshire, England. The church is recorded in the National Heritage List for England as a designated Grade II listed building. It is an active Anglican parish church in the diocese of Chester, the archdeaconry of Chester and the deanery of Middlewich.

== History ==
The church was built in 1817 to a design by James Gunnery at the expense of the Freemasons. It is said to have been built to celebrate Wellington's victory at the Battle of Waterloo. It was much altered in 1878 and a vestry was added in 1915.

== Architecture ==
=== Exterior ===
The church is built in ashlar buff Manley sandstone with a Welsh slate roof. Its plan consists of a west tower with a south porch, a two-bay nave, a south aisle, short transepts, and a single-bay chancel. It is in Decorated style. The small tower has diagonal buttresses and simple bands at each stage. On the south side is a clock face. The tower has an embattled parapet on a band containing gargoyles. Above this is a pyramidal cap.

=== Interior ===
Beneath the west window is a brass plaque recording the laying of the foundation stone and the architect's name. The stained glass in the east window is dated 1906 and is by Herbert Bryans. The two-manual organ was built by P. Conacher.

== External features ==
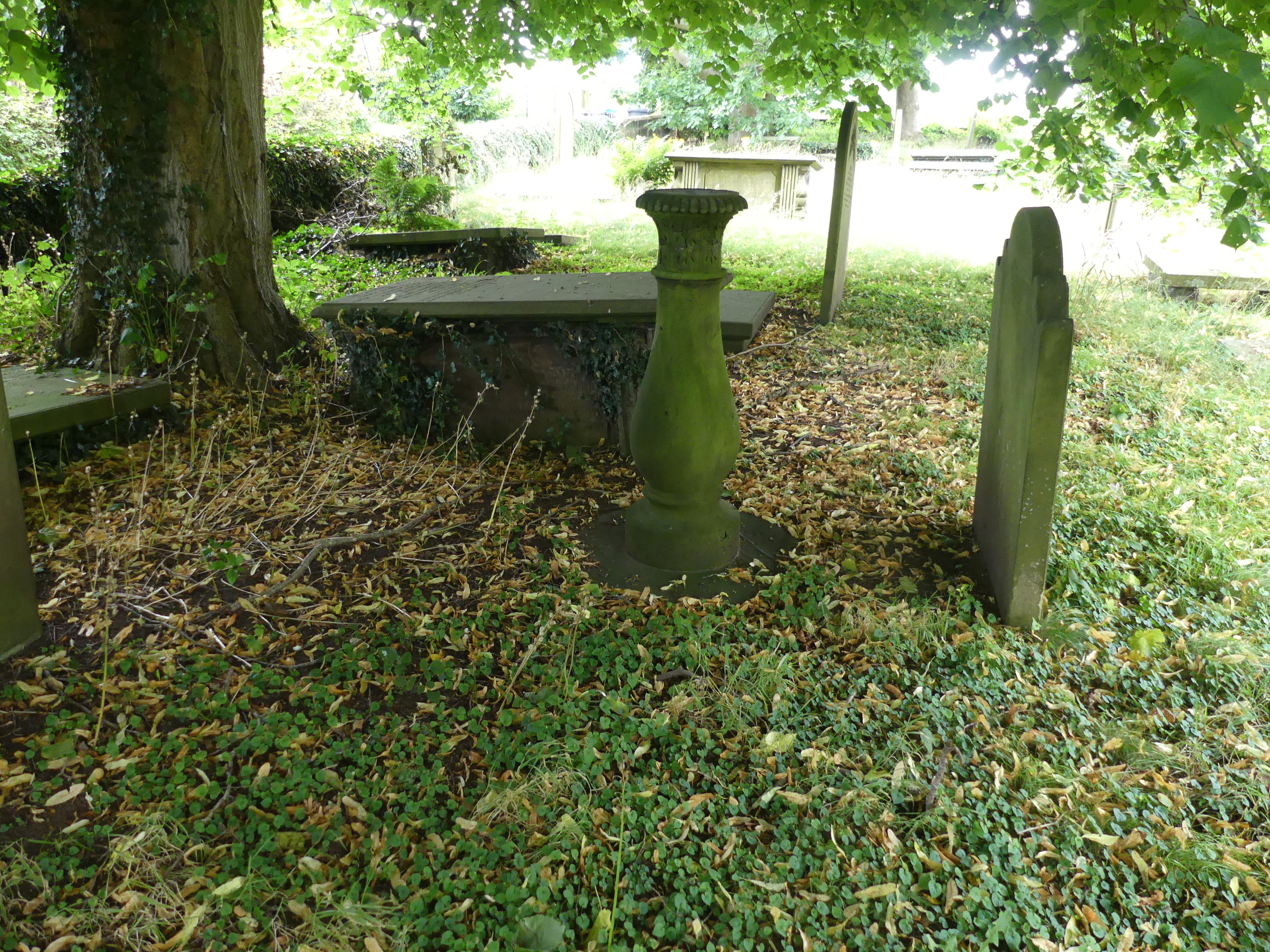
Listed sundial in churchyard

In the churchyard is a buff sandstone sundial dating from the early 19th century. It consists of a bulbous baluster on a circular stone base with a capital of acanthus leaves which carries the original circular plate with italic Roman numerals. It is listed at Grade II. The churchyard also contains the war graves of a soldier of World War I, and a soldier and Royal Air Force officer of World War II.

== See also ==
- Listed buildings in Delamere, Cheshire
