= Hefferston Grange =

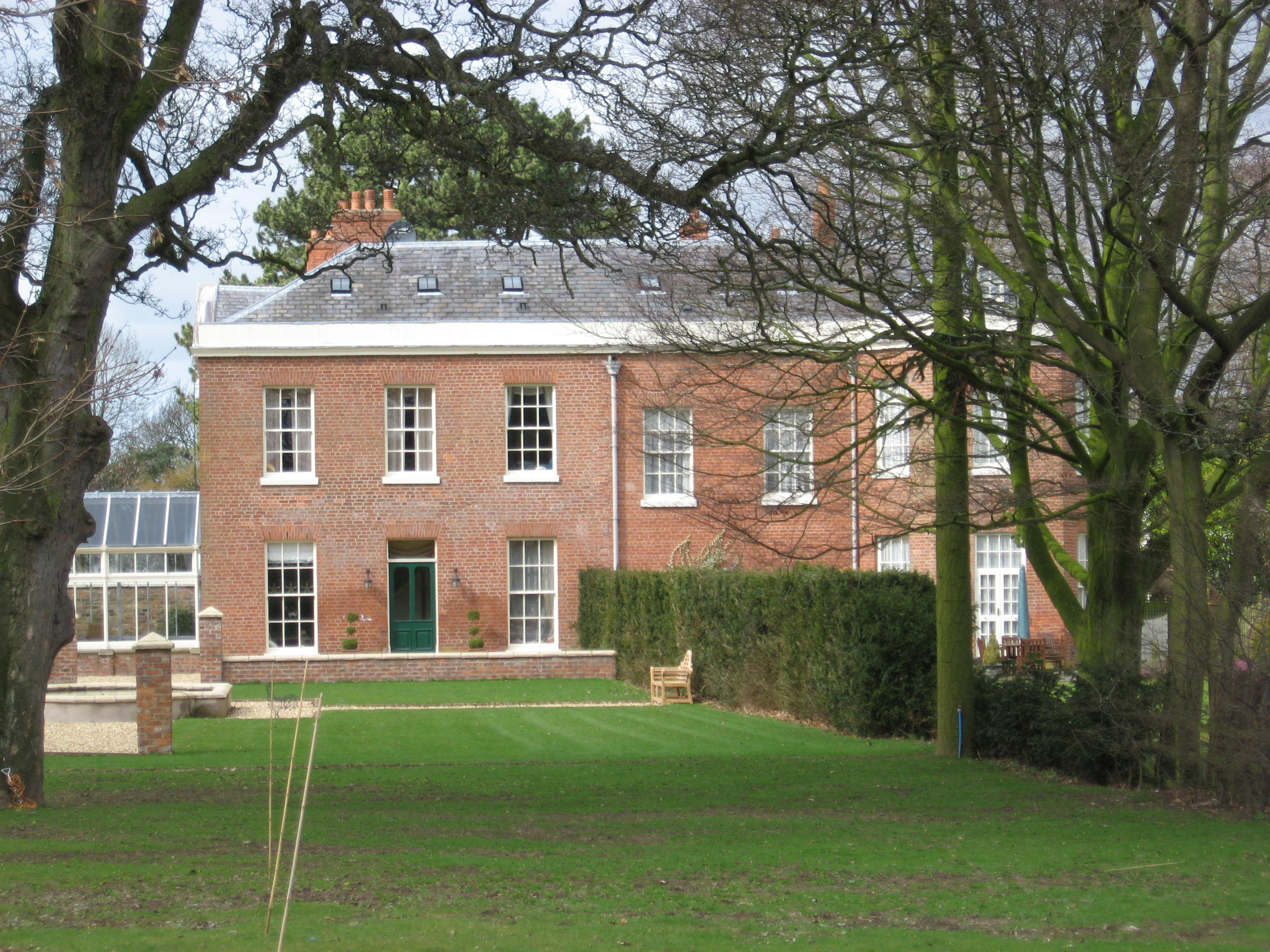
- Hefferston Grange, south front

- Location in Cheshire
- 53.25680°N 2.59491°W
- Location: Weaverham, Cheshire, England
- OS grid reference: SJ 604 735

History
- Built: 1741
- Built for: Philip Henry Warburton

Site notes
- Architectural style: Early Georgian

Listed Building – Grade II*
- Designated: 18 July 1986
- Reference no.: 1287121

Hefferston Grange is a former country house to the southwest of the village of Weaverham, Cheshire, England. The house is recorded in the National Heritage List for England as a designated Grade II* listed building.

== History ==
The house was built in 1741 for Philip Henry Warburton, incorporating parts of an earlier house dating from about 1700. It was enlarged in Neoclassical style for Nicholas Ashton of Woolton Hall in the 1770s. Extensions and alterations were made to the house for Robert Heath in 1876. During the 20th century it became part of the Grange Hospital (formerly Hefferston Grange Sanatorium). This was established in 1921 for the treatment of patients with tuberculosis. The property was sold by the National Health Service in 1986.

== Architecture ==
The house is constructed in orange brick with stone dressings. It has hipped roofs covered in Welsh slate, and has brick chimneys. Its plan is that of a rectangular block. The architectural style is Early Georgian. The entrance front is on the east side; it is symmetrical, in two storeys, and has seven bays. It has a moulded stone plinth, and rusticated quoins. The lateral pair of bays on each side are stepped forward. All the windows in this front are sash windows. Above the doorcase is a frieze of Tudor roses under a moulded architrave and a segmental pediment. Two bays at the right end of the south front are canted. This front has a mixture of sash and casement windows. Attached to the west front is a 19th-century cast iron conservatory with a semicircular end. On the north front is a stone porch. Inside, the ceilings of the staircase and one of the upstairs rooms have Rococo stucco decoration.

== External features ==
To the east of the house is an icehouse. It dates from the late 18th or early 19th century, and is constructed in orange brick covered in earth. The structure is a Grade II listed building.

== See also ==
- Grade II* listed buildings in Cheshire West and Chester
- Listed buildings in Weaverham
