= Winsford and Over railway station =

Former railway station in Cheshire, England

Winsford and Over

General information
- Location: Winsford, Cheshire West and Chester; England
- Coordinates: 53.1950°N 2.5204°W
- Grid reference: SJ653665
- Platforms: 1

Other information
- Status: Disused

History
- Original company: West Cheshire Railway
- Pre-grouping: Cheshire Lines Committee
- Post-grouping: Cheshire Lines Committee; London Midland Region of British Railways

Key dates
- 1 July 1870: Opened
- 1 January 1874: Closed
- 1 May 1886: Reopened
- 1 December 1888: Closed to passengers
- 1 February 1892: Reopened to passengers
- 1 January 1931: Final closure to passengers
- 1 September 1958: Station closed
Location

Winsford and Over was one of three railway stations that served the town of Winsford, in Cheshire, England. The station was the terminus of the Winsford and Over branch, operated by the Cheshire Lines Committee and later British Railways.

== History ==
Originally opening on 1 July 1870, it was used primarily to provide railway access to Winsford's various salt mines. It first closed to passengers on 1 January 1874. It reopened on 1 May 1886, but closed to passengers for the second time on 1 December 1888. Following reopening on 1 February 1892, it was finally closed to passengers on 1 January 1931; the goods service continued until 1958.

Its passenger facilities were fairly basic. The station building was a wooden structure, which was used originally at Northwich railway station.

Preceding station	Disused railways	Following station
Terminus	Cheshire Lines Committee; Winsford and Over branch line	Whitegate

== The site today ==
The station was demolished after closure and the site is now occupied by a small industrial estate. The route of the branch line forms a popular shared-use path called the Whitegate Way.
