= St Mary's Church, Weaverham =

Coordinates: 53.2638°N 2.5758°W

St Mary's Ecumenical Church, Weaverham
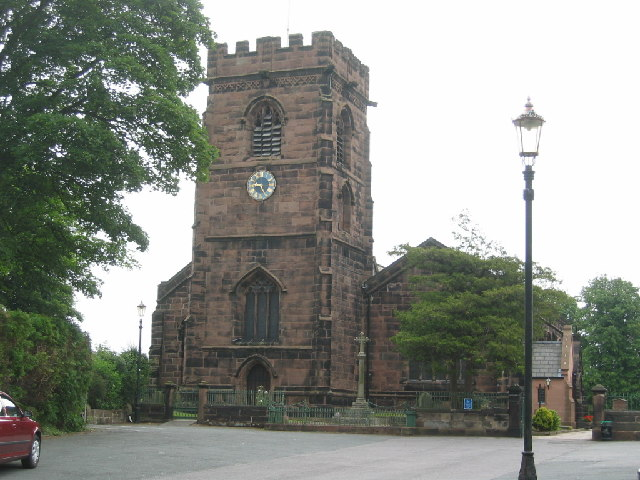
- St Mary's Church, Weaverham, from the west

- Location in Cheshire
- OS grid reference: SJ 616,743
- Location: Weaverham, Cheshire
- Country: England
- Denomination: [Anglican / Methodist LEP]
- Website: https://www.stmarysweaverham.org

History
- Status: Parish church
- Dedication: St Mary the Virgin

Architecture
- Functional status: Active
- Heritage designation: Grade I
- Designated: 3 January 1967
- Architect(s): Anthony Salvin, John Douglas (restorations)
- Architectural type: Church
- Style: Gothic, Gothic Revival

Specifications
- Materials: Red sandstone Welsh slate roof

Administration
- Province: Province of York
- Diocese: Diocese of Chester
- Archdeaconry: Archdeaconry of Chester
- Deanery: Middlewich
- Parish: Weaverham

Clergy
- Vicar: Revd Paul Withington

St Mary's Ecumenical Church is a Church of England / Methodist Local Ecumenical Project in the village of Weaverham, Cheshire, England. The church is the parish church of Weaverham and Acton Bridge and part of the Methodist Northwich and Winsford Circuit. The vision of the church is to share the light and hope of Jesus with the local community. The church building is recorded in the National Heritage List for England as a designated Grade I listed building. It is an active Anglican parish church in the Diocese of Chester, the archdeaconry of Chester and the deanery of Middlewich.

== History ==
A church was present on the site at the time of the Norman Conquest. Edward I gave the advowson of the vicarage to Vale Royal Abbey. After the dissolution of the monasteries, this was given by Henry VIII to the Bishop of Chester. The west tower dates from the middle of the 15th century and the rest of the church from the 16th century. Restorations were carried out in 1855 by Anthony Salvin, and in 1877 by John Douglas, when the porch and vestry were added.

== Architecture ==
=== Exterior ===
The church is built in red sandstone ashlar with a Welsh slate roof. The plan of the church consists of a tower at the west end leading to a five-bay nave and chancel with no architectural division, and north and south aisles terminating in chapels. The church is wider at its west end than at the east end. The chapel at the east end of the south aisle is the Wilbraham (formerly Grange) chapel and that at the east end of the north aisle is the Heath (formerly Crowton) Chapel.

=== Interior ===
Both chapels contain memorials to local families, and both chapels have screens dated 1636. In the chancel is an 18th-century chandelier. The octagonal font stands on a plain column and has an ornate Jacobean wooden cover. The chancel panelling has linenfold carving. The altar table is by Chippendale and has cabriole legs and claw feet. The altar rails, originally in the church, were moved to become the back staircase of Hefferston Grange, but have now been restored in the church. The parish chest is early Georgian. The sanctuary chairs come from the William and Mary period. The sidesmen's pew re-used wood from the previous three-decker pulpit which was dated 1774. In the church is a stained glass window presented by John Douglas to commemorate his parents and his sisters. The two-manual organ was made by Walker in 1951. There is a ring of six bells. Two bells dated 1718 are by Abraham Rudhall II, two dated 1796 are by Thomas & James Bilbie and the other two dated 1875 are by Mears & Stainbank of the Whitechapel Bell Foundry. The parish registers begin in 1576 and the churchwardens' accounts in 1630.

== External features ==
In the churchyard are fragments of a Roman road. It also contains the war graves of nineteen Commonwealth service personnel, ten of World War I and nine of World War II.

== See also ==
- Grade I listed buildings in Cheshire West and Chester
- Grade I listed churches in Cheshire
- Listed buildings in Weaverham
- List of church restorations, amendments and furniture by John Douglas
- List of church restorations and alterations by Anthony Salvin
