= Methodist Church, Weaverham =

Coordinates: 53.2624°N 2.5812°W

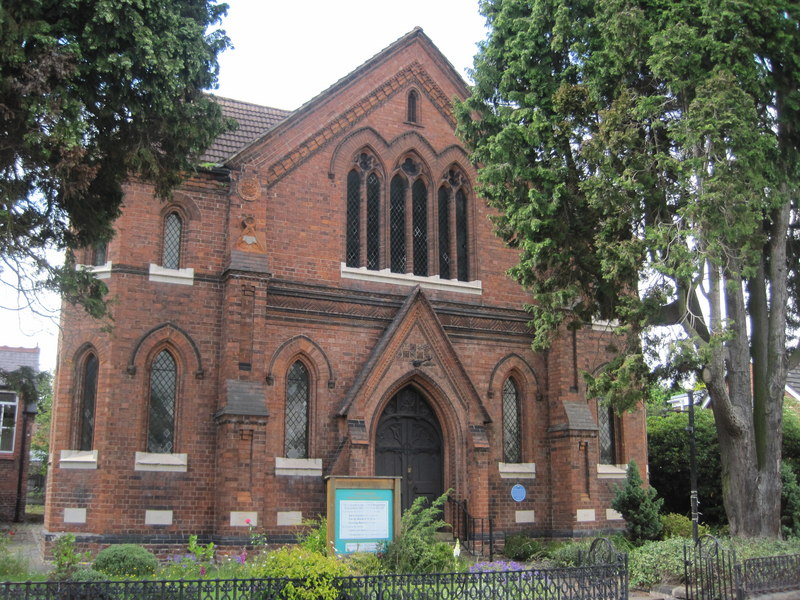
- Entrance front of the Methodist Church, Weaverham

- Location in Cheshire
- OS grid reference: SJ 613 741
- Location: Forest Street, Weaverham, Cheshire
- Country: England
- Denomination: Methodist

Architecture
- Heritage designation: Grade II
- Designated: 18 July 1986
- Architect: Edmund Kirby (?)
- Completed: 1878

Specifications
- Materials: Brick with terracotta dressings Tiled roof

Administration
- District: Chester and Stoke

The Methodist Church, Weaverham, was an active Methodist church located in Forest Street, Weaverham, Cheshire, England. It was in the Northwich and Winsford Circuit of the Chester and Stoke District. The church is recorded in the National Heritage List for England as a designated Grade II listed building.

Some Methodist services are now held at nearby St Mary's Church. Alternatively, there are Methodist Churches in Acton Bridge, Hartford and Bartington, listed on www.midcheshirecircuit.org.uk

Weaverham Methodist Church is currently a nursery and pre-school, Evolution Childcare.

== History ==
The church is dated 1878, and was designed possibly by Edmund Kirby. It replaced an earlier chapel built in 1835 in Chapel Street.

== Architecture ==
Built in orange English bond brick, the church has terracotta dressings, and a roof of Marley tiles. It has a T-shaped plan. The entrance front facing the road has two storeys and is in three bays. The lateral bays are canted and contain lancet windows in each face and in each storey. The central bay has a gabled doorway framed by buttresses. On each side of the doorway is a lancet window. The upper storey contains a three light window under a gable. Inside the church is a gallery of tiered seats, and a central pulpit decorated with floral panels on the front, and pierced balustrades on the sides.

== See also ==
- Listed buildings in Weaverham
