= Alan Mayers =

English footballer

Personal information
- Date of birth: 20 April 1937 (age 89)
- Place of birth: Delamere, Cheshire, England
- Position: Outside forward

Senior career*
Years	Team	Apps	(Gls)
c. 1954–1956	Chester	1	(0)
- * Club domestic league appearances and goals

Alan Mayers (born 20 April 1937) is an English former footballer who played as an outside forward. Born in Delamere, Cheshire, he made one appearance for Chester in The Football League, wearing the number seven shirt in a 2–1 defeat away to Scunthorpe United in April 1956. The previous season, he had played for the club in the Welsh Cup final against Barry Town, helping Chester to a 1–1 draw at neutral Wrexham, but he did not play in the replay as Chester lost to their non-league opponents.
