= Delamere, Cheshire =

Village in Cheshire, England

Coordinates: 53.217°N 2.659°W

Delamere
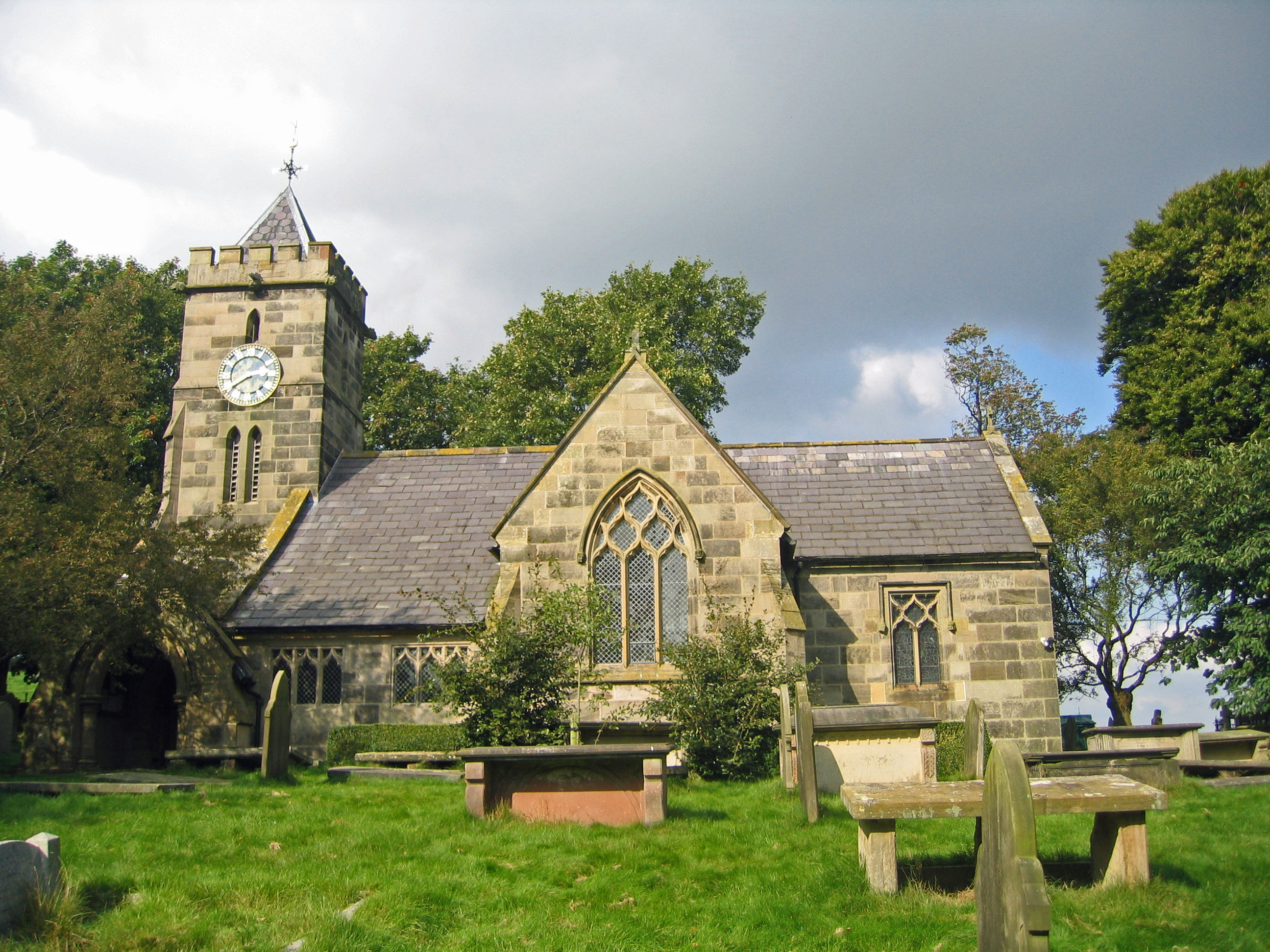
- St Peter's Church, Delamere

- Location within Cheshire
- OS grid reference: SJ563686
- Civil parish: Delamere and Oakmere
- Unitary authority: Cheshire West and Chester
- Ceremonial county: Cheshire
- Region: North West
- Country: England
- Sovereign state: United Kingdom
- Post town: NORTHWICH
- Postcode district: CW8
- Dialling code: 01606
- Police: Cheshire
- Fire: Cheshire
- Ambulance: North West
- UK Parliament: Chester South and Eddisbury

Delamere is a village and former civil parish, now in the parish of Delamere and Oakmere, within the unitary authority area of Cheshire West and Chester, in the ceremonial county of Cheshire, England. It is approximately 7 miles (11 km) west of Northwich. The population of the civil parish taken at the 2011 census was 1,025. The name of the village comes from the French de la mer "of the sea". The civil parish was abolished on 1 April 2015 to form "Delamere and Oakmere"; parts also went to Kelsall, Utkinton and Cotebrook and Willington.

The civil parish was well known for the Delamere Forest, an expanse of oak, pine and sycamore trees which forms the largest woodland in Cheshire. It includes the hills of Old Pale and Eddisbury Hill, part of the Mid Cheshire Ridge.

There are several cafés, including the Station House Café at Delamere railway station and Delamere Café in Delamere Forest. Other services include a primary school (Delamere C of E Academy), shop (Delamere Stores), community centre and public house, the Vale Royal Abbey Arms on the A556.

Gallery of images of Delamere
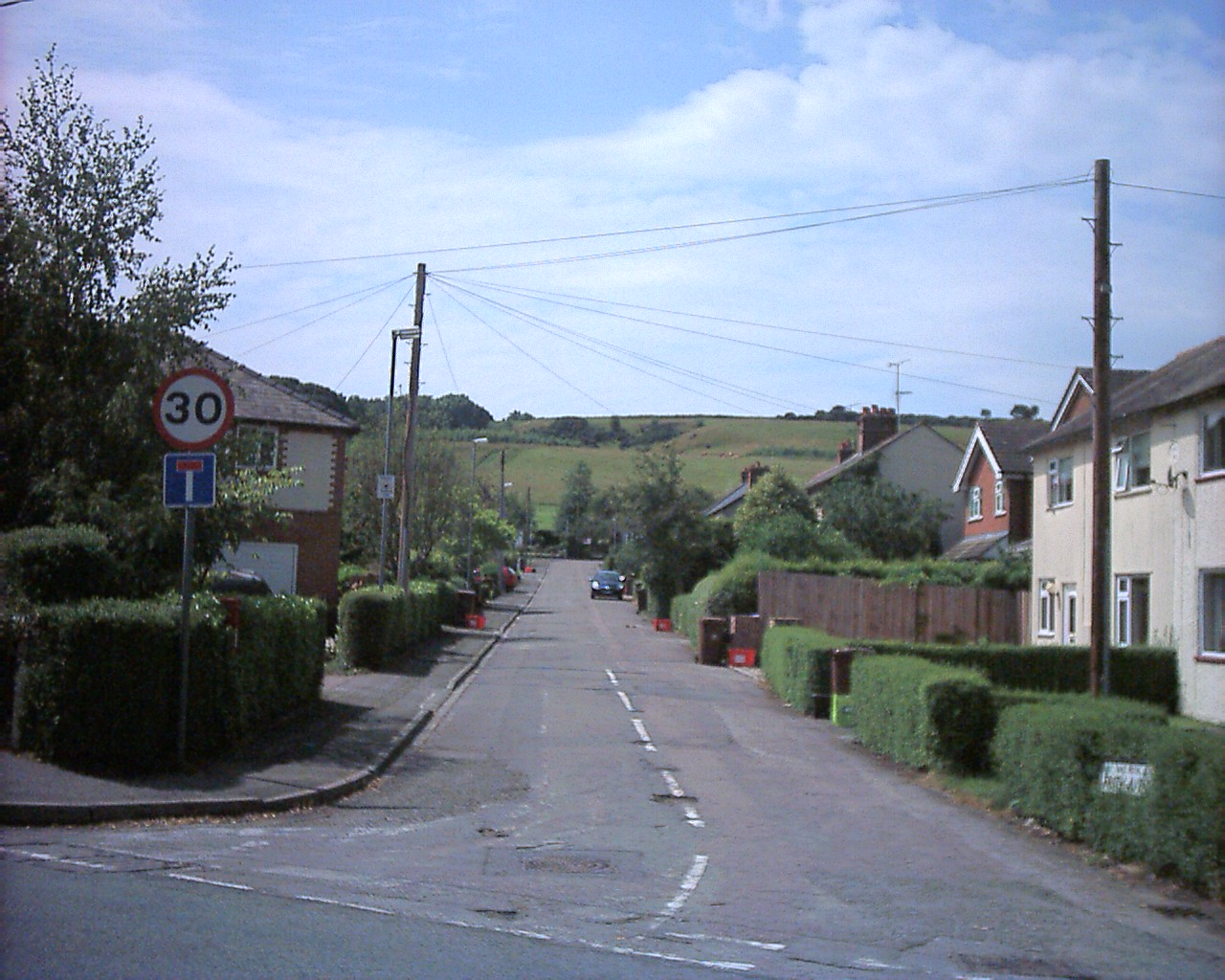
Frith Avenue

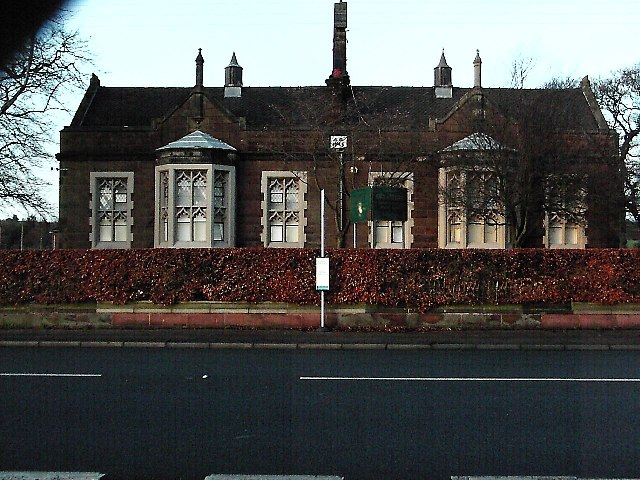
Delamere school

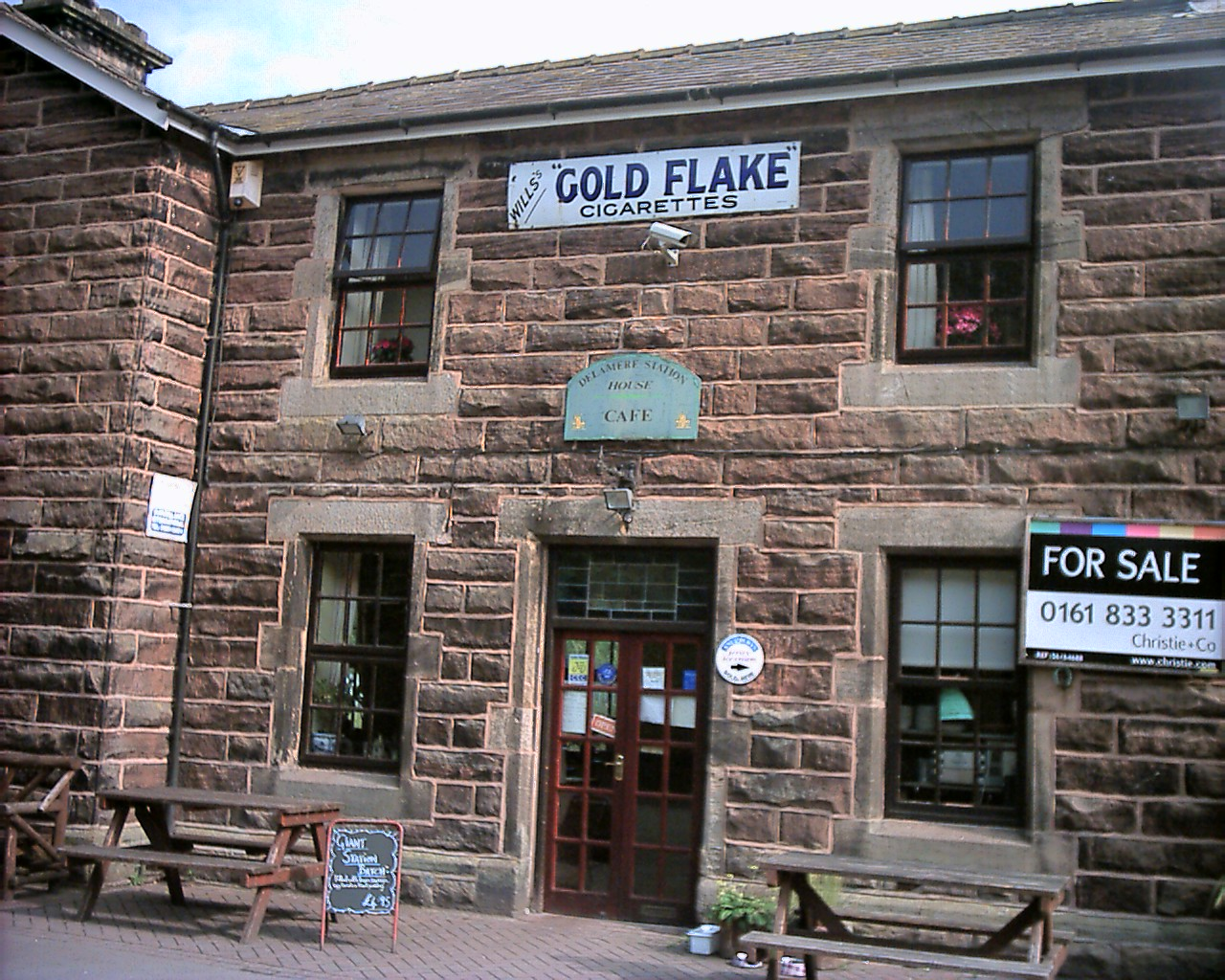
Station house

== Transport ==
Delamere is served by Delamere railway station which opened on 22 June 1870. There are regular stopping services to both Chester and Manchester Piccadilly

== Geodesy ==
On Pale Heights (National Grid SJ543696) was the origin (meridian) of the first Ordnance Survey one inch mapping of the whole of the United Kingdom.

== Notable people ==
- Alan Mayers (b. 1937), English footballer
- Henry Wilbraham (1825–1883), English mathematician

== See also ==
- Listed buildings in Delamere, Cheshire
- St Peter's Church, Delamere
