= Abbotsford, West Sussex =

Neighbourhood of Burgess Hill, West Sussex, England

Coordinates: 50.96°N 00.14°W

Abbotsford
- Location within West Sussex
- OS grid reference: TQ303209
- Civil parish: Burgess Hill
- District: Mid Sussex
- Shire county: West Sussex
- Region: South East
- Country: England
- Sovereign state: United Kingdom
- Post town: BURGESS HILL
- Postcode district: RH15
- Dialling code: 01444
- Police: Sussex
- Fire: West Sussex
- Ambulance: South East Coast
- UK Parliament: Mid Sussex

Abbotsford is a settlement in West Sussex, England. Although once of a distinct identity, the name is now rarely used to describe the area and it would more likely be described as the northern outskirts of Burgess Hill. However, the name still exists in the form of a farm (Little Abbotsford) and on Ordnance Survey maps of the area. Until recently a special school located here was known as Abbotsford School, but has since been renamed as The Bridge.
