= Listed buildings in Weaverham =

Weaverham is a civil parish in Cheshire West and Chester, England. Apart from the village of Weaverham, the parish is entirely rural, and contains 22 buildings that are recorded in the National Heritage List for England as designated listed buildings. Most of the buildings are related to houses or farming, and many of the cottages originating in the 17th century are basically timber-framed. Buildings in other categories are two churches, a public house, and the former grammar school.

In 2009, Weaverham History Society, in association with The Weaverham Trust and Vale Royal Borough Council, installed 15 blue plaques on listed properties around the village, creating a 1.3-mile (2.1 km) heritage walk described on a leaflet and on interpretation boards within the village.

== Key ==
Grade	Criteria
Grade I	Buildings of exceptional interest, sometimes considered to be internationally important.
Grade II*	Particularly important buildings of more than special interest.
Grade II	Buildings of national importance and special interest.

== Buildings ==
Name and location	Photograph	Date	Notes	Grade
St Mary's Church; 53.2638°N 2.5758°W		Mid 15th century	A church has been present on the site since before the Norman conquest. The oldest part of the present church is the tower, with the rest dating from the 16th century. It was restored in 1855 by Anthony Salvin, and in 1877 by John Douglas. Its style is late Perpendicular. The font consists of a 13th-century column carrying a bowl from the 14th or 15th century, and a Jacobean cover.	I
Raintub Cottage; 53.2635°N 2.5788°W		17th century or earlier	Located at 11 Church Street, this is basically a timber-framed building with crucks. It was rebuilt in the 20th century copying its earlier appearance. The cottage has been encased in brick, and has a thatched roof. It is in one storey with an attic, and has 20th-century mullioned windows and a gabled dormer.	II
Grammar school 53.2609°N 2.5835°W		1638	The grammar school was converted into a house in about 1920. It is constructed in large blocks of red sandstone, and has a slate roof. The building is in two storeys, and has a three-bay front. The windows have three lights and are mullioned.	II
24 West Road; 53.2623°N 2.5874°W		Early-mid 17th century	The cottage was extended in the 19th century. It is timber-framed with brick nogging on a stone base; the extensions are in brick. The cottage is in a single storey with an attic, and has a four-bay front. The windows are casements and dormers.	II
42 Forest Street; 53.2609°N 2.5839°W	—	Mid 17th century	The cottage is timber-framed on a stone base with a thatched roof. It is in a single storey; its south front has two bays. The windows are replaced casements. In the 20th century an extension was added to the rear; this has applied timber framing.	II
3 and 5 Church Lane; 53.2633°N 2.5765°W		17th century	A cottage that is partly timber-framed and partly in rendered brick, with a thatched roof. It is in two storeys and has a three-bay front. The windows are casements. The cottage was altered during the 19th century.	II
12 High Street; 53.2630°N 2.5807°W		17th century	The building started as a barn, it was then converted into a house, and later into a shop. It is timber-framed with brick nogging on a tall stone base. The building has a long rectangular plan, it is in two storeys, and has a four-bay front. It has a 19th-century shop front with a doorway between two windows. The other windows are casements.	II
13 High Street; 53.2629°N 2.5811°W		17th century	Originally a timber-framed house, this has been converted into four commercial units, and the timber framing has been rendered. The roof is in slate. The building has two storeys, and is in four bays. Windows include three-light casements.	II
Ivy House; 53.2636°N 2.5806°W		17th century	Some timber framing remains in the rear wall. The rest of the house was remodelled and refaced with brick in the 19th century, and a porch was added in the 20th century..The house has a slate roof. It is in two storeys with a four-bay front. The porch is in Ruabon brick with stone dressings.	II
3 and 5 High Street; 53.2628°N 2.5802°W		Late 17th century	Originating as a house, this was later converted into a cottage and a shop. It is timber-framed with brick nogging on a stone base. It is in two storeys, and has a four-bay front. The windows include a three-light horizontally-sliding sash window and a two-light casement.	II
Poplar Cottage; 53.2627°N 2.5797°W		Late 17th century	Located on High Street, the cottage is timber-framed with brick nogging on a stone base, and has a thatched roof. It is in 1 1 1/2 storeys with a three-bay front. The windows are casements and lunettes.	II
Gorstage Farmhouse; 53.2525°N 2.5856°W	—	Early 18th century	The farmhouse has a rectangular plan, and is constructed in brick with a slate roof. There are two storeys and an attic, and the south front has four bays. The windows are casements. Inside, the central room has an inglenook fireplace with stone seats and a chamfered bressumer.	II
Grange Lane Farmhouse; 53.2516°N 2.5929°W	—	Early 18th century	Extensions were made during the 19th century. The farmhouse is constructed in brick with slate roofs. It has an L-shaped plan, and is in two storeys with an attic. The front is in three bays, and the windows are casements.	II
Hefferston Grange; 53.2568°N 2.5949°W		1741	This was built as a country house, incorporating parts of an earlier house, and was enlarged in the 1770s. During the 20th century it was used as a hospital for the treatment of tuberculosis, and has since been converted into apartments. The building is in early Georgian style, and is constructed in brick with stone dressings and a slate roof. The windows are sashes. Internally, some of the rooms have stucco decoration in Rococo style.	II*
Stables, Hefferston Grange; 53.2572°N 2.5955°W	—	Early-mid 18th century	Constructed in brick with slate roofs, the building has stone dressings including flush quoins. In the centre of the roof is an octagonal wooden cupola with a clock and an ogee roof surmounted by a weathervane.	II
14 and 16 High Street; 53.2631°N 2.5810°W		Early-mid 18th century	Alterations were made to the two houses in the middle of the 19th century. They are constructed in brick with slate roofs. The houses have two storeys with a six-bay front. The windows are sashes.	II
Wheatsheaf Hotel; 53.2629°N 2.5804°W		Early-mid 18th century	The public house is located at 2 High Street. Extensive additions were made to the rear during the 19th and 20th centuries. The original part is built in brick with rusticated quoins and slate roofs. It has three storeys, and has a symmetrical three-bay front. The windows are casements.	II
6 and 8 Church Street; 53.2632°N 2.5793°W		1772	Initially this was a terrace of three cottages, later converted into two. It is constructed in brick with a slate roof, in two storeys, with a six-bay front. The windows are mullioned and transomed, and the two surviving doors have semicircular heads and fanlights.	II
Icehouse, Hefferston Grange; 53.25685°N 2.59411°W	—	Late 18th-early 19th century	The icehouse is constructed in brick and covered in earth. Internally is a circular chamber with a doorway and a ladder that is possibly original.	II
Gorstage Hall; 53.2451°N 2.5916°W	—	Early-mid 19th century	A symmetrical country house with a square plan in two storeys. It is constructed in brick with sandstone dressings and rusticated quoins on a stone plinth. It has a slated hipped roof. On the garden front are two two-storey canted bay windows. The other windows are sashes. The entrance front is rendered.	II
Methodist Church; 53.2624°N 2.5812°W		1878	The church replaced an earlier church nearby, and was designed possibly by Edmund Kirby. It is constructed in brick with terracotta dressings. Inside is a tiered gallery and a centrally-placed pulpit.	II
War memorial 53.26369°N 2.57611°W	—	1921	The war memorial is in the churchyard of St Mary's Church. It is in Devonshire granite and consists of a foliated cross with a moulded collar on a tapering octagonal shaft. The shaft rises from a two-stage octagonal base on a square step. There are inscriptions and the names of those lose on the base and the step.	II
