= Round Tower Lodge =

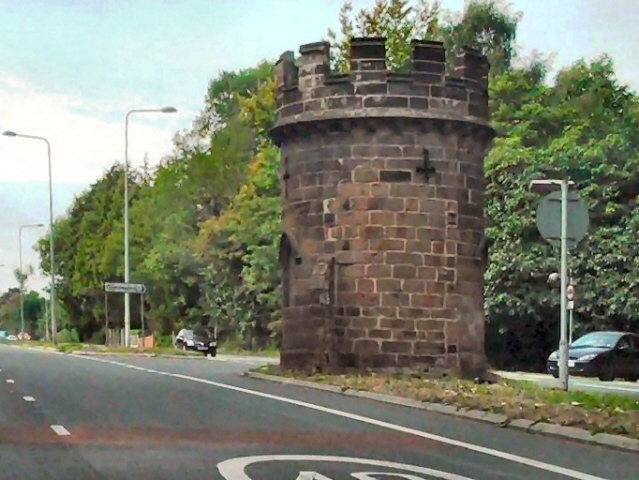
- Round Tower Lodge in 2010

- Location in Cheshire
- 53.23373°N 2.58379°W
- Location: Sandiway, Cheshire, England
- OS grid reference: SJ 611 709

Listed Building – Grade II
- Designated: 18 July 1986
- Reference no.: 1227728

The Round Tower Lodge, also known simply as the Round Tower, is situated in the central reservation of the A556 road in Sandiway, Cheshire, England. It is recorded in the National Heritage List for England as a designated Grade II listed building.

The tower is all that survives of a gate lodge to the house of Vale Royal Abbey. The lodge was built on the main Chester to Manchester road as an entrance to Vale Royal's New Park and was linked to the house by a driveway containing a second lodge building, Monkey Lodge. The tower is a circular, two-storey building constructed of sandstone. On top of the tower is a crenellated parapet. On the south-west elevation is a planked and studded oak door built into a Gothic-style arch. There are also three Gothic-style windows. Above the door and windows are four unglazed crossloops. To the east of the tower is a short stub wall which used to be part of a square single-storey room which was integral with the tower's construction. It was built in the early 19th century but the exact date of its construction has not been recorded. Also the name of the architect is unknown.

The gate to the house lay to the west of the tower the posts of which were connected to the lodge by a low boundary wall surmounted by iron railings. In late 19th and early 20th century additions were made to the eastern room. There was an extension consisting of another square stone structure and there is evidence of yet a further extension which was probably a lean-to shed-like structure. In 1871 the lodge was tenanted by a shepherd named William Ree who lived there with his family. The last occupants, in the 1920s, were Hughie Preston and his wife. The tower itself provided the main living quarters, the first extension was the bedroom and the extension beyond that was the kitchen.

Towards the end of the 19th century New Park was renamed Pettypool Park and after World War I it became Sandiway Golf Course. Other than the tower, the lodge buildings were demolished when the main road was converted into a four-lane dual carriageway in the 1930s, the tower becoming stranded in the central reservation when the southern end of the Northwich by-pass was completed in 1958. The old road was retained as the eastbound carriageway and the westbound carriageway was added to the south of the tower. It was owned by the Highways Agency who carried out repairs which were completed in 2002. It was a Grade II listed building and is included in the Sandiway Conservation Area.

On 14 November 2013, the Round Tower Lodge was badly damaged when a car collided with it. The tower was declared to be unsafe, and was demolished. A social media campaign to rebuild the tower was subsequently started by local residents. In response, Cheshire West and Chester Council stated that the tower materials had been stored and a reconstruction was already planned; costs were to be pursued from the driver's insurance company. After renovation, rebuilding of the tower was completed in 2015.

== See also ==
- Listed buildings in Cuddington, Cheshire
