= Abbotsford Station, Queensland =

Mitchell grass downs block near Stamford, Queensland, Australia

Coordinates: 21.4022118°S 143.4554402°E

Charles John Burdekin Abbott, grazier, Abbotsford, Stamford

Abbotsford Station is a 20,000-acre (8,100 ha) Mitchell grass downs block near Stamford, Queensland, Australia. The block was balloted on 7 November 1912 off the Stamfordham block of the home station of Katandra. It was the western portion of the block called Sloane Creek, so named after the creek that runs through the block and into the Flinders River. This block also had a sub-artesian bore (completed in 1904), which was situated centrally on the land making it the prime block in the 1912 ballot process.

Abbotsford Station is situated 87 kilometres (54 mi) south-west of Hughenden, and 24 kilometres (15 mi) west of Stamford, which is on the Hughenden-Winton Road (Kennedy Developmental Road).

The successful applicant for the block was Charles John Burdekin (Chas) Abbott (born 8 February 1878), whose family had land interests in Charters Towers at Fanning River and Ingham at Elma Grove.

== See also ==
- List of ranches and stations
