= A556 road =

Road in Cheshire

A556

- Looking west near Hartford

Route information
- Maintained by Cheshire East Council; Cheshire West and Chester Council; National Highways
- Length: 19 mi (31 km)

Major junctions
- Southwest end: Delamere; 53.211468°N 2.680578°W
- A54, Delamere; A49, Oakmere A559, Hartford A533, Davenham A530, Rudheath A559, Lostock Gralam M6 / A5033, Tabley; A50, Mere A5034, Millington M56 / A56, Bowdon
- Northeast end: Bowdon; 53.368722°N 2.386351°W

Location
- Country: United Kingdom
- Counties: Cheshire
- Primary destinations: Northwich

Road network
- Roads in the United Kingdom; Motorways; A and B road zones
← A555	→ A557

The A556 is a road in England which extends from the village of Delamere in Cheshire West and Chester to the Bowdon Interchange in Cheshire East, bordering Greater Manchester. The road contains a mixture of single and dual carriageway sections and forms a large part of the route between Manchester and Chester. It also acts as a major access route to Chester/North Wales to the west and to Manchester to the east for the conurbation of towns and villages around the Dane Valley centering on Winsford and Northwich. The central part, which forms the Northwich Bypass between Davenham and Lostock Gralam, suffers because of the amount of commuter traffic from this area. The part of the route between the M6 motorway Junction 19 and the M56 motorway Junction 7 is a major route into Manchester and has been recently upgraded to a four-lane dual carriageway.

The road is frequently congested, carrying approximately 80,000 vehicles per day in 2020 between the M6 and M56 and 45,000 vehicles per day From the A533 Junction for Winsford and Northwich to the M6. The road has a high accident record; between 1998 and 2005, there were around 200 accidents, resulting in 5 fatalities and 39 people being seriously injured.

This road occupies part of the intended route for the original M60 motorway which would have provided a motorway bypass for Sale, Altrincham and Stretford. The plans were revived as the A556(M) but the road was finally built as the current all-purpose A556. The former A6144(M) which started at the M63 (now M60) Junction 8 occupies another section of the planned M60.

== Route description ==
The route begins in the south of Manchester at junction 7 of the M56. It then runs in a southwesterly direction towards Chester, joining the A54 near Delamere.

At its northern limit, the A556 comes as a spur off the M56 at Junction 7 where it also connects with the A56 at the large interchange roundabout. The A56 continues towards central Manchester via Altrincham. The A556 runs southwest as a new (2017) dual carriageway with a limited-access junction at Millington and another where it crosses the A50. The dual carriageway goes on to connect to the roundabout at Junction 19 of the M6.

The A556 continues as a four-laned single carriageway (i.e. with no physical separation between the traffic flows) in a southwesterly direction to another set of traffic lights. A left (easterly) turn here joins the A5033 towards Knutsford. The road continues curving more towards a westerly direction and undulates on its way towards Northwich with only minor junctions until traffic lights for the junction with Plumley Moor Road (leading towards Plumley) by The Smoker pub.

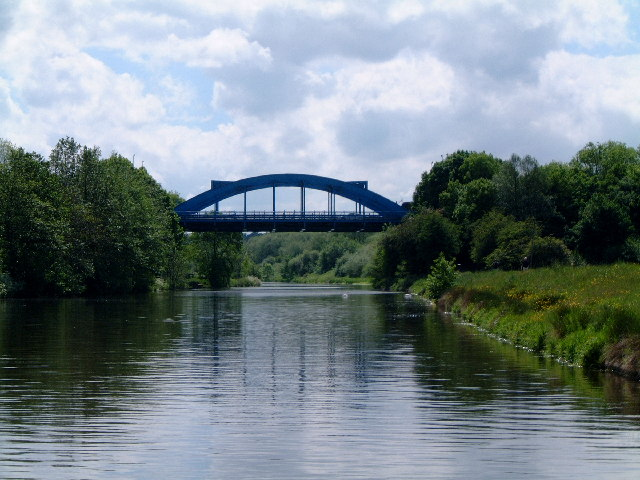
Hartford Bridge (or 'Blue Bridge') carries the A556 across the Weaver Navigation.

At the junction with the A559 just outside the village of Lostock Gralam, the road becomes dual carriageway again (it gains a central reservation) and turns south to bypass the town of Northwich. As the road skirts the south of Northwich, there is a roundabout with the A530 (south towards Middlewich); traffic lights for the Gadbrook Park industrial estate and another roundabout (the 'Davenham' roundabout) for the A533. This is where the bulk of the traffic joins/leaves the road for Winsford, with the westbound carriageway having an off slip road to the A533 South to relieve traffic on the roundabout and Kingsmead Crossroads the same, with the eastbound carriageway having an on slip from the A533 and the crossroads. This section of road was constructed before World War II but not opened to traffic: in 1944 it was used to store tanks and artillery in preparation for the Normandy landings (D-day). The road then crosses the River Weaver by an iron bridge, Hartford Bridge, known locally as the 'Blue Bridge', before heading in a westerly direction to the village of Sandiway near Cuddington.

The road through the village is limited to 40 miles per hour (64 km/h) and has traffic light junctions with Dalefords Lane/School Lane and the A49. Through Sandiway the road also becomes a two-lane carriageway and continues as such to its end. As the road enters Sandiway, the Round Tower Lodge can be seen stranded in the central reservation of the road.

After the A49 junction the road becomes delimited and turns to a southwesterly route past Oakmere and into a 50 miles per hour (80 km/h) limit for the junction with the B5152 that leads north to Delamere and Delamere Forest. The road rises up to finish at a junction with the A54 that continues towards Kelsall and Chester. This junction does not obviously mark the end of the A556 since traffic on the A556 has right of way and traffic on the A54 has to give way to join.

== Recent improvements ==
Work began in November 2014 to build a four-lane dual carriageway bypass between junction 19 of the M6 at Mere and junction 7 of the M56 at Bowdon. The new road bypasses Mere, Bucklow Hill, Millington and Rostherne and provides a strategic link for traffic heading between Greater Manchester and the south. It cost £192 million and opened on 6 March 2017. The old bypassed route, which has been designated as B5569, has been blocked off at its south end between Swains Farm and the A556/M6 junction. Old Hall Lane (which ran from Tableybrook Farm, over its own bridge over the M6, and joined the A556 opposite Swains Farm) has been re-routed and now joins the bypassed old A556 further north.

The A556 had previously been considered for upgrade to motorway status, but this was rejected in 2003 by the Secretary of State for Transport.

In 2017 a junction improvement was completed around the Davenham area to enable vehicles to turn safely onto Hartford Road coming from Hartford/Chester and also to allow for housing developments to have Trunk Route Access.

In 2020/2021 a further junction improvement costing around £3m was completed for the Gadbrook Park Junction in Rudheath. This will involve creating two extra slip roads, extra lanes on all approaches and extending existing turning lanes to help cut congestion by 14% in the area.
