= Weaverham =

Village in Cheshire, England

Coordinates: 53.262°N 2.577°W

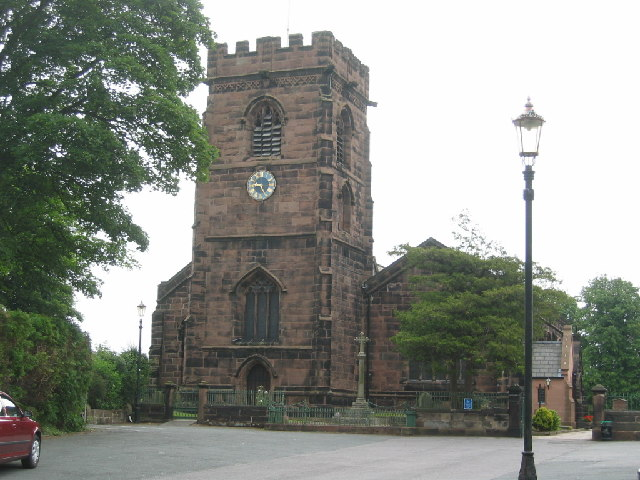
- St Mary's Church, Weaverham

- Location within Cheshire
- Population: 6,391
- OS grid reference: SJ616742
- Civil parish: Weaverham
- Unitary authority: Cheshire West and Chester
- Ceremonial county: Cheshire
- Region: North West
- Country: England
- Sovereign state: United Kingdom
- Post town: NORTHWICH
- Postcode district: CW8
- Dialling code: 01606
- Police: Cheshire
- Fire: Cheshire
- Ambulance: North West
- UK Parliament: Chester South and Eddisbury

Weaverham is a village and civil parish in the borough of Cheshire West and Chester and the ceremonial county of Cheshire in England. Just off the A49, it is just to the west of Northwich and south of the River Weaver, and has a population of 6,589, decreasing to 6,391 at the 2011 UK Census.

Weaverham is also home to the Anglican Church of St Mary, the Roman Catholic church of St Bede and the Methodist church of All Saints. From September 2011, the Storehouse Church also meets weekly in Weaverham.

The schools in Weaverham include the following: three primary schools: St. Bede's Roman Catholic Primary School, Weaverham Forest Primary School and Nursery, and Weaverham Primary Academy, formerly Wallerscote Community Primary School. There is also a SEN school, The Russett School.

Weaverham is adjacent to Owley Wood, part of the Mersey Forest. The wood extends for over 5 hectares (12 acres) along the River Weaver valley and is named after the tawny owls which inhabit the area.

== Governance ==
An electoral ward in the name of Weaver and Cuddington exists. This covers both parishes and the surrounding area. The total population of the ward at the 2011 UK Census was 12,779.

== Notable people ==
- Audrey Beecham (1915 in Weaverham – 1989), English poet, teacher and historian
- Albert Johnson (1920 in Weaverham – 2011), professional footballer who played as an outside right for Everton, Chesterfield and Witton Albion
- Peter Gammond (1925 - 2019), British music critic, writer, journalist, musician, poet, and artist; lived in Weaverham from 1930 to 1950

== Freedom of the Parish ==
The following people and military units have received the Freedom of the Parish of Weaverham.

=== Individuals ===
- Councillor John Freeman: 19 May 2025.

== See also ==
- Listed buildings in Weaverham
- St Mary's Church, Weaverham
