= Cuddington, Eddisbury =

Village in Cheshire, England

Coordinates: 53.240°N 2.600°W

Cuddington
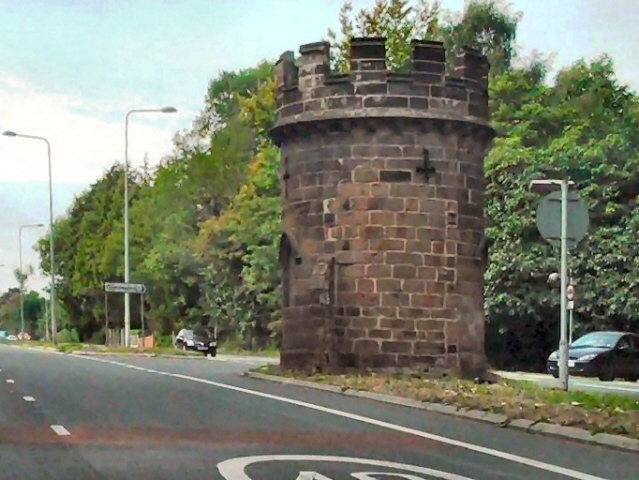
- The Round Tower Lodge, Sandiway

- Location within Cheshire
- Population: 5,333 (2011)
- OS grid reference: SJ601716
- Civil parish: Cuddington
- Unitary authority: Cheshire West and Chester
- Ceremonial county: Cheshire
- Region: North West
- Country: England
- Sovereign state: United Kingdom
- Post town: NORTHWICH
- Postcode district: CW8
- Dialling code: 01606
- Police: Cheshire
- Fire: Cheshire
- Ambulance: North West
- UK Parliament: Chester South and Eddisbury

Cuddington is a civil parish and rural village in the unitary authority of Cheshire West and Chester and the ceremonial county of Cheshire, England, about 4 miles west of Northwich and 13 miles east of Chester.

Within the civil parish of Cuddington are two villages: Cuddington and Sandiway. Sandiway was transferred from Weaverham civil parish in 1936.

== Origins ==
The name Cuddington is Anglo Saxon and derives from the 'tun of Cuda' which translates to the 'people of Cuda'. Cuddington was designated as a township in the 7th century when the then Archbishop of Canterbury (Theodore) introduced the parochial system within the Parish of Weaverham. Cuddington's church was first set up as a chapel of ease. In ancient times the village was famed for its medicinal spring, which has since been lost.

Cuddington and Sandiway have been villages since Delamere Forest covered an area from the southern boundary of Frodsham and the Mersey all the way towards Tarporley. There is a Bronze Age burial ground in Norley, another local village, and Iron Age hillforts at Eddisbury and Oakmere. The ancient highway of Peytefinsty, linking Weaverham with Tarporley and a Roman road run by the village.

Prior to 1935 the centre of Cuddington was on top of the high ground near to what is now Delamere Park but in that year it merged with Bryn (meaning 'hill' which was between Cuddington and Sandiway), Sandiway and parts of Gorstage becoming the ecclesiastical and civil parish, Cuddington and Sandiway.

== Vale Royal Abbey ==
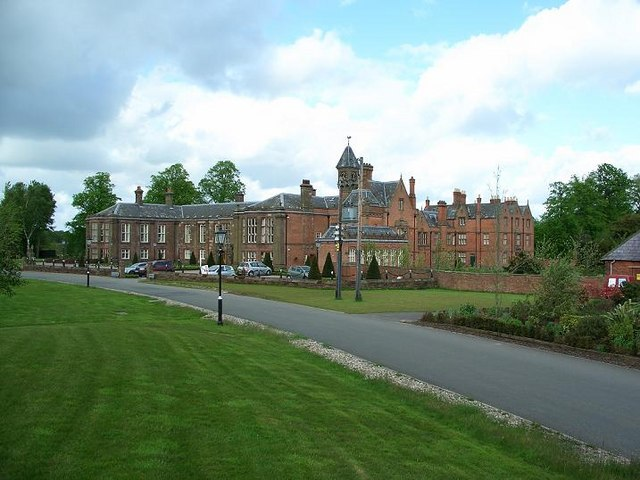
Vale Royal Abbey as it is today. The Tudor and later mansion is built around the core of the mediaeval south and west ranges of the former cloister and contains surviving rooms including the abbot's great hall.

The early history of Cuddington and Sandiway is also closely associated with Vale Royal Abbey, at nearby Whitegate, once the largest Cistercian abbey church in Britain. Sandiway's most famous building is the "Round Tower Lodge" which was built in the early 19th century as the gatehouse to Vale Royal Abbey. The 18-foot high tower is said to have a concealed dungeon which was used as a hiding place by King Charles II. At that time it stood on a quiet country lane but the road became increasingly important and the tower is now a unique landmark in the central reservation of the A556. Now a listed building with a castellated top and bricked up gothic windows, it was a residence until the 1920s and had a single story extension to its east wall which has since been removed.

== Blue Cap ==
Very near the round tower is the Blue Cap Inn which is named after a fox hound. The Cheshire Hounds' kennels were built in Sandiway in 1798, to be replaced in 1834, on the same site, by a new establishment, the Cheshire Forest Kennels. Bluecap was a foxhound owned by John Smith-Barry and in 1762 took part in a famous race, at Newmarket, for a 500-guinea wager with Hugo Meynell, the Master of the Quorn Hunt. Bluecap prevailed and became a local hero and a monument to him stands at the Cheshire Kennels.

== Cuddington railway station and the Whitegate Way ==
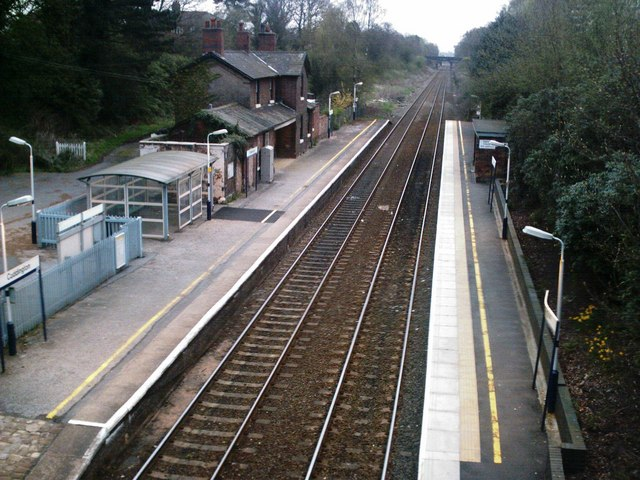
Cuddington railway station

The railway transformed the village, linking it with Manchester and Chester as well as Winsford with the Whitegate way (now closed and used by walkers, cyclists and as a bridleway). The new railway opened to passengers in 1870 shops and businesses grew up around the station. Wealthy commuters from Manchester, Chester and Northwich moved to the village increasing the population and changing its location for the merging in 1935.

== Grand houses and John Douglas ==
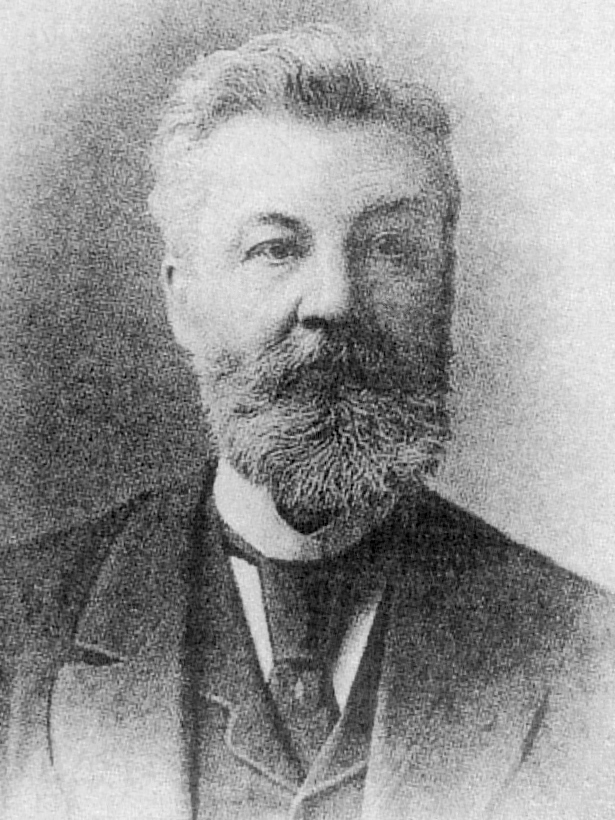
John Douglas, photograph published in 1890

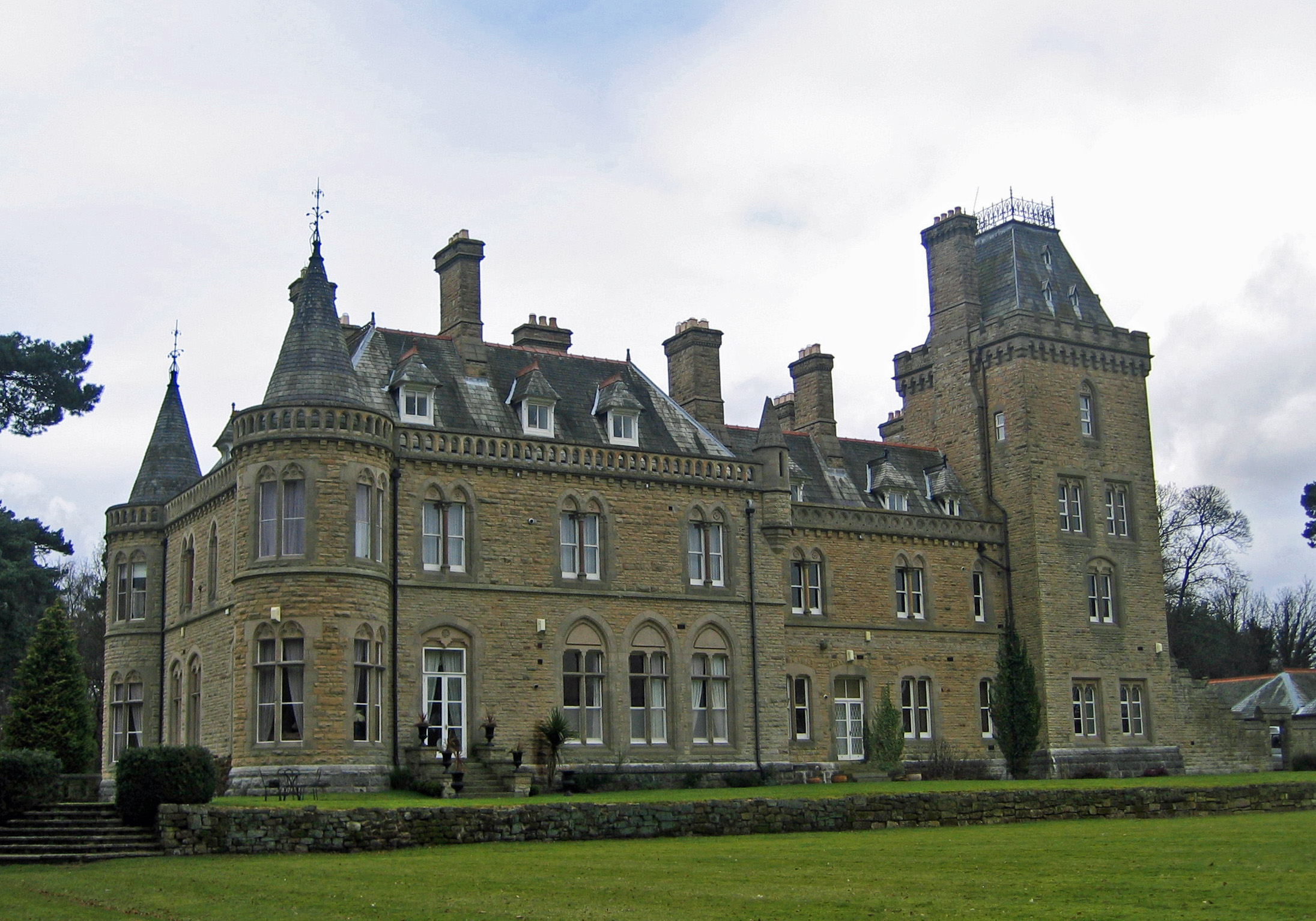
Oakmere Hall

Many of the village's fine houses were designed by John Douglas who was born in Sandiway, at Park Cottage. He is regarded as one of the outstanding architects of his generation. St John's Church, Sandiway, is built on the site which he donated to the village. Other houses in the village include Oakmere Hall (1867).

== Present day ==
Cuddington is a mainly residential village.

=== Petty Pool ===
Many of the homes have now become residential homes for the elderly. Petty Pool has become an outdoor activity centre and college run by the Petty Pool Trust.

== Notable people ==
- John Douglas (1830–1911) lived here, he was the architect responsible for over 500 or so buildings in Cheshire, North Wales and the North West including many of Chester's black-and-white half-timbered buildings and the world-famous Eastgate Clock. He also built the church in Sandiway on land he gave to the village.
- Chris Kelly (born 1940) in Cuddington is a TV presenter, producer and a writer.
- Bob Carolgees (born 1948) of Tiswas and Spit the Dog used to live on Kennel Lane in Sandiway.
- Shirley Strong (born 1958) in Cuddington and lived in the village throughout her career; she was an Olympic silver medallist at the 1984 Summer Olympics in the 100.m hurdles.
- Gary Barlow (born 1971) of Take That once resided on the outskirts of Cuddington at Delamere Manor which was originally the home of the Wilbraham family. The Wilbraham family lived in the area in Delamere House from 1784 to 1939. Where this house once stood is now known as Delamere Park which is a prominent housing estate.
- Phil Foden (born 2000) Manchester City F.C. midfielder, moved to Cuddington in September 2024, he has played 188 games for Man. City and 45 for England

== See also ==
- Listed buildings in Cuddington, Cheshire
