= Sandiway =

Village in Cheshire, England

Coordinates: 53°14′N 2°36′W

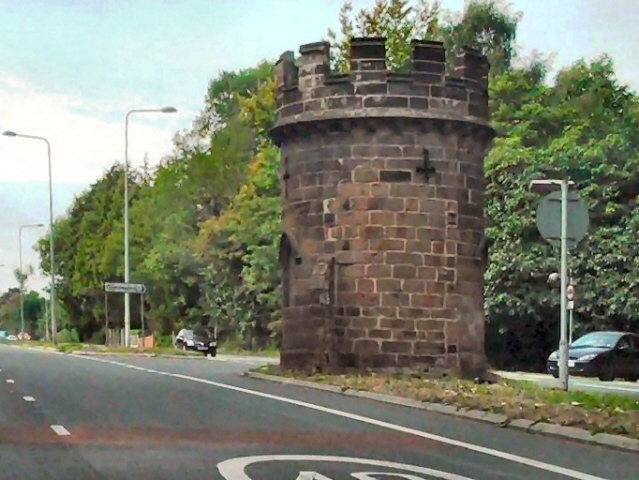
- The Round Tower Lodge

- Location within Cheshire
- Civil parish: Cuddington
- Unitary authority: Cheshire West and Chester
- Ceremonial county: Cheshire
- Region: North West
- Country: England
- Sovereign state: United Kingdom
- Post town: Northwich
- Postcode district: CW8; CW9
- Police: Cheshire
- Fire: Cheshire
- Ambulance: North West

Sandiway is a village in the civil parish of Cuddington, Cheshire, England. It lies to the southeast of and is contiguous with the village of Cuddington.

Sandiway was the birthplace of John Douglas who designed buildings in the centre of Chester, buildings for the Dukes of Westminster and a number of churches in Cheshire. St John's Church, Sandiway, and its lychgate were designed by Douglas and both are Grade II listed buildings.

The Blue Cap is the local pub (on the A556) which was built in 1716 and is now named after a famous local foxhound which won a race against a racehorse at Newmarket in 1763 to settle a wager between the Hon John Smith-Barry, then first Master of the Cheshire foxhounds, and owner of Blue Cap, and Hugo Meynell, the father of modern fox hunting.

Sandiway Golf Club has been used in final qualifying for The Open golf championship and is a venue for regional amateur finals.

The village has one local school, Sandiway Primary School located on Weaverham Road with an adjacent village car park.

Sandiway is the home of Blakemere Village, which has shops set in and around an Edwardian stable block with cobbled courtyard. The centre has an indoor and outdoor children's play area as well as a restaurant, falconry and craft workshop.

Sandiway has cross-roads where the A49 crosses the A556 at the Shell service station, also known as The Toll Bar, presumably from an ancient charge for using the road.

== See also ==
- Listed buildings in Cuddington, Cheshire
- Oakmere Hall
