= 39 Welsh Row, Nantwich =

Historic building in Cheshire, England

Coordinates: 53.0677°N 2.5265°W

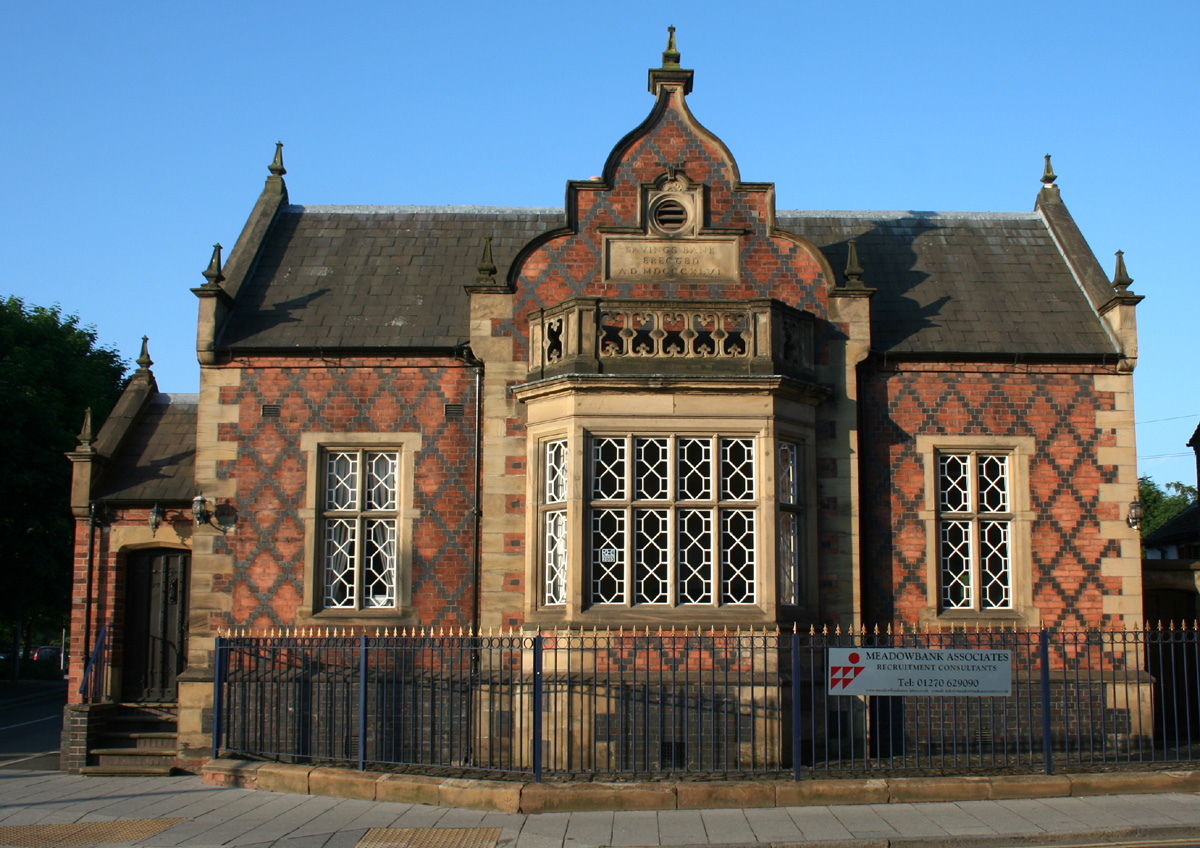
Former Savings Bank, 39 Welsh Row, Nantwich

39 Welsh Row is a Victorian former savings bank, in Jacobean Revival style, in Nantwich, Cheshire, England. It stands on the south side of Welsh Row at the junction with St Anne's Lane (at SJ6482352398). Dating from 1846, it is listed at grade II. Nikolaus Pevsner describes number 39 as "the first noteworthy building" on Welsh Row, which he considers "the best street of Nantwich". The street has many listed buildings and is known for its mixture of architectural styles, including timber-framed black-and-white cottages such as the Wilbraham's and Widows' Almshouses, Georgian town houses such as Townwell House and number 83, and Victorian buildings such as the former Grammar School, Primitive Methodist Chapel and Tollemache Almshouses.

39 Welsh Row is one of three banks in the town dating from the Victorian era which are listed buildings; the others are the former District Bank, designed by Alfred Waterhouse, and Barclays Bank, designed by Thomas Bower, both of which are on Churchyard Side. Number 39 is currently used as offices.

== History ==
The Savings Bank was built in 1846, and cost an estimated £970. Two earlier independent banks had been established in the town, but had proved short-lived, failing in 1816 and 1826. By 20 November 1848, the Savings Bank had 1079 deposits, of which 1064 were private, nine were from charitable societies and six from friendly societies. Savings banks were intended to assist the poor to save money for periods of hardship, and most deposits at that date were relatively modest, with nearly half no more than £20 (around £1,500 today), and only seven above £200 (£15,600 today). In 1850, it opened only twice monthly, on the first and third Monday of the month. It was then one of two banks in the town, the other being a branch of the Manchester and Liverpool District Bank on the High Street. By 1874, the bank was open weekly, on Mondays between 11 and 1.

The Savings Bank was still at Welsh Row in 1914; however, by 1930 it had amalgamated with the Chester & Wrexham District Savings Bank and moved to 29 High Street. In the early 20th century the building was in a dilapidated condition. By 1971, 39 Welsh Row was used as offices for Pearl Assurance.

== Description ==
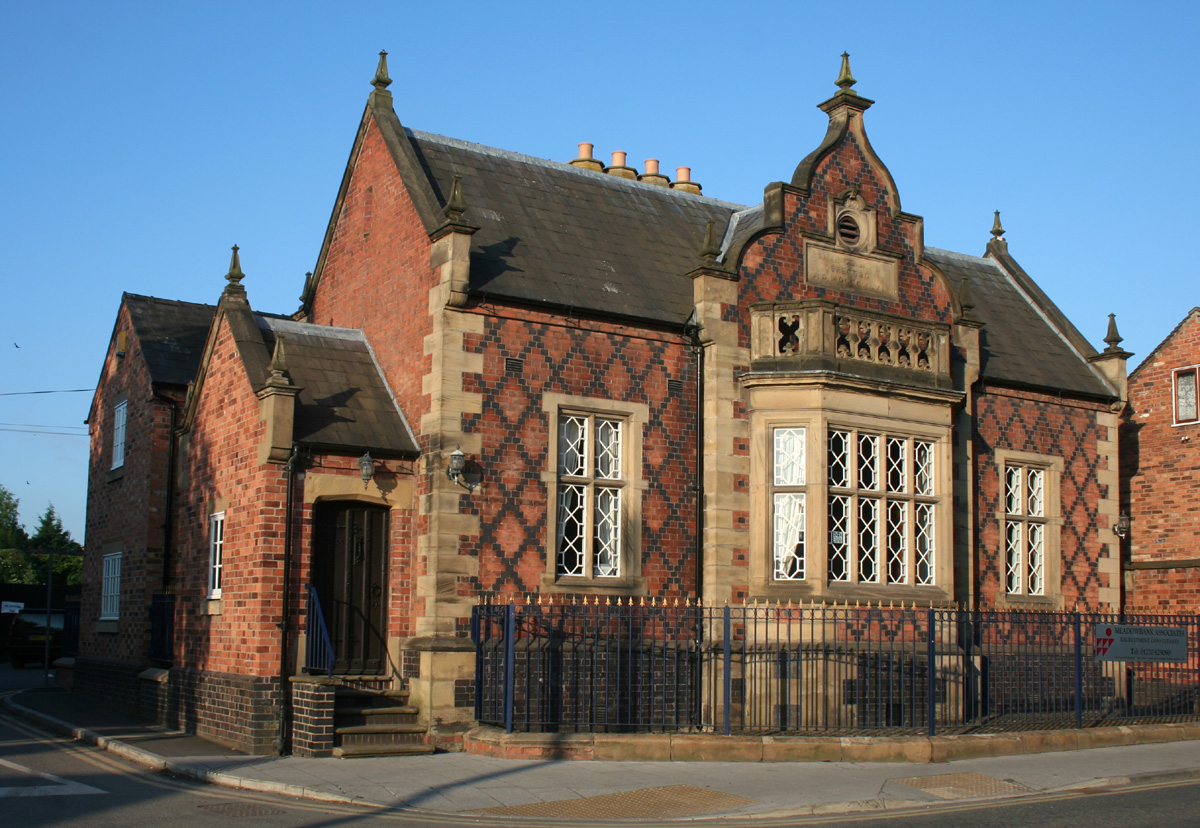
Another view, showing porch

The former bank is a detached single-storey building in Jacobean Revival style, set back from the street behind railings. In red brick under a slate roof, it has decorative blue-brick diapering and stone dressings on the Welsh Row (front) face. The central bay of the front face projects slightly and has a prominent shaped gable, finished with a stone coping and three triangular finials; the gable contains a circular stone moulding, formerly a clock face, and a stone plaque inscribed "Savings Bank erected A.D. MDCCCXLVI". The central bay has a canted bay window surmounted by a stone balustrade with foliage decoration and cross-shaped openings. The flanking bays each have a single window, and all three windows to the front face have stone mullions and transoms and hexagonal-latticed lights.

The main entrance is in a gabled porch attached to the St Anne's Lane (left) face; the doorway, reached by a short flight of stone steps, is undecorated and has a stone top. The sides of the Welsh Row face and the edges of the central bay have decorative stone quoins. The gable ends and the porch gable have stone corbels and coping, and are finished with triangular finials matching those on the central shaped gable.

== Modern use ==
As of 2010, the building is used as the offices of a recruitment agency.

== See also ==
- Listed buildings in Nantwich
