= Listed buildings in Kelsall =

Kelsall is a civil parish in Cheshire West and Chester, England. It contains six buildings that are recorded in the National Heritage List for England as designated listed buildings, all of which are at Grade II. This grade is the lowest of the three gradings given to listed buildings and is applied to "buildings of national importance and special interest". Much of the parish is occupied by the village of Kelsall, with the rest of the parish rural. The listed buildings consist of farmhouses, farm buildings, a church and a lock-up.

Name and location	Photograph	Date	Notes
Rookery Farmhouse; 53.2070°N 2.7197°W	—	Early 17th century	A timber-framed farmhouse with plaster and brick nogging and a plastic tiled roof. It consists of a main block and a cross-wing. The farmhouse is in two storeys, and has a four-bay front. The windows are casements.
Kelsall Hall; 53.2129°N 2.7088°W		Early 18th century	A brick farmhouse with a stone plinth and a Welsh slate roof. It is in two storeys, has an L-shaped plan, and a south front of four bays. The windows are sashes. Around the door is a doorcase with plain columns and a triangular pediment.
Lock-up; 53.20693°N 2.72062°W		Early 19th century	A semi-circular sandstone lock-up about 1.6 metres (5.2 ft) high, with three massive stones forming the roof. The flat side faces the road, and contains a low entrance.
Farm buildings, Hallowsgate Farm; 53.2044°N 2.7141°W	—	Early 19th century	The farm buildings were partly rebuilt in the 20th century. They are constructed in brick with a Welsh slate roof. The buildings have a long, irregular plan, are in two storeys, and have an eight-bay front. The doors and windows have segmental heads. In the walls are pitch holes, and a re-set datestone inscribed "1739".
Hallowsgate Farmhouse; 53.2045°N 2.7146°W	—	Early to mid-19th century	The farmhouse has earlier origins, and there have been later alterations. It is built in brick on a stone plinth and has a Welsh slate roof. The farmhouse is in two storeys, has an L-shaped plan, and a four-bay south front. The front range has sash windows, and the rear range has casements.
St Philip's Church; 53.2081°N 2.7115°W		1860	The church was designed by Thomas Bower of Nantwich, and constructed in sandstone. It has a Welsh slate roof with a tile ridge. The church is in Decorated style, and consists of a nave, a chancel, a south porch and a vestry. On the chancel arch is a bellcote.

== See also ==
- Listed buildings in Ashton Hayes
- Listed buildings in Delamere
- Listed buildings in Horton-cum-Peel
- Listed buildings in Oakmere
- Listed buildings in Tarvin
- Listed buildings in Willington
