= 11 Churchyard Side, Nantwich =

Victorian bank building in Cheshire, England

Coordinates: 53.0674°N 2.5214°W

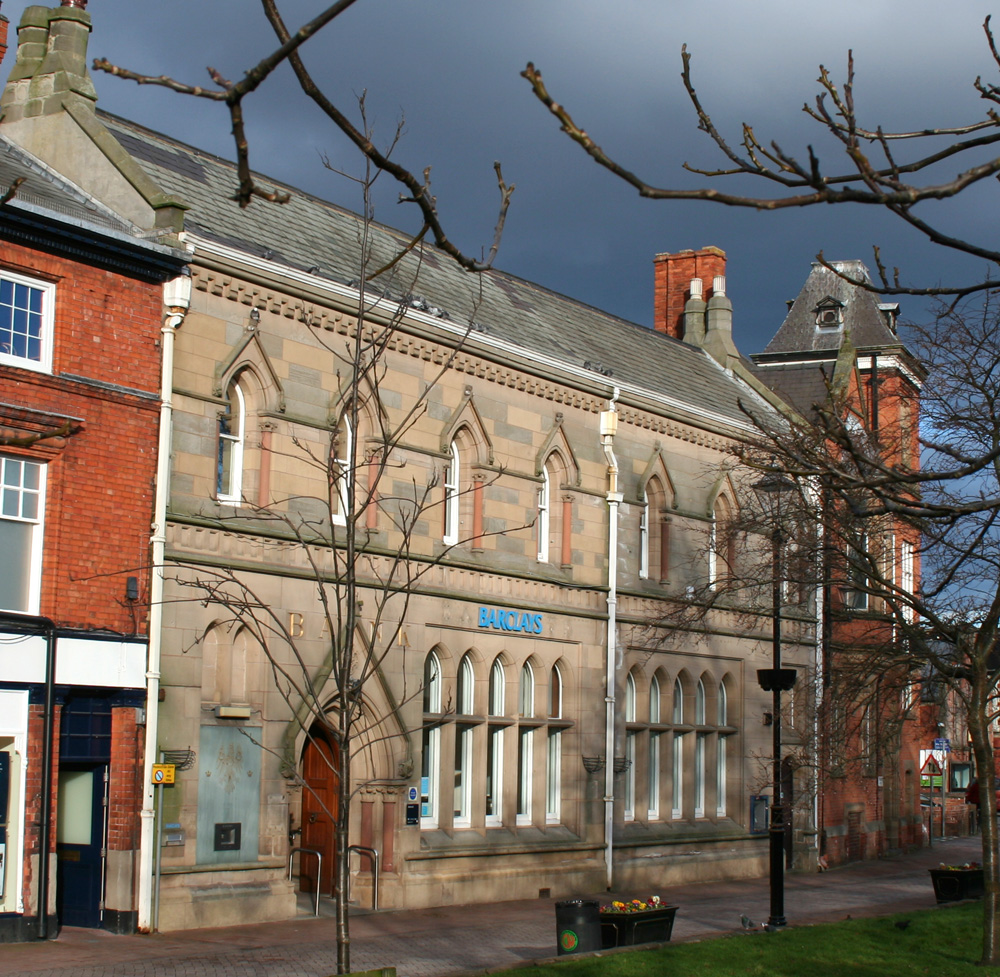
Barclays Bank, 11 Churchyard Side, Nantwich

11 Churchyard Side is a Victorian building in Gothic Revival style, in Nantwich, Cheshire, England. It stands on the town square, opposite the parish church (at SJ6516052369). Dating from 1876, the building was designed by local architect Thomas Bower as a branch of the Midland Bank, and later became a branch of Barclays. It is listed at grade II.

11 Churchyard Side is one of three bank buildings in the town dating from the Victorian era which are listed; the others are the former District Bank, designed by Alfred Waterhouse, also on Churchyard Side, and the former Savings Bank on Welsh Row.

== History ==
The present building was constructed in 1876 as a branch of the Midland Bank, to the design of Nantwich architect Thomas Bower. It was on the site of an earlier Midland Bank building, which employed a manager and seven clerks in 1871. Once part of the cemetery of the parish church, the site had previously housed a painter and a butcher's premises. The bank was later extended and altered in the same style. The Midland Bank is no longer listed in directories from 1892; Barclays Bank has occupied the building since 1939.

== Description ==
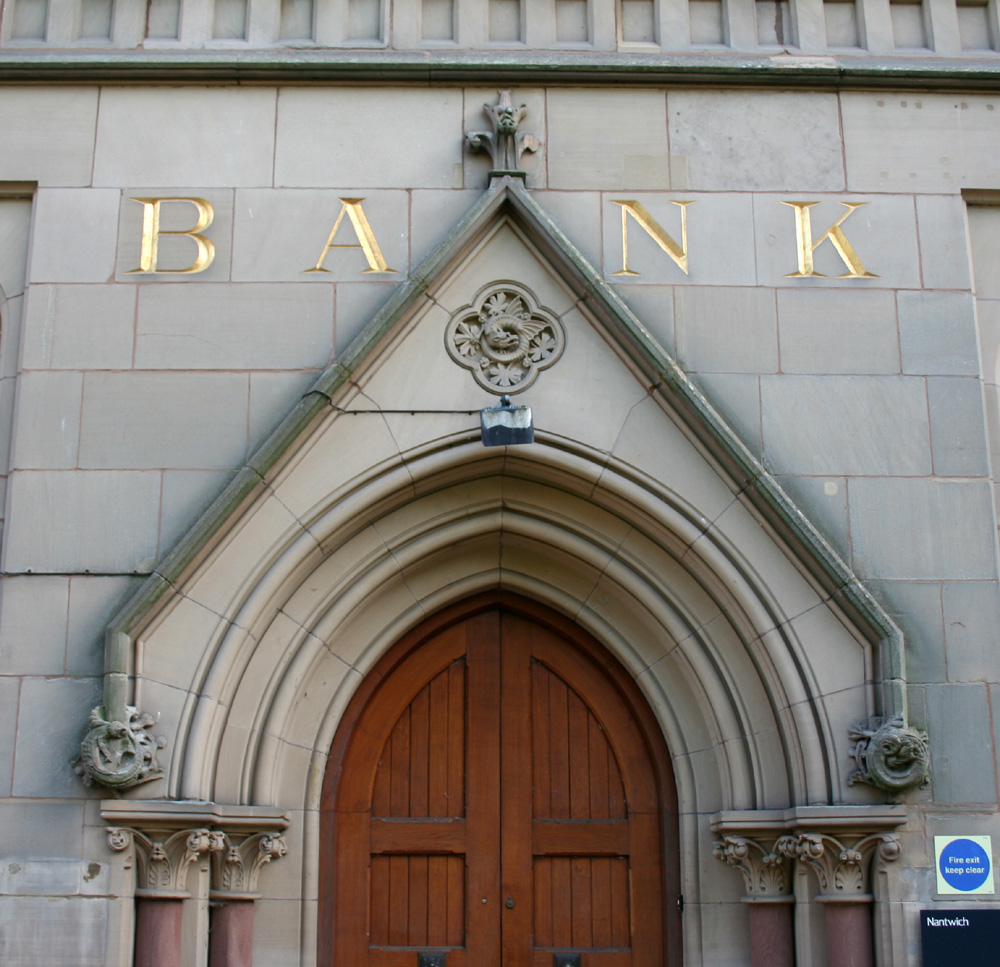
Entrance detail

The bank is a terraced ashlar building in Gothic Revival style, with two storeys and seven bays. Nikolaus Pevsner describes it as "later, smoother, equally Gothic" by comparison with the nearby District Bank, which was designed by Alfred Waterhouse. Its roof of Westmorland green slate is described by local historian Jane Stevenson as "beautiful". A band between ground and first floor is decorated with rectangular coffering, which matches the dentilled cornice under the eaves. There are also two plain stone bands, one on the ground floor beneath the windows and the other on the first floor at the level of the window heads.

The main entrance is at the left (west) side. It is flanked by two sets of paired orange columns and headed by a pointed arch. Above is a V-shaped stone moulding with two carved bosses and an intricately carved quatrefoil containing a dragon and foliage. The word "bank" is incised above the entrance. There are two stone mullioned and transomed windows on the ground floor, which each consist of five two-light units with pointed arched heads. A two-unit "window" to the left of the main entrance is blocked. The first floor has seven windows, each of which is flanked by paired orange columns and headed with a pointed arch, with a V-shaped stone moulding above similar to that above the main entrance.

== See also ==
- Listed buildings in Nantwich

== Notes and references ==
=== Sources ===
- Hall J. A History of the Town and Parish of Nantwich, or Wich Malbank, in the County Palatine of Chester (2nd edn) (E. J. Morten; 1972) (ISBN 0-901598-24-0)
- Lamberton A, Gray R. Lost Houses in Nantwich (Landmark Publishing; 2005) (ISBN 1-84306-202-X)
- Pevsner N, Hubbard E. The Buildings of England: Cheshire (Penguin Books; 1971) (ISBN 0-14-071042-6)
- Stevenson PJ. Nantwich: A Brief History and Guide (1994)
