= 9 Mill Street, Nantwich =

Building in Nantwich, Cheshire, England

Coordinates: 53.06611°N 2.52305°W

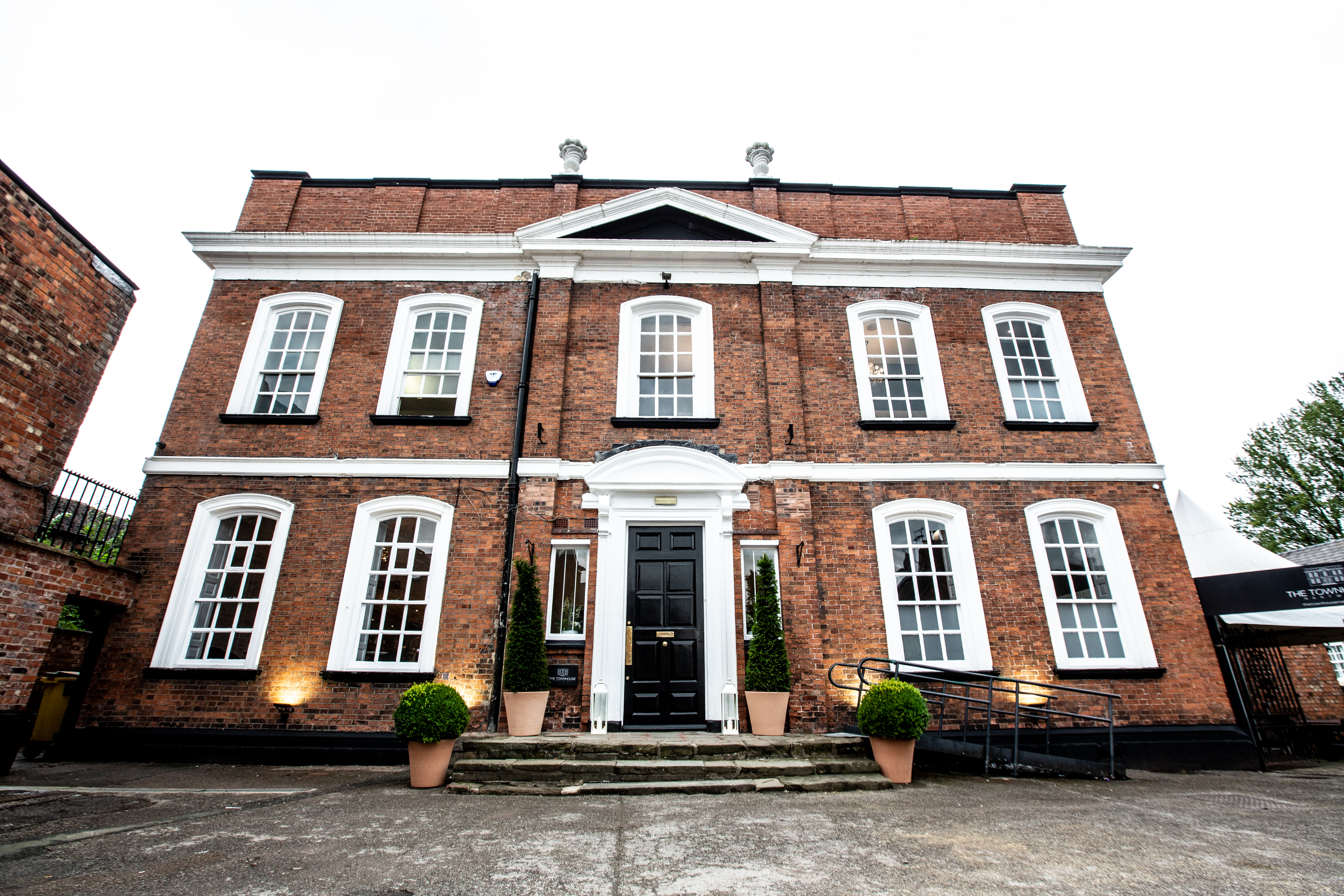
9 Mill Street, Nantwich

9 Mill Street is a Georgian house in Nantwich, Cheshire, England. The present building (at SJ65045221) dates from around 1736 and is a grade II* listed building. Nikolaus Pevsner calls it a "fine, spacious" house, and the English Heritage listing describes it as a "substantial and well-detailed early, C18 Town House, which ... retains much original interior fabric." Formerly a town house, bank and political club, it is currently a restaurant and bar.

It stands on the site of an earlier house, which has been identified as the residence of the Wright family, one of the five principal houses of Nantwich in the 17th century.

== History ==
The present building stands on the site of an earlier house, which was identified by historian James Hall as the "very fine brick house of Mr. Wrights", one of the five principal houses of the town described by William Webb in 1622–23. The use of brick other than for chimneys was very unusual in Nantwich at this date. Other brick buildings include Townsend House, the demolished Wilbraham mansion on Welsh Row completed in around 1580, and the Wright's Almshouses of 1638. Local historian Jeremy Lake considers that the use of brick was an expression of wealth of the owner. The Wrights were one of the major Nantwich families between the mid-16th century and the early 18th century; Sir Edmund Wright (b. 1573) rose to become Lord Mayor of London in 1640–41. Other residents of this earlier house include, in 1691, Samuel Acton, a wealthy tobacconist who became important in the town's salt trade and was also the town's first-recorded Baptist minister.

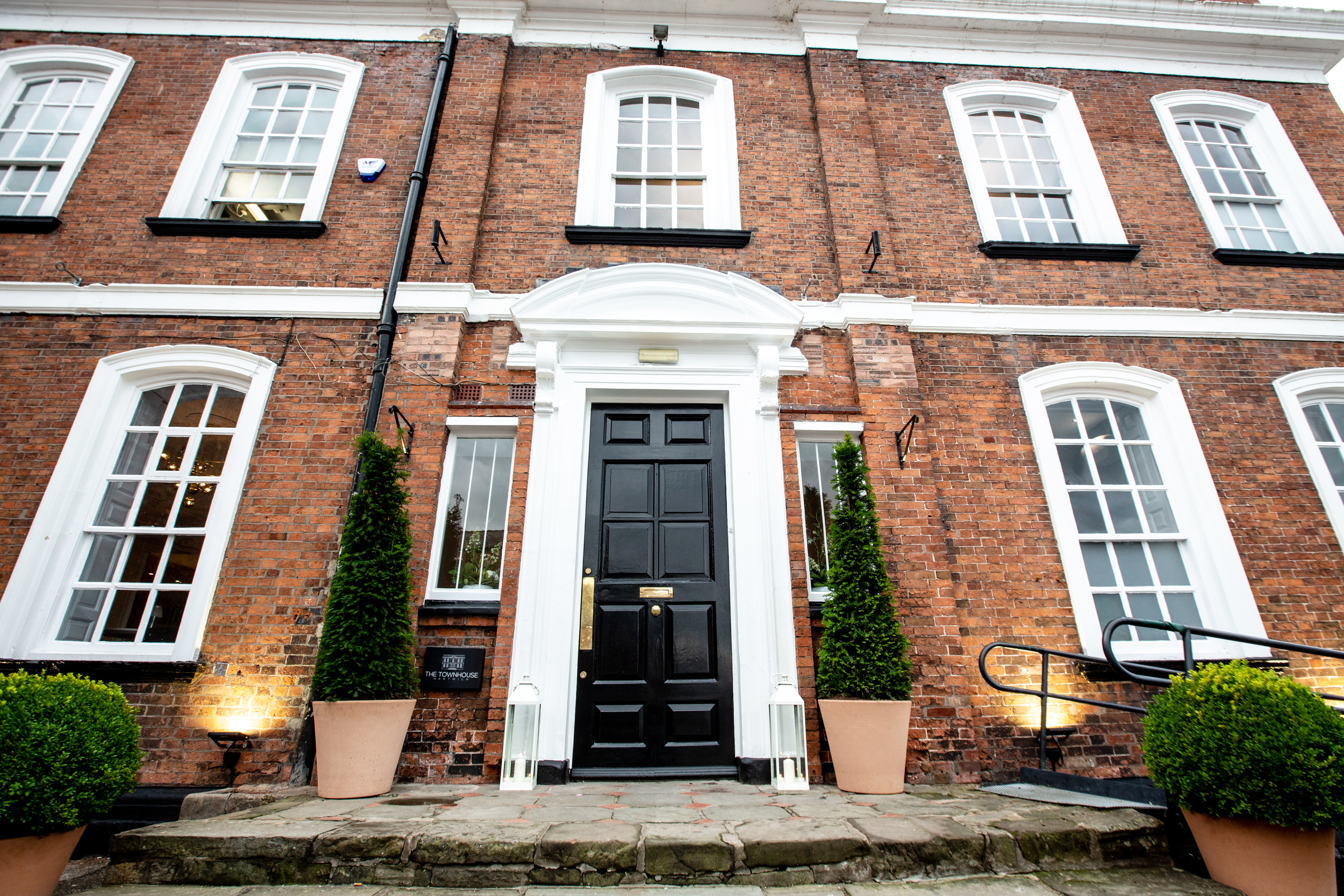
Detail of entrance and windows

The present house was built in around 1736 as a town house. According to Hall, it was renovated or rebuilt in the late 18th century. In the early 19th century, it was occupied by a wine merchant. It became the Nantwich branch of the Manchester and Liverpool District Bank in 1852, and underwent alteration at this date; it also served as the bank manager's residence. In 1866, the District Bank moved to a new building on Churchyard Side by Alfred Waterhouse, and 9 Mill Street returned to private ownership after a period of standing empty. In 1883, it was known as "The Elms" and was occupied by a shoe manufacturer. Hall describes "lofty and spacious wainscotted rooms" and a "fine staircase" at this date.

Nantwich Liberal Club (founded in 1875) acquired the building in 1897, and the building was extended at this date; it served as a political club for much of the 20th century. Since the closure of the club in the 1990s, the building has been occupied by the Riverside Club, Peppers restaurant, the Residence restaurant, The Townhouse Restaurant & Bar, Sugar Lounge and most recently 9 Mill Street.

== Description ==
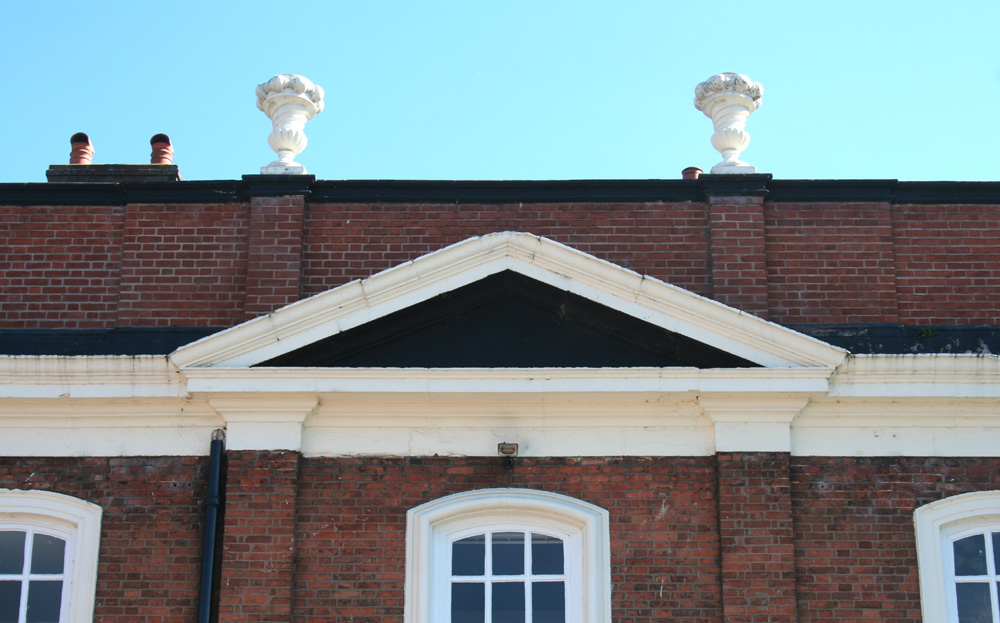
Pediment and parapet

In red brick with stone dressings, the house has two storeys with attics and basements, under a tiled roof. The five-bay front (north) face has a central entrance bay, set slightly forwards, which is flanked by brick pilasters and capped with a pediment. At the level of the pediment is a cornice topped with a parapet, which is decorated with a pair of urns. The roof has a south-facing platform accessed via the attics. The main windows to both storeys feature arched heads. The entrance door is flanked by small paired windows and has an arched top, supported by two scrolls. The entrance and flanking windows were formerly surrounded by a stone porch supported by four columns; this was removed some time after 1966.

Although the interior plan has been substantially altered from the original town house, many Georgian features have survived on both ground and first floors, including cornices, panelling, architraves around the doors, and the main staircase as well as the attic stairs.

== Modern use ==
The building is currently occupied by The Townhouse, a bar/restaurant and licensed wedding venue, which opened in August 2020. The ground floor features a large restaurant, bar area and 'Garden Room', serving a British and Mediterranean mix of cuisine, along with Classic and on trend cocktails.

== See also ==
- Listed buildings in Nantwich
