= 1–3 Churchyard Side, Nantwich =

1–3 Churchyard Side
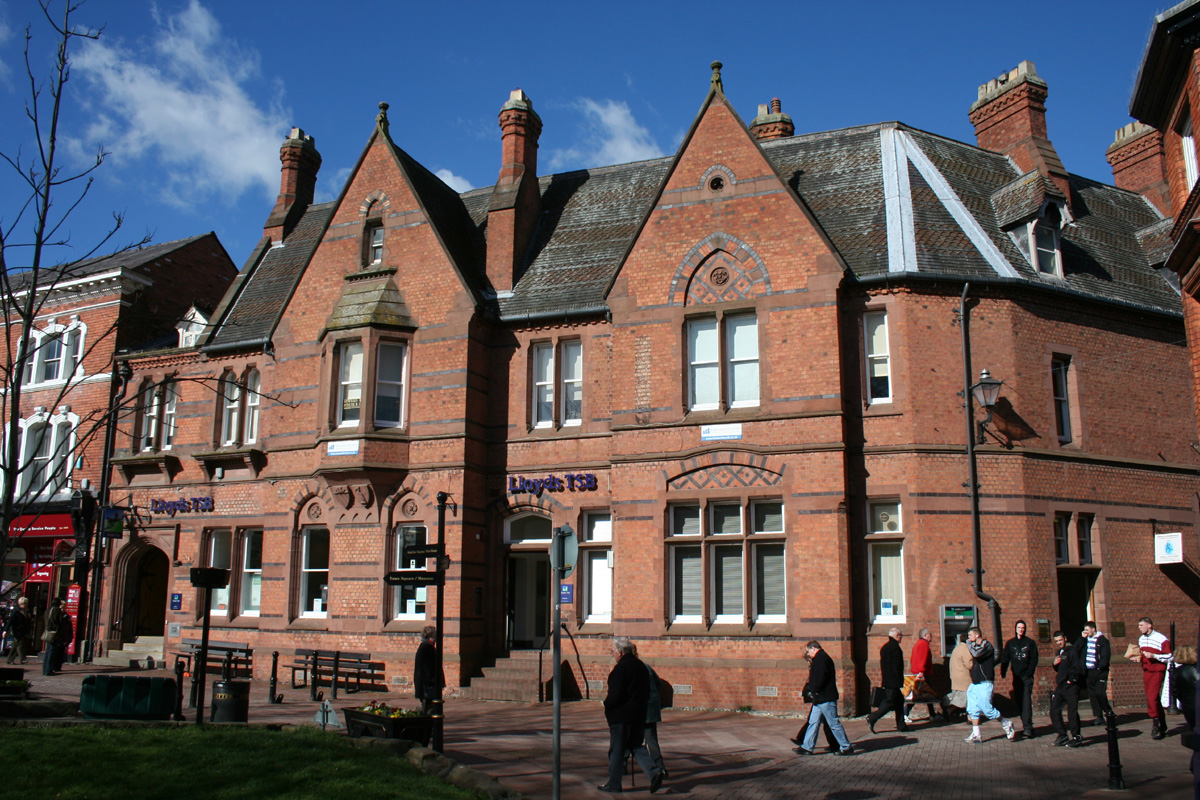

- Location in Cheshire
- 53.0674°N 2.5220°W
- Location: Nantwich, Cheshire, England

History
- Built: 1864–66
- Built for: Manchester and Liverpool District Bank

Site notes
- Architect: Alfred Waterhouse
- Architectural style: Gothic Revival
- Current use: Lloyds TSB

Listed Building – Grade II
- Official name: Nos 1 and 3 (District Bank)
- Designated: 1 March 1974
- Reference no.: 1138728

1–3 Churchyard Side is a grade-II-listed Victorian Gothic building in Nantwich, Cheshire, England, located on the corner of Churchyard Side and Pepper Street (SJ6511952369), opposite St Mary's Church. Built in 1864–66 to a design by Alfred Waterhouse as the Nantwich branch of the Manchester and Liverpool District Bank, it is among the most notable examples of Victorian corporate architecture in the town. The building remained a branch of the District Bank until the late 20th century, and is still in use as a bank.

== History ==
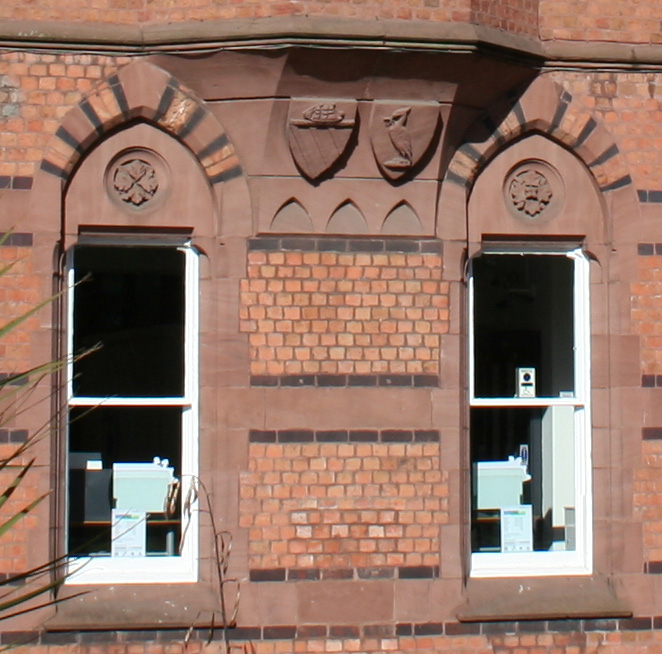
Detail of left gable, with coats of arms

1–3 Churchyard Side was built in 1864–66 to a design by Alfred Waterhouse as the Nantwich branch of the Manchester and Liverpool District Bank. Although Waterhouse is best known for the Natural History Museum in London, he practised in Manchester until 1865 and many of his earlier buildings are in that city, including the assize courts (1859–64), Strangeways Prison (1862–69), Owens College (1873) and the town hall (1877). Richard Beckett and Thomas Bowker were contractors.

The bank opened on 2 June 1866, replacing the branch at 9 Mill Street, which had opened in 1852. An earlier branch of the bank had been established in Barker Street in 1830. In 1874, there were four banks in the town, the others being the Midland, also on Churchyard Side; the Savings Bank on Welsh Row; and Downes, Groome, and Hamilton on the High Street. By 1939, the bank had become known simply as the District Bank, and 1–3 Churchyard Side remained a branch of the District Bank until at least the 1970s.

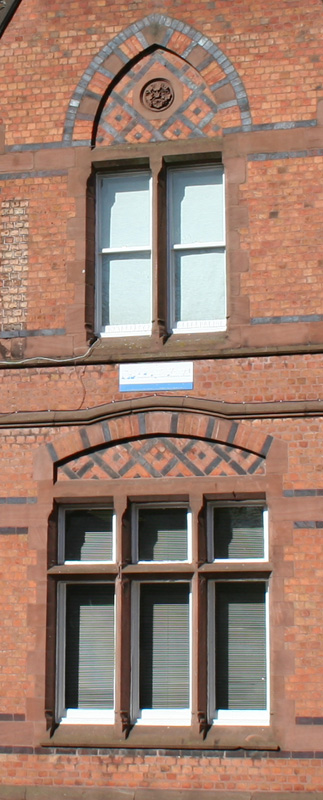
Right gable detail

== Description ==
1–3 Churchyard Side is two-storey Victorian Gothic building in red brick with blue brick decoration and sandstone dressings, under a tiled roof. The central main entrance is flanked by two gables and is reached by a flight of brick steps. The left gable has an oriel window to the first floor, with the coats of arms of both Manchester and Liverpool beneath. Several of the windows have stone mullions and transoms; some have decorative arches above in brick or brick and sandstone.

== Modern use ==
As of 2010, the building is a branch of the Lloyds TSB bank; the first floor is used for offices.

== See also ==
- Listed buildings in Nantwich
