= Kelsall =

Village in Cheshire, England

Coordinates: 53.207°N 2.712°W

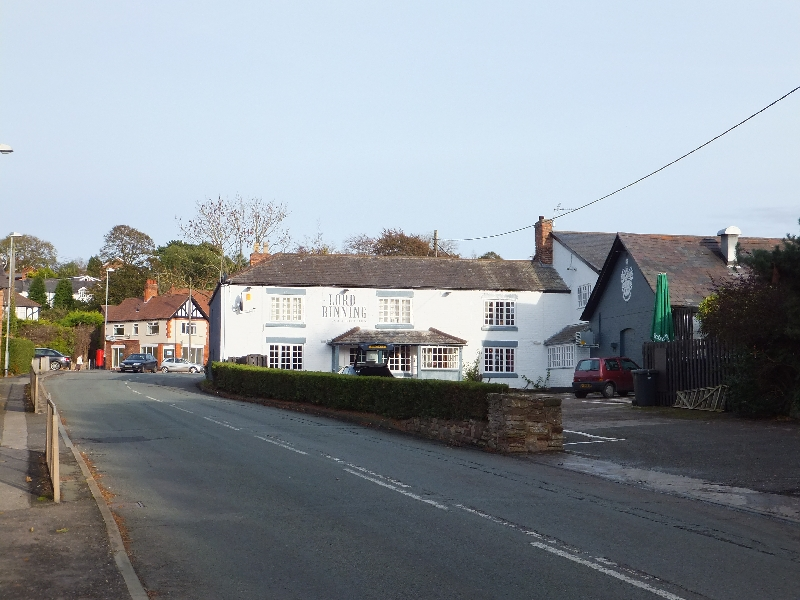
- The Lord Binning (now The Morris Dancer), a pub in the village centre

- Location within Cheshire
- Population: 2,609 (2011)
- OS grid reference: SJ525680
- Civil parish: Kelsall
- Unitary authority: Cheshire West and Chester
- Ceremonial county: Cheshire
- Region: North West
- Country: England
- Sovereign state: United Kingdom
- Post town: TARPORLEY
- Postcode district: CW6
- Dialling code: 01829
- Police: Cheshire
- Fire: Cheshire
- Ambulance: North West
- UK Parliament: Chester South and Eddisbury

Kelsall is a village and civil parish in the unitary authority of Cheshire West and Chester and the ceremonial county of Cheshire, England. It is located around 8 miles (13 km) east of Chester, 8 miles (13 km) west of Northwich, and 4 miles (6 km) north west of Tarporley. The village is situated on Kelsall Hill, a part of the Mid-Cheshire Ridge, the broken line of sandstone hills that divide the west Cheshire Plain from its eastern counterpart. The ridge includes other hills including Peckforton, Beeston, Frodsham, and Helsby.

== Geology ==
The western part of the parish (west of the Peckforton Fault) is underlain by the Wilmslow Sandstone Formation. East of the fault, the bedrock is largely Tarporley Siltstone with the underlying Helsby Sandstone occurring in some areas.

The lower ground in the west is largely covered by glacial till whilst higher ground in the east is free of superficial deposits. A small area of glacio-fluvial sands and gravels is mapped in the centre of the parish. A narrow strip of alluvium is associated with Salter's Brook.

The Peckforton Fault runs into the parish from the SE then turns north. It downthrows to the east. Two parallel unnamed faults, both downthrowing to the west, run NNE–SSW through Kelsall village, their southern ends terminating at the Peckforton Fault. They terminate against a short ENE–WSW aligned fault with a northerly downthrow at the northern end of the parish. The Clotton Fault which downthrows to the east runs NNW–SSE through the western part of the parish. The rocks within the faulted blocks have a gentle to moderate easterly dip.

== History ==
On Christmas Eve, December 1944, a V-1 flying bomb exploded near Street Farm to the south of the village. It had been one of several aerial-launched rockets fired at Manchester by the German Luftwaffe. This explosion would be the most westerly impact of a V1 bomb during the Second World War.

== Demographics ==
At the 2001 census, the population of Kelsall civil parish was 2,525, increasing to 2,609 at the 2011 census. The total population of the Kelsall local government ward, which also included the village of Ashton Hayes, was recorded as 3,439. This ward had been amalgamated with Tarvin by the time of the 2011 Census.

== Amenities ==
The village contains two churches, primary school, community centre, doctors' surgery, chemist, local store, butchers shop, four public houses, farm shop), and nursing and residential home. The Kelsall and District Rural Amenities Society (KADRAS) was formed in the late 1960s in order to stimulate public interest in the care and development of Kelsall's history, beauty and character.

The village also hosts the annual Chester Folk Festival every May. The £3.82m, two-mile A54 bypass opened in October 1986.

== See also ==
- Listed buildings in Kelsall
- St Philip's Church, Kelsall
