= Jacobethan =

19th-century Renaissance revival style of English architecture

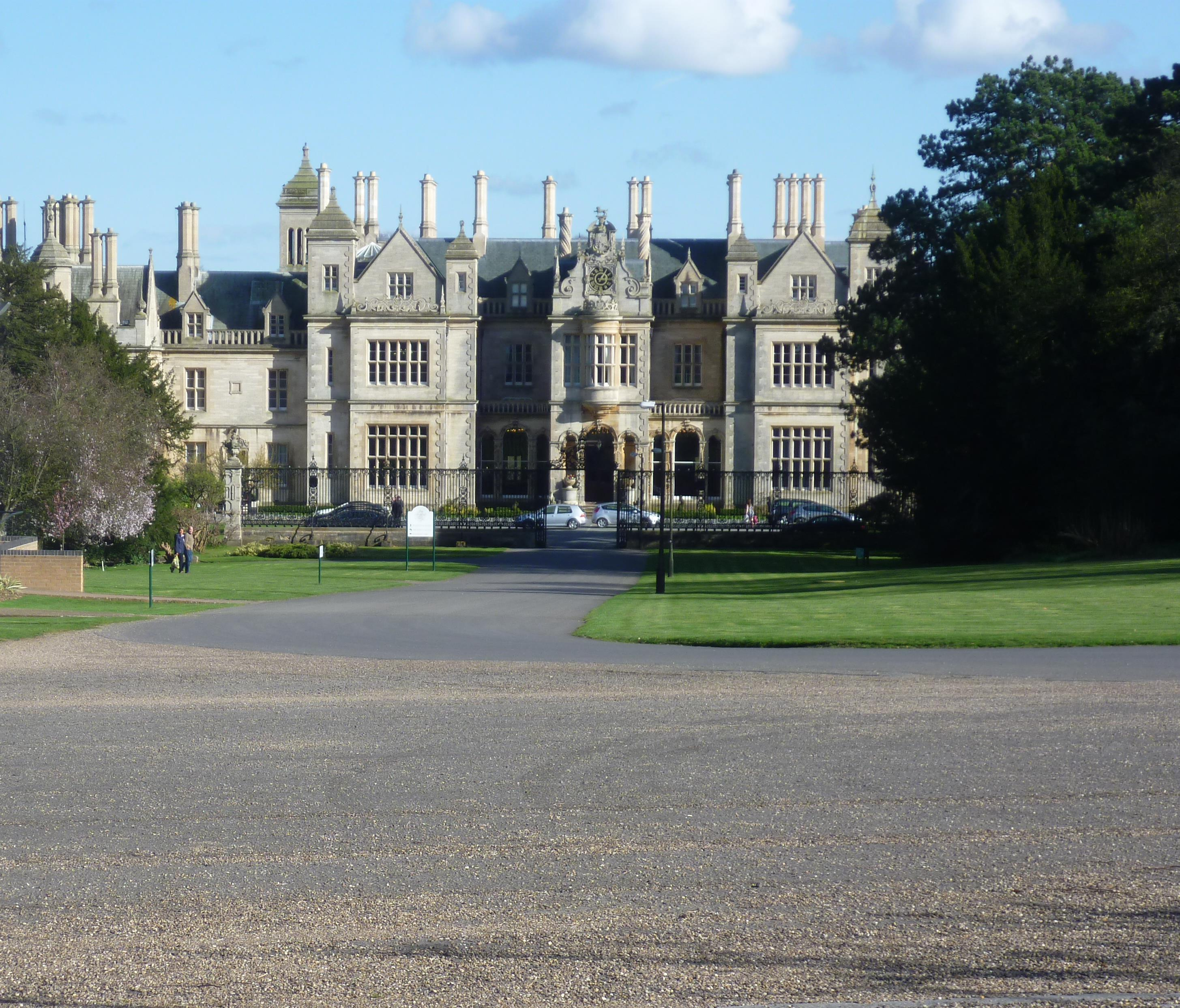
- The Jacobethan style of Stoke Rochford Hall, Lincolnshire
- Years active: 1820s–1920s
- Location: England
- Influences: Elizabethan; Jacobean
- Influenced: Tudorbethan

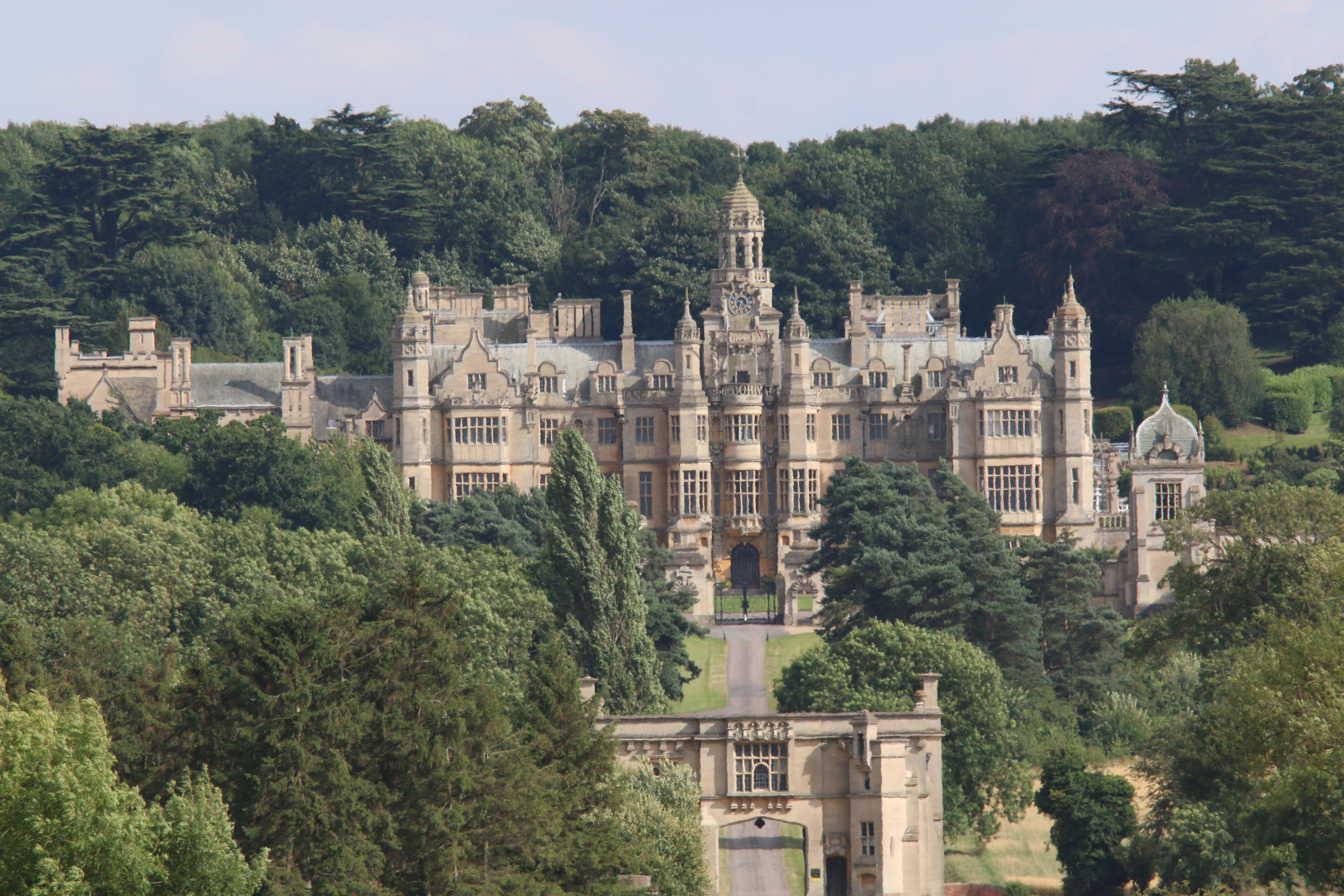
Anthony Salvin's Harlaxton Manor, 1837–1855, is an embodiment of Jacobethan architecture

The Jacobethan (/ˌdʒækəˈbiːθən/ jak-ə-BEE-thən) architectural style, also known as Jacobean Revival, is the mixed national Renaissance revival style that was made popular in England from the late 1820s, which derived most of its inspiration and its repertory from the English Renaissance (1550–1625), with elements of Elizabethan and Jacobean.

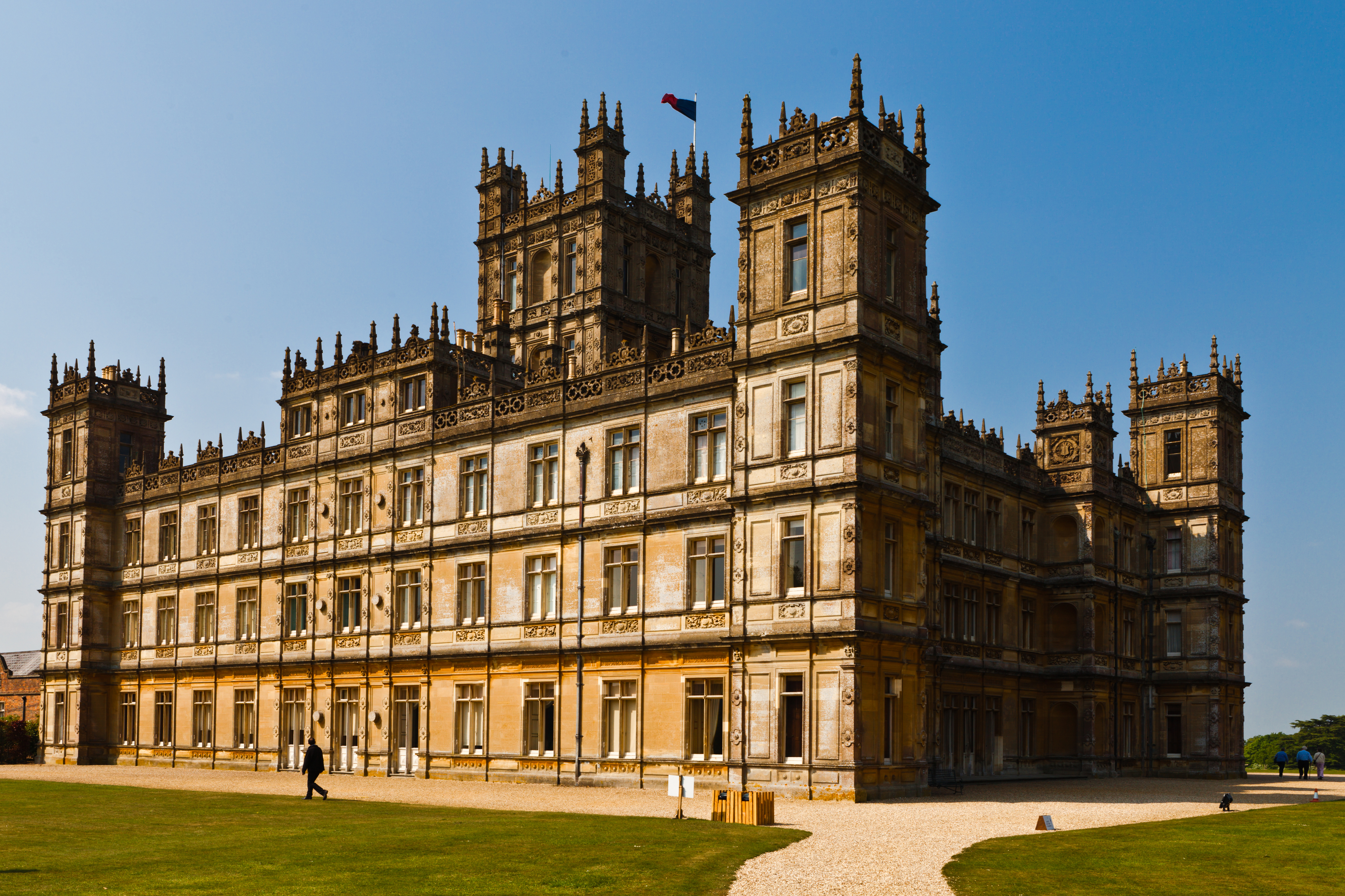
Highclere Castle, known from the Downton Abbey television series, is an example of Jacobethan style

John Betjeman coined the term "Jacobethan" in 1933, and described it as follows:

The style in which the Gothic predominates may be called, inaccurately enough, Elizabethan, and the style in which the classical predominates over the Gothic, equally inaccurately, may be called Jacobean. To save the time of those who do not wish to distinguish between these periods of architectural uncertainty, I will henceforward use the term "Jacobethan".

The term caught on with art historians. Timothy Mowl asserts in The Elizabethan and Jacobean Style (2001) that the Jacobethan style represents the last outpouring of an authentically native genius that was stifled by slavish adherence to European baroque taste.

== Style ==
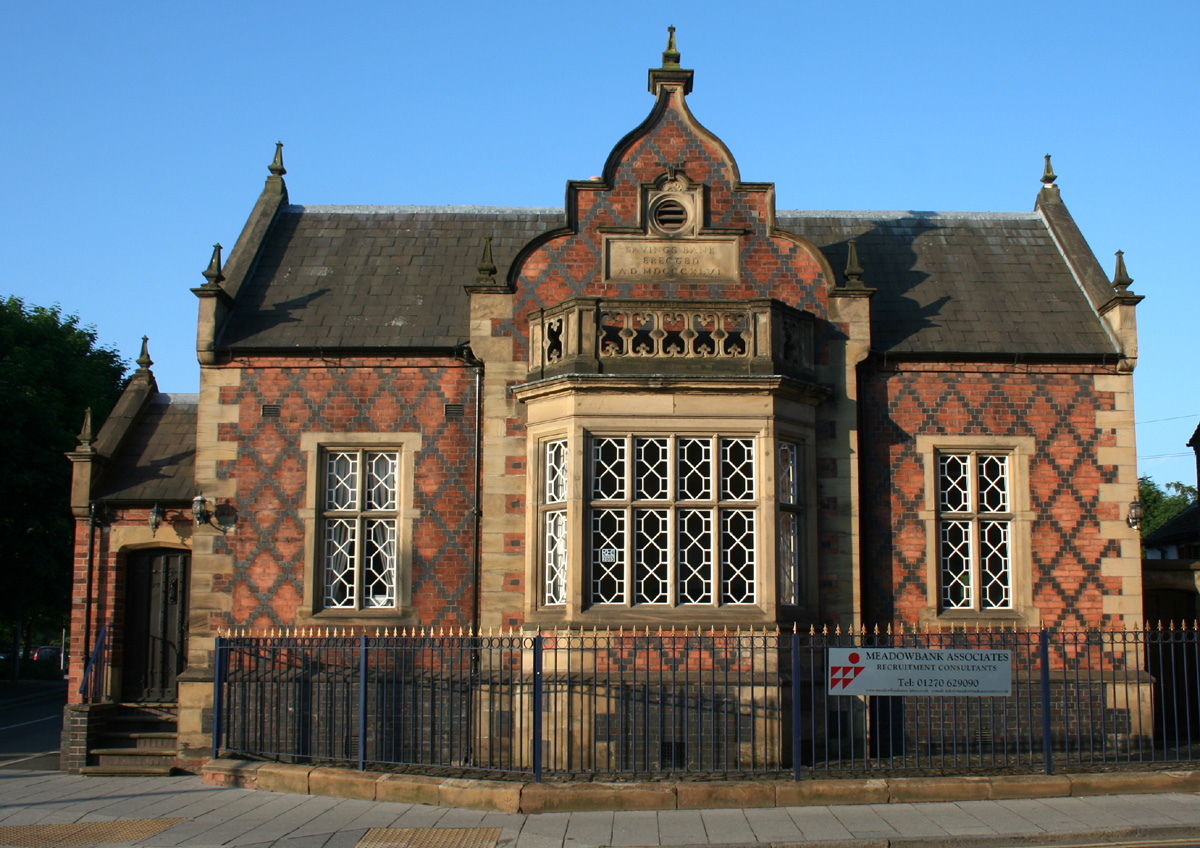
The former bank at 39 Welsh Row, Nantwich is another

In architecture the style's main characteristics are flattened, cusped "Tudor" arches, lighter stone trims around windows and doors, carved brick detailing, steep roof gables, often terra-cotta brickwork, balustrades and parapets, pillars supporting porches and high chimneys as in the Elizabethan style. Examples of this style are Harlaxton Manor in Lincolnshire (illustration), Mentmore Towers in Buckinghamshire and Sandringham House in Norfolk, England.

In June 1835, when the competition was announced for designs for new Houses of Parliament, the terms asked for designs either in the Gothic or the Elizabethan style. The seal was set on the Gothic Revival as a national style, even for the grandest projects on the largest scale; at the same time, the competition introduced the possibility of an Elizabethan revival. Of the ninety-seven designs submitted, six were in a self-described "Elizabethan" style.

In 1838, with the Gothic revival well under way in Britain, Joseph Nash, trained in A. W. N. Pugin's office designing Gothic details, struck out on his own with a lithographed album Architecture of the Middle Ages: Drawn from Nature and on Stone in 1838. Casting about for a follow-up, Nash extended the range of antiquarian interests forward in time with his next series of lithographs The Mansions of England in the Olden Time 1839–1849, which accurately illustrated Tudor and Jacobean great houses, interiors as well as exteriors, made lively with furnishings and peopled by inhabitants in ruffs and farthingales, the quintessence of "Merrie Olde England". A volume of text accompanied the fourth and last volume of plates in 1849, but it was Nash's picturesque illustrations that popularised the style and created a demand for the variations on the English Renaissance styles that was the essence of the newly revived "Jacobethan" vocabulary.

Two young architects already providing Jacobethan buildings were James Pennethorne and Anthony Salvin, both later knighted. Salvin's Jacobethan Harlaxton Manor, near Grantham, Lincolnshire, its first sections completed in 1837, is the great example that defines the style.

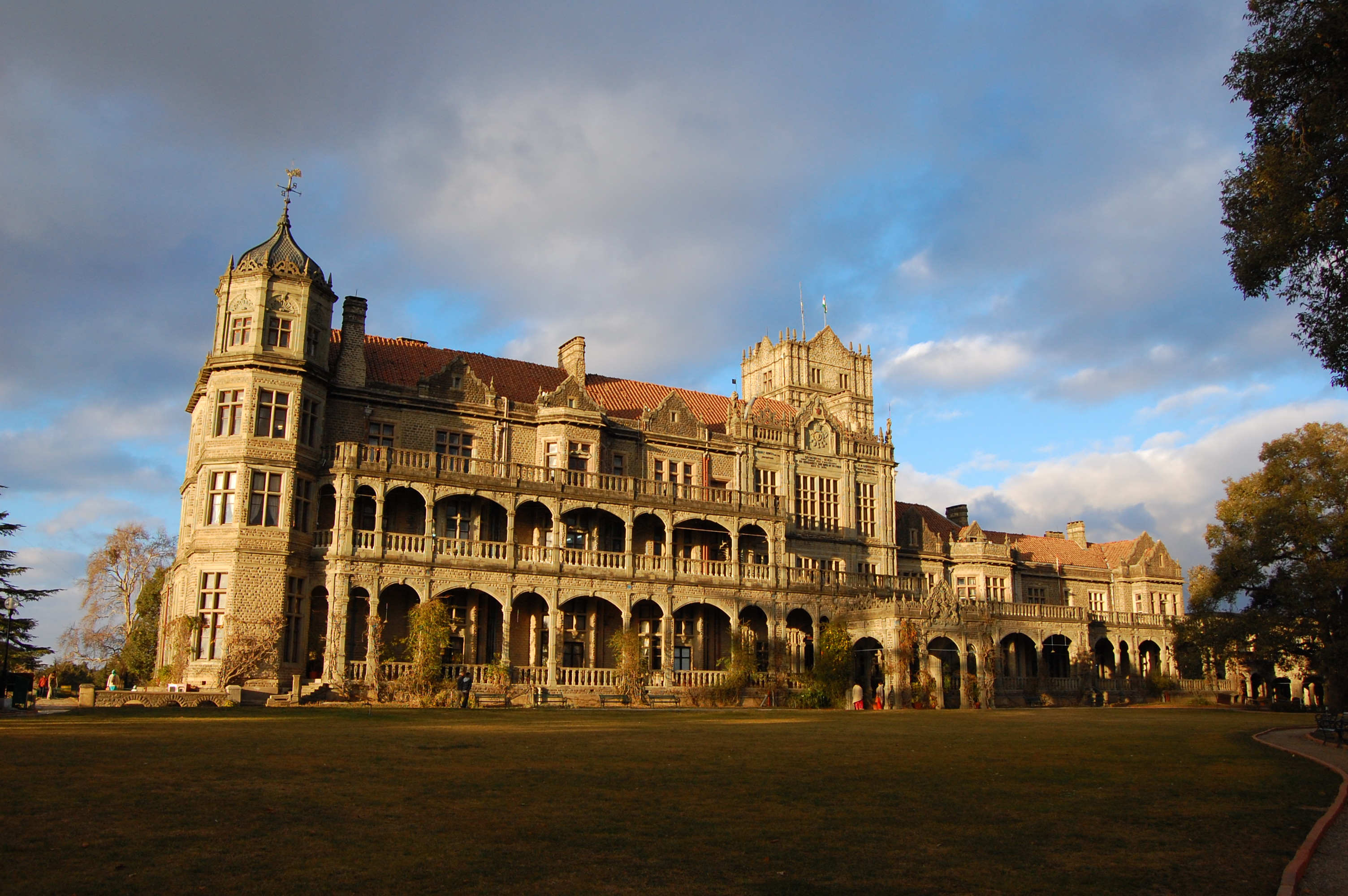
Rashtrapati Niwas (formerly Viceregal Lodge) in Shimla is an example of the Jacobethan style outside England

The Jacobethan Revival survived the late 19th century and became a part of the commercial builder's repertory through the first 20 years of the 20th century. Apart from its origins in the United Kingdom, the style became popular both in Canada and throughout the United States during those periods, for sturdy "baronial" dwellings in a free Renaissance style. A key exponent of the style in Britain was T. G. Jackson. Some examples can also be found in buildings in the former British Empire, such as Rashtrapati Niwas, the former Viceregal Lodge at Shimla in India.

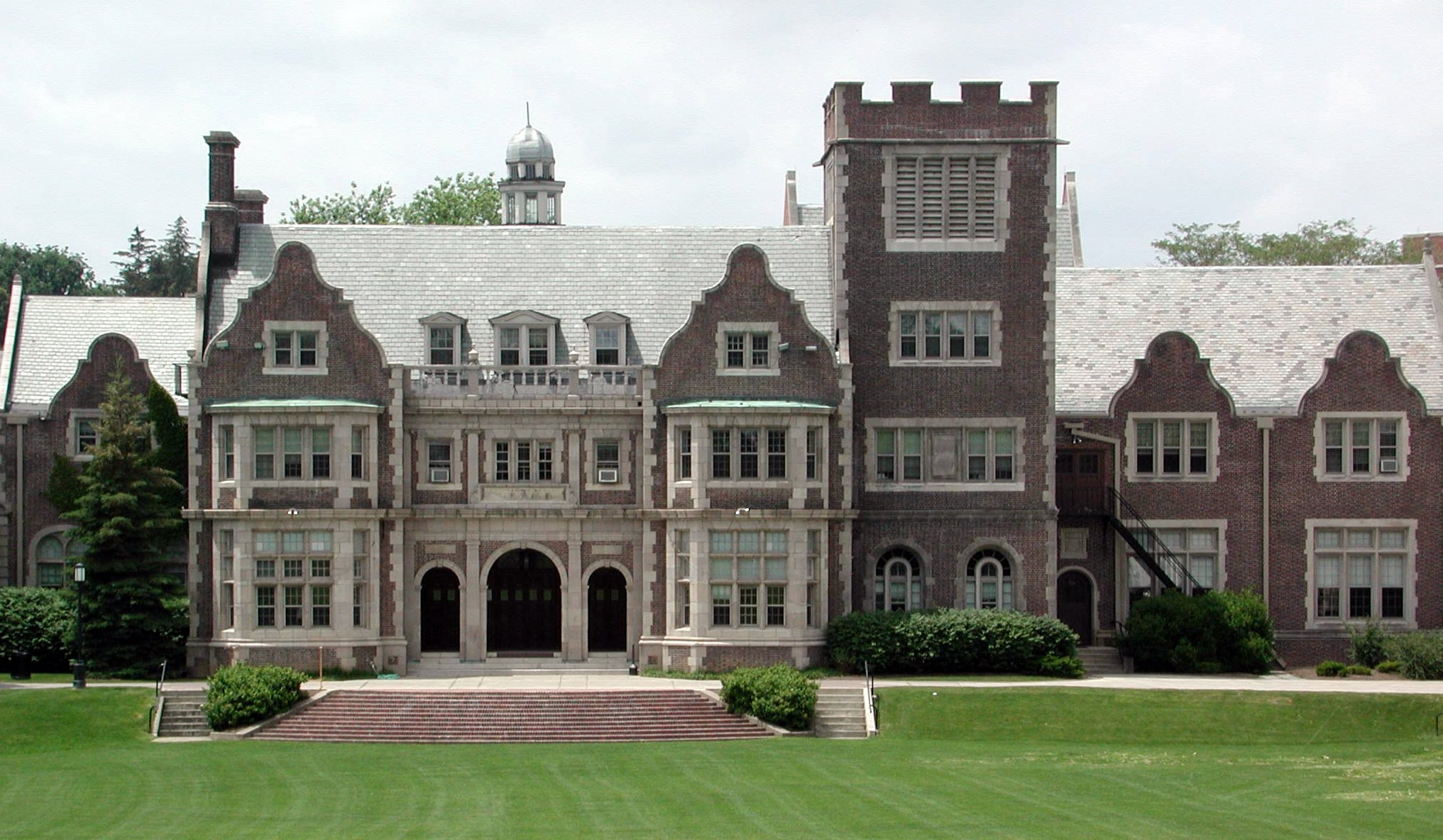
Coxe Hall, fronting the Hobart Quad. The building, named for Bishop Arthur Cleveland Coxe, is an example of Jacobethan architecture.

Excellent examples of the style in the United States are Coxe Hall, Williams Hall, and Medbury Hall, which define the West and North sides of the quadrangle of Hobart College in Geneva, NY. Further examples include Kellas, Sage, Slocum, and Weaver Halls, as well as the former Alumnae Chapel (recently converted to the Alice Dodge Wallace '38 Center for the Performing Arts) at the Emma Willard School in Troy, NY.

== See also ==
- Tudor Revival architecture
- Jacobean era

== Sources and further reading ==
- Mowl, Tim (1993). Elizabethan And Jacobean Style. London: Phaidon Press. ISBN 0-7148-2882-3.
- Newman, John; Pevsner, Nikolaus (1972). Dorset. The Buildings of England. Harmondsworth: Penguin Books. p. 55. ISBN 0-14-071044-2.
- Pevsner, Nikolaus (1962). London. The Buildings of England. Vol. I. Harmondsworth: Penguin Books. p. 477.
