= St Philip's Church, Kelsall =

Coordinates: 53.2081°N 2.7115°W

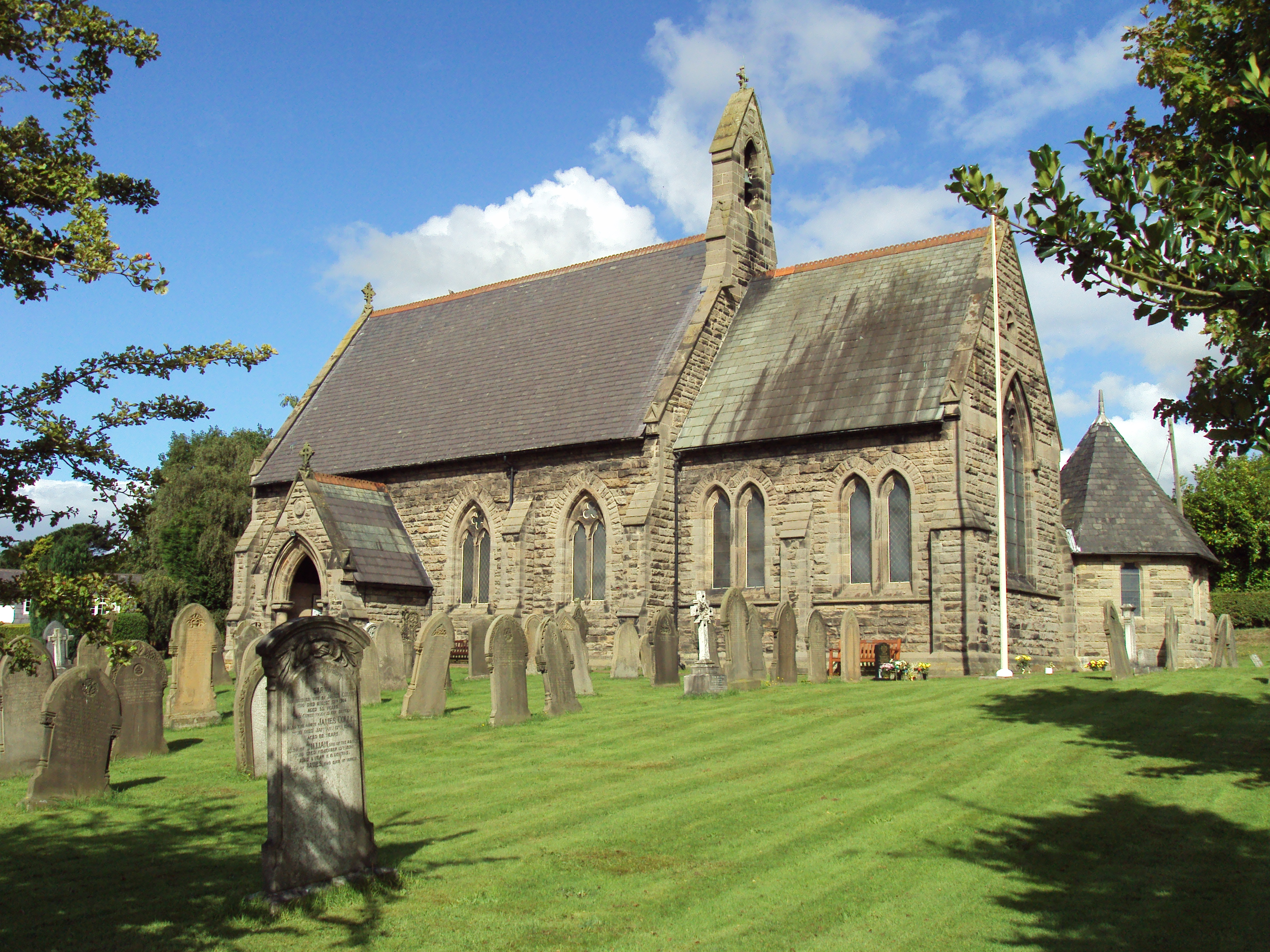
- St Philip's Church, Kelsall, from the southeast

- Location in Cheshire
- OS grid reference: SJ 526 681
- Location: Kelsall, Cheshire
- Country: England
- Denomination: Anglican
- Website: St Philip, Kelsall

History
- Status: Parish church
- Dedication: Saint Philip

Architecture
- Functional status: Active
- Heritage designation: Grade II
- Designated: 8 November 1985
- Architect: Thomas Bower
- Architectural type: Church
- Style: Gothic Revival
- Completed: 1860

Specifications
- Materials: Sandstone, slate roof

Administration
- Province: York
- Diocese: Chester
- Archdeaconry: Chester
- Deanery: Chester
- Parish: St Philip, Kelsall

Clergy
- Vicar: Revd Peter John Mackriell

St Philip's Church is in the village of Kelsall, Cheshire, England. It is an active Anglican parish church in the deanery of Chester, the archdeaconry of Chester, and the diocese of Chester. The church is recorded in the National Heritage List for England as a designated Grade II listed building.

== History ==
The church was built in 1860 to a design by Thomas Bower of Nantwich.

== Architecture ==
St Philip's is constructed in sandstone with a roof of Welsh slates and a red tiled ridge. Its architectural style is Decorated. The plan consists of a four-bay nave with a south porch, and a two-bay chancel with a north vestry. A bellcote stands on the east end of the nave. The windows along the sides of the church are divided by buttresses. In the nave the windows have two-lights with alternating quatrefoil and trefoil heads, and contain plate tracery. The chancel windows are pairs of lancets with trefoil heads. The east window has three lights, and the west window four lights. The vestry has a pyramidal roof. The two-manual organ was built in 1900 by Nicholson and Lord.

== External features ==
The churchyard contains the war graves of two soldiers of World War I, and two airmen of World War II.

== See also ==
- Listed buildings in Kelsall
