= Corporate architecture =

Use of architecture to project corporate image

Corporate architecture refers to the use of architectural design to construct physical spaces (buildings, workplaces, etc.) that can promote the image of a corporation. During the 20th century corporate architecture underwent a transformation from functional design philosophies to more creative endeavours, which are able to be an expression of the firm’s institutional identity and play a role in stakeholders’ image of the organisation.

== Definition ==
Corporate architecture is defined as a modern term for the architectural features of a corporation's building. These features are thought to communicate certain aspects of the business or the identity of the organisation as a whole. The design of these buildings is created to tell the corporation's story and is a physical manifestation of their business culture.

Researchers also suggest that corporate architecture needs a wider definition that considers a broader range of economic and social contexts. Examples of this are considerations regarding the functional flexibility of buildings and headquarters, as well as the total landscape corporate spaces create and their potential future impacts.

== History ==
Prior to the 20th century, planning for the construction of new buildings was typically based on land costs and location, with the main concerns being of “image”.

The utilitarian standards of the industrial revolution were largely reflected in 19th century corporate architecture. Building designs were purely functional, with simple and proportional styles.

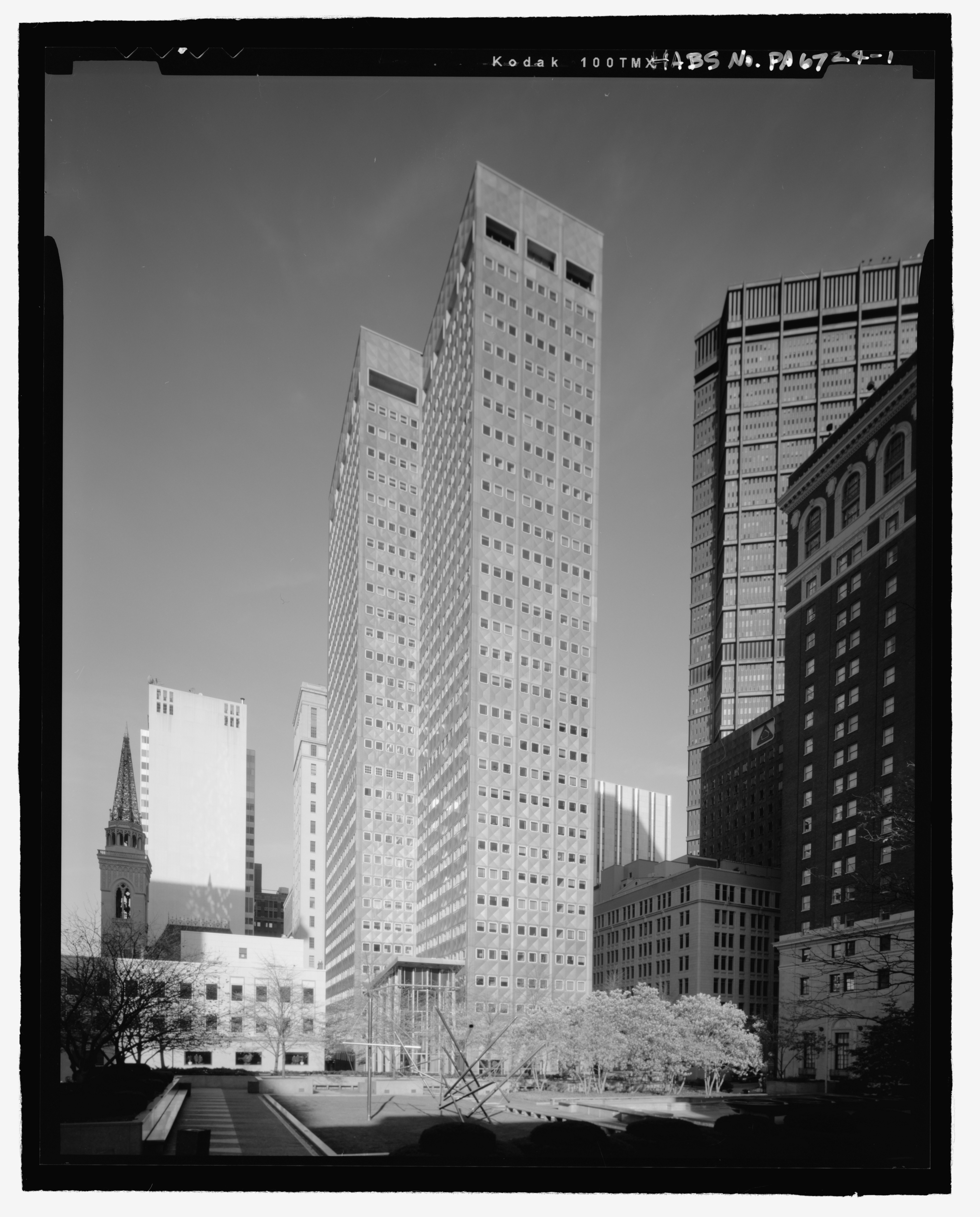
View of the Regional Enterprise Tower, built as the Alcoa Building

Over time, the economy shifted focus from production to consumption, and as this transition occurred architecture became more elaborate through use of varied shapes and symbols, as well as the use of different materials. For example, in 1911, Fagus shoe factory located in Lower Saxony, Germany, used glass to transform their buildings into light and open spaces. Inspired by these new ideas, new buildings were created in the 1900s that are regarded by experts as milestones of modern corporate architecture. American examples described by academics are the Regional Enterprise Tower (built as the Alcoa Building) in Pittsburgh, Pennsylvania (1953), Owens-Corning Fiberglass Tower in Toledo, Ohio (1969), and the AT&T Building in Manhattan, New York (1984). Some defining design features of these buildings include intricate details at the base and more sculptural forms on the higher levels with heavy use of granite and marble.

Additionally, offices used to be about cost-effectiveness; organisations packed people together into workspaces who had differing roles and expertise. However, in the early 2000s, there was a shift in the way offices were designed. Employees were physically grouped together based on their professional skills and functions in the company, allowing more interaction and collaboration in office spaces.

The study of physical space in organisational and management studies dipped in the 1970s but became more prominent again in the 1990s as more attention was given to subjects of organisational culture and has continued to endure in the early 2000s. Additionally, in the late 20th century research in multiple approaches to office design began to emerge. By the late 1990s various modes of working remotely had been enabled through IT innovations. This could introduce more de-centralised organisations, self-employment opportunities and cause large businesses to downsize. It is thought that the definition of “the office” and corporate architecture is changing.

== Function ==
The main rationale behind corporate architecture is to distinguish the organisation from its competitors. A long term, positive reputation can be created for a company when architecture is used effectively. The physical settings stakeholders of the company interact with can create an emotional impact, which aids in their identification with the firm’s organisational practices and branding. Ideally corporate architecture will result in “identification, employee attachment, job satisfaction, well-being and feelings of comfort”. In management literature, corporate architecture is studied in various research fields; organisational, strategic management, marketing and communication and brand management. As architecture is a material art form, corporate architecture provides a physical “memory space” for corporations. The idea, which posits that collective memories and identities are tied to physical spaces, makes it an important aspect of corporate heritage and marketing. Places like landmark buildings and corporate headquarters can provide visual cues which form individuals’ experiences and therefore their perceptions of the firm. This role in business can be seen in the banking sector, the perception of which was negatively impacted after the 2008 financial crisis. The industry was able to restore clients’ trust and gain consumer preference through creating corporate heritage. Another example of this can be seen in the imperial banks of the mid-1900s which operated in West Africa; Barclays Bank DCO and Standard Bank of West Africa. Bank branches preceding the late 1950s was built in a distinct colonial style, which was abandoned when the banks realised they were viewed negatively by the public as a figure of British colonialism. A modernist style of architecture was then adopted, which made no reference to the region’s colonial past.

Architecture can also produce a range of functional spaces that are accessible to employees and consumers. These spaces can be organised to assist the workflow and communication requirements of the occupation and industry. It is said that the renovation of old buildings or the construction of completely new facilities is often due to large scale strategic or economic changes. This is not only indicative of the evolving functional requirements of a company but is also a symbolic gesture of progress and advancement.

Corporate architecture can additionally be a method managers use to prompt a change of company culture. The Dutch consultancy agency Veldhoen & Company received attention from the corporate world in 2005 regarding their work with office design as multiple firms based in Denmark incorporated their spatial design ideas with the intention of using this physical change to instil new work styles from their employees. Three forms of spatial influences can be used by managers to bring about organisational change; intimidation, manipulation and seduction. Intimidation is when a feeling of domination is imposed on people. Manipulation occurs when clients or employees are being directed through the space, even when they think they are making their own independent decisions and seduction entails the process of people identifying themselves with the space.

The building an employee works in could also influence their commitment to the organisation and its brand. Because of the way images are processed in our minds, figures and forms generated through corporate design are able to create strong memories. Architecture is able to represent a brand in a 3-D, multi-sensory experience. Employees also can influence the brand even when not in customer facing roles, which is why marketing researchers have identified them as important stakeholders for brand management. Raffelt et al. recommend managers should involve employees in the design of buildings from the early stages of planning.

Regarded as an under-researched topic, another function identified by scholars which relates to the definition of corporate architecture is the idea that investing in the construction of corporate buildings can have a social impact. This is seen in the social entrepreneurship of the Italian typewriter and tool manufacturer Olivetti. It was noted by Bonfanti et al. that the construction of spacious and comfortable factories in Ivrea and Pozzuoli with high quality residential units contributed to employee well-being as well as an improved quality of life for the wider community.

== Principles and strategies ==
The design of corporate firms is a factor of an organisation’s corporate visual identity (CVI). A CVI’s main purpose is to make the firm recognisable, therefore making changes can take significant time and investment. Frequently, these changes occur because of business strategy shifts, mergers, acquisitions and other large-scale events. It is said when companies have good reputations, this shift usually happens slowly. Key aspects put forth by van den Bosch et al. of how CVI affects firms are visibility, distinctiveness, authenticity, transparency and consistency.

Research suggests that certain architectural styles are associated with a specific corporate image or brand personality. Two main styles identified are functionalist (focusing on simple and rational forms which are purely for function) and experiential architecture (complex and eclectic forms which serve as creative expression). Additionally, two brand personality traits: competence and excitement, are explored, with each trait seen as opposites on a spectrum. It was generally found that experiential architecture designs were more associated with an exciting brand, whereas functionalist design was perceived as more of a competent brand. Corporate buildings that were considered as moderate versions of either style, situated closer to the centre point of the spectrum, were positively described as natural and harmonious. The researchers recommend that managers should ask for a particular architectural style once a desired corporate image is decided upon.

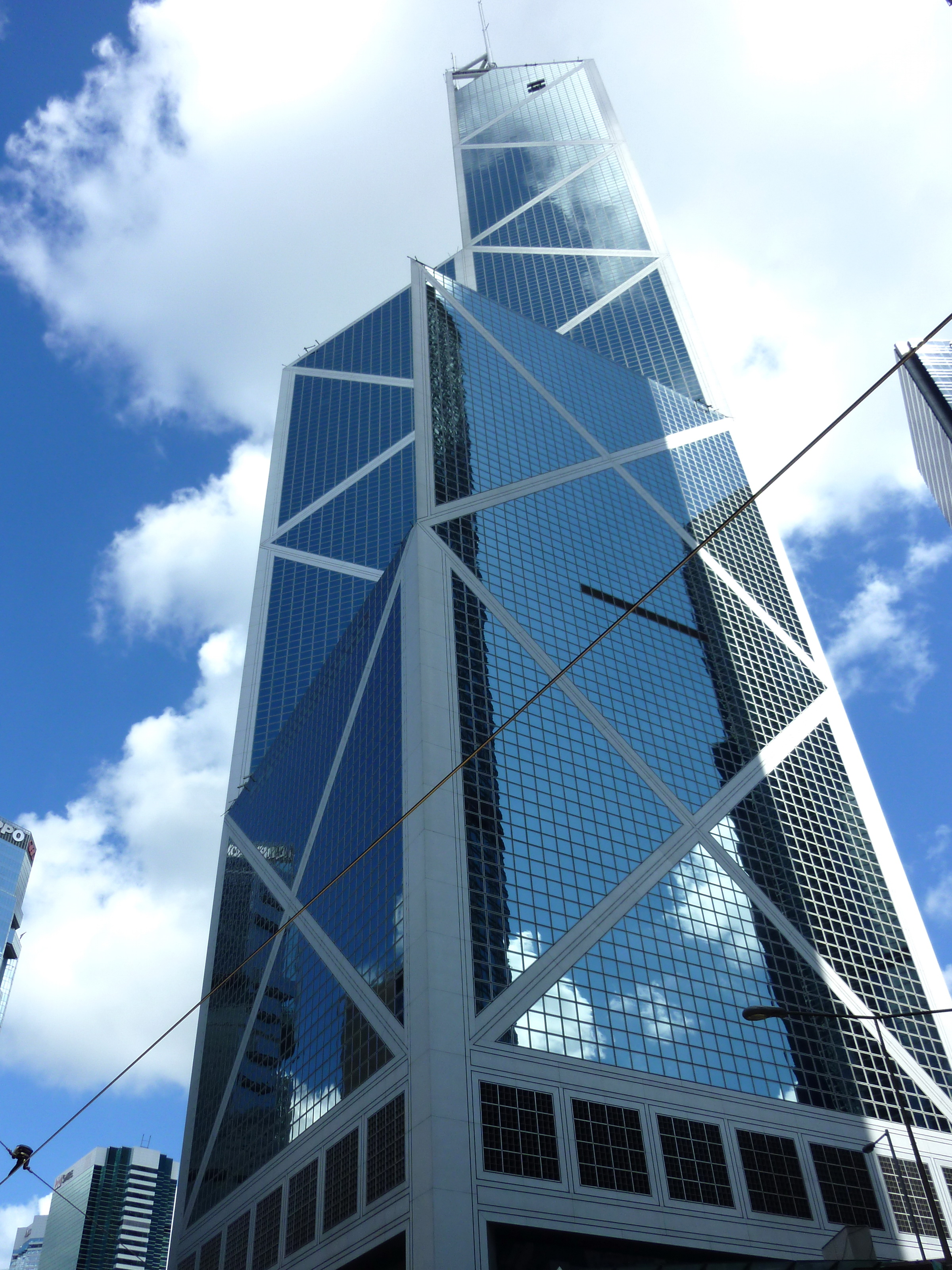
Bank of China Tower in Hong Kong

A common philosophy used when designing corporate buildings in the Pan-Pacific region is feng shui. It is a traditional Chinese architectural theory which involves the construction of a physical space that is deemed as harmonious. According to a Taiwanese survey 70% of the countries’ firms believe that feng shui can generate good fortune in business and pay for feng shui related consultation on design and construction projects. As this philosophy affects the construction of corporate spaces, whether a building is seen to have a good feng shui design can affect the image of the company in the eyes of stakeholders who believe in the theory. An example is Hong Kong’s Bank of China Tower, the design of which has caused controversy due to its facade of linked triangle shapes that considered to be “bad feng shui”.

Corporate architecture can contribute to a firm’s corporate heritage by creating distinct symbols which aid in the transformation of a generic brand into an iconic one The continuous use and pursuit of specific architectural features can imbue a company with “heritage distinctiveness” if it has continued to exist over many years. This sense of history and tradition can be represented through the use of corporate architecture. An example cited by experts is IKEA and their use of images in marketing material depicting an old barn where the company first started its operations. There has also been the introduction of corporate buildings which incorporate the concept of flexibility and change within the design that reflects movement. Martin Kornberger and Stewart Clegg say that these buildings possess five distinct characteristics; a balance of chaos and order, flexibility, ability to generate problems, movement and design.

In literature there have been various assertions made about how symbols in corporate buildings relate to certain functions, such as boosting creativity. It is thought that certain aspects of design can elicit specific behaviours e.g. hamburger chains that strictly standardise outlets will have more standardised employee conduct. Additionally, selecting the conditions and stimulus of a space create specific ambiences which can work in a company’s favour. For example, it is found that employee productivity is affected by factors like light, sound, openness and ventilation. Hatch additionally said that her research showed that the two main roles office design has in an organisation is communication behaviour of the employees and their perceived status. Experts additionally remark the need for clear goals, defined purpose, careful construction and clear communication of plans between architects and managers.
