= Thomas Bower =

English architect and surveyor

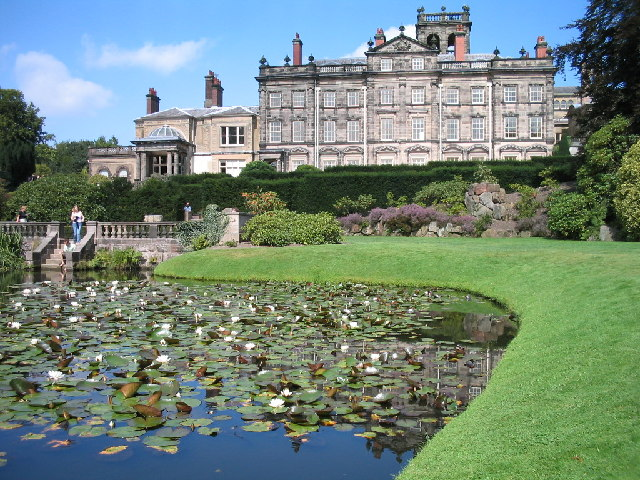
Biddulph Grange

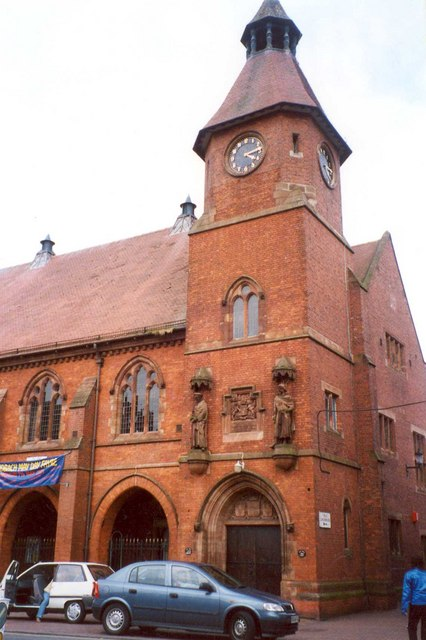
Sandbach Town Hall

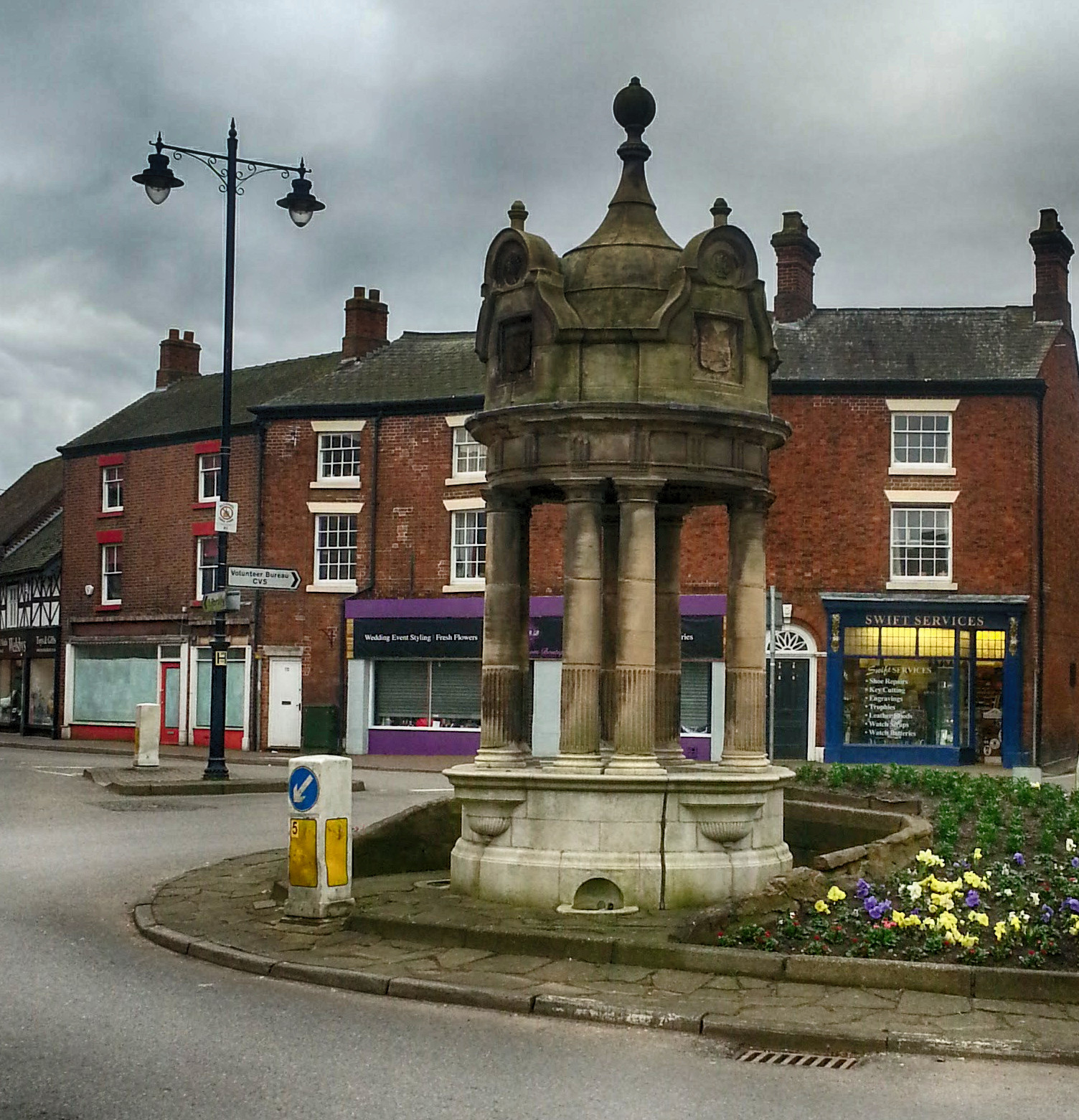
Sandbach Town Hall

Thomas Bower (1835–1919) was an English architect and surveyor based in Nantwich, Cheshire. Thomas Bower (1835–1919) was an English architect and surveyor based in Nantwich, Cheshire.

== Early life and education ==
Bower was baptised at Nantwich on 24 November 1835, the son of Thomas and Annette Bower.

At the time of the 1851 census, aged 15, Bower was recorded as a scholar at Audlem Grammar School, with his birthplace given as Nantwich.

Bower subsequently trained as an architect under Sir George Gilbert Scott. Writing in 1883, James Hall described Bower as a "native resident, and pupil of Sir Gilbert Scott".

== Career ==
Bower established an architectural and surveying practice in Nantwich. His early works included St Philip's Church, Kelsall and the rebuilding of the Lamb Hotel in Hospital Street, Nantwich.

In 1878 Bower directed repairs to the south porch of St Mary's Church, Nantwich. Hall's contemporary history identifies Bower as the architect responsible for the work.

In 1905 Bower entered into partnership with Ernest Harcourt Edleston (1880–1964). Edleston's obituary in 1964 stated that, after qualifying as an architect, he joined Bower at Nantwich to form the firm of Bower, Edleston and Co.

He worked in partnership with Ernest H. Edleston at the Nantwich firm Bower & Edleston, which he founded in 1854. He is particularly associated with the Gothic Revival style of architecture.

In 1883, Bower was living at 140–142 Hospital Street in Nantwich. In 1914, he and Edleston had offices at Bank Chambers on Churchyard Side in the town square.

== Works ==
Bower's buildings include:

- St Philip's Church, Kelsall (1860)
- Lamb Hotel (now Chatterton House), Hospital Street, Nantwich (1861)
- Spurstow School, Spurstow (1872)
- Cemetery chapels at Audlem (1873–74)
- Barclays Bank, 11 Churchyard Side, Nantwich (1876)
- Free Library (now Nantwich Museum), Nantwich (1888)
- Sandbach Town Hall (1889)
- Vicarage, Narrow Lane, Crewe Green (1889)
- Remodelling of 148 Hospital Street, Nantwich (1890s)
- Petton Hall, Petton, Shropshire
- Biddulph Grange, Biddulph, Staffordshire (1896)
- Alterations to Crewe Hall, Crewe Green (1896)
- Drinking fountain, Sandbach (1897)
