= District Bank =

District Bank Limited
- Type: Joint-stock
- Industry: Banking
- Founded: 1829; 197 years ago
- Defunct: 1970; 56 years ago
- Fate: Acquisition by National Provincial Bank (1962)
- Successor: National Westminster Bank
- Headquarters: 55 King Street, Manchester 2
- Parent: National Provincial Bank
- Subsidiaries: County Bank Limited

The Manchester and Liverpool District Bank was formed in 1829 and it became one of the leading provincial joint stock banks; its name was shortened to District Bank in 1924. The Bank was acquired by the National Provincial Bank in 1962 but kept its identity until the latter’s merger with Westminster Bank.

== History ==
=== The Manchester and Liverpool District Banking Company ===
Joseph Macardy was an Irishman who became the senior partner of a firm of Manchester stockbrokers and in 1828 he became involved in the establishment of a new joint stock bank in the city. However, when his proposal to open branches in all the neighbouring towns was rejected, he immediately issued a prospectus for a new bank, specifically to have branches, and to be called either the District Banking Company or the Union Banking Company. In the event, the bank duly opened in 1829 under the name Manchester and Liverpool District Banking; its success was such that by 1877 Grindon described it as "first and foremost among provincial joint-stock banks".

The bank actually opened first in Stockport in 1829 but this was through the acquisition of the local bank, Christy Lloyd. Christy and Company were "celebrated" London hatters and it was the founder’s son, William Miller-Christy, who supported a local hatter, John Worsley, to set up a bank in Stockport. Christy Lloyd opened in 1824 "and the hatters of Stockport thereafter received such financial advantage over hatters in other areas, that in due time Stockport became world famous for that product".

In 1830, a year after acquiring Christy, the bank opened its Manchester office. As promised, branches were opened in a number of local towns, not forgetting the important branch in Liverpool, thereby justifying the bank’s lengthy title; by 1833 there were 17 branches. Acquisitions reinforced the branch openings, the first being in 1844 – the Nantwich and Cheshire Bank, founded five years earlier. This was followed in 1863 by the more substantial purchase of Lloyd Entwistle of Manchester. Lloyd Entwistle had descended from the firm of John Jones "bankers and tea dealers", already established in the 1770s. In 1848, Jones Lloyd as it then was, separated its London and Manchester businesses. New partners were brought into the Manchester office (the Entwistle being Lloyds’ son-in-law).

The Manchester and Liverpool District Banking Company assumed limited liability in 1880 by which time there were 54 branches stretching across to Yorkshire and down to Staffordshire. An all-important London office was opened five years later. A major expansion of the bank’s coverage took place in 1907 with the acquisition of the Lancaster Bank, which had 57 branches in the north of Lancashire compared to the 118 of the Liverpool and Manchester.

=== District Bank ===
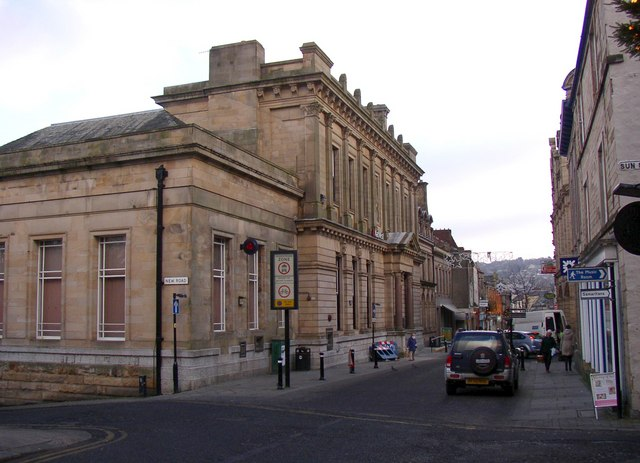
The Lancaster branch on Church Street, built 1870, now NatWest

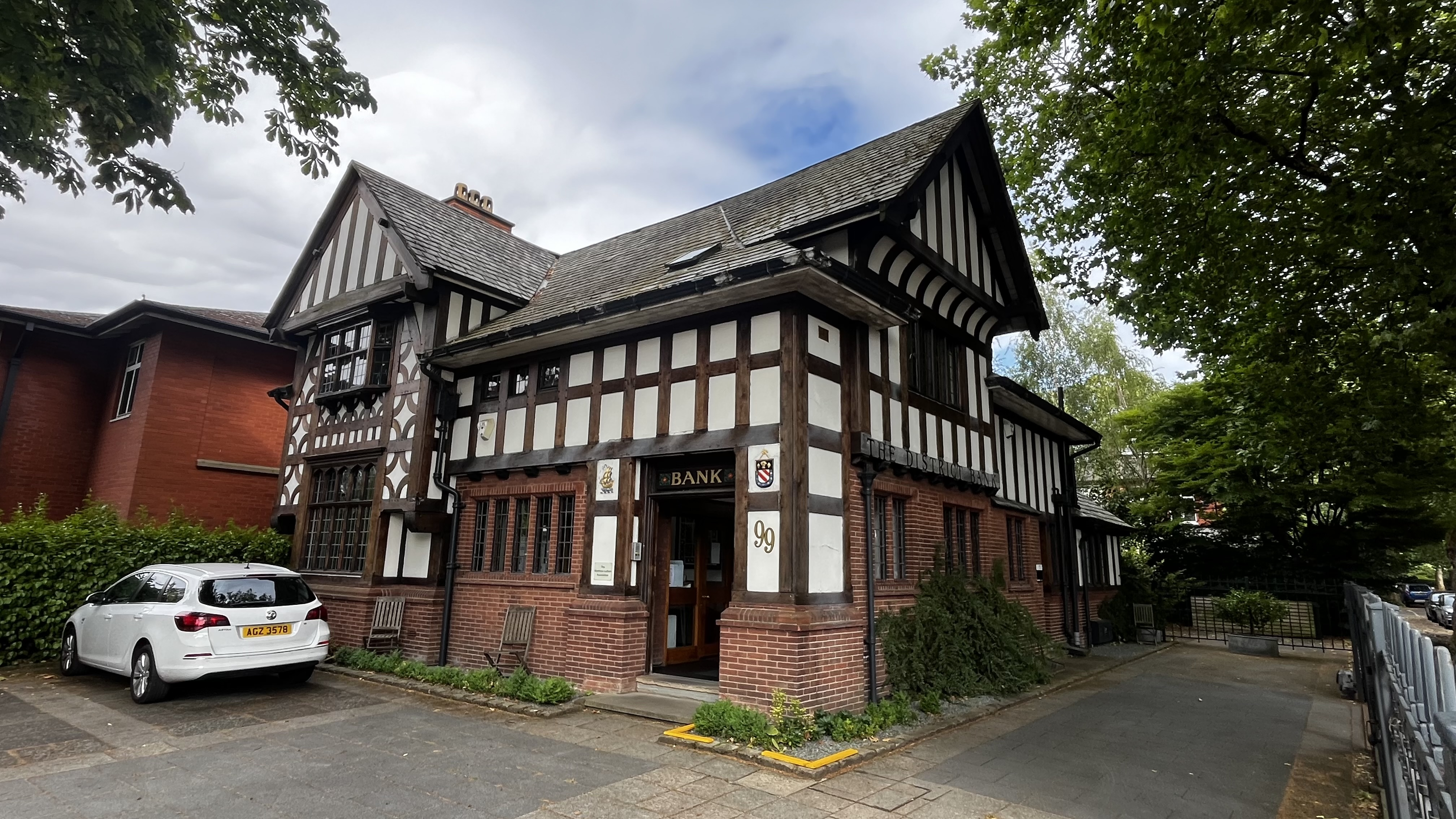
The former District Bank (1915) in West Didsbury, Manchester

Growth continued apace after World War I and by 1924 another 130 branches had been opened. That year also marked the shortening of the name to the District Bank, by which it had been popularly known for some time. A further major expansion came in 1935 with the acquisition of the County Bank. The Manchester and County Bank commenced business in 1862 and three branches were opened shortly after. In 1866 the bank acquired the Saddleworth Banking Company and in 1871 the Bank of Stockport. By the time of its acquisition by the District, Manchester and County had 190 branches and sub-branches. Following the amalgamation, District was admitted to the London Bankers' Clearing House.

The District Bank now determined to make itself a national bank and branches were opened throughout the midlands, the south and Wales. Following the end of World War II more branches were opened particularly in London and the south coast. However, in 1962 the District itself became victim of another bank’s desire for comprehensive national coverage and it was acquired by the National Provincial Bank. The District kept its separate board in Manchester until the 1968 merger of National Provincial and Westminster Bank.

The District, National Provincial and Westminster banks were fully integrated in the new firm's structure, while Coutts & Co. private bankers, Ulster Bank and the Isle of Man Bank continued as separate operations. The statutory process of integration was completed in 1969 and the new company, National Westminster Bank, opened its doors for business on 1 January 1970, ending 140 years of independent trading.

== Notable employees ==
- Former British prime minister John Major worked for the bank from 1965-66.

== Bibliography ==
- Ashby, J. F. The Story of the Banks Hutchinson & Co., London, 1934
- Reed, Richard National Westminster Bank: A Short History National Westminster Bank, London, 1989
