= History of Northwich =

The history of Northwich can be traced back to the Roman period. The area around Northwich has been exploited for its salt pans since this time. The town has been severely affected by salt mining with subsidence historically being a large issue. A programme of mine stabilisation has recently been undertaken.

Northwich is a wich town in Cheshire, England. It lies in the heart of the Cheshire Plain, at the confluence of the River Weaver and the River Dane. The town is approximately 18 miles (29.0 km) east of Chester and 15 miles (24.1 km) south of Warrington.

== Roman Northwich ==
The first references to Northwich are during Roman times when the town was known as Condate, thought to be a Latinized form of a Brittonic name meaning "Confluence". There are several other places by this name, mostly in France; in Northwich's case, it lies near the junction of the rivers Dane and Weaver.

Northwich can be identified through two contemporary Roman documents. The first of these is the Antonine Itinerary, a 3rd-century road map split into fourteen sections. Itinerary II is called "the route from the Vallum to the port of Rutupiae". It describes the route between Hadrian's Wall in northern England and Richborough on the Kent coast. The station Condate is listed 18 miles from Mamucium (now Manchester) and 20 miles from Deva Victrix (now Chester). Itinerary X is called "the route from Glannoventa to Mediolanum" and details the route between Ravenglass fort, Cumbria and Mediolanum (now Whitchurch, Shropshire). In this description Condate is described as 19 miles before the routes end at Whitchurch and, again, as 18 miles from Manchester.

The second document is the 7th-century Ravenna Cosmography. Again this document refers to Condate between the entries for Salinae (now Middlewich, Cheshire) and Ratae (now Leicester, Leicestershire), at the time the capital of the Corieltauvi tribe.

The Roman's interest in the Northwich area is thought to be due to the strategic river crossing and the location of the salt brines. Salt was very important in Roman society. The Roman word salarium, linked employment, salt and soldiers, but the exact link is unclear. It is also theorised that this is the basis for the modern word salary. Another theory is that the word soldier itself comes from the Latin sal dare (to give salt). See History of salt for further details. There is archaeological evidence of a Roman auxiliary fort within the area of Northwich now known as "Castle" dated to 70 AD. This and other North West forts were built as the Romans moved north from their stronghold in Chester.

The fort was situated on the west side of the River Weaver. The excavation of the fort started from 1983 onwards and reveals two phases of military presence. The initial one commenced around AD 70, and the subsequent one concluded around AD 140. The fort was more compact during its second occupation. Excavations discovered the remains of barrack blocks and courtyard building thought to be a Praetorium, or commandant's house.

The Romans used lead salt pans to extract the salt from the brine. Salt pans and 1st-century brine kilns have all been found around the Roman fort.

== Medieval ==
The association with salt continues in the etymology of Northwich. The "wich" (or wych) suffix applies to other towns in the area - namely Middlewich, Nantwich and Leftwich. This is considered to have been derived from the Norse, "wic", for bay and is associated with the more traditional method of obtaining salt from evaporating sea water. Therefore, a place for making salt became a wych-house; and Northwich was the most northern of the Wich towns in Cheshire.

The existence of Northwich in the early medieval period is shown by its record in the Domesday Book:

In the same Mildestuic hundred there was a third wich called Norwich [Northwich] and it was at farm for £8.

There were the same laws and customs there as there were in the other wiches and the king and the earl similarly divided the renders.
... All the other customs in these wiches are the same.

This was waste when (Earl) Hugh received it; it is now worth 35s.

— Henry Ellis, A General Introduction to Domesday Book

It shows that by 1086 the town was producing salt and was valued the same as Middlewich at £8, although less than the £21 value given to Nantwich. It is unclear if salt extraction had continued from the Roman to Medieval periods.

The manor of Northwich belonged to the Earls of Chester. However, in 1237 the family line died out. Subsequently, Northwich became a royal manor and was given to a noble family to collect tolls in exchange for a set rent. By 1484 this family was the Stanley's, later Earls of Derby and stayed in the family's hands until the late 18th century.

That salt production continued throughout the centuries can be seen through John Leland's description of the town in 1540:

Northwich is a pratie market town but fowle,

and by the Salters houses be great stakes of smaul cloven wood,

to seethe the salt water that thei make white salt of.

— cited in Fred H. Crossley, Cheshire

Although Leland described Northwich as a market town, there is no surviving charter for a market or fair. A market still exists today.

Between 1642 and 1643, during the English Civil War, Northwich was fortified and garrisoned by Sir William Bereton for the Parliamentarians.

== Salt rediscovered ==
The salt beds beneath Northwich were re-discovered in the 1670s by employees of the local Smith-Barry family. The Smith-Barrys were looking for coal, but instead discovered rock salt, in the grounds of the family home, Marbury Hall, to the north of Northwich. Soon salt mining started again. This mining area is now known as Dairy House Meadow.

By 1732 the River Weaver was improved from Frodsham Bridge to Winsford Bridge and eventually allowed vessels up to 160 tonnes (160,000 kg) to travel up to Northwich Bridge. This allowed salt to be transported by boat rather than cart. The Trent and Mersey Canal, opened in 1775, passed to the north of Northwich because of objections from the trustees of the Weaver Navigation. However, the canal passed salt deposits near the village of Marston, and many of the later salt works were based along its banks including the Lion Salt Works and New Cheshire Salt Works. The Anderton Boat Lift was opened in 1875 to connect the canal and river systems.

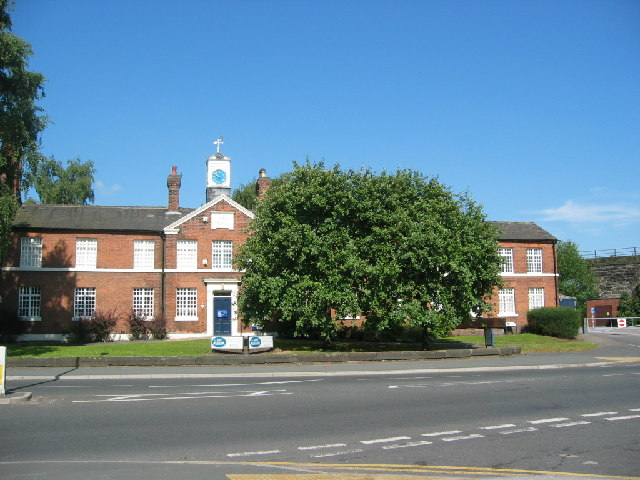
Weaver Hall Museum, previously the workhouse

An important development occurred when it became uneconomical to mine for the salt. Instead hot water was pumped through the mines, which dissolved the salt. The resultant brine was pumped out and the salt extracted from the brine. This technique weakened the mines and led to land subsidence as they collapsed. Subsidence affected the town and the surrounding landscape. For example, collapses in 1880 formed Witton Flash as the River Weaver flowed into a huge hole caused by subsidence. Subsidence also allegedly accounts for many old timber-framed houses in the town centre, which were better able to withstand the movement of the ground. Some houses were built on a base of steel girders which could be jacked up to level the house with each change in the underlying ground. The town's historical link with the salt industry is celebrated in its Museum which is today located in the town's old workhouse.

== Victorian expansion ==
The 19th century saw major changes for the town. A local board was founded on 26 June 1863 under the provisions of the Local Government Act 1858 to serve the original thirteen acres of the manor of Northwich. In 1875 this merged with its much larger neighbour at Witton cum Twambrooks were amalgamated, and the resultant area was further extended in 1880 to include the whole of Castle Northwich and parts of Hartford, Winnington and Leftwich. On 10 September 1894 these areas were united as the civil parish of Northwich, served by Northwich Urban District Council. Further expansion took place in 1936 by the addition of parts of Winnington, Lostock Gralam, Barnton, Leftwich and Rudheath, and again in 1955 when parts of Davenham, Hartford, Rudheath and Whatcroft were added

Railways first came to the town in 1863 when the line from Manchester Central was extended from Knutsford by the Cheshire Midland Railway. An extension to Helsby was completed by the West Cheshire Railway in 1869. Both of these lines became constituents of the Cheshire Lines Committee on 15 August 1867. The line is now marketed as the Mid-Cheshire line.

== Chemical industry ==
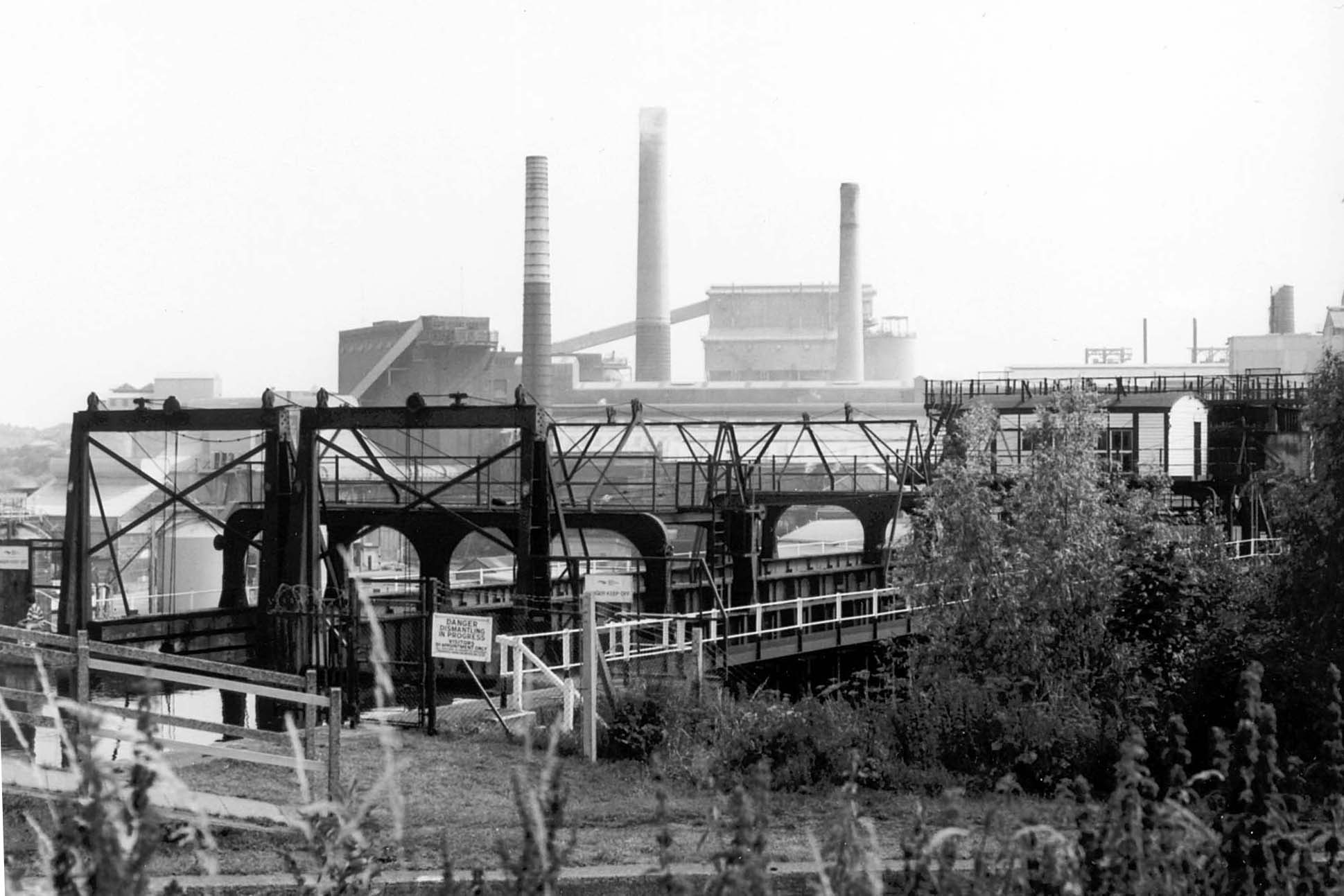
Winnington Works

In 1874, John Brunner and Ludwig Mond founded Brunner Mond in Winnington and started manufacturing soda ash using the Solvay ammonia-soda process. This process used salt as a main raw material.

The chemical industry used the subsided land for the disposal of waste from the manufacture of soda-ash. The waste was transported through a network of cranes and rails to the produce limebeds. This was a dangerous alkaline substance and caused the landscape to be abandoned as unusable.

Brunner Mond later amalgamated with three other chemical companies in 1926 to form Imperial Chemical Industries, better known as ICI, which was for many years one of Europe's leading chemical companies in both chemical production and research.

== Reclamation ==
In 1975 Marbury Country Park was the first area to be reclaimed from dereliction and has become a popular recreational area.

In 1987 more land was reclaimed to form Furey Wood and over later years, Cheshire County Council's Land Regeneration Unit reclaimed what is now known as Anderton Nature Park, Witton Flash, Dairy House Meadows, Witton Mill Meadows, and Ashton's and Neumann's Flashes. Much of the funding for the creation of these public areas has been supplied from the North West Development Agency and now extends to approximately 323 hectares of public space known as Northwich Community Woodlands.

== Salt mine stabilisation ==
In February 2004 a £28 million programme to stabilise the abandoned salt mines underneath Northwich was begun. The work was funded by the English Partnerships through its Land Stabilisation Programme, introduced to resolve issues associated with unstable mines around England.

The four mines identified for work were Baron's Quay, Witton Bank, Neumann's and Penny's Lane. These mines were chosen because their subsidence was causing problems for the town centre.

When they were abandoned the mines were left with supporting salt pillars. Modern salt mining leaves around 30% of the salt to form the pillars but, because of the wild-brine pumping, the 19th century mines under Northwich were left with sometimes only 5% of the salt to form the pillars which has since been found to be inadequate. To provide additional support in the 1920s brine was used to flood the mines. However ground movement has been detected and has effectively ceased development in Northwich town centre.

The current stabilisation plan involves removing millions of litres of brine from the four mines and replacing it with a mixture of pulverised fuel ash (PFA), cement and salt. The PFA arrives by rail; the cement and salt by road. The grout is mixed at Brunner Mond, Winnington from where it is pumped via a pipeline into the mines through a series of boreholes around the town.

The removed brine is pumped in the opposite direction to Winnington and then taken by train to British Salt in Middlewich. Here the brine is put to use in many products such as water softeners and road de-icers.

The project was completed in late 2007.

== Future ==
Following the stabilisation of the mines, Northwich is to be developed in line with the 'Vision for Northwich'. The vision, if completed, will see the old concrete County Council buildings and Magistrates Court demolished and replaced with more modern buildings.

New housing developments continue to appear around Northwich. In 2002 the Drill Field, the world's oldest football ground, was demolished and has been replaced by housing as Northwich Victoria football club sold the ground to relieve debt.

A Debenhams store is planned to be built at Barons Quay along with a cinema and 40 new shops.

== See also ==
- Salt in Cheshire
- History of Cheshire
