= Economy of Cheshire =

Cheshire is a county in north-west England, famous for its agricultural industry. Cheshire is active in many key economic areas: automotive, bio-technology, chemical, financial services, food and drink, ICT, and tourism. The county is famous for the production of Cheshire cheese, salt and silk.

== Agriculture ==
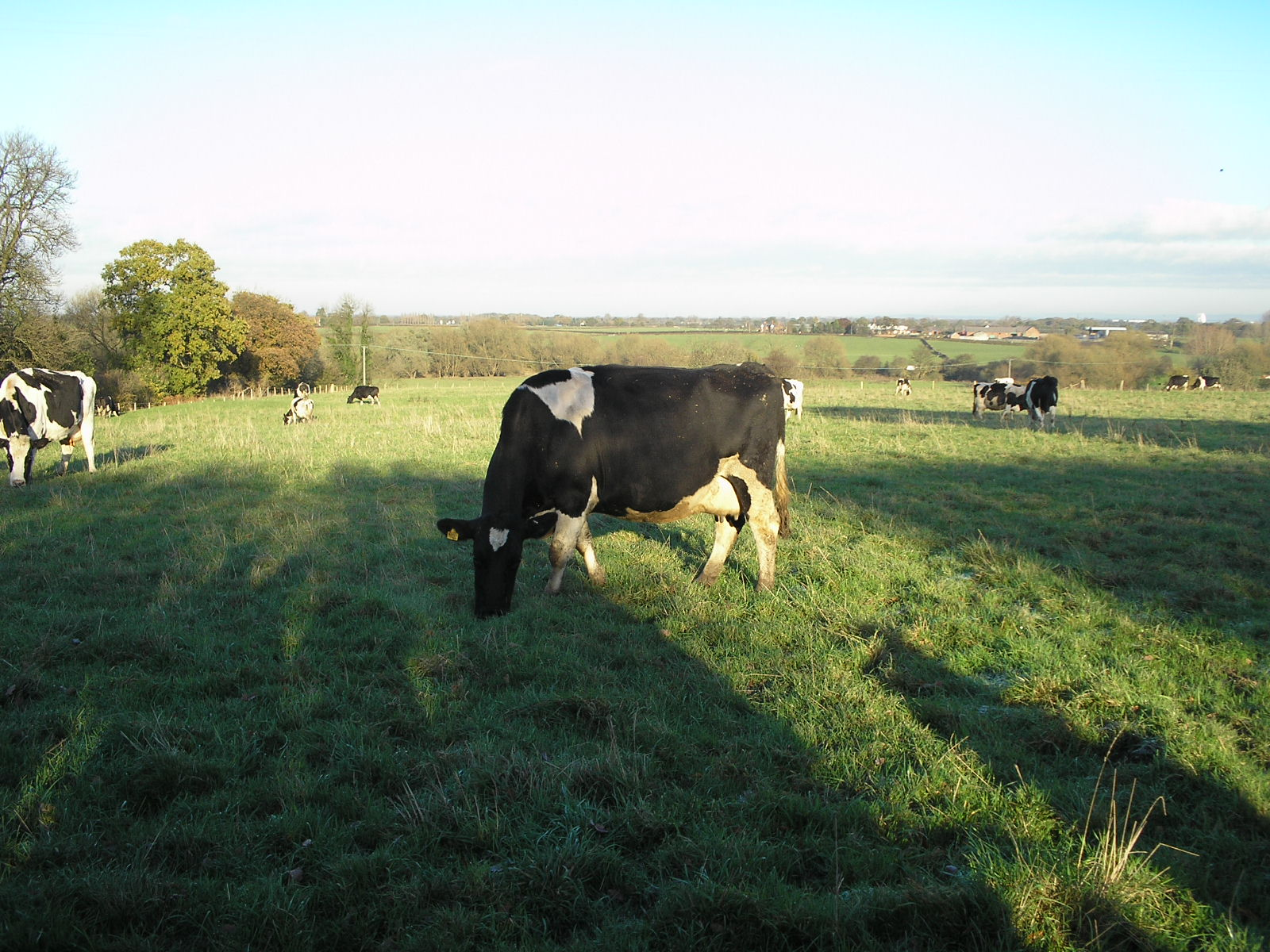
Cattle farming in the county

Cheshire is a mainly rural county with a high concentration of villages. Agriculture is generally based around the dairy trade and cattle are the predominant livestock. The number of holdings and hectares of agricultural land can be seen in the following table:

	2002	2003	2004	2005
Agricultural land (hectares)	148,442	153,653	158,143	155,795
Number of holdings	5,135	4,390	4,409	4,609

Based on holdings by EC farm type in 2005, 851 hectares were allocated to dairy farming, with another 1,178 hectares allocated to cattle and sheep.

== Petrochemical and chemical industry ==
The chemical industry in Cheshire was founded in the Roman times with the mining of salt in Middlewich and Northwich. Salt is still mined in this area by British Salt. The salt mining has led to a continued chemical industry around Northwich, with Brunner Mond based in the town. More chemical companies, including Ineos (formerly ICI) have plants at Runcorn.

The Stanlow Refinery is at Ellesmere Port. The oil refinery has operated since 1924 and has a capacity of 12 million tonnes per year.

== Transport industry ==
Crewe was once the centre of the British railway industry. The Crewe railway works is a British railway engineering facility built in 1840 by the Grand Junction Railway. At is peak the works employed 20,000 people, though this is now less than 1000. The town's station remains a major railway junction.

Crewe is also the home of Bentley cars. Also within Cheshire are manufacturing plants for Jaguar and Vauxhall Motors in Ellesmere Port.

The county also has an aircraft industry. The BAE Systems facility at Woodford Aerodrome was home to the production of Avro Lancaster and Avro Vulcan bombers and the Hawker-Siddeley Nimrod. It is still part of BAE System's Military Air Solutions division. On the Cheshire border with Flintshire, Wales is the Broughton aircraft factory, more recently associated with Airbus.

== Tourism ==
Tourism in Cheshire from both within the UK and overseas continues to perform strongly. Over 8 million nights of accommodation (both UK & Overseas) and over 2.8 million visits to Cheshire were recorded during 2003.

== Trends ==
At the start of 2003, there were 22,020 VAT registered enterprises in Cheshire, increased by 7% since 1998. Most registered businesses in Cheshire were in two broad sectors, namely Business Services (31.9%) and Wholesale/ Retail (21.7%).

Between 2002 and 2003 the number businesses grew in four sectors: Public Administration and Other Services (6.0%), Hotels & Restaurants (5.1%), Construction (1.7%) and Business Services (1.0%).

The county saw the largest proportional reduction between 2001 and 2002 in employment in the 'Energy and Water' sector and there was also a significant reduction in the Manufacturing sector. The largest growth during this period was in the 'Other Services' and 'Distribution, Hotels and Retail' sector.

The following table is a chart of trend of regional gross value added of the non-metropolitan county of Cheshire at 2004 basic prices.

Year	Regional Gross Value Added	Agriculture	Industry	Services
1995	11,828	272	4,673	6,883
2000	14,879	188	5,049	9,641
2003	17,159	225	4,988	11,945

Table notes:

- Figures are in millions of British Pounds Sterling (£)
- Components may not sum to totals due to rounding
- Agriculture includes hunting and forestry
- Industry includes energy and construction
- Services includes financial intermediation services indirectly measured

== See also ==
- Salt in Cheshire
- Silk Industry of Cheshire
- List of textile mills in Cheshire
