= Lion Salt Works =

Historic site near Northwich, England

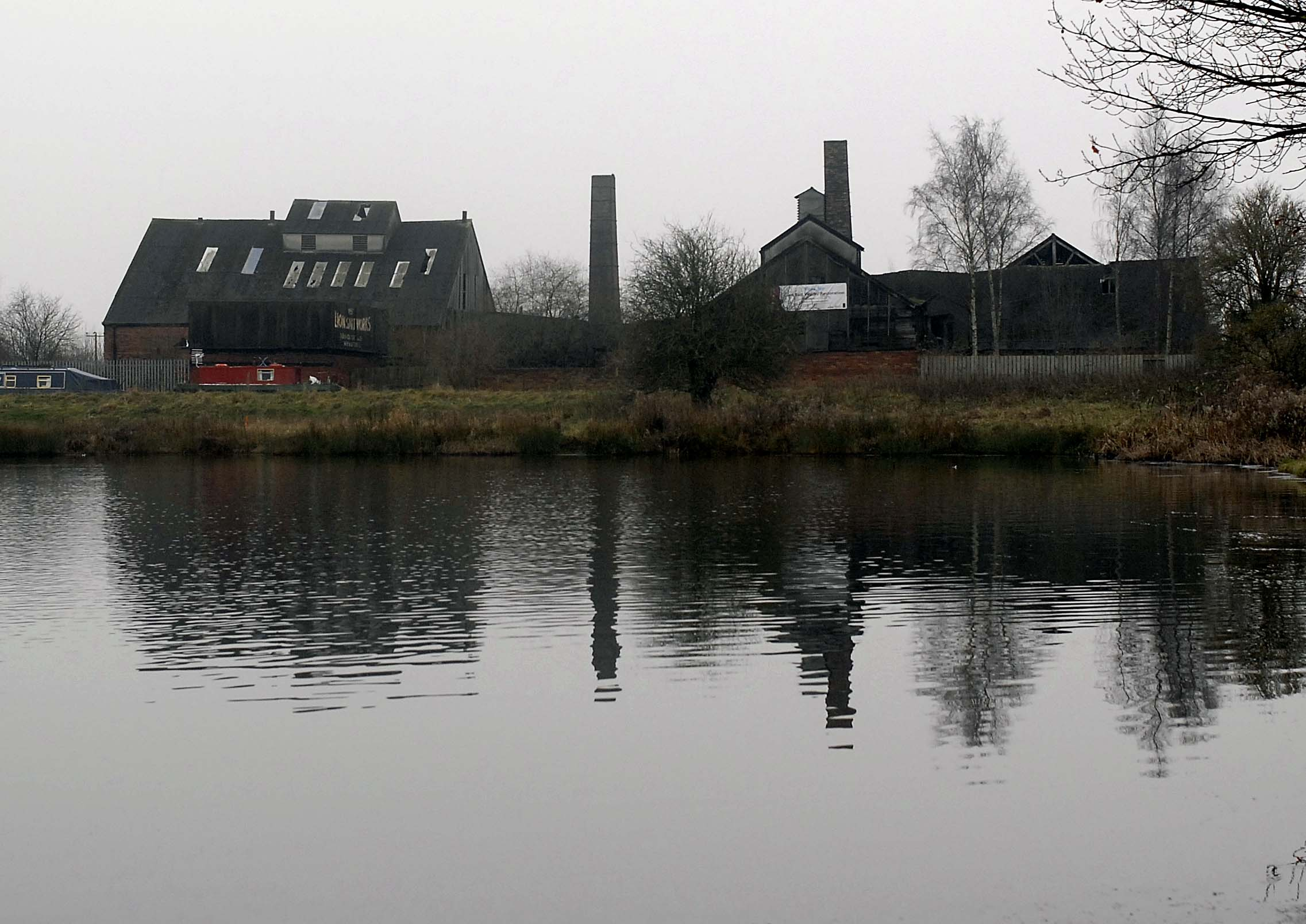
- Lion Salt Works in 2006

- Location in Cheshire
- 53.2753°N 2.4952°W
- Location: Marston, near Northwich, England
- OS grid reference: SJ 670 754

History
- Founded: 1894
- Built for: John Thompson Junior

Site notes
- Website: lionsaltworks.westcheshiremuseums.co.uk

Listed Building – Grade II
- Designated: 19 August 1986
- Reference no.: 1139103, 1160985, 1329875, 1329876

The Lion Salt Works is the UK's last remaining open pan salt works, in Marston, near Northwich, Cheshire, England. It closed as a works in 1986 and is now preserved as a museum.

== History ==
John Thompson Junior and his son Henry Ingram Thompson, a member of a family that had been making salt during the 19th century, started the Lion Salt Works when in 1894 he built a salt pan in the coal yard of the Red Lion Hotel, in Marston, near Northwich, Cheshire.

=== Thompson family ===
Six generations of the Thompson family were involved with the salt industry, at the site of the Lion Salt Works. John Thompson Senior (1799–1867) was originally a joiner, timber merchant and brickyard owner with premises on Witton Street and London Road in Northwich He entered the salt trade in 1842 when he started a shipping and lighting business along the River Weaver to the ports in Liverpool and Birkenhead. Initially this was in partnership with other salt proprietors but by 1846 he had entered a partnership with his son John Thompson Junior (1824–1899), called Thompson and Son that operated until 1889. They also occupied a timber yard and dockyard buildings in Northwich Castle on the River Weaver. The dockyards were sold to cover debts to W. J. Yarwood's in 1887.

They began to sink salt mines and start salt works north-west of Northwich. Platt’s Hill Mine, Wincham, was sunk by John Thompson in 1843, and in 1846 was followed by the Dunkirk Works, in Witton-cum-Twambrooks. Several more salt works and mines followed over the next forty years in the districts of Witton, Marston and Wincham north-west of Northwich, and also in Winsford. After the death of John Thompson Senior in 1867, the business was split between John Thompson Junior and his brother Jabez Thompson. After initially running the Alliance Works in Marston (see below), Jabez Thompson went on to run the successful family terracotta and brickworks on London Road, Northwich. John Thompson Junior continued to run the salt business with his sons Henry Ingram (1851–1937) and Alfred Jabez (1857–1965). In 1888 the majority of the remainder of the business was sold to the Salt Union.

After the sale of the family business in 1888 John Thompson Junior retired to Eddisbury Hall in Macclesfield. His sons were soon involved with the salt business once more. Henry Ingram Thompson started the Lion Salt Works, Marston (see below) whilst Alfred Jabez Thompson became a rival and ran a salt works in Wincham. Both of Henry Ingram's sons, Jack (1875–1966) and Alan Kinsey (1883–1964) joined him to work at the Lion Salt Works and the shipping office in Liverpool. After his death in 1937, his sons ran the business as a partnership. Alan Kinsey's son, Henry Lloyd Thompson (1925–2013), joined the business in 1947 and Jack Thompson's grandson Jonathan joined the business in 1962. They ran the Lion Salt Works until its closure in 1986.

=== Alliance Salt Works ===
The Lion Salt Works was not the first salt works on site. In 1857 John Thompson Senior and John Thompson Junior obtained from John Buckley a 50-year lease for the Outlet Field in Marston where they constructed the Alliance Salt Works. They subsequently bought the site in 1868. In the 1870s the site was run by Jabez Thompson, brother of John Thompson Junior. By the 1880s it was run by Alfred Jabez Thompson, the son of John Thompson Junior. He sold the site to the Salt Union in 1888 for £17,000.

=== Lion Salt Works ===
The Lion Salt Works was built in 1894 when John Thompson Junior and Henry Ingram Thompson purchased the site of the Red Lion Hotel, adjacent to the bridge on the Ollershaw Lane in Marston. John Thompson Junior retired shortly afterward to Eddisbury Hall in Macclesfield. Henry Ingram Thompson sunk a brine shaft built a brine tank and engine house and built the first pan and stove house (number 1) on site around the Red Lion Hotel. By 1899 the Red Lion Hotel had been demolished and two cottages converted to the Red Lion Inn. This allowed them to build two further pan and stove houses (2 and 3). On-site there were also two butter pans and two fishery pans. A Manager's House and Smithy were built at the south-west of the site. By 1906 a mineral railway had been built that extended to the south of the site. Henry Ingram Thompson ran the site with his sons Jack Thompson and Alan Kinsey Thompson. The salt works exported salt to Canada, North America and West Africa. The domestic market saw salt sold to Cheshire, Manchester and Liverpool.

Between the first and the second world wars, the salt works saw little change. New markets were opened up with salt sold to Denmark for salting bacon. However, the advent of the Second World War meant these markets were disrupted. In 1937 Henry Ingram Thompson died. His sons Jack Thompson and Alan Kinsey Thompson ran the business. They dug a new brine borehole and pump.

Henry Lloyd Thompson joined the firm in 1947 after the Second World War. He had just finished his military service in the Royal Navy. He was to run the salt works for the next forty years. After demolishing the butter and fishery pans, he built two more pans and stove house (numbers 4 and 5) in 1954 and 1965. In the 1950s, 90% of the salt produced was exported to West Africa. It was exported via firms including Paterson Zochonis, John Holt and ICI to ports on the West African coast including Calabar, Lagos and Port Harcourt in Nigeria, Monrovia in Liberia, Conakry in Guinea, and Freetown, Sierra Leone. The West African market continued to be successful despite open-pan salt being more expensive because it produced a light, flaky grained salt known as 'Lagos Salt'. This was preferred in the West African market because it withstood the high temperatures and very high humidity of the tropics.

Henry Lloyd Thompson was joined by his second cousin Jonathan in the early 1960s. They sought to diversify and modernize the salt works. New techniques were introduced including an automated pan and converting the works to run on reclaimed oil. The Thompsons produced their own brand salt from the late 1960s in an attempt to create new markets. They eventually opened the Lion Salt Works as a working museum between 1980 and 1986.

During the 20th century, more efficient methods of extracting and refining salt were developed and by the late 1960s the works was the only business continuing to use the open pan process in the country. The business closed down in 1986 when the West African markets, the major purchaser of 'Lagos Salt', began to decline. This was as a result of the Biafran War in Nigeria (1967–1970), and a series of military juntas that followed. In addition competition from cheaper imports of solar evaporated salt from Brazil in exchange for oil also affected the market. Henry Lloyd and Jonathan Thompson eventually closed the Lion Salt Works in 1986.

== Preservation ==
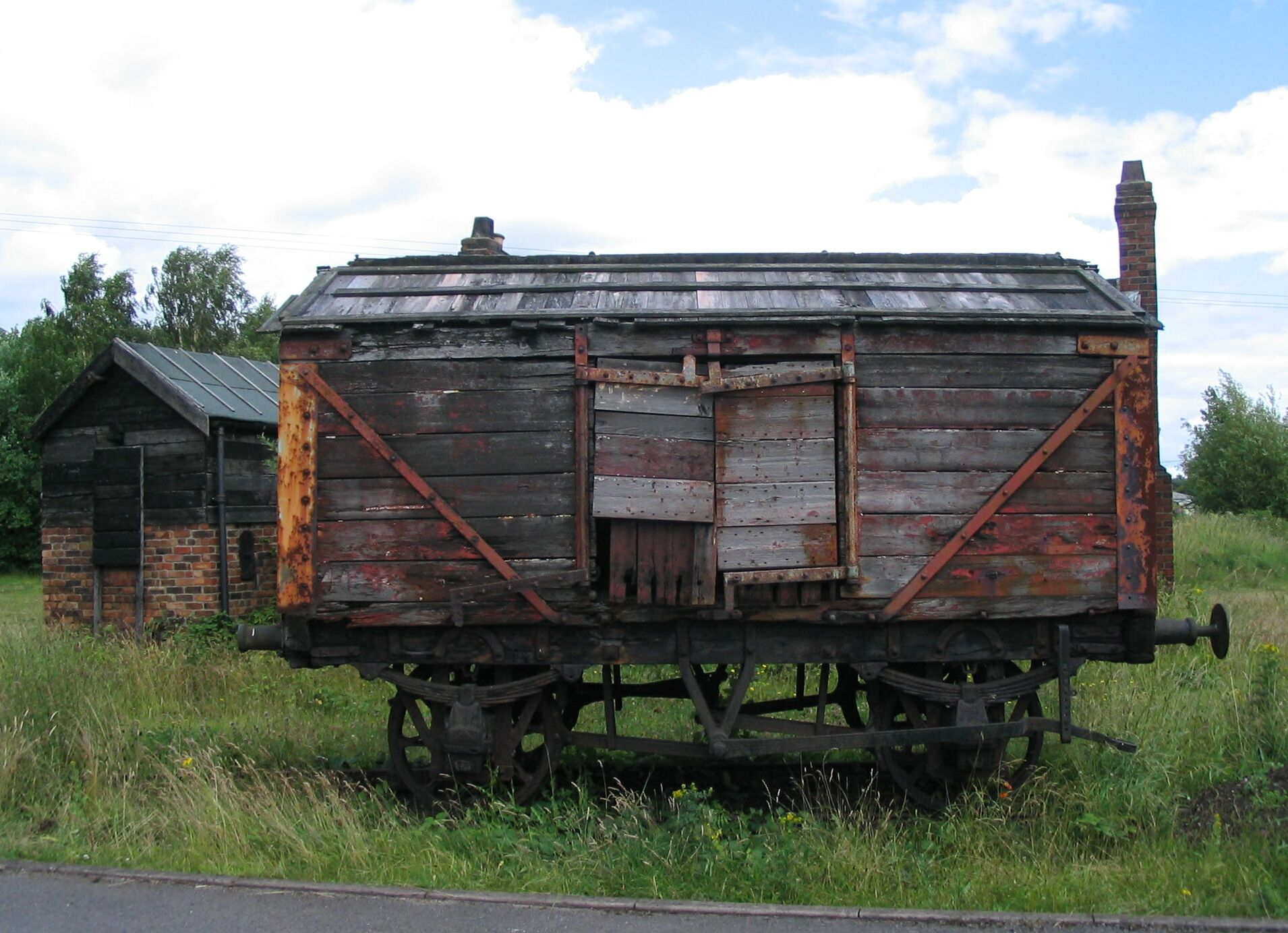
Salt Van

The buildings were purchased by Vale Royal District Council to prevent their demolition. In 1993, the Lion Salt Works Trust was formed as a registered charity and a company limited by guarantee. In 2000, a survey showed that the land around the works was stable and during the following years money was raised from DEFRA, English Heritage, Cheshire Rural Recovery and the Northwest Development Agency to enable surveys to be completed and a conservation plan to be written. In July 2005, an application was made to the Heritage Lottery Fund and a Stage 1 award was made the following March. In March 2008, it was announced that the Heritage Lottery Fund had made an award of £4.96 million towards the £7 million total cost of the restoration project.

In 2004, Lion Salt Works was a candidate on the BBC's Restoration programme. The surviving buildings are recorded in the National Heritage List for England as designated Grade II listed buildings. The specific buildings listed are the canal salt shed, the engine shed and pump house, the office in the works yard, and the pan sheds and stoves and the store shed behind the works. The buildings are registered as a Scheduled Ancient Monument. The site is recognised as an Anchor Point of the European Route of Industrial Heritage.

In 2009, the site came into the ownership of Cheshire West and Chester Council. It was reopened on 5 June 2015 after a major redevelopment project as a new heritage visitor attraction. The £10.2 million project was sponsored by the Heritage Lottery Fund, Cheshire West and Chester, Manage +, Historic England, WREN and Wates Foundation. The restoration won the AABC Conservation award at the 2016 Civic Trust Awards, and in August 2016 it was named the best UK Heritage Project by the National Lottery.

== Museum ==
The Lion Salt Works has been restored as a museum and visitor attraction. The museum and its restored buildings have galleries that illustrate how the salt works operated and salt's effect on the economy and landscape of mid-Cheshire. The restored salt-work buildings and structures include a rebuilt stove house with its associated salt pan in situ, the smithy, engine house, a brine tank and the rail tracks used for transporting salt on the site. There is a café, conference facility and play area.

== See also ==
- List of Scheduled Monuments in Cheshire (post-1539)
- Listed buildings in Marston, Cheshire
- History of salt
- Open pan salt making
- Salt in Cheshire
- History of salt in Middlewich
- Weaver Hall Museum and Workhouse, Northwich
- New Cheshire Salt Works, a vacuum salt works in nearby Wincham
