= Salt in Cheshire =

Location of Cheshire in England

Cheshire is a county in North West England. Rock salt was laid down in this region some 220 million years ago, during the Triassic period. Seawater moved inland from an open sea, creating a chain of shallow salt marshes across what is today the Cheshire Basin. As the marshes evaporated, deep deposits of rock salt were formed.

== History of salt workings in Cheshire ==
=== Northwich ===
A settlement, Condate, was built during Roman times at the current location of Northwich. It is believed that the Romans built this settlement due to the strategic river crossing of the Weaver and the presence of the brine springs. The Romans used lead salt pans to extract the salt from the brine. Salt pans and first-century brine kilns have both been found around the Roman fort.

The salt beds beneath Northwich were re-discovered in the 1670s by employees of the local Smith-Barry family. The family were actually looking for coal when they accidentally discovered rock salt in the grounds of their house, Marbury Hall, Marbury, north of Northwich with salt extraction starting shortly afterwards. Salt was also extracted in the area immediately north east of Northwich, including the villages of Marston (including the Lion Salt Works) and Wincham (including the New Cheshire Salt Works).

In the 19th century it became uneconomical to mine salt, and so solvent extraction using water as a solvent was used. Hot water was pumped through the mines that dissolved the salt and the resultant brine was pumped out and the salt extracted from the brine. This technique was known as wild brine pumping or natural brine pumping but weakened mines and led to land subsidence as mines collapsed. The collapse of a number of mines led to salt mining to move to Winsford.

There are two chief museums of the industry in the Northwich area, the most recent addition being the Lion Salt Works museum. The Salt Museum of Thomas Ward and John Brunner was founded in the 19th century and is now housed in the Weaver Hall Museum and Workhouse.

=== Middlewich ===
Following the Roman invasion, Middlewich was named Salinae on account of the salt deposits around it, as it was one of their major sites of salt production. During this time the Romans built a fort at Harbutts Field (SJ70216696), to the north of the town and recent (2000s) excavations to the south of the fort have found evidence of further Roman activity including a well and part of a preserved Roman road.

Salt manufacture has remained one of the principal employers in Middlewich for most of the past 2,000 years. Salt making is mentioned in the Domesday Book, and by the 13th century there were approximately 100 "wich houses" packed around the town's two brine pits. By 1908 there were nine industrial scale salt manufacturers in the town, with a number of open pan salt works close to the Trent and Mersey Canal.

=== Nantwich ===
The origins of the settlement at Nantwich date to Roman times when salt from Nantwich was used by the Roman garrisons at Chester and Stoke-on-Trent as both a preservative and a condiment. Salt has been used in the production of Cheshire cheese and in the tanning industry, both industries being products of the dairy industry based on the Cheshire Plain around Nantwich.

In the Domesday Book, Nantwich is recorded as having eight salt houses. The salt industry peaked in the late 16th century when there were 216 salt houses, but the industry ended in 1856 with the closure of the last salt house. Similarly the last tannery closed in 1974, but the clothing industry remains important to the area.

=== Winsford ===
From the 1830s, salt became important to Winsford, partly because the salt mines under Northwich had begun to collapse and another source of salt near the River Weaver was needed. A new source was discovered in Winsford, leading to the development of a salt industry along the course of the River Weaver, where many factories were established. By 1897, Winsford had become the largest producer of salt in Britain. As a result, a new town developed within a mile of the old Borough of Over which had been focused on Delamere Street. Most of the early development took place on the other side of the river, with new housing, shops, pubs, chapels and a new church being built in the former hamlet of Wharton. As the wind usually blew the smoke away from Over, it became the place for the wealthier inhabitants to live. However, people who worked on the barges and other people working in Winsford started to develop along the old Over Lane (now High Street). The old borough tried to remain separate but had been connected by the 1860s.

== Current salt manufacturing in Cheshire ==
The manufacture of white salt for food and allied industries is now concentrated in Middlewich. The manufacturer there, British Salt, sells under the name Saxa, and also through third parties e.g. supermarket own brands. Salt produced by British Salt in Middlewich has 57% of the UK market for salt used in cooking also baking in some cases.

The UK's largest rock salt (halite) mine is at Winsford. It is one of only three places where rock salt is commercially mined in the UK, the others being at Boulby Mine, North Yorkshire and Kilroot near Carrickfergus, Northern Ireland.

Rock salt extraction began at Winsford in the 17th century. Initially it was used only as salt licks for animals, and to strengthen weak brine. In 1844 Winsford Rock Salt Mine was opened, and is claimed by its operator, Salt Union Ltd., to be "Britain's oldest working mine".

== See also ==
- History of salt
- History of salt in Middlewich
- Lion Salt Works
- Weaver Hall Museum and Workhouse, Northwich
- Open pan salt making
- Cheshire Brine Subsidence Compensation Board
