= New Cheshire Salt Works =

Former manufacturing company in the UK

- Company type: Private limited company
- Industry: Salt manufacturing
- Founded: 1923; 103 years ago
- Defunct: 2006
- Fate: Acquired
- Headquarters: Wincham, Cheshire, United Kingdom
- Products: White or brine salt

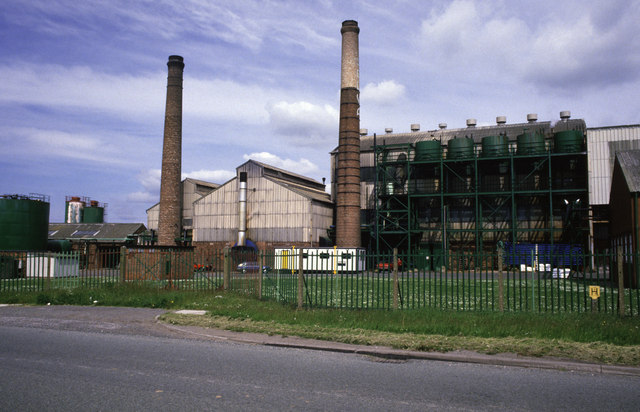
New Cheshire Salt Works in 1986

The New Cheshire Salt Works Ltd was a salt manufacturer formerly located in Wincham, north east of Northwich in Cheshire, UK. Run by the Stubbs family until its acquisition by British Salt, it operated between around 1923 and 2006. The company itself continues to exist as a subsidiary of British Salt. It produced white or brine salt from naturally occurring underground brine using natural or wild pumping. The salt was extracted by vacuum evaporation and was of a high quality. It was used for human consumption under the brandname "Selva" and in the pharmaceutical industry; New Cheshire was the only British company to supply salt for pharmaceutical use.

In its later years, New Cheshire was the biggest of the few remaining family-owned salt producers. From the mid-1980s until its closure, it was the only salt works in the UK still to use the natural brine pumping method.

== Early history of salt extraction in Wincham and the Northwich area ==
After a rock salt bed was discovered north of Northwich in 1670, Northwich swiftly overtook Nantwich and Middlewich to become the largest salt producer in Cheshire. Mining began in the village of Marston in 1781, a few years after the opening of the North Staffordshire (later Trent and Mersey) Canal, which was used to transport the salt. In the 1850s salt works were established in Marston, and in the 1860s and 1870s in the adjacent village of Wincham, predominantly following the line of the canal. The Salt Branches Railway connected Wincham to Northwich from 1867. By the late 19th century, Wincham was a flourishing salt-manufacturing location, with several open-pan salt works as well as rock salt mines. Many of the salt works in Wincham were short lived, but some amalgamated to form Wincham Salt Works, which was located on the site of the New Cheshire Works in 1877. It was sold to the Salt Union in 1888, and demolished shortly afterwards.

== New Cheshire Salt Works ==
The Stubbs family had a history in the Cheshire salt business dating back to the early 18th century, and had owned salt works near Northwich in the 19th century. New Cheshire Salt Works was founded in 1891, and purchased by Alfred Stubbs and other members of the Stubbs family in 1923 when New Cheshire Salt Works Ltd was incorporated. It remained in that family for five generations. The factory was in Wincham at SJ676754, to the north east of the Trent and Mersey Canal. It had two chimneys in red brick, one marked with their brand "Selva" in capitals. By 1982, New Cheshire was the only salt works remaining in Wincham, the nearby open-pan Sunbeam Salt Works having closed in the early 1970s.

Naturally occurring underground brine from the Wincham brinefield was pumped to the surface via a borehole. Such natural or wild brine pumping differs from controlled brine pumping, where water is pumped underground into rock to dissolve rock salt deposits. The process has historically been associated with subsidence, which has been a major problem in the Northwich area. The brine was purified by treatment with sodium carbonate and lime, and the salt extracted using a closed-pan partial vacuum evaporation method. The technique was adapted from the sugar industry, and had first been applied to salt extraction in 1887 in Silver Springs, New York. First tried commercially in the UK as early as 1901, several British manufacturers started up vacuum evaporator plants using a small Mirlees-type evaporator in parallel with their open-pan operations after the First World War. James Stubbs had learned about the method of vacuum evaporation in Michigan in 1905, and the New Cheshire Works was one of the early companies to adopt the vacuum evaporation method, importing an evaporator in the 1930s. Described as "magnificent" by journalist Mark Kurlansky, the company's first evaporator had three chambers; it had an Art Deco design, and was decorated with stripes in dark and pale wood, with brass fittings. The company updated the evaporator in the 1950s and the 1990s. In the 2000s, the works was using a small Svenson system with three evaporator chambers (termed "effects").

During the 1960s, most of the smaller vacuum plants closed and two companies, Staveley Industries and Cerebos, merged to form British Salt. By the 1970s, there were only three companies using the technology, ICI, British Salt and the much smaller New Cheshire Works, which used its small evaporator to produce a relatively low volume of a high-purity product that was not economic at the two large works. The use of natural pumping declined after the Second World War, and mostly ceased during the 1970s, but New Cheshire continued to use the process. From the mid-1980s until its closure in 2006, it was the only salt works in the UK to use the natural brine pumping method. New Cheshire was the third-largest salt producer in the UK in 1986, after ICI and British Salt. At that date, the annual salt output exceeded 50,000 tons, of which a quarter was sold to consumers under the brandname "Selva".

The vacuum process used at New Cheshire was more expensive than that used by other British manufacturers, as well as European manufacturers exporting to the UK. The process produced pure vacuum-dried salt with less than 0.1% water content, which is suitable for use in human food, as well as a variety of other purposes including animal food, such as salt licks, water softening tablets, dyes and textile production, such as leather preparation. New Cheshire Salt Works was the only company in the UK to produce a very pure product with less than 0.01% water content for use in the pharmaceutical industry. This required the plant to be shut down and cleaned, as well as further drying of the pure vacuum-dried salt with hot-air driers.

In 2005, the works could produce up to 80,000 tonnes a year, and was operating at close to capacity; the total annual white salt production in the UK was estimated at a million tonnes. New Cheshire was then one of the last three commercial salt producers in the UK. The company was sold that year to British Salt, in an acquisition that was investigated by the Competition Commission in May but allowed to go ahead on 8 November 2005. Although the works had been profitable in 2003 and 2004, the Commission ruled that it would soon be rendered uneconomic by a number of factors, particularly increased energy prices. British Salt announced the closure of the Wincham works a few weeks later, and it closed in June 2006. At the time of closure it employed 60 people. The works site, an area of 198 acres, was purchased by a development company early in 2007, and the site has since been demolished and redeveloped. Some of the company's records are archived by Cheshire Archives and Local Studies.

== See also ==
- Salt in Cheshire
- Lion Salt Works, in the nearby village of Marston
