= Condate =

Condate may refer to:

- Condate (moth), a genus of moth

== Places ==
- Chapeauroux, a river of France
- Condé-sur-Iton, a commune in the Eure department, France
- Cosne-Cours-sur-Loire, a commune in the Nièvre, France
- Merpins, a commune in the Charente department, France
- Montereau-Fault-Yonne, commune in the Seine-et-Marne department, France
- Condate (Britain), Roman Northwich, in Cheshire, England
- Rennes, a city in Brittany, France
- Condate, suburb of Roman Lugdunum

== See also ==
- fr:Condate, a more extensive list in French Wikipedia
