= History of salt =

Role in human culture

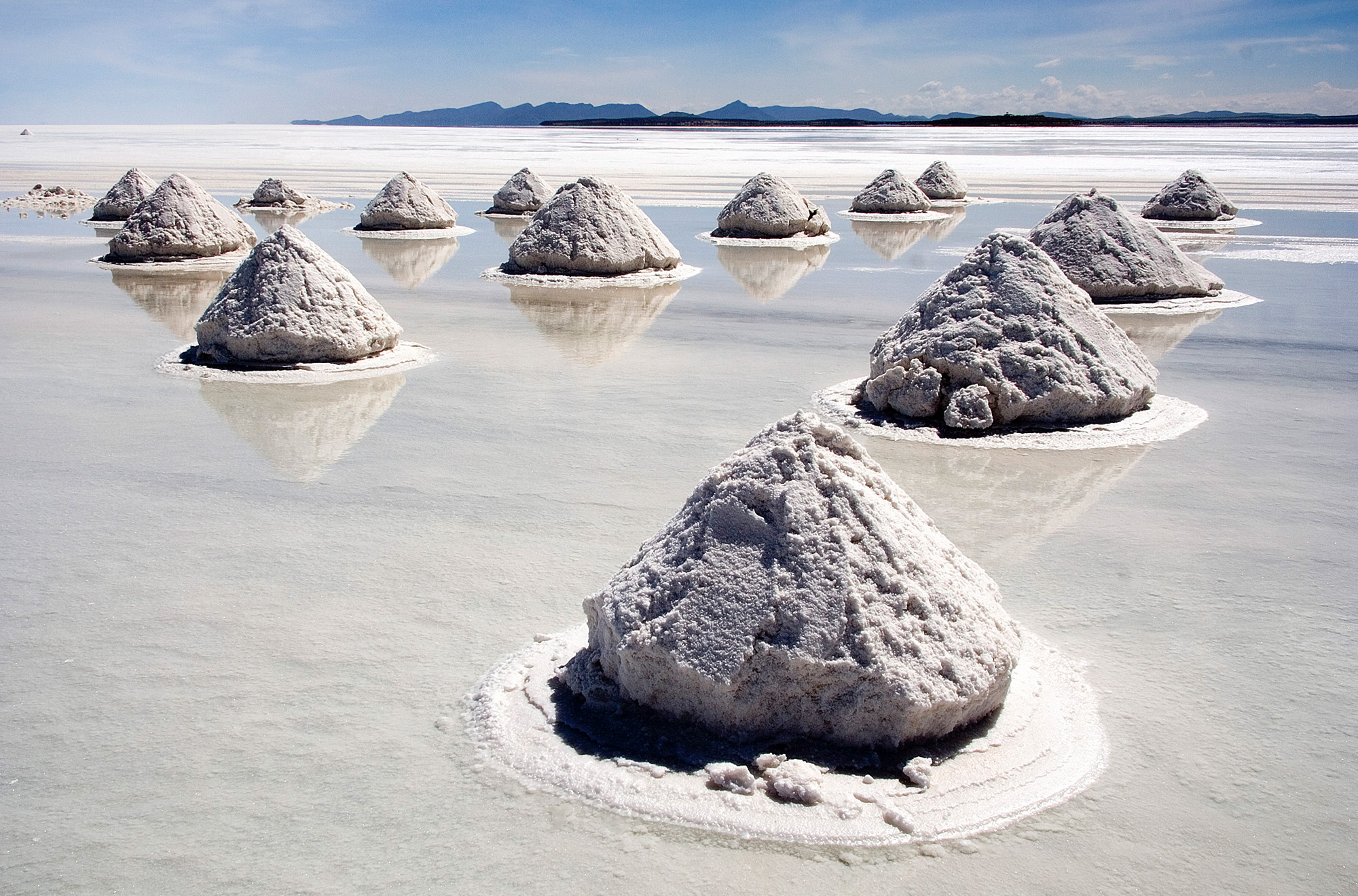
Collected salt mounds

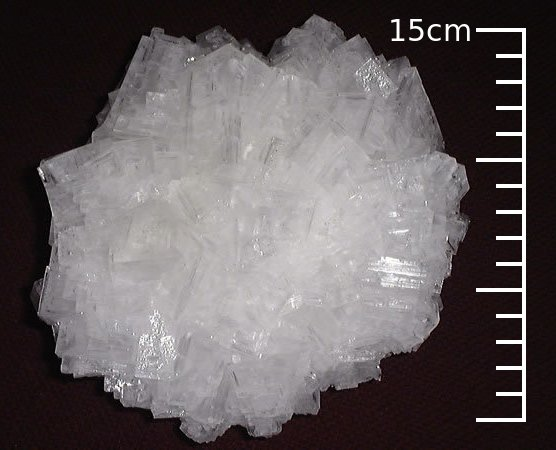
Naturally formed salt crystals

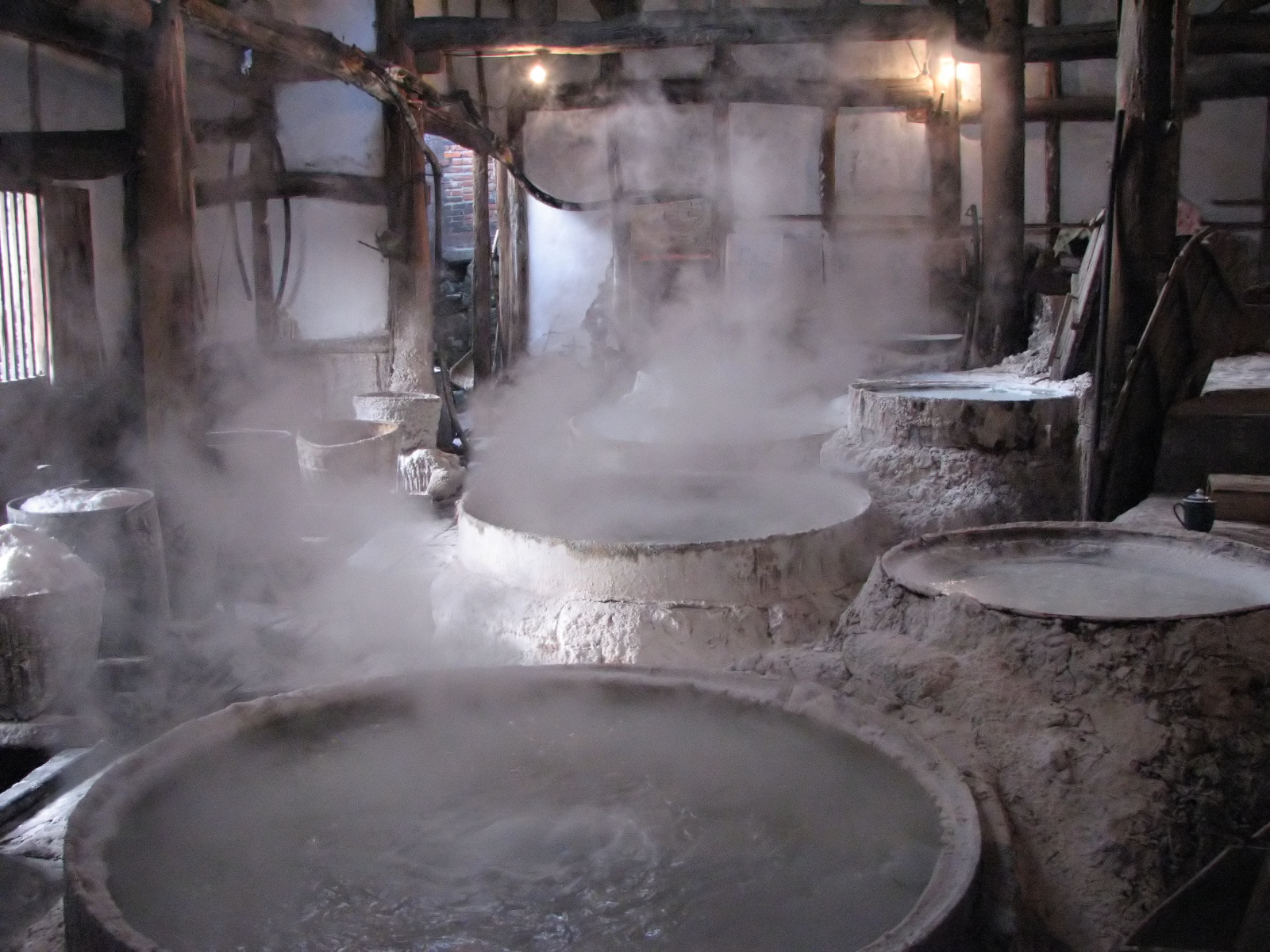
Ancient method of boiling brine into pure salt in China

Common salt, also referred to as table salt or by its chemical formula NaCl (sodium chloride), is an ionic compound of sodium and chloride ions. All life depends on its chemical properties to survive. Humans have used it in food for thousands of years, for food preservation and seasoning. Salt's ability to preserve food was a founding contributor to the development of civilization. It helped eliminate dependence on seasonal availability of food, and made it possible to transport food over large distances. However, salt was often difficult to obtain, so it was a highly valued trade item, and used as currency by some societies. Many salt roads, such as the Via Salaria in Italy, had been established by the Bronze Age.

Throughout history, the availability of salt has been pivotal to civilization. Today, salt is widely accessible, inexpensive, and often iodized.

== Sources ==
Salt comes from two main sources: sea water, and the mineral halite or rock salt. Rock salt occurs in vast beds of sedimentary evaporite minerals that result from the drying up of enclosed lakes, playas, and seas. Salt beds may be up to 350 metres (1,150 ft) thick and underlie broad areas.

In the United States and Canada, extensive underground beds extend from the Appalachian basin of western New York through parts of Ontario and under much of the Michigan basin. Other deposits are in Texas, Ohio, Kansas, New Mexico, Nova Scotia, and Saskatchewan. In the United Kingdom, underground beds are found in Cheshire and around Droitwich. In Portugal, there are brine springs at the Salinas Naturais de Rio Maior.

On seacoasts, salt is often made in salt evaporation ponds or salterns.

Many placenames refer to salt production: Salzburg, Austria 'city of salt'; Tuzla, Bosnia and Herzegovina, 'salt mine' in Turkish, previously called Salines (Roman and Greek: Σαλήνες), Soli 'salts' (Bosnian), Só 'salt' (Hungarian); other places in the former Ottoman Empire named Tuzla; various places names Salins in France and Switzerland; Solotvyno, Ukraine (Солотвино 'salt town'); Salihorsk, Belarus (Салігорск); Slaný, Czechia; Solnitsata, Bulgaria (Солницата 'saltworks'). In Britain, the suffix "-wich" in a place name sometimes means it was a source of salt, as in Northwich and Droitwich. Hall in German refers to salt: Halle an der Saale, Schwäbisch Hall, Bad Reichenhall. In China, there is Yancheng 'salt city'.

High-quality rock salt was cut in medieval Transylvania, Maramureş, and southern Poland (Wieliczka).

Salt is extracted from underground beds either by mining, or by solution mining using water to dissolve the salt. In solution mining, the salt reaches the surface as brine, from which the water is evaporated, leaving salt crystals. There are also natural brine springs.

== History ==
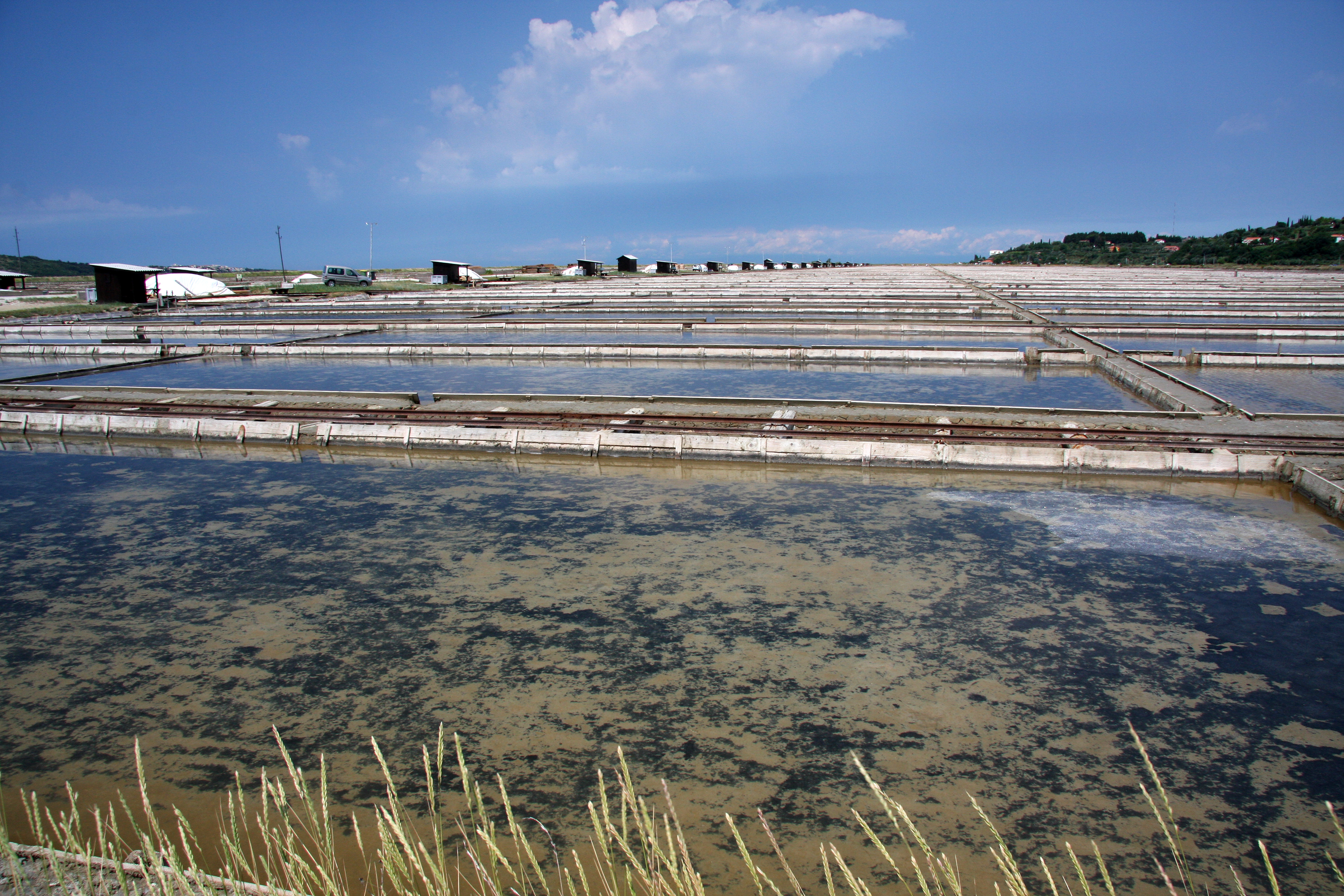
The Sečovlje Saltworks on the Northern Adriatic Sea were probably started in Antiquity and were first mentioned in 804 in the document on Placitum of Riziano.

=== Ancient world ===
Early Neolithic salt production, dating to approximately 6,000 BCE, has been identified at an excavation at Poiana Slatinei in Lunca, Romania.

Solnitsata, the earliest known town in Europe, was built around a salt production facility. Located in present-day Bulgaria, the town is thought by archaeologists to have accumulated wealth by supplying salt throughout the Balkans.

Salt was of high value to the Greeks, Tamils, Chinese, Hittites and other peoples of antiquity. In ancient Jewish literature, the Book of Job refers to salt as an important spice, while the Book of Sirach ranks it among "the elements necessary for man's life." In the early years of the Roman Republic, with the growth of the city of Rome, roads were built to make transportation of salt to the capital city easier. An example was the Via Salaria (originally a Sabine trail), leading from Rome to the Adriatic Sea. The Adriatic, having a higher salinity due to its shallow depth, had more productive solar ponds than the Tyrrhenian Sea, much closer to Rome.

The word "salary" comes from the Latin word for salt. The persistent modern claim that the Roman Legions were sometimes paid in salt is baseless; a salārium may have been an allowance paid to Roman soldiers for the purchase of salt, but even that is not well established.

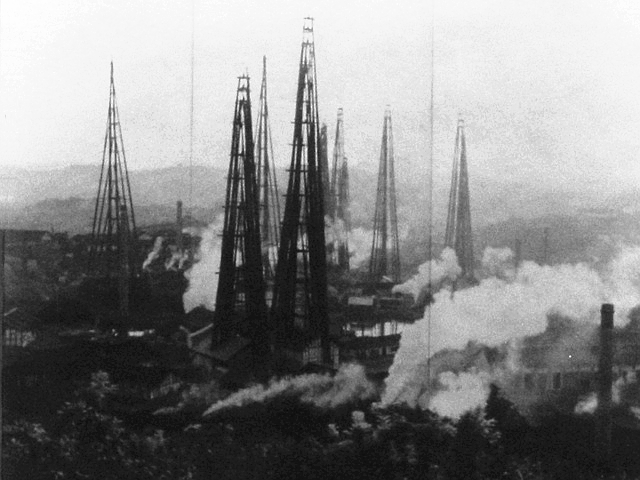
Vertical derricks and drilling rig from Qing dynasty Zigong, China, extracting brine from deep underground wells

During the late Roman Empire and throughout the Middle Ages salt was a precious commodity carried along the salt roads into the heartland of the Germanic tribes. Caravans consisting of as many as forty thousand camels traversed four hundred miles of the Sahara bearing salt to inland markets in the Sahel, sometimes trading salt for slaves: Timbuktu was a noted salt and slave market.

Salt in Chinese history was both a driver of technological development and a stable source of revenue for the imperial government.

In Ethiopia, since during and likely before the Axumite period and until the 20th century, blocks of salt called amoleh were carved from the salt pans of the Afar Depression, especially around Lake Afrera, then carried by camel west to Atsbi and Ficho in the Ethiopian Highlands, whence traders distributed them throughout the rest of Ethiopia, as far south as the Kingdom of Kaffa. These salt blocks served as a form of currency.

Polynesians settling the Hawaiian Islands independently developed ways of extracting dry salt (paʻakai, lit. "seawater solid") from pans (loʻi paʻakai) which they use not just as a separate condiment of food (compared to those back in tropical island chains further south that directly condiment their food with miti) but also to preserve recently caught fish. These native salt industries flourished in Āliamanu/Āliapaʻakai and Kawaihae in Hawaiʻi, as well as Hanapēpē in Kauaʻi; only those in Hanapēpē remain to this day.

=== Cities and wars ===
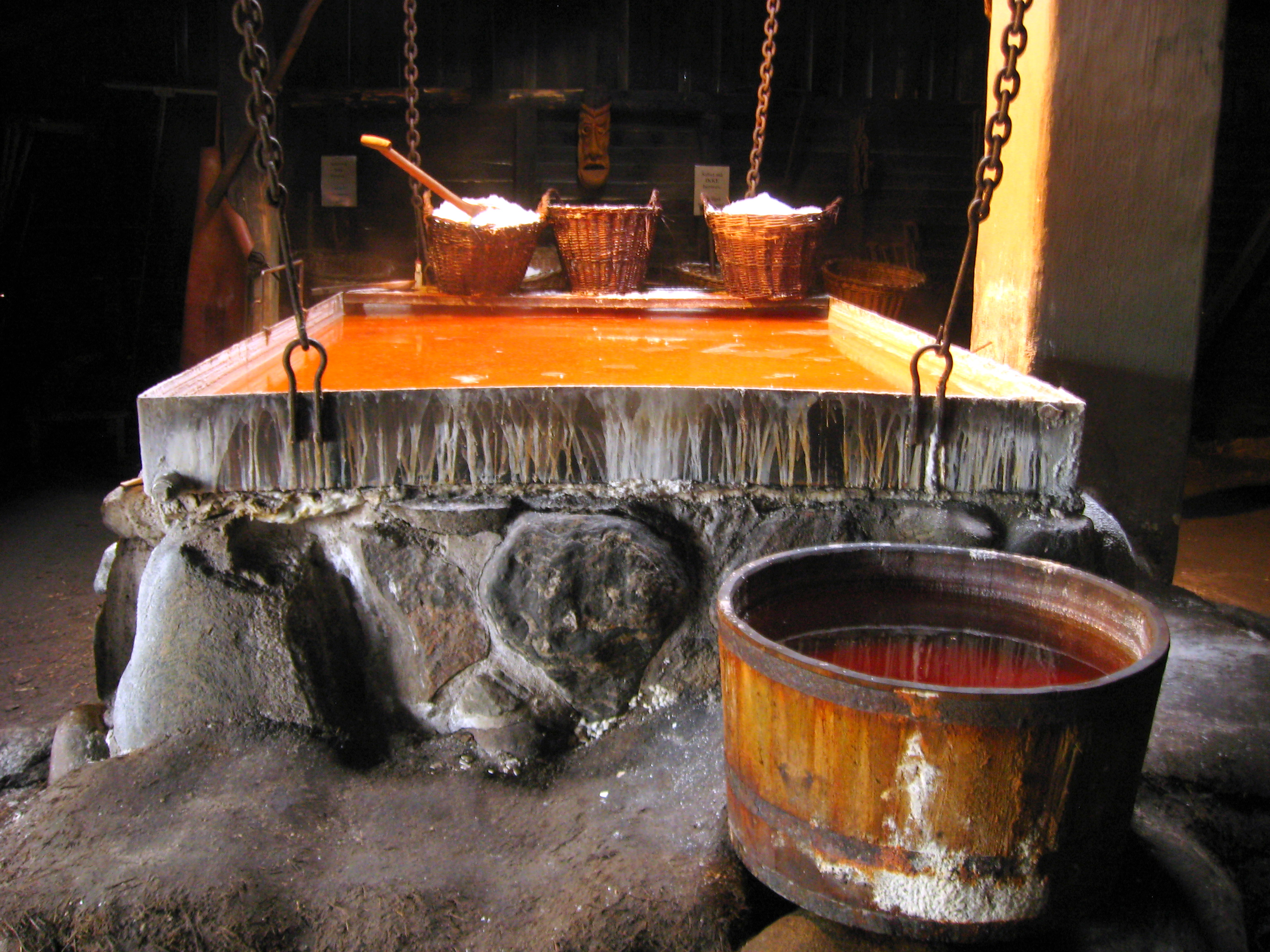
Salt production on Læsø, Denmark (reconstruction)

Salt has played a prominent role in determining the power and location of the world's great cities. Liverpool rose from just a small English port to become the prime exporting port for the salt dug in the great Cheshire salt mines and thus became the entrepôt for much of the world's salt in the 19th century.

The salt contributed to the cities' and even entire countries' wealth. One of the best examples is Poland and its Salt Mines in Wieliczka and Bochnia. During times of prosperity the mines controlled by the enterprise of Cracow Saltmines supplied up to 1/3 of the income to the treasury. Salt was extracted from the 13th century and continued until 1964. In 1996 the exploitation was ceased entirely.

Cities, states and duchies along the salt roads exacted heavy duties and taxes for the salt passing through their territories. This practice even caused the formation of cities, such as the city of Munich in 1158, when the then Duke of Bavaria, Henry the Lion, decided that the bishops of Freising no longer needed their salt revenue.

The gabelle—a hated French salt tax—was enacted in 1286. From its inception, the application of the gabelle in France varied significantly depending on the region. The provinces subjected to the grande gabelle had to pay for salt at an official price and were also required to purchase a fixed amount annually, while in other areas, no taxes were paid at all. As a result, in the 18th century, the price of salt in Paris was 20 times higher than its price in Brittany, encouraging smuggling between regions. This tax was particularly despised due to both the regional differences in its application and the disproportion between the value of the product, which in many places could be obtained almost for free, and the amount demanded for it. The injustice of the gabelle was one of the reasons for the French Revolution. Logically, one of the first economic measures taken was the abolition of the gabelle. In 1806, Napoleon reinstated the monopoly, but applied it uniformly across all of France. Additionally, tax categories were established based on the intended use of the salt, so that the salt used for food paid a higher rate than that used for livestock or industry. The special tax on salt was definitively abolished in France in 1945.

In American history, salt has been a major factor in outcomes of wars. In the Revolutionary War, Loyalists intercepted Patriot salt shipments in an attempt to interfere with their ability to preserve food. Before Lewis and Clark set out for the Louisiana Territory, President Jefferson in his address to Congress mentioned a mountain of salt, 180 miles long and 45 wide, supposed to lie near the Missouri River, which would have been of inconceivable value, as a reason for their expedition.

During the Indian independence movement, Mahatma Gandhi organized the Salt Satyagraha protest to demonstrate against the British salt tax.

==== Salt production in England ====
Evidence of Early Neolithic salt pans, dating to 3766–3647 BCE, has been unearthed in Yorkshire. Evidence of Bronze Age production, c. 1400 BCE, has been identified in Somerset, Iron Age production in Hampshire, and Roman rock salt production in Cheshire. Salt was produced from both mines and sea in Medieval England. The open-pan salt making method was used along the Lincolnshire coast and in the salt marshes of Bitterne Manor on the banks of the River Itchen in Hampshire, where salt production was a notable industry.

Wich and wych are names associated (but not exclusively) with brine springs or wells in England. Originally derived from the Latin vicus, meaning "place", by the 11th century use of the 'wich' suffix in place names was associated with places with a specialised function including that of salt production. Several English places carry the suffix and are historically related to salt, including the four Cheshire 'wiches' of Middlewich, Nantwich, Northwich and Leftwich (a small village south of Northwich), and Droitwich in Worcestershire. Middlewich, Nantwich, Northwich and Droitwich are known as the "Domesday Wiches" due to their mention in the Domesday Book of 1086, "an indication of the significance of the salt-working towns in the economy of the region, and indeed of the country". Salt was very important to Europe because it was hard to trade with Africa and they needed to produce it themselves.

=== Salt trade ===
Monopolies over salt production and trade were essential aspects of government revenue in imperial China and retained its significance until 20th century.

During modern times, it became more profitable to sell salted food than pure salt. Thus sources of food to salt went hand in hand with salt making. The British controlled saltworks in the Bahamas as well as North American cod fisheries.

The search for oil in the late 19th and early 20th centuries used the technology and methods pioneered by salt miners, even to the degree that they looked for oil where salt domes were located.

== Salt production ==
On an industrial scale, salt is produced in one of two principal ways: the evaporation of salt water (brine) or mining. Evaporation can be by solar evaporation or using some heating device.

=== Solar evaporation of seawater ===
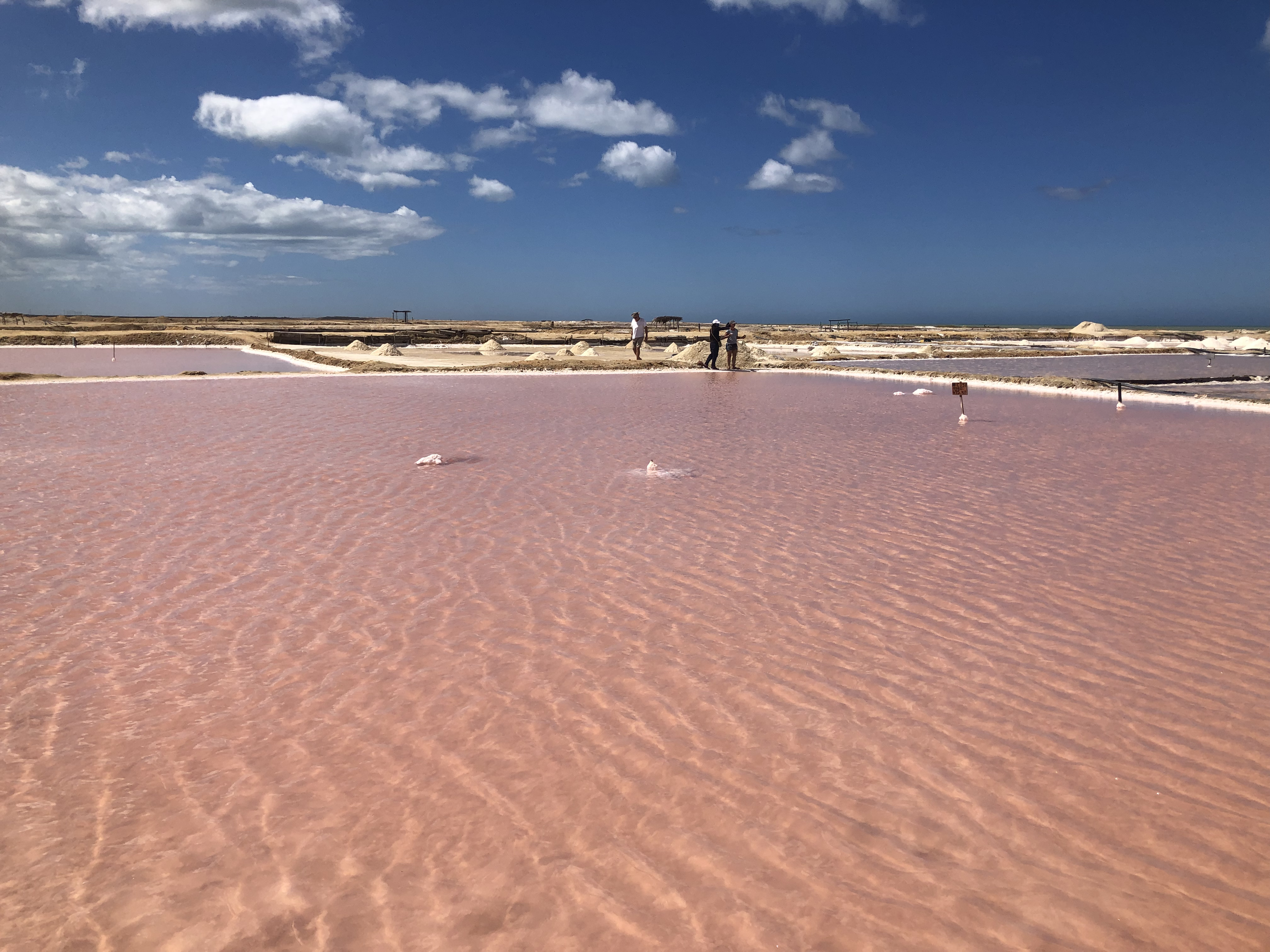
Salt evaporation pond in Manaure, La Guajira, Colombia

In regions where the climate is conducive—specifically where the ratio of evaporation to rainfall is sufficiently high—solar evaporation of seawater is an effective method for producing salt. This process takes advantage of the natural power of the sun to evaporate water, leaving behind concentrated brine that eventually crystallizes into salt. The system involves a series of interconnected evaporation ponds. As seawater moves through these ponds, it becomes progressively more concentrated due to the loss of water through evaporation. By the time the brine reaches the final pond, it has reached a saturation point where salt begins to crystallize and settle on the floor of the pond.

This method is particularly appealing because it relies on renewable energy, making it an environmentally friendly and cost-effective way to harvest salt. Many of the world’s largest salt production facilities utilize solar evaporation as their primary method of salt extraction.

One of the most notable examples is the Guerrero Negro saltworks, located in the Ojo de Liebre coastal lagoon in Mulejé, Baja California, Mexico. This saltworks is recognized as the largest in the world in both size and production capacity, producing millions of tons of salt annually. It serves as a model of industrial-scale solar evaporation and plays a significant role in the global salt market.

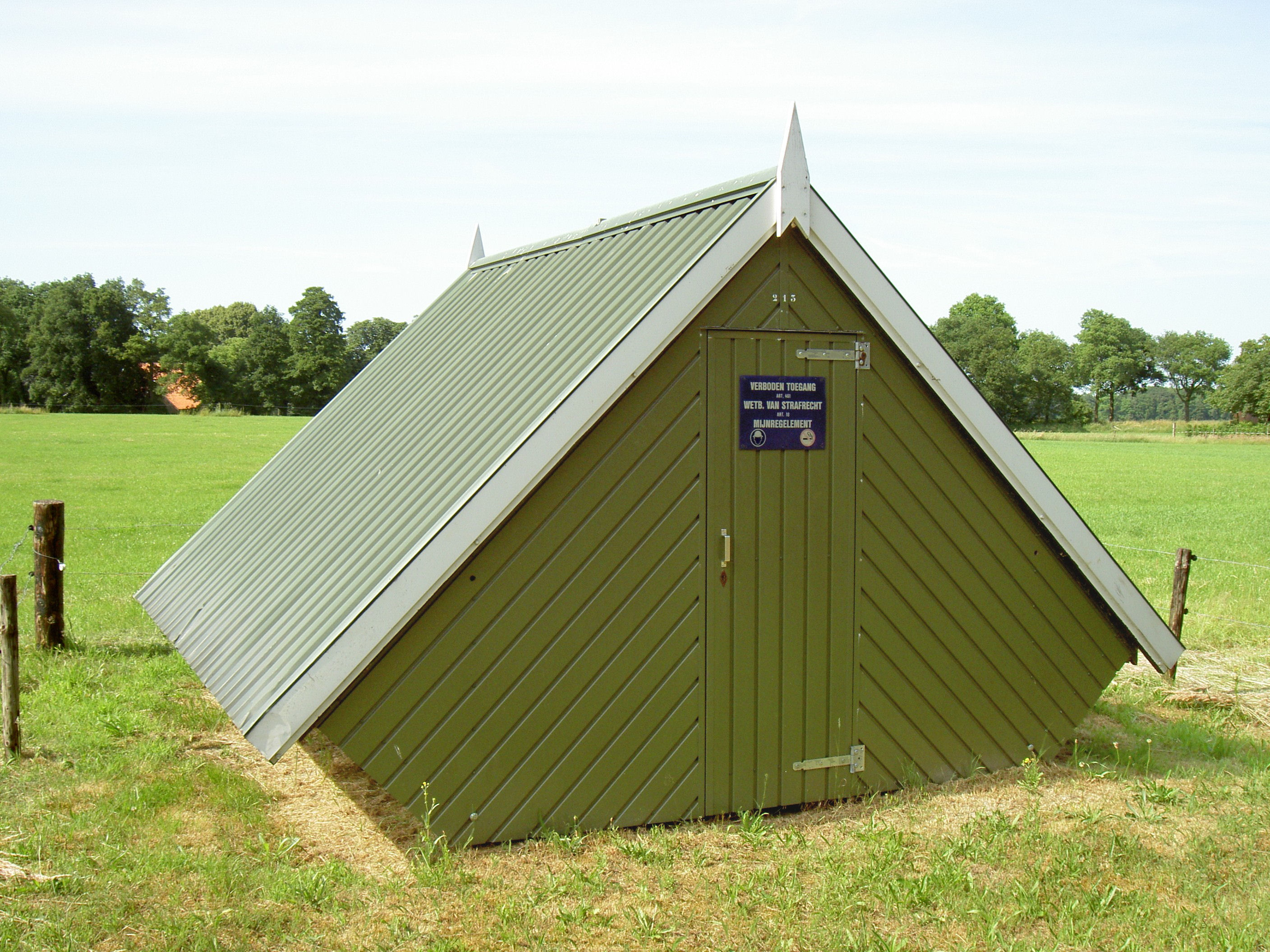
A 'zouthuisje', i.e. little salt-house, used for salt making today. Many of these structures can be found near Twekkelo in Twente, the Netherlands.

Other major salt-producing regions employing similar methods include the coastal areas of Australia and the Mediterranean coasts of France and Spain. These locations share the necessary climatic conditions, such as abundant sunshine, minimal rainfall, and consistent wind patterns, which facilitate efficient evaporation. The salt produced in these regions is used for a wide range of purposes, from culinary and industrial applications to de-icing roads in colder climates.

This traditional method of salt production remains in use within the global salt industry, incorporating modern technology alongside established techniques.

=== Open pan production from brine ===
One of the traditional methods of salt production in more temperate climates is using open pans. In open-pan production, salt brine is heated in large, shallow open pans. The earliest examples of this date back to prehistoric times and the pans were made of either a type of ceramic called briquetage, or lead. Later examples were made from iron. This change coincided with a change from wood to coal for the purpose of heating the brine. Brine would be pumped into the pans and concentrated by the heat of the fire burning underneath. As crystals of salt formed, these would be raked out and more brine added.

=== Closed pan production under vacuum ===
The open pan salt works has effectively been replaced with a closed pan system where the brine solution is evaporated under a partial vacuum.

=== Salt mines ===
In the second half of the 19th century, industrial mining and new drilling techniques made the discovery of more and deeper deposits possible, increasing mine salt's share of the market. Although mining salt was generally more expensive than extracting it from brine via solar evaporation of seawater, the introduction of this new source reduced the price of salt due to a reduction of monopolization. Extraction of salt from brine is still heavily used; for example, vacuum salt produced by British Salt in Middlewich has 57% of the UK market for salt used in cooking.

=== Salt wells ===
Salt is extracted from underground deposits by pumping water into deposits to dissolve the salt, resulting in a concentrated brine. The brine is then pumped to the surface, where the water is evaporated, leaving behind the purified salt crystals.

=== Salt from ashes ===
In traditional salt production in the Visayas Islands of the Philippines, salt is made from coconut husks, driftwood, or other plant matter soaked in seawater for at least several months. These are burned into ash then seawater is run through the ashes on a filter. The resulting brine is then evaporated in containers. Coconut milk is sometimes added to the brine before evaporation. The practice is endangered due to competition with cheap industrially-produced commercial salt. Only two traditions survive to the present day: asín tibuok and túltul (or dúkdok).

== Other salt uses ==
The earliest systematic exposition of the different kinds of salts, its uses, and the methods of its extraction was published in China around 2700 BCE. Hippocrates encouraged his fellow healers to use salt water to heal various ailments by immersing their patients in sea water. The ancient Greeks continued this, and in 1753, English author and physician Richard Russell published The Uses of Sea Water in which he declared that salt was a "common defence against the corruption of…bodies" and "contribut[es] greatly to all cures".

== See also ==
- Alberger process
- Bath salts
- Cerro de la Sal (Salt Mountain), Peru
- Fish sauce
- Garum
- Illinois Salines
- International Salt Co. v. United States
- Iodised salt
- James Ford (pirate)
- Joy Morton
- John Crenshaw
- Lüneburg Saltworks
- Mineral lick (salt lick)
- Morton Salt
- Red hill (salt making)
- Saltern
- Salt evaporation pond
- Salt in Cheshire
- Salt industry in Ghana
- Salt in the American Civil War
- Salt March (India)
- Salt Riot (Moscow uprising of 1648)
- Seawater greenhouse
- Anikey Stroganov (Solvychegodsk and Perm salterns)
- Sülze Saltworks
