= Wincham =

Village and civil parish in Cheshire, England

Coordinates: 53.283333°N 2.466667°W

- Pick Mere, Wincham

- Location within Cheshire
- Population: 2,162 (2011 Census)
- OS grid reference: SJ688763
- Civil parish: Wincham
- Unitary authority: Cheshire West and Chester
- Ceremonial county: Cheshire
- Region: North West
- Country: England
- Sovereign state: United Kingdom
- Post town: NORTHWICH
- Postcode district: CW9
- Dialling code: 01565
- Police: Cheshire
- Fire: Cheshire
- Ambulance: North West
- UK Parliament: Tatton

Wincham is a village and civil parish in the unitary authority of Cheshire West and Chester and the ceremonial county of Cheshire, England. It is located about 3 miles (4.8 km) north of Northwich in the Cheshire Plain. The Trent and Mersey Canal runs through the parish.

== History ==
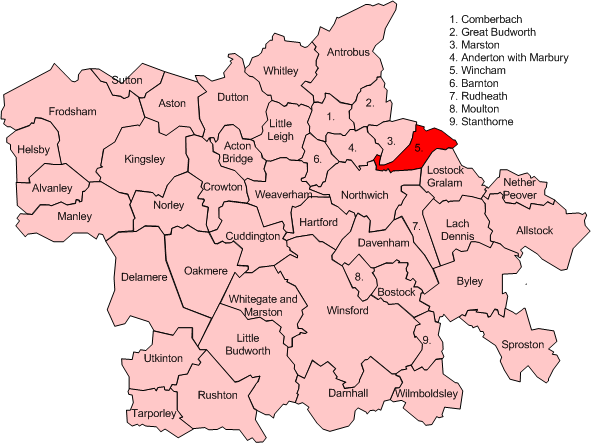
Map of civil parish of Wincham in the former borough of Vale Royal

The whole area around Wincham was the site of salt mining for many years, with the Lion Salt Works at nearby Marston. This industry finally ceased in the village in 2005 when New Cheshire Salt Works was bought by British Salt and closed down the following year. In 2015 the Lion Salt Works re-opened to provide a museum on the history of salt production in Cheshire. A butterfly garden in the grounds is managed by Butterfly Conservation.

The population history of the parish is:

- 1801: 367
- 1851: 684
- 1901: 1,054
- 1951: 890
- 2001: 2,289
- 2015: 3,045

== Amenities ==
The village is home to Wincham Community Primary School.

Witton Albion Football Club is located here; it moved to Wincham Park in 1989.

== Transport ==
Local bus services are operated by D&G Bus and Warrington's Own Buses. Routes connect the village with Northwich, Knutsford, Lostock Gralam and Warrington.

The nearest National Rail services can be accessed from Northwich and Lostock Gralam railway stations, which are stops on the Mid-Cheshire Line. Northern Trains operate generally hourly stopping services in both directions between Manchester Piccadilly, Stockport and Chester; on Sundays, the service reduces to two-hourly.

== See also ==
- Listed buildings in Wincham
