= Tuzla (disambiguation) =

Tuzla is a city in Bosnia and Herzegovina, the seat of Tuzla Canton.

Tuzla is a word of Turkish origin that means "salt pan" or "salt evaporation pond". It may also refer to:

== Locations ==
- Tuzla, Constanța, commune in Romania
- Enkomi or Tuzla, a village near Famagusta (Gazimağusa) in Cyprus
- Turkey:
  - Tuzla, Ayvacık, village, Turkey
  - Tuzla, a community in Adana Province of Turkey
  - Tuzla, Istanbul, district in Turkey
  - Tuzla, Kemah, village in Turkey
- Crimea, Strait of Kerch:
  - Cape Tuzla
  - Tuzla Island
  - Tuzla Spit
- Tuzla Gölü:
  - Lake Tuzla, Turkey
  - Crimean Tatar name of Stare Lake, Crimea, Ukraine
  - An alternative name for Kâmil Abduş Lake, Istanbul

== Ships ==
- MS Tuzla, now called MS Lodbrog, a Romanian ship
- MV Tuzla, a Turkish ship
