= History of salt in Middlewich =

Middlewich, a town in northwest England, lies on the confluence of three rivers – the Dane, the Croco and the Wheelock. Most importantly for the history of salt making, it also lies on the site of a prehistoric brine spring.

Following the Roman invasion, Middlewich was named Salinae on account of the salt deposits around it, as it was one of their major sites of salt production. During this time the Romans built a fort at Harbutts Field (SJ70216696), to the north of the town. Recent excavations to the south of the fort have found evidence of further Roman activity including a well and part of a preserved Roman road.

Salt manufacture has remained the principal industry for the past 2,000 years. Salt making is mentioned in the Domesday Book, and by the 13th century there were approximately 100 "wich houses" packed around the town's two brine pits. By 1908 there were nine industrial scale salt manufacturers in the town, with a number of open pan salt works close to the canal, however salt manufacture in Middlewich is now concentrated in one manufacturer, British Salt. The salt is sold as the Saxa brand by RHM, and by others e.g. supermarket own brands. Salt produced by British Salt in Middlewich has 57% of the UK market for salt used in cooking.

== Historical extracts concerning salt production in Middlewich ==
=== Camden's "Britain", 1610 ===
From thence runneth Wever downe by Nant-wich, not farre from Middlewich, and so to Northwich. These are verie famous Salt-wiches, five or sixe miles distant asunder, where brine or salt water is drawne out of pittes, which they powre not upon wood while it burneth; as the ancient Gaules and Germans were wont to doe, but boile over the fire, to make salt thereof. Neither doubt I, that these were knowne unto the Romans, and that from hence was usuallie paied the Custome for salt called Salarium. For, there went a notable high way from Middlewich to Northwich, raised with gravell to such an hight, that a man may easilie acknowledge that it was a worke of the Romans, seeing that all this countrie over, gravaile is so scarce: and from thence at this daie it is carried to private mens uses.

Mathew Paris writeth, that King Henrie the Third stopped up these Salt-pits, when in hostile manner hee wasted this shire: because the Welshmen, so tumultuous in those daies, should not haue any victuals or provisions from thence. But when the faire beames of peace beganne once to shine out, they were opened againe...

Then runneth [the River Dane] under Kinderton the old seat of the ancient race of the Venables; who ever since the first comming in of the Normans...commonly are called Barons of Kinderton. Beneath this, Southward, the little river Croco runneth also into Dan...

Croke the riveret aforesaid, being past Brereton, within a while after visiteth Middlewich, neere unto his confluence with Dan, where there bee two wells of salt water parted one from the other by a small brooke; Sheathes they call them: the one stands not open, but at certaine set times, because folke willingly steale the water thereof, as beeing of greater vertue and efficacie. From hence runneth Dan to Bostoke, in time past Botestoc, the ancient seat of the familie of the Bostokes knights...Out of this ancient house of the Bostoks, as out of a stock, sprung a goodlie number of the same name, in Ches-shire, Shropp-shire, Bark-shire and elsewhere.

== Longitudinal study of salt sites in Middlewich ==
=== Croxton Works ===
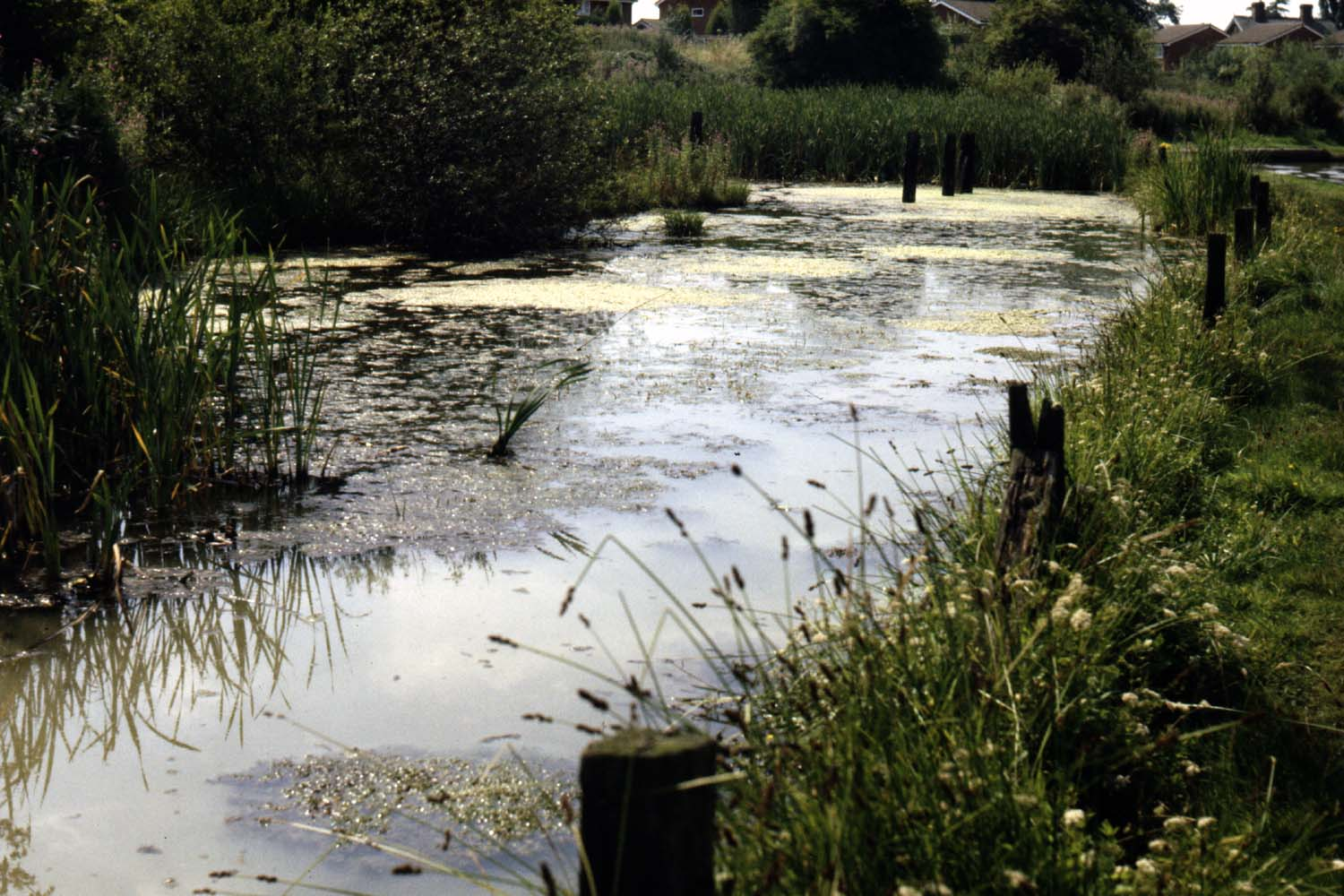
Remains of Croxton Salt Works (1980s)

The Croxton Works were located on the Trent and Mersey canal, approximately halfway between the Big Lock and the Croxton Lane Bridge at SJ699669. The works were established by the Dairy and Domestic Salt Company, probably in 1892. It was taken over by Henry Seddon before 1905 and worked until closed by subsidence in the 1920s. Until the early 1990s a derelict canal side warehouse still existed on the site, however this has now been demolished. All that remains now is a canal side flash (proposed as the site of a Middlewich Marina in the 1970s) and the foundations for the warehouse. Both the flash and warehouse foundations are now overgrown and hardly visible.

=== Kinderton Salt Works ===
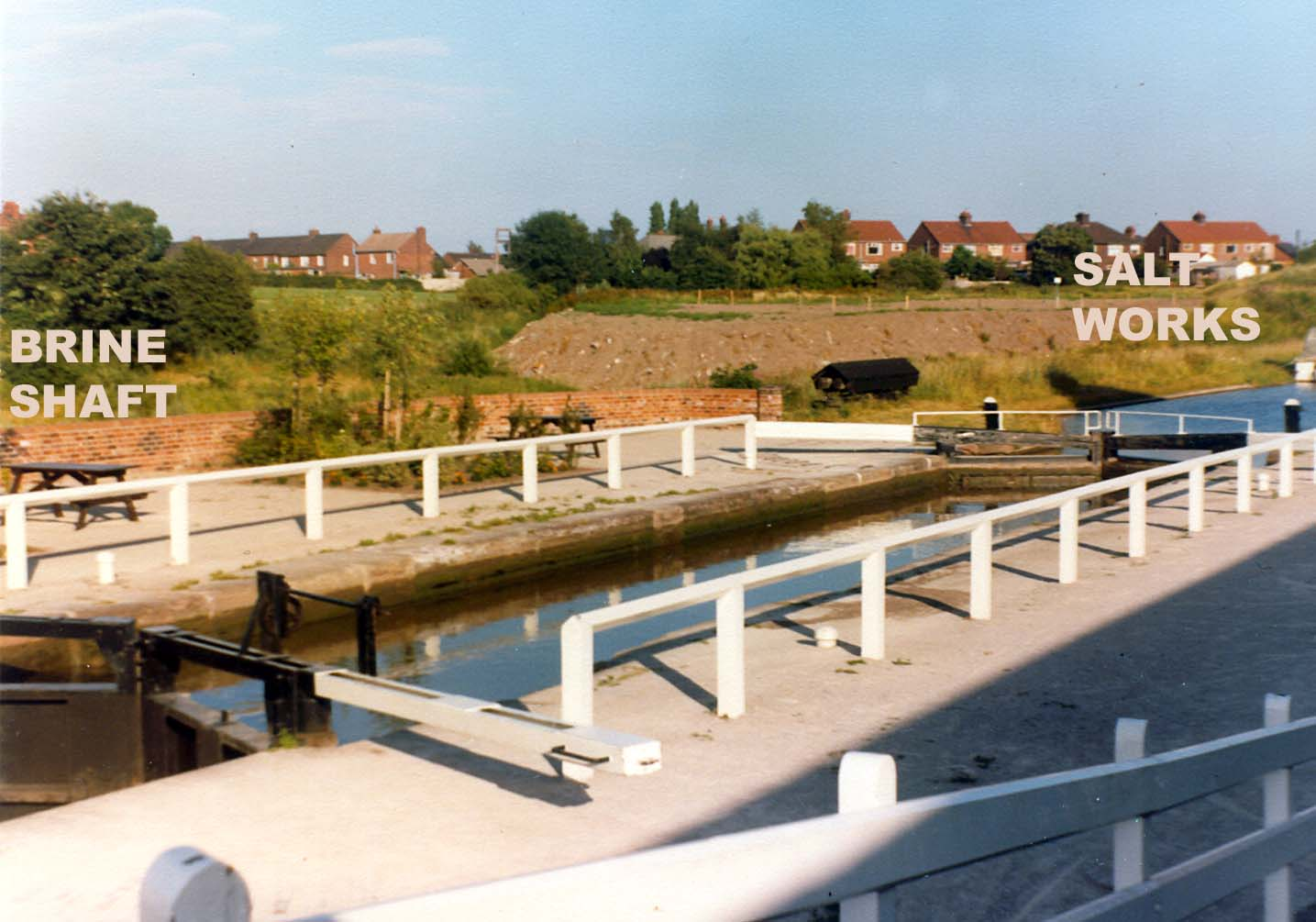
Site of Kinderton Salt Works (1980s)

It is likely that this is the only saltworks next to the Roman fort on Harbutt's field. Salt making sites in Cheshire places this site at SJ703668, however the 1882 Ordnance Survey map places the salt pans at approximately SJ7032266605, whilst Middlewich 900–1900 mentions the salt workings being yards away from the stone houses off King Street (i.e. the location given in the 1882 OS map). It is likely that this was the salt works of the Baron of Kinderton, Peter Venables, in 1671, and it is listed in documents of 1682 as producing a weekly output of 2,210 bushels of salt from its seven pans. By the mid-eighteenth century this was the only saltworks on the Kinderton side of the River Croco. In the mid nineteenth century Ralph Seddon owned the works, and on his death it was sold to the Salt Union in 1888. Sometime between 1888 and 1919 the site was dismantled, however a capped off shaft which once formed part of the works could be seen from the path running from King Street to the Big Lock until the new housing estate was built.

=== Pepper Street Salt Works ===
In around 1913 the Pepper Street salt works were rebuilt by Henry Seddon. Following a merger between Seddon and Sons and Cerebos in the late 1950s, the open pans at Pepper Street and those at the Cerebos site on Booth Lane were worked together as a single department, before being closed in 1968–1970. The Pepper Street works were demolished in the mid 1970s (at around the same time as the gas works on the opposite side of the canal), and the site is now a housing estate.

=== Wych House Lane Salt Works ===
In the 14th century the area around the current Wych House Lane was occupied by many salt houses. In 1892 a new salt works was established to the north of Wych House Lane, owned by the Dairy and Domestic Company. In common with many of the works this was taken over by Henry Seddon in the early 1900s. The works continued to be used until around 1969, and were used by the town council as a depot until the 1980s. The land is currently a green field running down to the canal.

=== Chesworth’s/Newtons Salt Works ===
Salt making sites in Cheshire locates Newtons Salt Works at the same site as Wych House Lane Salt works (SJ705662). However the 1898 map places Newtons Salt Works to the south side of Wych House Lane, at approximately SJ706661.

=== Aman's Salt Works ===
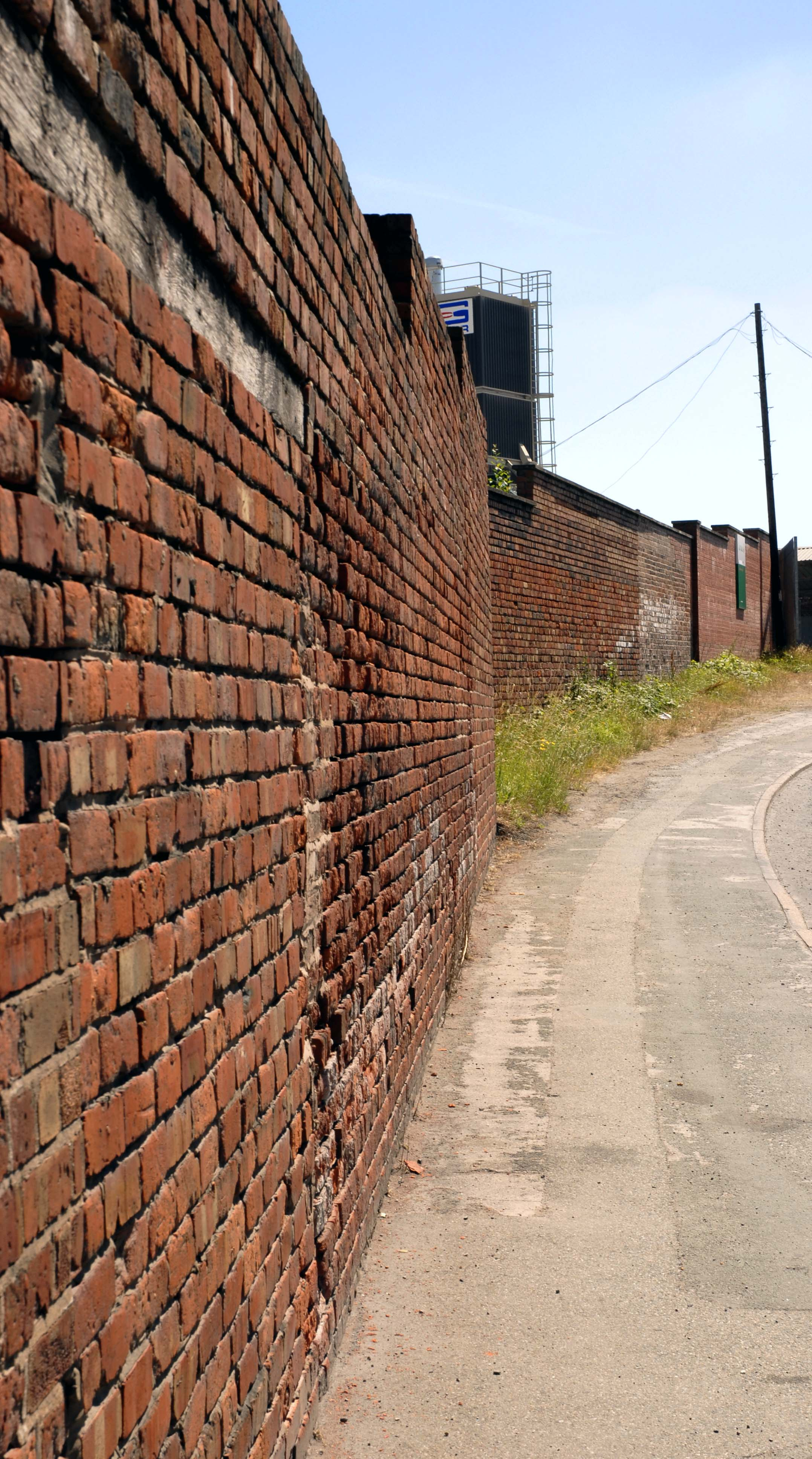
Aman's salt works, Middlewich, England

Aman's Salt Works was opened on Brooks Lane shortly after the discovery in 1889 of rock salt and brine at the adjacent Murgatroyd's site, with the earliest entry in the accounts book being 16 November 1892. The location of Aman's Works, between the Trent and Mersey canal and the railway branch line between Sandbach and Northwich, is indicative of the move from canals to railways for transport during the nineteenth century. To this end the works had its own siding and platform for loading trains adjacent to the branch line (around 300 metres from Middlewich railway station).

=== British Salt ===
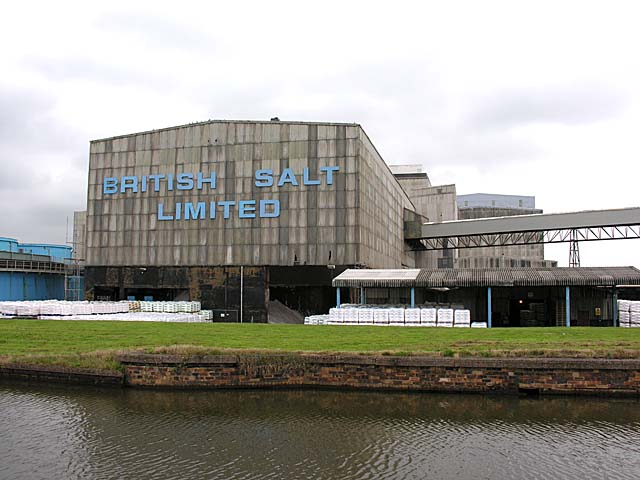
British Salt, Middlewich, England.

The only remaining salt works in Middlewich is the British Salt works at Cledford (SJ716644). This salt works obtains its brine from Warmingham nearby, rather than Middlewich. Salt from this works is sold by RHM under the Saxa brand.

== Regeneration ==
All of the old town centre salt works are now closed. Because of the aggressive chemicals that were handled, salt houses were 'temporary' structures, and so unlike the mills constructed in the mill towns of Lancashire, they would be unsuitable for conversion into other uses. Consequently, almost all the structures of the old salt works have been pulled down and the land has been put to other uses.

Images of salt workings now
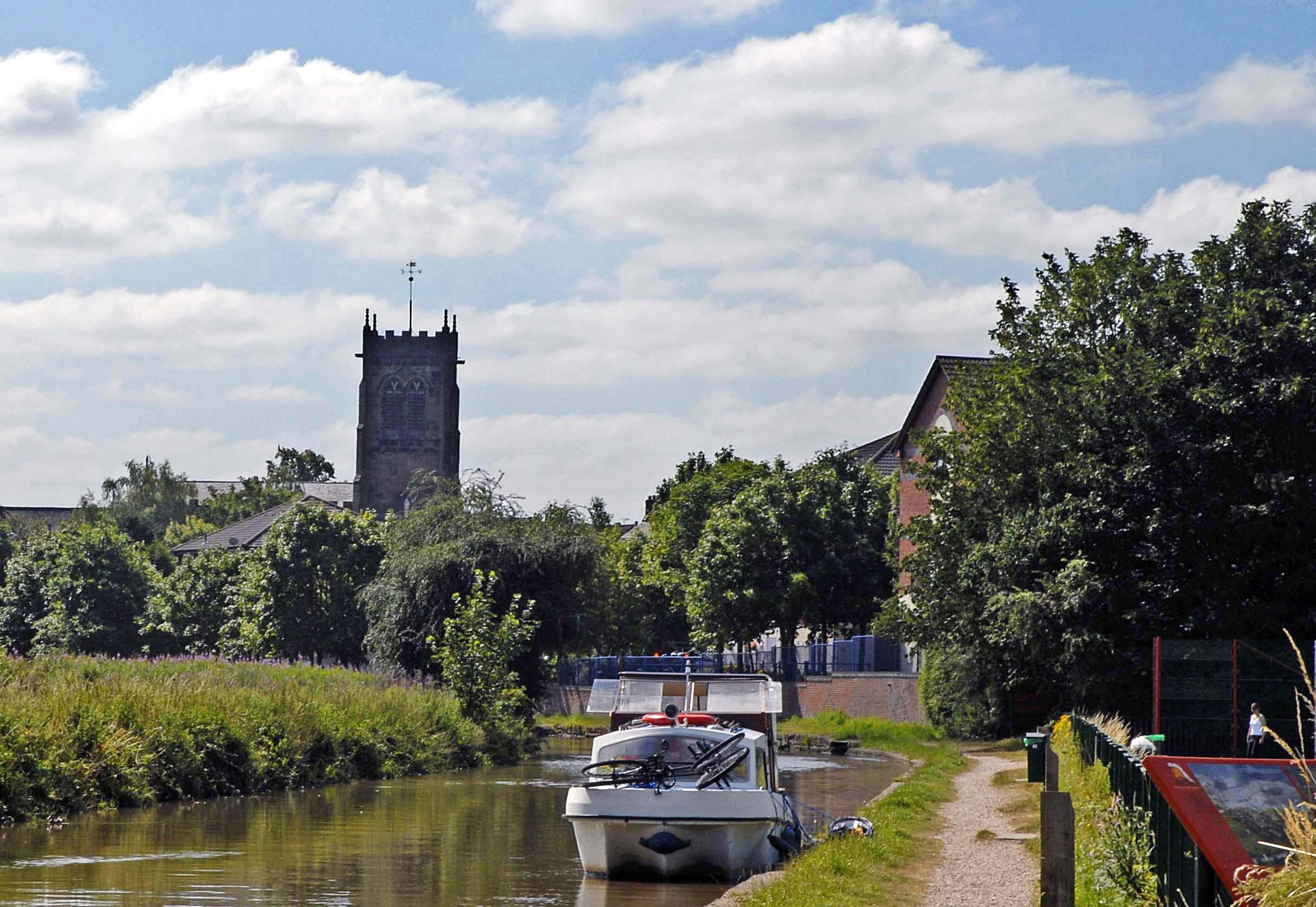
Pepper Street

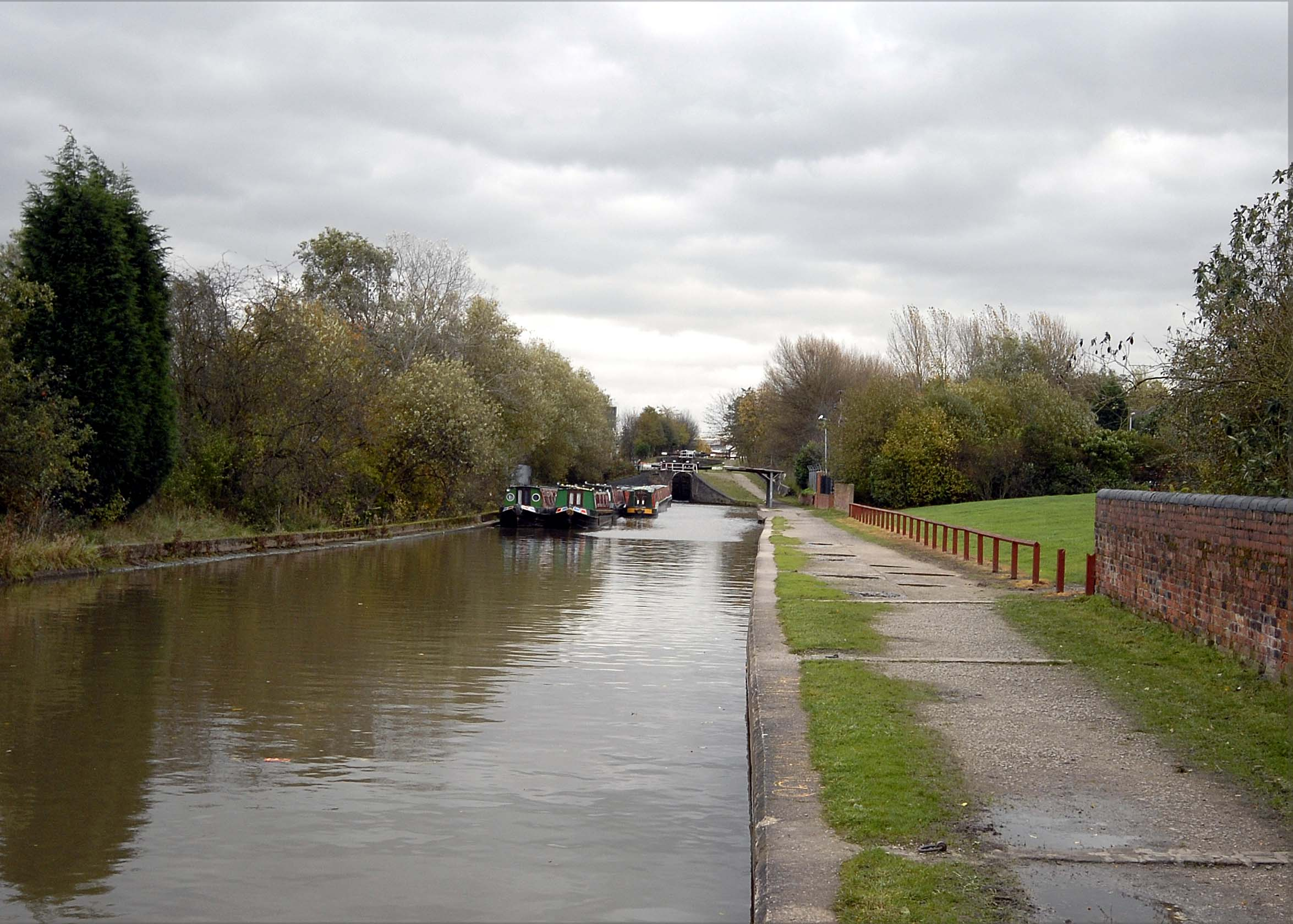
Amans

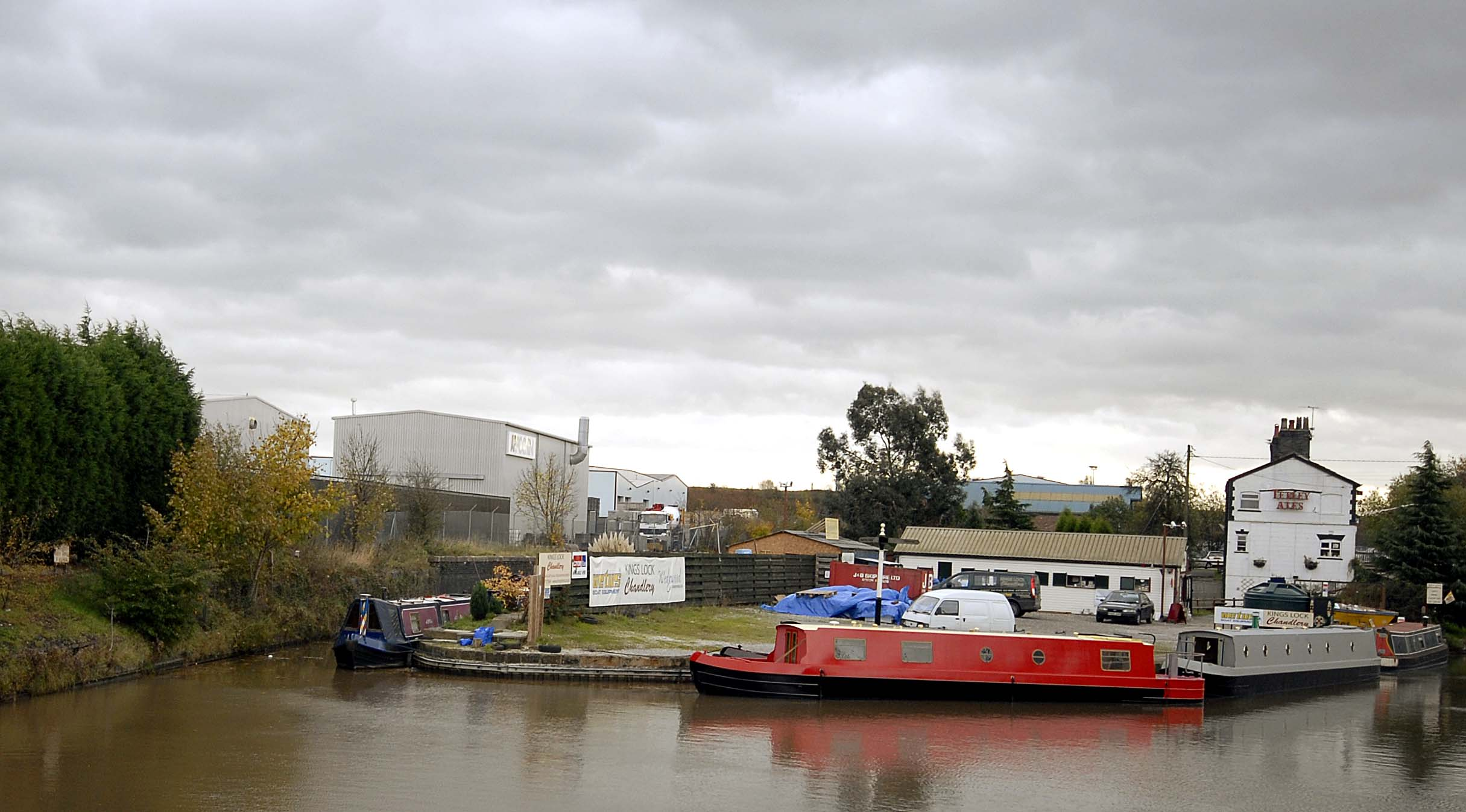
Brunner Mond

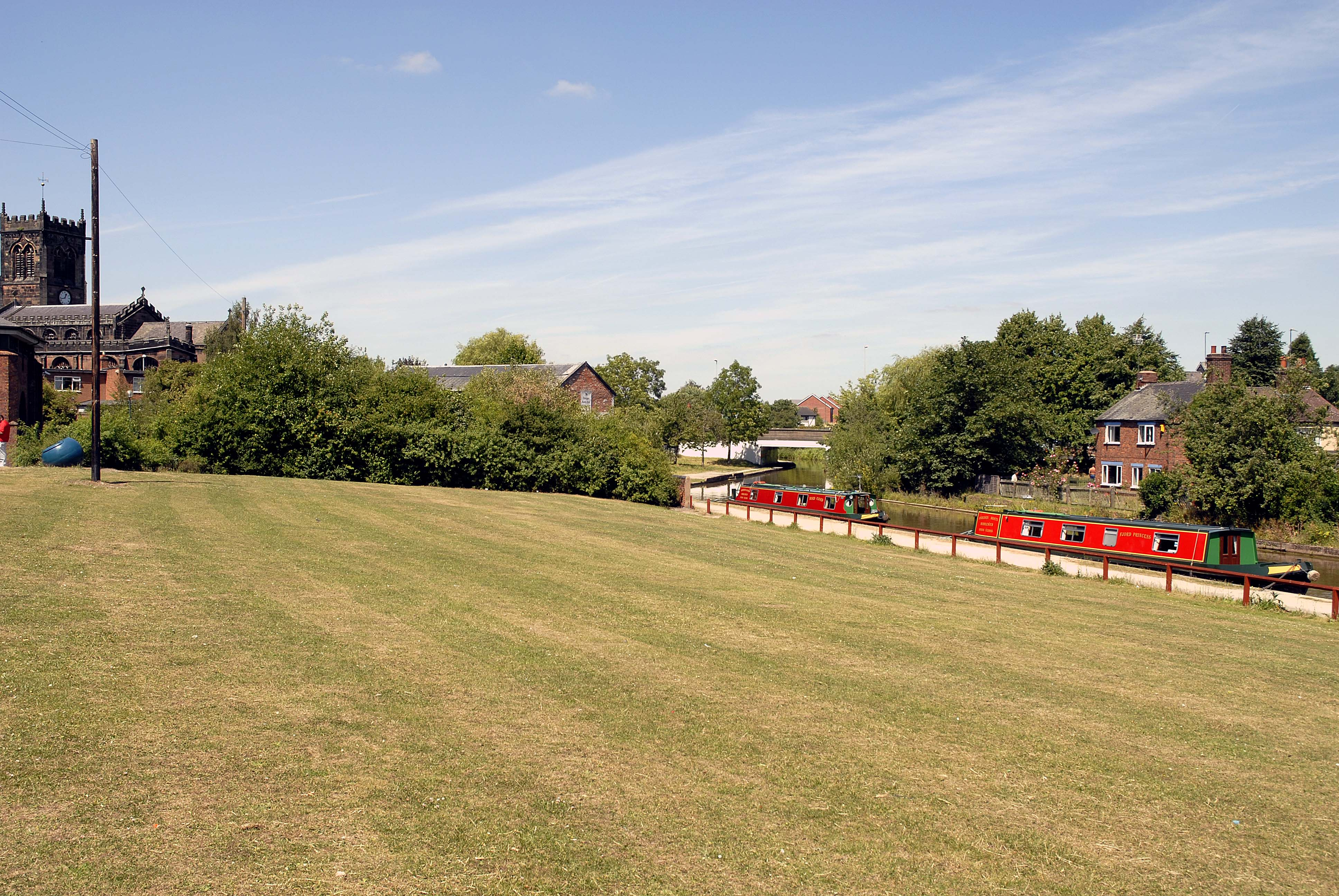
Wych House Lane

Timeline of salt workings in Middlewich (approximate dates)
	<-1400	<-1450	<-1500	<-1550	<-1600	<-1650	<-1700	<-1750	<-1800	<-1850	<-1900	<-1950	<-2000
Croxton Salt Works													
Kinderton Salt Works													
Pepper Street Salt Works													
Wych House Lane Salt Works													
Amans Salt Works													
British Salt													

== See also ==
- History of salt
- Salt in Cheshire
- Open pan salt making
- Weaver Hall Museum and Workhouse, Northwich
