= Open-pan salt making =

Brine derivative

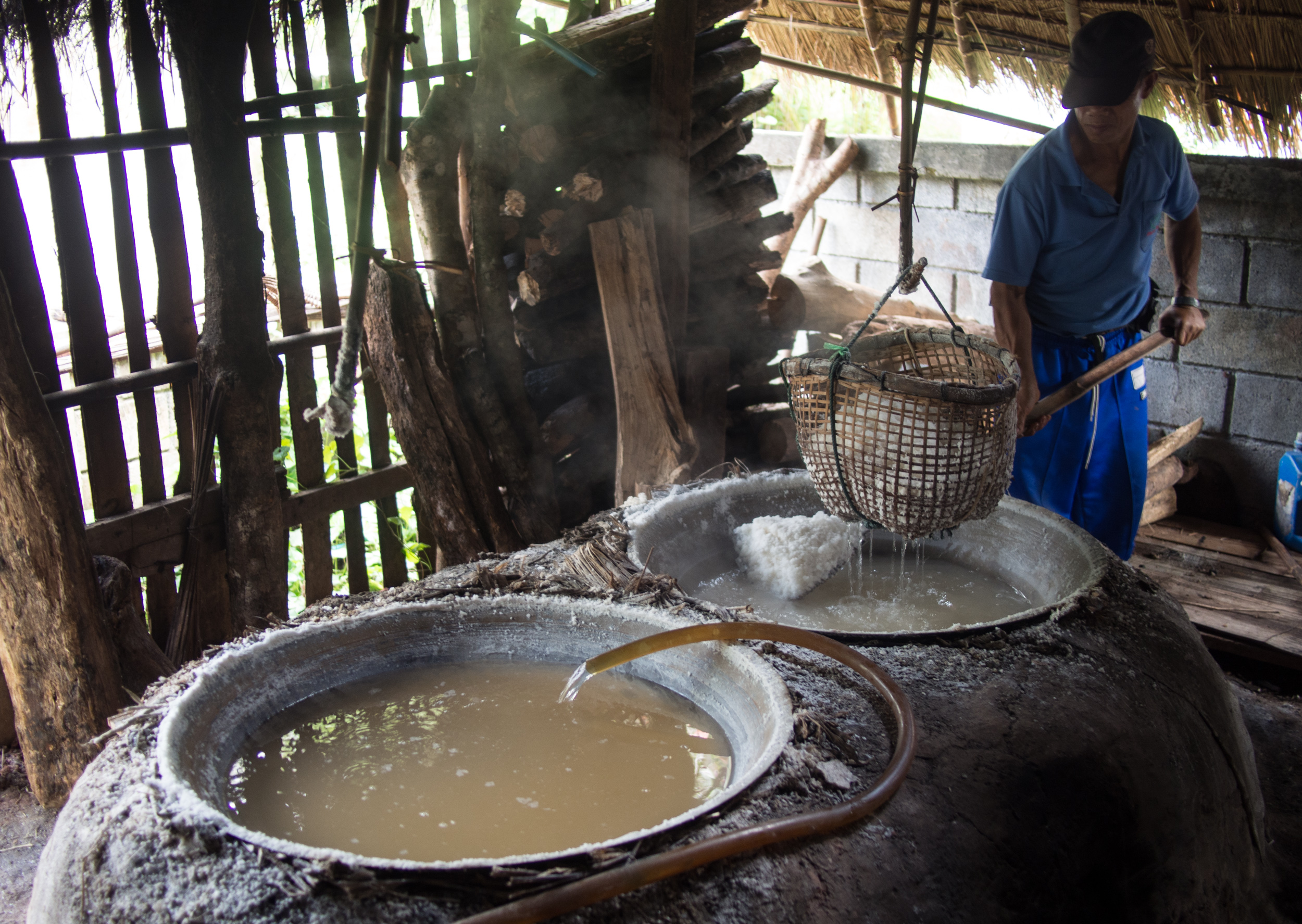
Salt is still produced in the traditional way in Bo Kluea, Nan Province, Thailand

Open-pan salt making is a method of salt production wherein salt is extracted from brine using open pans.

Virtually all European domestic salt is obtained by solution-mining of underground salt formations, although some is still obtained by the solar evaporation of seawater.

== Types of open-pan salt production ==
Salt is made in two ways traditionally. Rock salt is mined from the ground. The other type known as white salt is made by the evaporation of brine. Brine is obtained in several ways. Wild brine streams, occurring from the natural solution of rock salt by groundwater, can come to the surface as natural brine springs or can be pumped up to the surface at well, shafts or boreholes. Artificial brine is obtained through solution mining of rock salt with freshwater and is known as 'controlled brine pumping'. A bastard brine used to be made by allowing freshwater to run through abandoned rock salt mines. A salt-on-salt process strengthens brine by dissolving rock salt and/or crystal salt in weak brine or seawater before evaporation. Solar evaporation uses the sun to strengthen and evaporate seawater trapped on the sea-shore to make sea salt crystals, or to strengthen and evaporate brine sourced from natural springs where it is made into white salt crystals.

This led to three types of salt production, all of which used a variation of the open-pan salt method:

Coastal salt production, involving solar evaporation of seawater, followed by artificial evaporation of salt using the open-pan technique in structures known as 'salterns'.

Inland salt production, using brine from natural brine streams flowing over buried salt deposits that were pumped up from the ground and evaporated using the open-pan technique.

Salt refining, a large-scale salt industry developed in coastal locations and based on a combination of inland salt mining and coastal salt production. Referred to as salt refining or salt-on-salt, the process combined weak brine from seawater with mined rock salt, and evaporated the brine into a white salt.

== Inland open-pan salt production ==
Open-pan salt production was confined to a few locations where geological conditions preserved layers of salt beneath the ground. Only five complexes of inland open-pan salt works now survive in the world: Lion Salt Works, Cheshire, United Kingdom; Royal Saltworks at Arc-et-Senans, Salins-les-Bains, France; Saline Luisenhall, Göttingen, Germany; the Salinas da Fonte da Bica, Rio Maior, Portugal; and the Colorado Salt Works, USA. The two French saltworks at Salins-les-Bains and Arc-et-Senans became a UNESCO World Heritage Site in 1982.

The earliest examples of pans used in the solution mining of salt date back to ancient times when the pans were made of ceramics known as briquetage and Cheshire VCP (Very Coarse Pottery), a coarse low-fired pottery. In Britain, these materials began to be identified from the early 1980s in the Marches (Herefordshire, Worcestershire, Shropshire and Wales) and later in Northern England.

The Romans introduced small (3 ft square) pans made from lead using wood as a fuel. In Britain they established towns for salt production at Droitwich in Worcestershire, and Nantwich, Middlewich and Northwich in Cheshire. In the early Middle Ages these developed into the 'wich' towns of Cheshire. Small 'wich' houses containing several lead pans to evaporate the brine into salt, clustered around brine springs within each of the towns. The open-pan process continued largely unchanged throughout the medieval period. A 17th-century German wood-cut by Georgius Agricola shows the process in detail. Excavated evidence has uncovered wooden rakes to draw salt crystals to the side of the pan, and conical wicker baskets (barrows) in which the wet salt was drained and dried.

By the 17th century, the pans started to be made from iron, firstly in pans 7 ft (2.1 m) by 8 ft (2.4 m). William Brownrigg writing in 1748, in his Book of Common Salt, shows a wood-cut of one of these salt-making pans. The change to iron (from lead) coincided with a change from wood to coal for the purpose of heating the brine. Gradually, the pans increased in size. For example, Christoph Chrysel writing in 1773, in his Remarkable and very useful Information about the present Salt Works and Salt pans in England, noted that salt pans were 40 ft (12 m) wide and 27 ft (8.2 m) long and 1 ft (0.30 m) deep. Brine would be pumped into the pans, and concentrated by the heat of the fire burning underneath. As crystals of salt formed these would be raked out and more brine added.

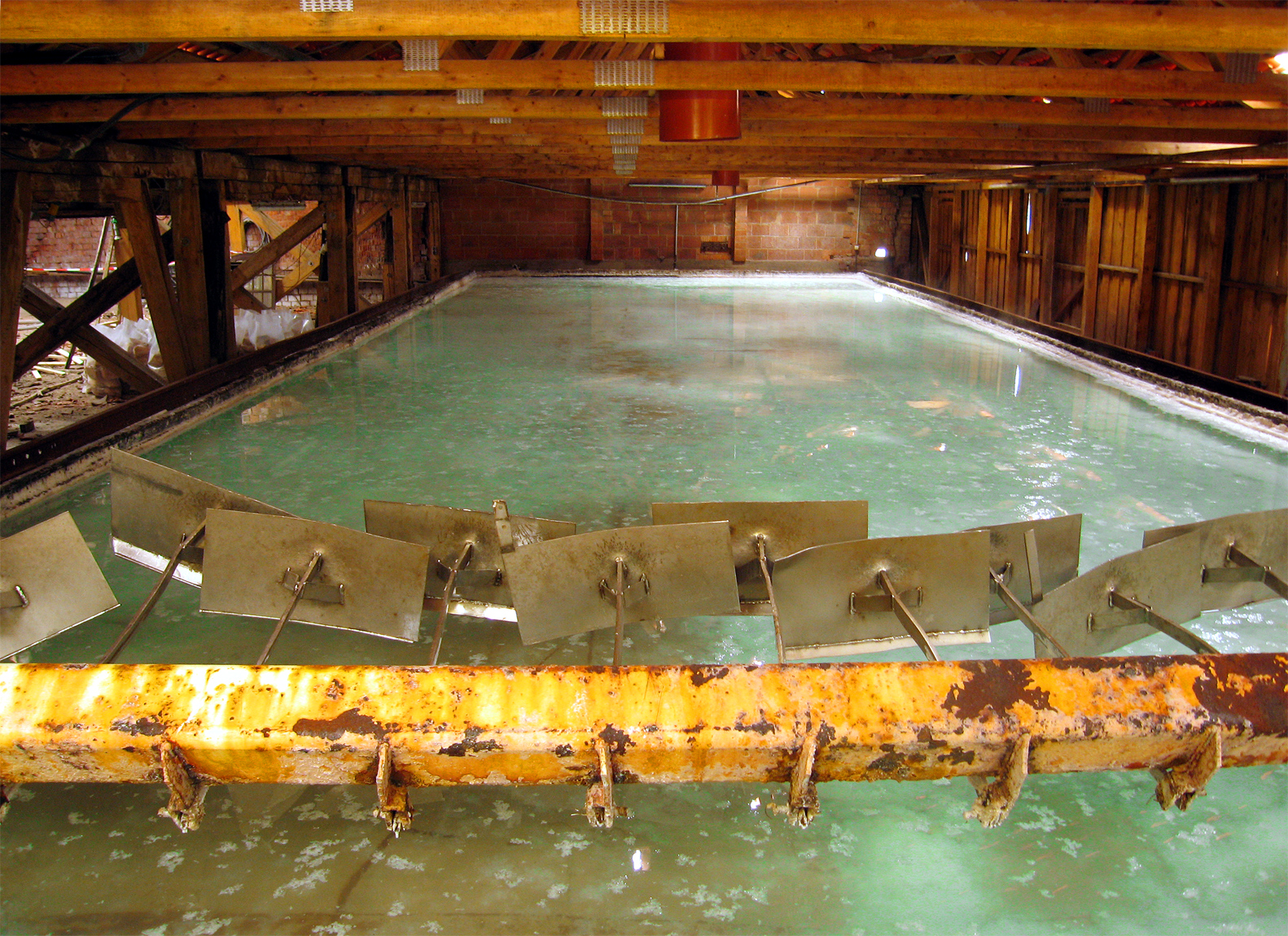
Open salt pan at Saline Luisenhall, Germany

By the 19th century, the open-pan salt process had reached its zenith in Britain. Two principal regions of production existed, Worcestershire and Cheshire. Brine shafts were sunk to the level of the brine stream that flowed over the natural rock salt or halite. Brine was pumped from the ground using wind and later, steam-driven beam engines, and redistributed to large iron pans.

These fell into two categories: Smaller fine pans were 35 feet (11 m) and about 25 feet (7.6 m) wide and about 1.5 feet (0.46 m) deep. They were housed in pan houses and had associated stove houses. The salt was evaporated in the pan at a high temperature of around 212 °F (100 °C). This produced higher quality grades of salt including 'Butter Salt', 'Dairy Salt', 'Calcutta Salt' and Lagos Salt'. After about six hours the salt would crystallise out of the brine solution and fall to the base of the pan. It was then the job of the lumpman to rake-up the salt and skim it into wooden tubs to create lumps, hence the name. The lumps would then be sent to the stove house or 'hothouse' to dry. Here the lumps would be piled up and the recycled heat from the fires beneath the pans used to heat the room before exhausting through a chimney. The salt lumps would be 'lofted' or passed up to a warehouse above by a man called the lofter. The lumps would be sold known as 'hand-it' lumps or processed in a crushing mill and then bagged.

The second larger common or fishery pans were 80 feet (24 m) long x 30 feet (9.1 m) wide x 2 feet (0.61 m) deep and were built outside. The pans were usually heated by coal and were controlled by a fireman. The larger pans would be heated at a much lower temperature between 100 and 160 °F (38 and 71 °C) for several days or even weeks. This would produce a much denser crystal with a variety of sizes known as common or fishery salt. Common salt was used for a variety of reasons but included the chemical industry. Fishery salt was used in the packing and processing of fish. The salt would not be made into lumps but instead was skimmed and turned out onto the wooden platforms around the pans. It was then barrowed in large wooden store houses.

== Occupations in an open-pan salt works ==
The following are historical names given to occupations in open pan salt works, primarily in Cheshire, England.

- Lumpman: A lumpman would work on pans that made fine salt crystals, which were known as 'fine pans' or 'lump pans'. The quality of the salt generally depended on the state of the fires which crystallized the salt by forcing off the water. Therefore, each pan had its own individual furnace and chimney, which the lumpman was responsible for controlling. Wooden moulds were filled with salt crystals from the pans to produce a hard block (lump) of fine salt. Lumpmen were paid piecework, and would start at 3 or 4 in the morning, and could expect to work 12- to 16-hour days.
- Waller: A waller would be under the charge of the lumpman, and was responsible for the initial draining of the salt. Salt was drained by being raked to the side of the pans, and then transferred using skimmers onto the hurdle boards (walkways) around the pans. A waller is an ancient name for a saltmaker. He would have been hired on a daily basis.
- Fireman: In addition to the fine pans there were other 'common pans', used to make coarser salt. Because the production of common salt required slower burning fires, it was possible for a single fireman to have charge of several common pans, which could be up to 80 feet (24 m) long.
- Pan-smith: This was originally the name given to the man who made the salt-making pans.

== See also ==
- Alberger process
- Grainer process
- History of salt in Middlewich
- Lion Salt Works
- Saline Luisenhall
- Salt in Cheshire
- Salt Museum, Northwich
- Seawater greenhouse
