= Witton, Northwich =

Suburb and ward of Northwich in Cheshire, England

Coordinates: 53.261790°N 2.498948°W

Witton cum Twambrooks/Witton
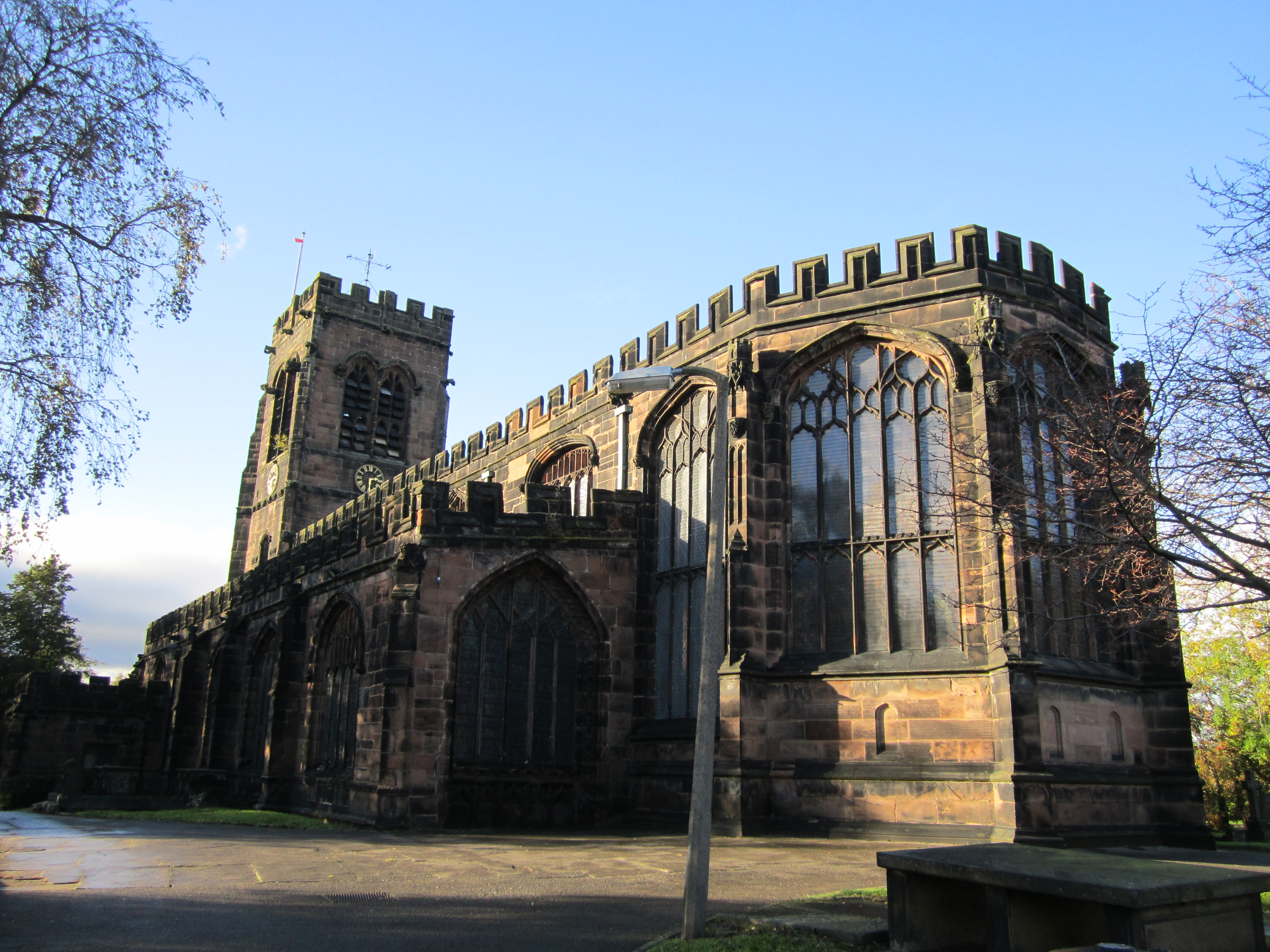
- St Helen Witton Church in Witton, Northwich

- Location within Cheshire
- Population: 5,116 (2021 Census Ward Profile)
  - London: 182 mi (293 km) SE
- Civil parish: Northwich
- Unitary authority: Cheshire West and Chester
- Ceremonial county: Cheshire
- Region: North West
- Country: England
- Sovereign state: United Kingdom
- Post town: Northwich
- Postcode district: CW9
- Dialling code: 01606
- Police: Cheshire
- Fire: Cheshire
- Ambulance: North West
- UK Parliament: Mid Cheshire

Witton cum Twambrooks, known simply now as Witton is the name given to both a historic township and ward in Northwich in the borough of Cheshire West and Chester in Cheshire, England. The name is now used for a ward covering the town centre and railway station.

== History ==
The grade I listed St Helen Witton Church dates back in part to the 14th century.

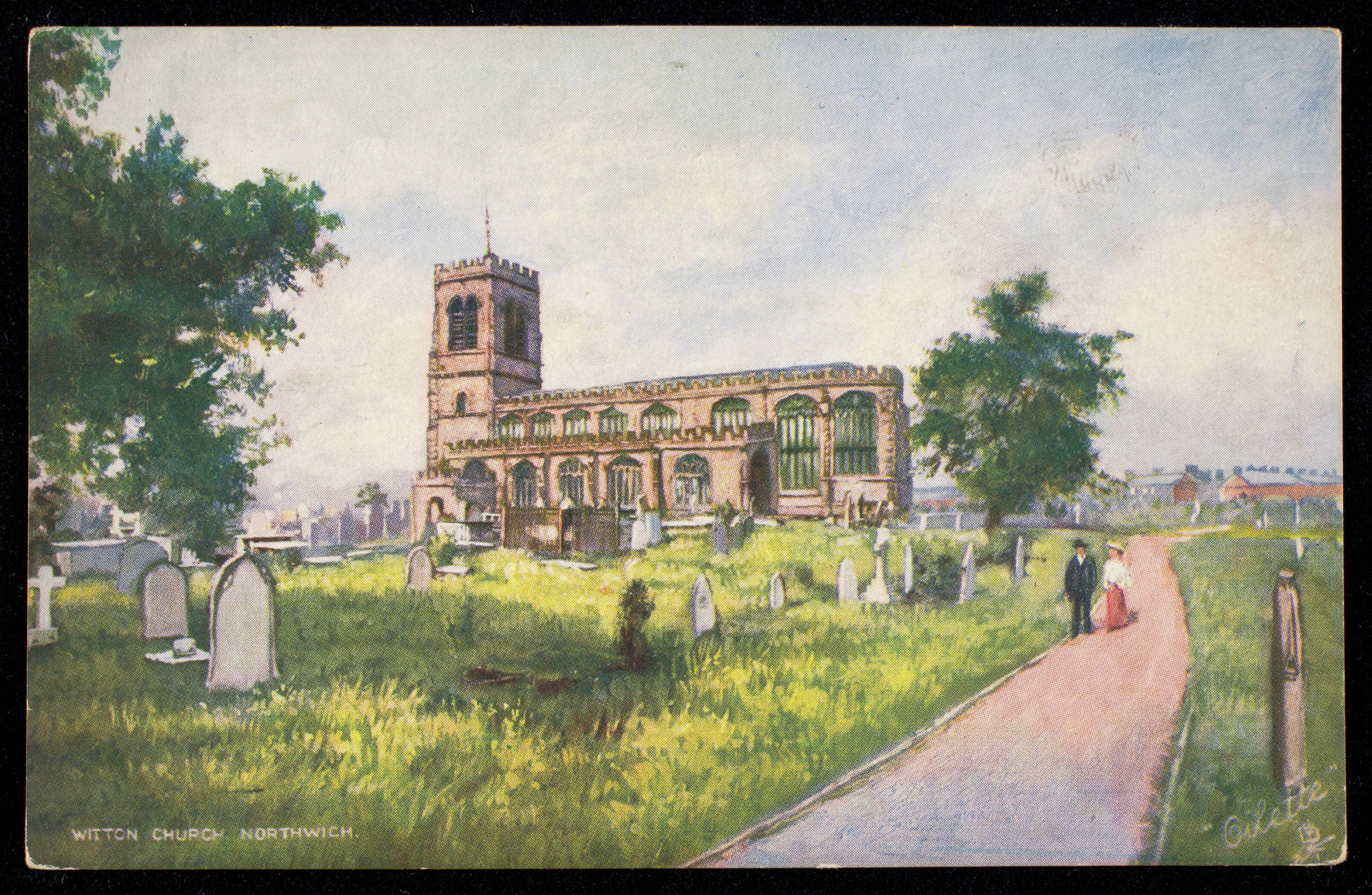
Witton Church in 1903

Until 1866, Witton was both a township and a chapelry in the Great Budworth parish in the Northwich hundred. In 1894 the parish was abolished and Witton later became part of the Northwich. Additionally, the village of Weaverham was part of the township of Hartford and the Witton chapelry. Northwich railway station opened in Witton on the Cheshire Lines which reached the area around 1863. The station though opened as Northwich and the name remained unchanged. Witton was later absorbed and built up to Northwich town centre and now forms both the central and eastern parts of the town, although its name survives as a ward on Northwich Town Council.
