= British Salt =

United Kingdom-based chemical company

British Salt Limited
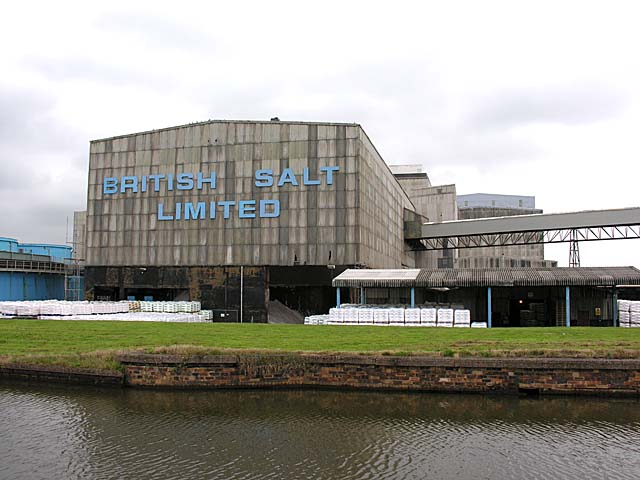
- British Salt plant near the Trent and Mersey Canal in Middlewich, Cheshire
- Type: Subsidiary
- Industry: Salt
- Headquarters: United Kingdom
- Parent: Tata Chemicals Europe

British Salt Limited is a United Kingdom-based chemical company that produces pure white salt. The company is owned by Tata Chemicals Europe after a buy out from private equity company LDC in April 2010. It is based in Middlewich, Cheshire, employs 125 people, and produces approximately 800,000 tonnes (880,000 tons) of pure white salt every year.

LDC bought British Salt from its previous owners, US Salt Holdings LLC in 2007, investing £35m in the company. A management team has taken a minority stake. US Salt had bought British Salt from its previous owners, Staveley Industries plc in 2000 for £80m. In 2005, British Salt acquired New Cheshire Salt Works Limited, known as NCSW Limited. This acquisition was referred to the Competition Commission who approved the purchase. Since the purchase the NCSW site in Wincham has been closed and the 198-acre (0.80 km^{2}) site sold to Chantry Developments.

The salt is extracted from strata that lie approximately 180 metres (590 ft) below ground. Bore holes are drilled into the strata and water is forced down to dissolve the salt. The resulting brine solution is pumped along 5 km (3.1 mi) of pipes back to the surface and direct into the Middlewich factory for purification and water evaporation to produce the pure salt. It is estimated that there are salt reserves sufficient for 200 years.

== Applications ==
The main uses for the salt products include:

- Water softeners
- Chemical industry
- Food processing
- Animal feeds
- Textiles and tanning

During the severe weather experienced in the UK in February 2009, British Salt also started to supply low-grade salt for de-icing of roads, after local authorities announced they were running very low on salt used for gritting due to the unexpected weather.

== See also ==
- History of salt in Middlewich
- Winter storms of 2009–2010
