= List of churches in Cheshire =

This is a list of Christian churches in the ceremonial county of Cheshire, England.

== Church of England ==
The Anglican churches in the county are either part of the diocese of Chester or the diocese of Liverpool. Since the mid nineteenth century, Chester diocese has been divided into two archdeaconries, the Chester Archdeaconry and the Macclesfield Archdeaconry. Each archdeaconry is divided into a number of deaneries, some of which are outside the ceremonial county of Cheshire. All the Cheshire churches in the diocese of Liverpool are in Warrington Archdeaconry. When the diocese was originally created in 1541, it was much larger with twenty deaneries and no archdeaconries. (See History of the Diocese of Chester.)

=== Diocese of Chester ===
==== Chester Archdeaconry ====
===== Chester Deanery =====
- St John the Evangelist's Church, Ashton Hayes
- St Bartholomew's Church, Barrow
- Holy Trinity Without-the-Walls Church, Blacon
- Christ Church, Chester
- St John the Baptist's Church, Chester
- St Paul's Church, Chester
- St Peter's Church, Chester
- St. Thomas of Canterbury Church, Chester
- St James' Church, Christleton
- St Mary's Church, Dodleston
- St Mary's Church, Eccleston
- St John the Baptist's Church, Guilden Sutton
- St Mary Without-the-Walls Church, Handbridge
- All Saints' Church, Hoole
- St Luke's Church, Huntington
- St Philip's Church, Kelsall
- St Mark's Church, Saltney
- St Michael's Church, Plas Newton
- St Peter's Church, Plemstall
- St Mary's Church, Pulford
- St Matthew's Church, Saltney (closed 2000)
- St Andrew's Church, Tarvin
- The Holy Ascension Church, Upton-by-Chester

===== Frodsham Deanery =====
- St John the Evangelist's Church, Alvanley
- Christ Church, Crowton
- St Luke's Church, Dunham on the Hill
- St Laurence's Church, Frodsham
- St Paul's Church, Helsby
- St James' Church, Ince
- St John the Evangelist's Church, Kingsley
- St John the Evangelist's Church, Manley
- St John the Evangelist's Church, Norley
- All Saints Church, Runcorn
- Holy Trinity Church, Runcorn
- St Andrew's Church, Grange, Runcorn
- St Berteline and St Christopher's Church, Norton, Runcorn
- St John the Evangelist's Church, Weston, Runcorn
- St Mark's Church, Hallwood, Runcorn (Ecumenical)
- St Mary's Church, Halton, Runcorn
- St Michael and All Angels Church, Runcorn
- St Mary's Church, Thornton-le-Moors

===== Great Budworth Deanery =====
- St Mark's Church, Antrobus
- St Cross Church, Appleton Thorn
- St Peter's Church, Aston-by-Sutton
- Christ Church, Barnton
- All Saints' Church, Daresbury
- St Wilfrid's Church, Grappenhall
- St Mary and All Saints Church, Great Budworth
- Christ Church, Latchford
- St Hilda's Church, Latchford
- St James' Church, Latchford
- St Michael and All Angels Church, Little Leigh
- St Luke's Church, Lower Whitley
- St Mary's Church, Lymm
- St Thomas' Church, Stockton Heath
- St Matthew's Church, Stretton
- All Saints Church, Thelwall
- St John the Evangelist's Church, Walton, Warrington

===== Malpas Deanery =====
- St John the Baptist's Church, Aldford
- Holy Trinity Church, Bickerton
- St Wenefrede's Church, Bickley
- St Mary's Church, Bruera
- St Boniface's Church, Bunbury
- St John's Church, Burwardsley
- St Mary's Church, Coddington
- St Chad's Church, Farndon
- All Saints Church, Handley
- St Peter's Church, Hargrave
- St Oswald's Church, Malpas
- St Michael's Church, Marbury
- St Edith's Church, Shocklach
- St Helen's Church, Tarporley
- St Alban's Church, Tattenhall
- St John's Church, Threapwood
- St Mary's Church, Tilston
- St Jude's Church, Tilstone Fearnall
- St Chad's Chapel, Tushingham
- St Chad's Church, Tushingham
- St Peter's Church, Waverton
- St Mary's Church, Whitewell

===== Middlewich Deanery =====
- St John the Evangelist's Church, Byley
- St Wilfrid's Church, Davenham
- St Peter's Church, Delamere
- St John the Baptist's Church, Hartford
- St Peter's Church, Little Budworth
- St John the Evangelist's Church, Lostock Gralam
- St. Michael and All Angels, Middlewich
- St Stephen's Church, Moulton
- Holy Trinity Church, Northwich
- St Helen Witton Church, Northwich
- St Luke's Church, Northwich
- St Chad's Church, Over
- St John the Evangelist's Church, Sandiway
- St Mary's Church, Weaverham
- Christ Church, Wharton
- St Mary's Church, Whitegate
- St John the Evangelist's Church, Winsford

===== Wirral South Deanery =====
- St Oswald's Church, Backford
- St Nicholas' Church, Burton
- Holy Trinity Church, Capenhurst
- Christ Church, Ellesmere Port (closed 1994)
- All Saints Church, Great Saughall
- St John the Evangelist's Church, Great Sutton
- St Paul's Church, Hooton
- St Mary's and St Helen's Church, Neston
- St Thomas' Church, Parkgate
- St Michael's Church, Shotwick
- Christ Church, Willaston

==== Macclesfield Archdeaconry ====
===== Bowdon Deanery =====
- St Peter's Church, Oughtrington
- St Elizabeth's Church, Ashley

===== Chadkirk Deanery =====
- St Mary's Church, Disley

===== Cheadle Deanery =====
- St Chad's Church, Handforth
- St George's Church, Poynton

===== Congleton Deanery =====
- Christ Church, Alsager
- St Mary Magdalene's Church, Alsager
- St Mary's Church, Astbury
- St Bertoline's Church, Barthomley
- St Oswald's Church, Brereton
- All Saints Church, Church Lawton
- Holy Trinity Church, Congleton
- St James' Church, Congleton
- St John the Evangelist's Church, Congleton
- St Peter's Church, Congleton
- St Stephen's Church, Congleton
- Christ Church, Eaton
- St Peter's Church, Elworth
- St Luke's Church, Goostrey
- St Philip's Church, Hassall Green
- St Luke's Church, Holmes Chapel
- St Michael's Church, Hulme Walfield
- St Luke's Church, Oakhanger
- All Saints Church, Odd Rode
- St Mary's Church, Sandbach
- St John the Evangelist's Church, Sandbach Heath
- St John the Baptist's Church, Smallwood
- St Leonard's Church, Warmingham
- Christ Church, Wheelock
- St Peter's Church, Swettenham

===== Knutsford Deanery =====
- St Philip's Church, Alderley Edge
- St Catherine's Church, Birtles
- Holy Trinity Church, Bollington
- St John the Evangelist's Church, Chelford
- St John's Church, High Legh
- St Mary's Chapel, High Legh
- St Cross Church, Knutsford
- St John the Baptist's Church, Knutsford
- St John's Church, Lindow
- St Oswald's Church, Lower Peover
- All Saints Church, Marthall
- St Wilfrid's Church, Mobberley
- St Mary's Church, Nether Alderley
- St Lawrence's Church, Over Peover
- St Paul's Church, Over Tabley
- St Mary's Church, Rostherne
- St Peter's Church, Tabley
- St John the Evangelist's Church, Toft
- St Bartholomew's Church, Wilmslow
- Christ Church, Woodford

===== Macclesfield Deanery =====
- St John the Baptist's Church, Bollington
- St Oswald's Church, Bollington
- Church of St Mary the Virgin, Bosley
- Holy Trinity Chapel, Capesthorne
- Forest Chapel
- St James' Church, Gawsworth
- St Thomas' Church, Henbury
- Holy Trinity, Hurdsfield
- All Saints Church, Macclesfield
- Holy Trinity Church, Macclesfield
- St Barnabas, Church, Macclesfield
- St John the Evangelist's Church, Macclesfield
- St Michael's Church, Macclesfield
- St Paul's Church, Macclesfield
- St Peter's Church, Macclesfield
- St James' and St Paul's Church, Marton
- St Michael's Church, North Rode
- St Christopher's Church, Pott Shrigley
- St Peter's Church, Prestbury
- Holy Trinity Church, Rainow
- St John the Baptist's Church, Saltersford
- All Saints Church, Siddington
- St James' Church, Sutton
- Church of the Resurrection, Upton Priory
- St Saviour's Church, Wildboarclough
- St Michael's Church, Wincle

===== Nantwich Deanery =====
- St Mary's Church, Acton
- St James' Church, Audlem
- St Michael's Church, Baddiley
- St Mary's and St Michael's Church, Burleydam
- St Bartholomew's Church, Church Minshull
- St Michael's Church, Coppenhall
- All Saints Church, Crewe
- Christ Church, Crewe
- St Andrew's Church, Crewe
- St Barnabas' Church, Crewe
- St John the Baptist's Church, Crewe
- St Paul's Church, Crewe
- St Peter's Church, Crewe
- St Michael and All Angels Church, Crewe Green
- St John's Church, Doddington
- St Matthew's Church, Haslington
- St Peter's Church, Leighton-cum-Minshull Vernon
- St Mary's Church, Nantwich
- All Saints Church, Weston
- St David's Church, Wettenhall
- Church of St Mary the Virgin, Wistaston
- St Oswald's Church, Worleston
- St Margaret's Church, Wrenbury
- St Chad's Church, Wybunbury

=== Diocese of Liverpool ===
==== Archdeaconry of Warrington ====
===== Warrington Deanery =====
- Holy Trinity Church, Warrington
- St Ann's Church, Warrington
- St Barnabas' Church, Warrington
- St Elphin's Church, Warrington
- St Andrew's Church, Orford, Warrington
- St Margaret and All Hallows Church, Orford, Warrington
- St Mark's Church, Dallam, Warrington
- Christ Church, Padgate, Warrington
- Church of the Ascension, Woolston, Warrington
- Church of the Transfiguration, Birchwood, Warrington
- Church of the Resurrection and St Bridget's, Cinnamon Brow, Warrington (shared with Roman Catholics)
- St Philip's Church, Westbrook, Warrington
- St James' Church, Westbrook, Warrington
- St Paul's Church, Penketh, Warrington
- St Mary's Church, Great Sankey, Warrington

===== Widnes Deanery =====
- St Mary's Church, Hale
- St Michael with St Thomas Church
- St Ambrose's Church, Widnes
- St Basil and All Saints Church, Hough Green, Widnes (shared with Roman Catholics)
- St John's Church, Widnes
- St Luke's Church, Farnworth, Widnes
- St Mary's Church, Widnes
- St Paul's Church, Widnes

===== Winwick Deanery =====
- St Michael's Church, Burtonwood, Warrington
- Christ Church, Croft with Southworth, Warrington
- All Saints Church, Glazebury, Warrington
- Newchurch Parish Church, Culcheth, Warrington
- St Oswald's Church, Winwick, Warrington
- St Helen's Church, Hollinfare, Warrington
- St Peter's Church, Newton-le-Willows
- All Saints' Church, Newton-le-Willows
- St John's Church, Earlestown

== Roman Catholic ==
The Roman Catholic churches in Cheshire are part of either the diocese of Shrewsbury or the archdiocese of Liverpool. The Cheshire churches in the archdiocese of Liverpool are in the pastoral areas of Warrington and Widnes.

=== Diocese of Shrewsbury ===
- St Pius X Church, Alderley Edge
- St Gabriel's Church, Alsager
- St Monica's Church, Appleton
- Our Lady of Fatima's Church, Barnton
- St Gregory's Church, Bollington
- St Francis' Church, Chester
- St Clare's Church, Chester
- St Columba's Church, Chester
- St Theresa's Church, Chester
- St Werburgh's Church, Chester
- St Mary's Church, Congleton
- St Mary's Church, Crewe
- Church of Our Lady of the Sea, Ellesmere Port
- St Bernard's Church, Ellesmere Port
- St Luke's Church, Frodsham
- St Saviour's Church, Great Sutton
- St Benedict's Church, Handforth
- St Margaret's Church, Holmes Chapel
- St Mary of the Angels Church, Hooton
- St Vincent de Paul's Church, Knutsford
- Our Lady and St Augustine's Church, Latchford
- St Winefride's Church, Lymm
- St Alban's Church, Macclesfield
- St Edward the Confessor's Church, Macclesfield
- St Joseph's Church, Malpas
- St Mary's Church, Middlewich
- St Cuthbert's Church, Mouldsworth
- St Anne's Church, Nantwich
- St Winefride's Church, Neston
- St Wilfrid's Church, Northwich
- St Paul's Church, Poynton
- Holy Spirit Church, Runcorn
- Our Lady's Church, Runcorn
- St Augustine's Church, Runcorn
- St Edward's Church, Runcorn
- St Martin de Porres' Church, Runcorn
- St Winefride's Church, Sandbach
- St Thomas Becket's Church, Tarporley
- St Plegmund's Church, Tattenhall
- St Bede's Church, Weaverham
- Sacred Heart and St Teresa's Church, Wilmslow
- St Joseph's Church, Winsford

=== Archdiocese of Liverpool ===
==== Warrington Pastoral Area ====
- St Paul of the Cross Church, Burtonwood
- St Stephen's Church, Orford
- St Joseph's Church, Penketh
- Sacred Heart Church, Warrington
- St Alban's Church, Warrington
- Church of the Resurrection and St Bridget's Church, Cinnamon Brow
- St Anselm's Chapel, Warrington
- St Benedict's Church, Warrington
- St Mary's Church, Warrington
- St Oswald's Church, Warrington
- St Peter and St Michael's Church, Woolston

==== Widnes Pastoral Area ====
- Holy Family Church, Cronton
- Our Lady of Perpetual Succour, Hough Green, Widnes
- St Bede's Church, Widnes
- St John Fisher's Church, Widnes
- St Michael's Church, Ditton, Widnes

== Methodist ==
The Methodist churches are part of the Chester and Stoke-on-Trent District, the Manchester and Stockport District or the Liverpool District. Each district is divided into circuits.

=== Chester and Stoke-on-Trent District ===
==== Chester Circuit ====
- Bretton
- Caldy Valley Neighbourhood Church
- Christleton
- Garden Lane, Guilden Sutton (closed 2013)
- Hamilton Street, Hoole
- Huxley
- Mickle Trafford
- Rowton
- Saltney
- Saughall
- Tarvin Road, Boughton
- Wesley

==== Congleton Circuit ====
- Bosley
- Brookhouse Green
- Cloud
- Congleton Edge
- Davenport
- Key Green
- Lower Withington
- Rood Lane
- Trinity
- Wellspring

==== Crewe Circuit ====
- Bradfield Rd
- Hough
- North Street
- St.Mark's
- St.John's
- St.Stephen's
- Wells Green.

==== Delamere Forest Circuit ====
- Bunbury with Tiverton
- Frodsham
- Helsby
- Kelsall
- Kingsley, Blakelees
- Kingsley, The Hurst
- Norley
- Oakmere with Ashton
- Tarporley
- Tarvin

==== Middlewich Circuit ====
- Bradshaw Brook
- Goostrey
- Holmes Chapel
- Middlewich

==== Nantwich Circuit ====
- Audlem
- Baddiley and Ravensmoor
- Barbridge
- Betley
- Broomhall and Sound
- Broad Lane
- Chorlton
- Hankelow
- Hatherton
- Nantwich
- Poole
- Willaston
- Woore

==== Northwich Circuit ====
- Acton Bridge
- Barnton
- Bartington
- Castle, Comberbach
- Cuddington
- Davenham
- Hartford
- Lostock Green
- Northwich
- Moulton
- Pickmere
- Plumley
- Sandiway
- Shurlach
- Weaverham

==== Runcorn Circuit ====
- Beechwood West
- Bethesda
- Hallwood Parish
- Halton, Trinity
- Murdishaw Church (Norton Parish)
- Preston-on-the-Hill
- St Mark's
- St.Paul's
- The Heath
- Wicksten Drive

==== Sandbach and Alsager Circuit ====
- Alsager, Hassall Road
- Alsager, Wesley Place
- Bradwall
- Elworth, The Avenue
- Elworth, Mount Pleasant
- Ettiley Heath, Haslington
- Oakhanger
- Rode Heath
- Sandbach
- Sandbach Heath
- Wheelock
- Winterley

==== Winsford Circuit ====
- Chester Road
- Clive Green
- Little Budworth
- St.Andrew's
- Trinity
- Weaver
- Whitegate

=== Liverpool District ===
==== South Wirral Circuit ====
- Trinity, Ellesmere Port
- Elton
- Zion, Little Neston
- Little Sutton
- Neston
- Whitby
- Willaston

==== Warrington Circuit ====
- Antrobus
- Hood Manor
- Latchford
- Lymm
- Padgate
- Penketh
- Rixton
- Stockton Heath
- St Philip's, Westbrook
- St Martin's, Woolston

==== Widnes Circuit ====
- Cronton
- Farnworth
- Halebank
- Hough Green
- Trinity, Widnes

== United Reformed ==
United Reformed churches in Cheshire include the following.

- Birchwood
- Blacon
- Bollington
- Sealand Road, Chester
- Vicars Cross, Chester
- Congleton
- The Rock Chapel, Farndon
- Caldy Valley, Great Boughton
- Handbridge
- Haslington and Crewe
- Hoole
- Lymm
- Macclesfield
- High Street, Malpas
- Middlewich
- Minshull
- Nantwich
- Winsford
- Northwich
- Parkgate and Neston
- Beechwood West, Runcorn
- Bethesda, Runcorn
- St Mark's Runcorn
- Upton-by-Chester
- Elmwood Avenue, Warrington
- St John's Warrington
- Wycliffe, Warrington
- Trinity, Widnes
- Wilmslow
- Over, Wilmslow

== Baptist ==
Cheshire churches in the Baptist Union include the following.

- Milton, Acton Bridge
- Audlem Baptist Church
- Hoole, Chester
- Crewe, Union Street Baptist Church
- Disley
- Little Leigh
- Lymm
- Bethel, Macclesfield
- Macclesfield
- Nantwich
- Poynton
- Sandbach
- Tarporley
- Arpley Street, Warrington
- Hill Cliffe, Warrington
- Latchford, Warrington
- Widnes

== Other active churches ==
=== Church of God ===
- New Testament Church of God, Crewe

=== Elim Pentecostal ===
Elim Pentecostal Churches in Cheshire.

- Elim Pentecostal Church, Chester
- Crewe New Life Community Church
- West Street Church, Crewe
- Elim Christian Life Centre, Macclesfield
- Elim Pentecostal Church, Nantwich
- King's Church, Warrington
- Farnworth Christian Fellowship, Widnes

=== Assemblies of God ===
Assemblies of God churches include:

- !Audacious Church
- Alsager Community Church
- Christian Life Church, Bollington
- Queen Street Christian Centre, Chester
- Oasis Christian Centre, Ellesmere Port
- The Foundry, Golborne Campus
- Calvary Christian Centre, Macclesfield
- Middlewich Community Church
- Barnton Pentecostal Church, Northwich
- Poynton Christian Fellowship
- Hope Corner Community Church, Runcorn
- Bethany Pentecostal Church, Warrington
- Assembly of God, Wilmslow
- Life Church, Warrington
- Life Church, Lymm
- The Foundry, Widnes Campus
- The Foundry, Dallam Campus

=== Winsford Churches Together ===
Winsford Churches Together is a Group of all Churches in the Winsford area.

- River of Life Church, Winsford
- Christ Church Wharton, Winsford
- Living Waters Christian Ministries, Dingle Centre and Queen's Parade, Winsford
- Over United Reformed Church, Winsford
- The Storehouse Church, Winsford
- Over, St Chad's Church, Winsford
- The Salvation Army, Winsford
- St John's Church Over, Winsford
- St Joseph's Catholic Church, Winsford
- St Andrews Methodist Church, Winsford

=== Unclassified ===
Other churches identified in the UK Church Directory include the following.

- English Presbyterian Church of Wales, Chester
- Pentecostal Holiness Church "Continuing" Upton, Chester
- Upton Baptist Church (Independent), Upton, Chester
- Main Street Community Church, Frodsham
- Good News Church, Macclesfield
- Macclesfield Family Church
- Neston Christian Fellowship
- Bethesda Evangelical Church, Stockton Heath
- Stockton Heath Christian Fellowship
- The Storehouse Church Cheshire, Tarporley
- Tytherington Family Worship Church
- Hebron Church, Warrington
- CrossRoads Community Church in South Cheshire
- Kingsway Chapel, Newton, Chester

== Redundant churches ==
- Holy Trinity Church, Chester (Guildhall)
- Church of St Mary-on-the-Hill, Chester (educational centre)
- St Michael's Church, Chester (heritage centre)
- St Nicholas' Chapel, Chester (shop)
- All Saints Church, Harthill (community centre)
- Christ Church, Macclesfield (redundant)
- Congregational Chapel, Nantwich (residential)
- Primitive Methodist Chapel, Nantwich (part residential, part unused)
- Wesleyan Methodist Church, Nantwich (unused)
- Christ Church, Weston Point, Runcorn (unused)
- Mariners' Mission, Runcorn (industrial use)
- Welsh Chapel, Runcorn (unused)
- Warburton Old Church
- St Ann's (old) Church, Warrington (indoor climbing centre)
- St Marie's Church, Widnes (unused)
- St Chad's Church, Wybunbury (only tower still stands)
