= Listed buildings in Crewe =

The railway town of Crewe in Cheshire, England, contains 34 buildings recorded in the National Heritage List for England as designated listed buildings. Each is at Grade II, the lowest of the three gradings given to listed buildings, and applied to "buildings of national importance and special interest". Until the Grand Junction Railway established a railway station in 1837, Crewe was a "tiny township with a few farms". There are only two listed buildings dating from before the arrival of the railway: a much altered farmhouse that probably originated in the 16th century and a timber-framed farmhouse dating from the late 17th century. In 1842 the locomotive works opened, and Crewe had become an important railway junction, with lines coming from Birmingham and the south, and then going on to Chester, Manchester, and Liverpool. Houses were built to accommodate the railway workers. Most of these have been demolished, but some have survived and have been listed; these are in Betley, Dorfold, Tollitt, and Victoria Streets. There is also a surviving manager's house at 47 Delamere Street.

Churches and chapels were built to serve the workers, and seven survivors, or part-survivors are listed. With the development of the town came civic buildings, listed examples of which include the Municipal Building, the Market Hall, an orphanage, and a theatre. Notable educational establishments are the listed Ruskin Road School and a teacher-training college now part of Manchester Metropolitan University. To provide a place of recreation for the workers, the railway established Queens Park in 1887–88, commissioning Edward Kemp to assist in its design. (Note: The park is listed at Grade II* in the Register of Historic Parks and Gardens.) The listed buildings in the park are its two lodges, a clock tower, and a memorial to those lost in the South African Wars. Later, in 1922, came a memorial to the First World War, which was originally sited in the Market Square. In 2020 another war memorial was listed to remember workers from the Crewe tranship shed.

Name and location	Photograph	Date	Notes
The Old Farm; 53.10827°N 2.44805°W	—	16th century (probable)	A former farmhouse, with later alterations converting it into a dwelling. It is basically timber-framed, now mainly in rendered brick, and has a slate roof. The building has a T-shaped plan, is in two storeys with an attic, and has a front of four bays. The windows are casements, and the gables have bargeboards. Inside, there are two inglenooks.
Foden's Farm; 53.11397°N 2.43112°W	—	Late 17th century	The farmhouse is timber-framed with brick nogging and a tiled roof. It is in two storeys and has a three-bay front. The windows are casements. To the left is a single-storey extension with a rendered gable.
Christadelphian Hall; 53.09551°N 2.44225°W		1847	Originally a Congregational church, it was converted into offices in 1869, and has since been used as a Christadelphian Hall. It is built in brick with a slate roof, and is in Gothic Revival style. The hall has a three-bay entrance front with an entrance and three windows with Y-tracery. At the top is a ramped battlemented parapet with crocketed pinnacles.
1–19 Betley Street; 53.09699°N 2.44327°W		c. 1848	A terrace of ten cottages designed by John Cunningham for the Grand Junction Railway. They are in brick on a stone plinth, with slate roofs. The cottages are in two storeys, and each cottage has a two-bay front. They are in pairs, with adjacent entrances. The windows are sliding sashes.
2–20 Betley Street; 53.09699°N 2.44299°W	—	c. 1848	A terrace of ten cottages designed by John Cunningham for the Grand Junction Railway. They are in brick on a stone plinth, with slate roofs. The cottages are in two storeys, and each cottage has a two-bay front. They are in pairs, with adjacent entrances. The windows are sliding sashes.
1–19 Dorfold Street; 53.09697°N 2.44249°W		c. 1848	A terrace of ten cottages designed by John Cunningham for the Grand Junction Railway. They are in brick on a stone plinth, with slate roofs. The cottages are in two storeys, and each cottage has a two-bay front. They are in pairs, and have adjacent entrances with Tudor arched porches. The windows in the porches are casements, elsewhere they are sliding sashes.
2–20 Dorfold Street; 53.09699°N 2.44327°W	—	c. 1848	A terrace of ten cottages designed by John Cunningham for the Grand Junction Railway. They are in brick on a stone plinth, with slate roofs. The cottages are in two storeys, and each cottage has a two-bay front. They are in pairs, and have adjacent entrances with Tudor arched porches. The windows in the porches are casements, elsewhere they are sliding sashes.
1–9 Tollitt Street; 53.09701°N 2.44386°W	—	c. 1848	A terrace of ten cottages designed by John Cunningham for the Grand Junction Railway. They are in brick on a stone plinth, with slate roofs. The cottages are in two storeys, and each cottage has a two-bay front. They are in pairs, and have adjacent entrances with Tudor arched porches. The windows in the porches are casements, elsewhere they are sliding sashes.
47 Delamere Street; 53.09763°N 2.44647°W		c. 1850	This originated as the house for a railway manager, and has since been converted for other uses. It is built in brick with slate roofs, and is in two storeys with an attic. There is a three-bay front, the central bay having a projecting timber porch. In the left bay is an oriel window with five lights, and the right bay is gabled with a hexagonal bay window. All the windows are sashes.
76–90A Victoria Street; 53.09874°N 2.44525°W		c. 1850	A row of eight houses designed by John Cunningham for the Grand Junction Railway, later divided into 16 dwellings. They are built in brick, and have slate roofs with tiled ridges. The houses are in two storeys, and each house has a three-bay front. There are projecting single-storey porches leading to doorways with fanlights. The windows are sashes with stone sills and lintels.
Market Hall; 53.09848°N 2.43985°W		1854	The market hall was designed by Charles Meason, the tower was added in 1871, and the roof was replaced in the late 20th century. It is built in red and yellow brick with stone dressings. The entrance front has three bays, and there are 15 bays along the sides. On the front are three arched entrances, a corbel table, and over the central bay is a pediment. Above this is a clock tower topped by a slate mansard roof with iron cresting.
1867 Buildings, Crewe railway station 53.08931°N 2.43263°W		1867	The buildings were constructed when the station was rebuilt to the south of Nantwich Road under the supervision of William Baker. They are built in cream and orange brick and terracotta. The buildings consist of two linear station buildings on separate platforms and two screen walls, one to the east and the other to the west of the station.
Christ Church Tower; 53.09688°N 2.44008°W		1877	The body of the church was built in 1843 by the Grand Junction Railway, with other parts added later. The tower was designed by the company's engineer, J. W, Stanley. Most of the church was demolished in 1978, leaving the tower standing. This is constructed in sandstone, and contains a west door above which is a large window with Geometrical tracery. There are clock faces on all sides, above which are triple lancet bell openings. At the top of the tower are octagonal pinnacles, and a stepped parapet with crocketed gables.
The Three Lamps; 53.09851°N 2.44120°W	—	1880	Originating as a gas light column, this has been converted to electricity. It is in cast iron, and consists of a circular base with a nine-shaft column. From this spring three foliated arms, each carrying a lamp. A fourth lamp rises from the centre of the top of the column.
Union Street Baptist Church; 53.09180°N 2.44030°W		1882–84	The church was designed by J. Wallis Chapman, and is constructed in brick with stone dressings and tiled roofs. At the rear are attached meeting rooms, offices, and a vestry, forming a T-shaped plan. At the entrance front is an arched doorway, above which is a rose window. To the right of this is a stair turret surmounted by an octagonal timber-framed lantern with a pyramidal roof. To the left of the entrance is another, lower, canted stair turret, with continuous glazing in the upper stage. In addition to the attached buildings, the boundary wall and railings are included in the listing.
St Michael's Church; 53.10602°N 2.44742°W		1883–86	This replaced earlier churches on the site, the chancel being designed by James Brooks, and the nave added by the successors in the practice in 1905–07. It is built in brick with a slate roof. The church consists of a nave, aisles, transepts, and a chancel. On the roof is a prominent copper-covered flèche. The windows are lancets. Inside the church, at the west end, is a baptistry with a three-arch arcade.
St Barnabas' Church; 53.10201°N 2.46279°W		1884–85	The church was designed by Paley and Austin, and paid for by the London and North Western Railway. It is built in brick with terracotta dressings and a tiled roof, and is in Perpendicular style. The church consists of a nave, aisles, a chancel, and a vestry. Towards the west end is a shingled flèche.
St Barnabas' Vicarage; 53.10211°N 2.46216°W	—	c. 1885	The vicarage was probably designed by Paley and Austin. It is in brown brick with blue brick diapering and has a tiled roof. The building is in two storeys, and has a four-bay front. The second and fourth bays have gables with bargeboards. The windows are casements, some with stone mullioned and transomed surrounds. On the garden front are an octagonal bay window and an oriel window.
East Lodge, Queens Park; 53.09853°N 2.46736°W		1887–88	The lodge was designed by John Brooke. It is in sandstone with applied timber-framing to the upper storey, and a gabled roof. The lodge is in two storeys, and has a three-bay front. There is a single-storey porch with a hipped roof, an inscribed bressumer between the floors, and a copper-covered bell cupola. The windows are casements, those in the lower storey being mullioned and tramsomed. The gables have bargeboards, and the gable in the north face contains a decorative panel.
West Lodge, Queens Park; 53.09860°N 2.46770°W		1887–88	The lodge was designed by John Brooke. It is in sandstone with applied timber-framing to the upper storey, and a gabled roof. The lodge is in two storeys, and has a three-bay front. There is a single-storey porch with a hipped roof, an inscribed bressumer between the floors, and a copper-covered bell cupola. The windows are casements, those in the lower storey being mullioned and tramsomed. The gables have bargeboards, and the gable in the north face contains a decorative panel.
Lyceum Theatre; 53.09763°N 2.44647°W		1887–89	The theatre was designed by Alfred Darbyshire, but burnt down in 1910, and was rebuilt by Albert Winstanley. It is constructed in brick with slate roofs. The theatre is in two parts. The left part has two storeys and four bays, and contains the entrance and offices. The right part contains the auditorium, it is gabled, in three storeys, and has a front of five unequal bays. The interior is elaborately decorated.
Clock Tower, Queens Park; 53.09843°N 2.46761°W		1888	The clock tower was paid for by the employees of the London and North Western Railway, and was designed by John Brooke. It has a stone base containing medallions with portraits of Queen Victoria and members of the railway board. From this rises a shaft in striped brick that carries a projecting stone cap with clock faces on four sides. Above the clock faces are pediments, and on top of the tower is elaborate wrought iron cresting with a weathervane.
St Mary's Church; 53.09783°N 2.44675°W		1890–91	A Roman Catholic church designed by Pugin and Pugin, the tower being added later. It is built in brick with sandstone dressings and a slate roof, and is in free Decorated style. It consists of a nave with a clerestory, aisles, a chancel with a polygonal apse, and a southwest tower with a pyramidal roof. Inside the church, the arcades are carried on octagonal piers, and there is an elaborate canopied reredos.
Municipal Buildings; 53.09843°N 2.43947°W		1902–05	The building was designed by H. T. Hare in Baroque style. It is constructed in sandstone with a stone slate roof. The building has 2½ storeys, and a front of five bays. The centre three bays are recessed, and flanked and separated by large Ionic columns. In the centre is a semicircular-headed entrance with wrought iron gates, and this is flanked by semicircular-headed windows; all these are surmounted by carved reclining figures representing the trades and industries of Crewe. Along the top is a balustraded parapet, behind which are dormers. At the summit of the building is a cupola with a weathervane, and a finial in the form of a locomotive.
South African War Memorial; 53.09695°N 2.46846°W		1904	The memorial was designed by Joseph Whitehead. This consists of the bronze figure of a soldier holding a rifle, standing on a marble plinth with a sandstone cap. There are bronze plaques on the four sides of the plinth.
Ruskin Road School; 53.09041°N 2.44702°W	—	1909	This was built as a secondary school, and was designed by Harry Beswick. It is in Neo-Georgian style, and built in brick with terracotta dressings and slate roofs. The school has a T-shaped plan, is in three storeys, and has a front of 23 bays. In the top storey, some bays have Diocletian windows under pediments containing roundels. At the top of the school is an octagonal cupola with a weathervane.
Caretaker's House, Ruskin Road School; 53.09069°N 2.44771°W	—	1909	The house was designed by Harry Beswick. It is in brick with terracotta dressings, and has a Westmorland slate roof. The house is in two storeys, and has a front of three bays with a single bay on the sides. The windows are sashes.
Webb House; 53.10006°N 2.46909°W		1909	This originated an orphanage, designed by John Brooke, and built through a bequest in the will of F. W. Webb, and since converted into other uses. It is in free Baroque style, and constructed in brick with stone dressings and a slate roof. The building is in two storeys with attics, and has a front of 23 bays, the end and centre bays projecting forward. It has a single-story Tuscan-style porch, and a central clock tower crowned by a cupola.
Police Training College; 53.08566°N 2.44884°W	—	c. 1910	Originating as an Ursuline convent and school in Arts and Crafts style, it has since been converted into offices and flats, and in 2002 was a police training college. The building is constructed in brick with stone dressings and a slate roof. It has an L-shaped plan, is in three storeys with attics, and has two wings, each with four bays. The windows are sashes, some of which are in gabled dormers with decorative bargeboards. On the front are panels carved with lily motifs.
Delaney Building; 53.09233°N 2.42299°W	—	1911	This was built as Crewe Teacher Training College, and after various educational uses later became part of Manchester Metropolitan University. It was designed by Harry Beswick, and is built in brick and terracotta with a slate roof. The building is in an H-plan, has a single-storey front which extends for eleven bays; there is a two-storey section at the rear. The middle seven bays project forward and have a central pediment. The lower windows are round-headed and those above are circular. There are two pedimented entrances, and at the top of the building is a tall domed cupola.
St Peter's Church; 53.09822°N 2.43322°W		1914–23	The church was designed by J. Brooke and C. E. Elcock, its construction being delayed by the First World War. It is built in sandstone with green slate roofs. The church consists of a narthex, a nave, aisles, and a chancel with a north organ chamber and a south vestry. At the west end is a double bellcote with a cross finial. The windows are Perpendicular-style alternating with lancets.
Crewe War Memorial; 53.09801°N 2.43955°W		1922	The memorial consists of a bronze statue of Britannia standing on a limestone base and pedestal. The sculptor was Walter Gilbert, and the statue was cast in the foundry of H. H. Martin and Company. It depicts Britannia standing on chains, holding a trident and a palm leaf. There are inscriptions around the pedestal, and large bronze plaques with the names of the fallen on the base.
Tranship Shed War Memorial; 53.09689°N 2.43995°W	—	1925	The war memorial was raised by the London North Western Railway and the London Midland and Scottish Railway to commemorate its workers from the Crewe tranship shed lost in the First World War, and the names of those lost in the Second World War were later added. It was originally located in the Basford Hall Sidings, but moved to the site of Christ Church, adjacent to the listed tower in 1999. The memorial is in buff sandstone, and consists of a stone slab with a shallow pyramidal capital over a dentilled cornice. It has a moulded three-stepped foot, and stands on a single square step. On the memorial are carved flowers and a wreath in relief, an inscription, and the names of those lost.
Drill hall 53.09317°N 2.44387°W	—	1937	The drill hall is in brick with concrete dressings, it has a slate roof, and is in Moderne style. The drill hall consists of a two-storey administrative and domestic block at the west, a hall to the east, a separate garage, and a single-storey rifle range. The west face is symmetrical with a hipped roof, overhanging eaves, and it contains steel-framed windows. On the north front are two similar entrance portals, with narrowing doorways approached by flights of six splayed steps, and above each entrance is a curved brick fin. At the left end is a flat-roofed outshut.

== See also ==
- Listed buildings in Crewe Green
- Listed buildings in Haslington
- Listed buildings in Moston
- Listed buildings in Warmingham
- Listed buildings in Weston
- Listed buildings in Wistaston
- Listed buildings in Woolstanwood

== Notes and references ==
Notes

Citations

Sources

- Brandwood, Geoff; Austin, Tim; Hughes, John; Price, James (2012), The Architecture of Sharpe, Paley and Austin, Swindon: English Heritage, ISBN 978-1-84802-049-8
- Hartwell, Clare; Hyde, Matthew; Hubbard, Edward; Pevsner, Nikolaus (2011) [1971], Cheshire, The Buildings of England, New Haven and London: Yale University Press, ISBN 978-0-300-17043-6
- Morris, Edward; Roberts, Emma (2012), Public Sculpture of Cheshire and Merseyside (excluding Liverpool), Public Sculpture of Britain, vol. 15, Liverpool: Liverpool University Press, ISBN 978-1-84631-492-6
- Sylvester, Dorothy (1980), A History of Cheshire (2nd ed.), London and Chichester: Phillimore, ISBN 0-85033-384-9
