= Religion in Cheshire =

Religious beliefs in Cheshire (England)

Religion in Cheshire, England, and, in particular, Christianity, has a long history. In the 2001 census, however 1 in 5 people either were recorded as no religion or religion not stated. The boundary of the Church of England Diocese of Chester currently follows most closely the pre-1974 county boundary of Cheshire, so it includes all of Wirral, most of Stockport, and the Cheshire panhandle, that included Tintwistle Rural District council area. In terms of Roman Catholic church administration, the majority of Cheshire falls into the Roman Catholic Diocese of Shrewsbury. Cheshire still has a slightly higher proportion of Christians than the rest of the North West of England.

There is an Islamic organisation in Cheshire called Islamic Forum Cheshire it is affiliated to the Muslim Council of Britain.

In Cheshire there were number of Jewish congregations some of which were set up by World War II evacuees the only remaining is Chester Hebrew Congregation. In Cheshire there is also a Jewish Primary School called North Cheshire Jewish Primary School.

There are a number of Buddhist centres in Cheshire, including Kagyu Buddhism Cheshire, and Odiyana Buddhist Meditation Centre which provides classes in Buddhism throughout the county.

In Warrington, there is a Sikh Gurdwara called Guru Nanak Gurdwara Sikh Temple built by the Indian community in Cheshire.

In Crewe, the Ahmadi Religion of Peace and Light is headquartered at Webb House.

== Religious group breakdown ==
According to the 2001 Census, the religious group breakdown in Cheshire was:

Religion	Chester	Congleton	Crewe and Nantwich	Ellesmere Port and Neston	Macclesfield	Vale Royal	Total
Christian	92,377 (78.1%)	73,844 (81.5%)	89,080 (80.2%)	67,396 (82.5%)	119,508 (79.6%)	100,208 (82.1%)	542,413 (80.5%)
Buddhist	236 (0.2%)	107 (0.1%)	151 (0.1%)	108 (0.1%)	292 (0.2%)	200 (0.2%)	1,091 (0.2%)
Hindu	206 (0.2%)	97 (0.1%)	129 (0.1%)	65 (0.1%)	391 (0.3%)	123 (0.1%)	1,010 (0.1%)
Jewish	132 (0.1%)	52 (0.1%)	48 (0.0%)	40 (0.0%)	459 (0.3%)	52 (0.0%)	798 (0.1%)
Muslim	630 (0.5%)	154 (0.2%)	459 (0.4%)	212 (0.3%)	767 (0.5%)	211 (0.2%)	2,433 (0.4%)
Sikh	65 (0.1%)	34 (0.0%)	46 (0.0%)	27 (0.0%)	86 (0.1%)	73 (0.1%)	333 (0.0%)
All other religions	197 (0.2%)	141 (0.2%)	165 (0.1%)	62 (0.1%)	283 (0.2%)	176 (0.1%)	1033 (0.2%)
No religion	15,342 (13.0%)	10,389 (11.5%)	13,222 (11.9%)	8,340 (10.2%)	19,146 (12.8%)	13,315 (10.9%)	79,754 (11.8%)
Religion not stated	9,024 (7.6%)	5,828 (6.4%)	7,707 (6.9%)	5,407 (6.6%)	9,225 (6.1%)	7,732 (6.3%)	44,923 (6.7%)

== See also ==
- List of churches in Cheshire
