= Minshull Vernon =

Hamlet in Cheshire, England

Coordinates: 53.14°N 2.473°W

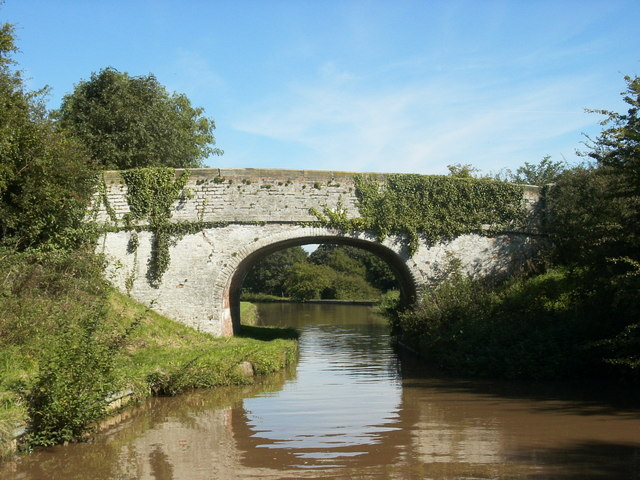
- Hollingshead Bridge on the Shropshire Union Canal

- Location within Cheshire
- Population: 391 (2011)
- OS grid reference: SJ683603
- Unitary authority: Cheshire East
- Ceremonial county: Cheshire
- Region: North West
- Country: England
- Sovereign state: United Kingdom
- Post town: CREWE
- Postcode district: CW1
- Dialling code: 01270
- UK Parliament: Chester South and Eddisbury

Minshull Vernon is a hamlet and civil parish in the unitary authority of Cheshire East and the ceremonial county of Cheshire, England. The hamlet lies 3 miles (5 km) to the north west of Crewe, south east of Winsford and south west of Middlewich. The parish also includes the small settlements of Bradfield Green, Eardswick, Hoolgrave, Minshull Hill, Walley's Green and Weaver Bank. The total population of the civil parish is somewhat over 200, measured at 391 in the Census 2011. Nearby villages include Church Minshull, Warmingham and Wimboldsley.

The River Weaver and the Middlewich Branch of the Shropshire Union Canal run through the area.

== History ==
A Roman road between Nantwich and Middlewich ran northwards through the civil parish; several stretches of the road, as well as a Roman bridge, have been uncovered in excavations. Minshull Vernon and the adjacent parish of Church Minshull appear in the Domesday survey as Maneshale, which formed part of the extensive lands of William Malbank (also William Malbedeng) and had a hawk's eyrie and four deer enclosures. The remains of two medieval moated sites provide evidence for settlement during that period. In the Tudor period, Minshull Vernon formed part of the lands of the Venable family, lords of Middlewich. A description of the parish from the early 17th century records its great and spacious farms.

There were three churches or chapels in the 19th century, Congregational (1809), Wesleyan Methodist (1832) and Church of England (1847); the Wesleyan Methodist Chapel at Bradfield Green has closed. In 1840, a school was built at Bradfield Green; it had over a hundred pupils in 1900, but has since closed. The parish suffered bombing during the Second World War, with two fatalities.

== Governance ==
Minshull Vernon is administered by Minshull Vernon and District Parish Council, jointly with Leighton and Woolstanwood. Of 22 parish councillors, seven represent Minshull Vernon. From 1974 the civil parish was served by Crewe and Nantwich Borough Council, which was succeeded on 1 April 2009 by the unitary authority of Cheshire East. Minshull Vernon falls in the parliamentary constituency of Chester South and Eddisbury, which has been represented since the 2024 general election by Aphra Brandreth of the Conservative Party. It was previously part of the Eddisbury constituency, which since its establishment in 1983 had been held by the Conservative MPs Alastair Goodlad (1983–99), Stephen O'Brien (1999–2015), Antoinette Sandbach (2015–19) and Edward Timpson (2019–24).

== Geography, transport and economy ==
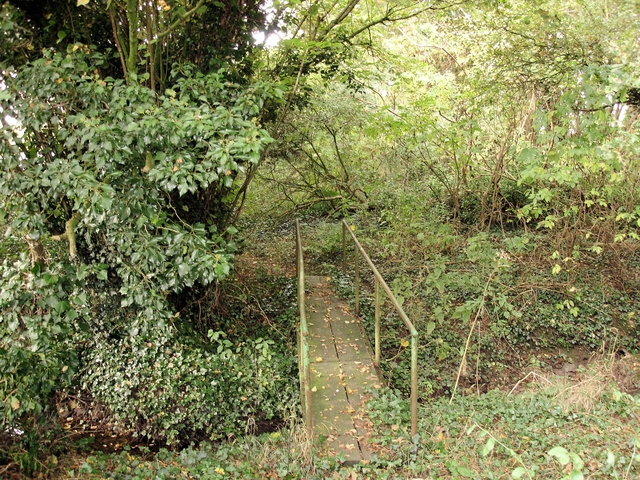
Brook in Worsley Covert

The civil parish has a total area of 2,736 acres (1,107 ha). The area is relatively flat, with an average elevation of around 50 metres. The civil parish is largely rural, with the major land use being agricultural, predominantly pasture. A short stretch of the River Weaver forms part of the northern boundary of the parish and Hoggins Brook runs along its eastern boundary; several unnamed brooks also run through the parish, and numerous small meres and ponds are scattered across the area. The parish contains several areas of woodland, including Burnt Covert, Larch Wood, Spring Plantation, Worsley Covert and parts of Polestead Wood and Weaver Bank Wood. Two small areas in the north west and south west of the parish, together with the western parish boundary, fall within the Weaver Valley Area of Special County Value. An underground gas storage plant is located south of Hole House at SJ69636056.

The A530 (Middlewich Road) runs north–south through the parish; Brookhouse Lane/Eardswick Lane loops round from the A530 near Walley's Green to rejoin it near Bradfield Green. Moss Lane and the B5076 (Flowers Lane) run east and southeast, respectively, from the A530 at Bradfield Green towards Barrows Green. Cross Lane runs west from Brookhouse Lane/Eardswick Lane to Church Minshull.

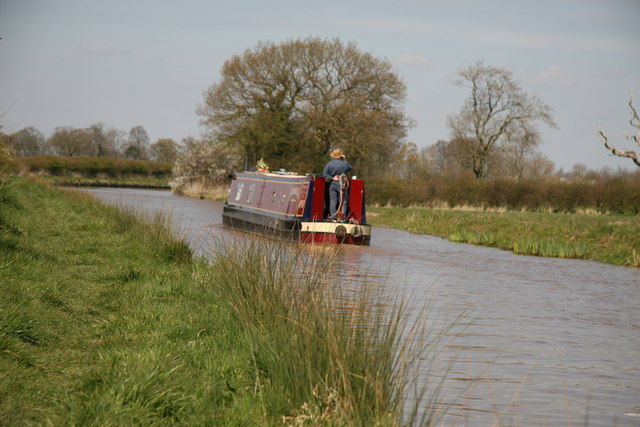
Shropshire Union Canal

The Middlewich Branch of the Shropshire Union Canal runs through the north-west of the parish, and forms the majority of the western boundary. Cross Lane crosses the canal via Minshullhill Bridge. The Crewe–Winsford railway line runs north–south through the parish to the east of the A530. The Weaver Way follows the Shropshire Union towpath, and the Crewe and Nantwich Circular Walk loops through the parish, in part also following the towpath.

== Demography ==
In 2006, the total population of the civil parish was estimated as 240. The 2001 census recorded a population of 224, in 94 households. This is around 60% of the population of 1851; the historical population figures were 357 (1801), 375 (1851), 302 (1901) and 267 (1951).

== Places of worship ==
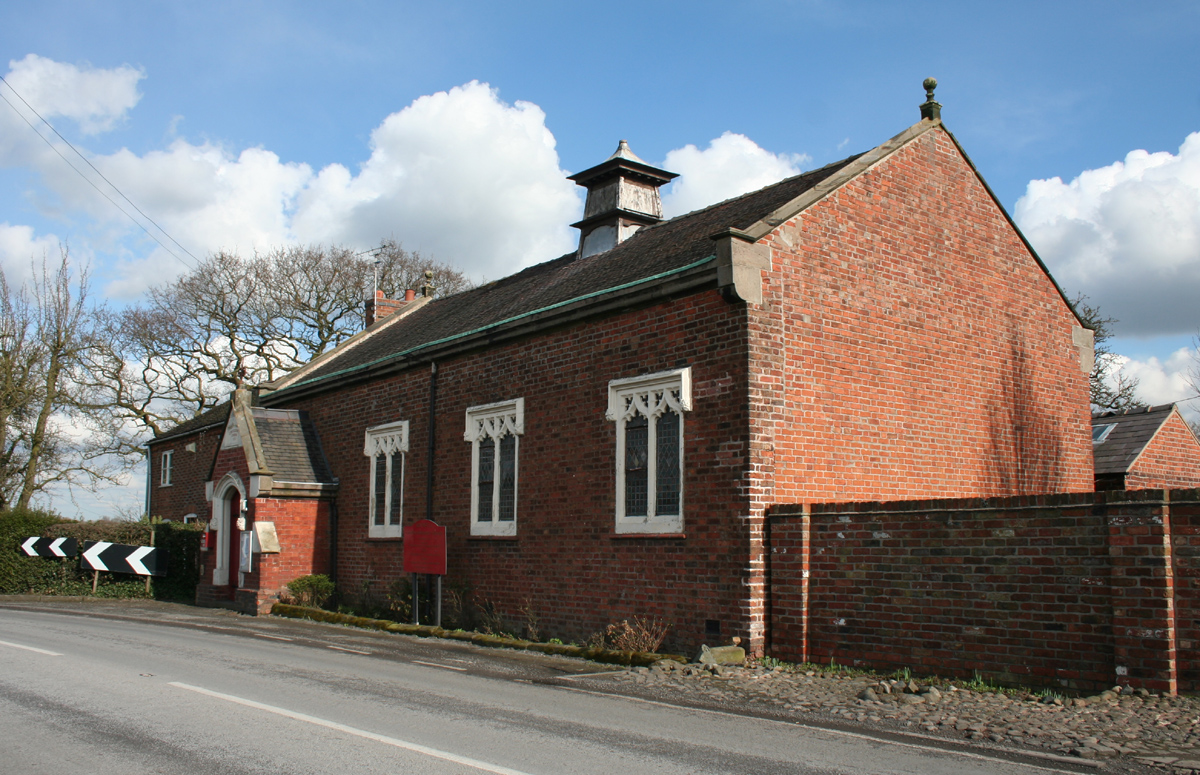
Minshull Vernon United Reformed Church

Minshull Vernon United Reformed Church is located at the junction of Cross Lane, Brookhouse Lane and Eardswick Lane. Originally a Congregational Chapel, the grade-II-listed church dates from 1809 to 1810 and was substantially altered in around 1880. It is in brown brick with Victorian stained-glass windows featuring ogee tracery; a single original arched window with "Y" tracery survives in the north gable.

The Church of England parish church of St Peter, Leighton-cum-Minshull Vernon, on Middlewich Road north of Bradfield Green was founded in 1840. The present rock-faced building by John Matthews dates from 1847 to 1849 and has a bell-cote and lancet windows; it is listed at grade II.

== Other landmarks ==
Newfield Hall on Middlewich Road in Walley's Green is a red-brick mansion on a double pile plan which dates from the early 19th century; it is listed at grade II. The west front is flanked by stone elephants bearing howdahs, which are believed to have come from Adderley Hall near Market Drayton in Shropshire. A small red-brick summerhouse in the grounds, thought to have originally been a privy, has a slate roof topped with a ball finial. It dates from the same period as the hall, and is also listed at grade II.

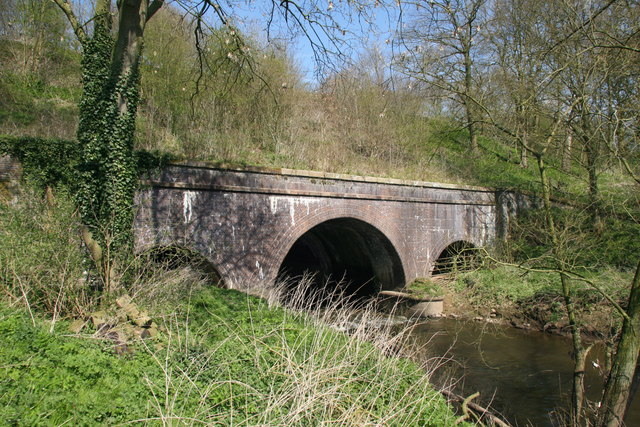
Shropshire Union aqueduct

Hoolgrave Manor on Eardswick Lane is a grade-II-listed hall, now a farmhouse, in brown brick on a U-shaped plan. Dating from the late 17th century, it features brick pilasters at the corners and a central slightly projecting bay with an oriel window and topped with a pediment.

Eardswick Hall on Eardswick Lane is a grade-II-listed farmhouse which dates from 1849; the farmhouse and associated farm buildings enclose a courtyard. The farmhouse, in Jacobean style, is in red brick with blue-brick diapering and features cast-iron lozenge windows and decorative roof tiles. The farm buildings also have lozenge windows, as well as elaborately patterned ventilation holes. The existing farmhouse was built on the site of a 16th-century moated hall, demolished in 1849, which was partly in stone and partly timber framed; the west, north and south arms of the moat survive.

Several other farmhouses within the parish are also listed at grade II:

- The Dairy Farm House
- Park House at Walley's Green
- The Pines at Bradfield Green
- Woodhouse Farm House

The first three are all on Middlewich Road, the fourth on Brookhouse Lane. All are in red brick and date from the early or mid-19th century, although The Pines also has a rear wing which dates from the early 17th century.

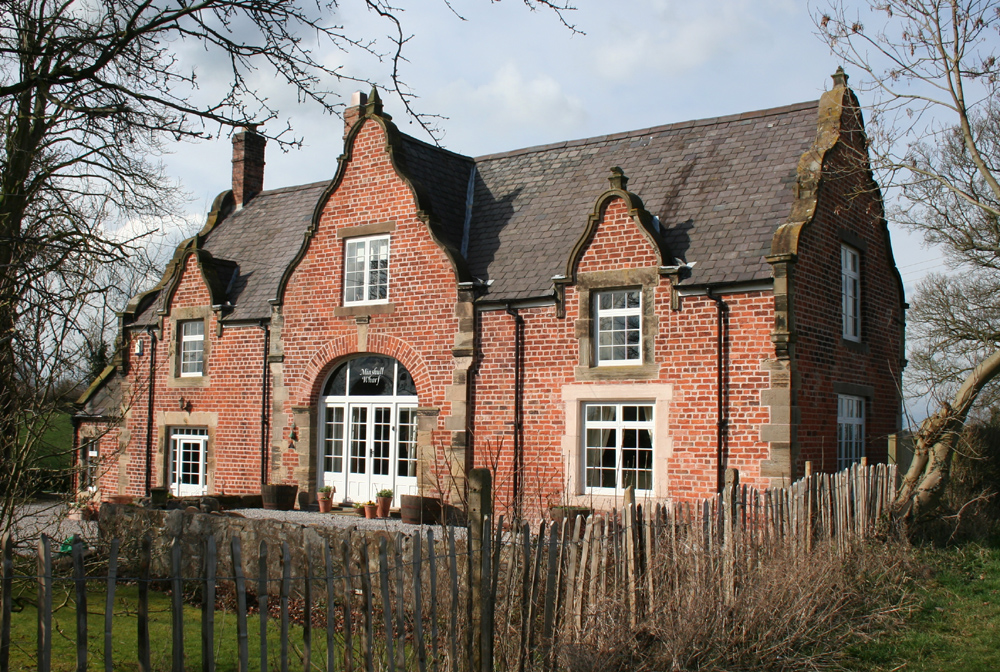
The Wharf

The Wharf on Cross Lane, adjacent to the Shropshire Union Canal, is a grade-II-listed former canal warehouse and cottage which dates from around 1830 and is attributed to Thomas Telford. In red brick, it is in late 17th-century style and has three shaped gables to the main face, single shaped gables to the two ends, and a carriageway arch.

Two aqueducts carrying the canal over the River Weaver are listed at grade II. Five canal bridges are also grade II listed: Eardswick Bridge, Eardswick Hall Bridge, Hollingshead Bridge, Minshullhill Bridge and bridge number 18. The aqueducts and bridges all date from 1827 to 1833; all are in brick with stone bands and copings, and all except Minshullhill Bridge are from designs by Telford.

A double moated site with an associated fishpond is located at SJ68906029; the site dates from the medieval period and is a scheduled ancient monument.

A war memorial in Bradfield Green (at SJ679587) commemorates those who died in the First World War from Minshull Vernon and the adjacent parish of Leighton.

A stone cross erected in 1897 to mark Queen Victoria's Diamond Jubilee stands at the junction of Middlewich Road and Brookhouse Lane in Walley's Green.

The Coach and Horses public house is on Middlewich Road at Bradfield Green.

== Education ==
There are no educational facilities in Minshull Vernon. For primary education, the northern half of the civil parish falls within the catchment area of Wimboldsley Community Primary School in Wimboldsley, while the southern half mainly falls within the catchment area of Warmingham Church of England Primary School in Warmingham, there are two primary schools in a small area in the south-east corner in Mablins Lane Community Primary School and Leighton Primary School both in Leighton. For secondary education, the northern half of the parish falls within the catchment area of Middlewich High School in Middlewich, and the southern half within that of Sir William Stanier School in Crewe.

== See also ==
- Listed buildings in Minshull Vernon
