= Leighton, Cheshire =

Civil parish in Cheshire, England

Coordinates: 53.116°N 2.457°W

Leighton
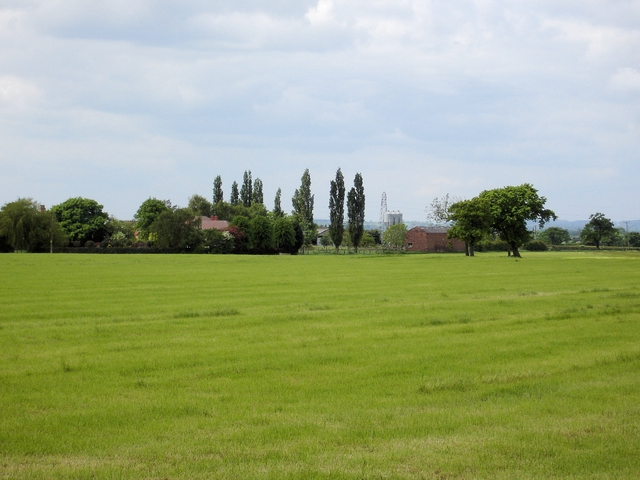
- Farmland near Red Hall

- Location within Cheshire
- Population: 4,883 (2011)
- OS grid reference: SJ694577
- Civil parish: Leighton
- Unitary authority: Cheshire East
- Ceremonial county: Cheshire
- Region: North West
- Country: England
- Sovereign state: United Kingdom
- Post town: CREWE
- Postcode district: CW1
- Dialling code: 01270
- Police: Cheshire
- Fire: Cheshire
- Ambulance: North West
- UK Parliament: Crewe and Nantwich

Leighton is a scattered settlement and civil parish in the unitary authority of Cheshire East and the ceremonial county of Cheshire, England, which lies immediately north west of Crewe. The parish also includes the village of Barrows Green (at SJ687579), which lies on the northern outskirts of Crewe, 1½ miles from the centre. Nearby villages include Bradfield Green and Worleston. The total population of the civil parish was 4,883 at the 2011 Census.

== History ==
A Roman road runs through the civil parish. A Primitive Methodist chapel was built in Leighton in 1841; it closed in 1899.

== Governance ==
Leighton is administered by Minshull Vernon and District Parish Council, jointly with Minshull Vernon and Woolstanwood. Of 22 parish councillors, eleven represent Leighton (eight from Leighton Urban and three from Leighton Rural). From 1974 the civil parish was served by Crewe and Nantwich Borough Council, which was succeeded on 1 April 2009 by the unitary authority of Cheshire East. Leighton falls in the parliamentary constituency of Crewe and Nantwich, which has been represented by Connnor Naismith since 2024, after being represented by Kieran Mullan (2019-24), Laura Smith (2017–19), Edward Timpson (2008–17), Gwyneth Dunwoody (1983–2008).

== Geography and transport ==
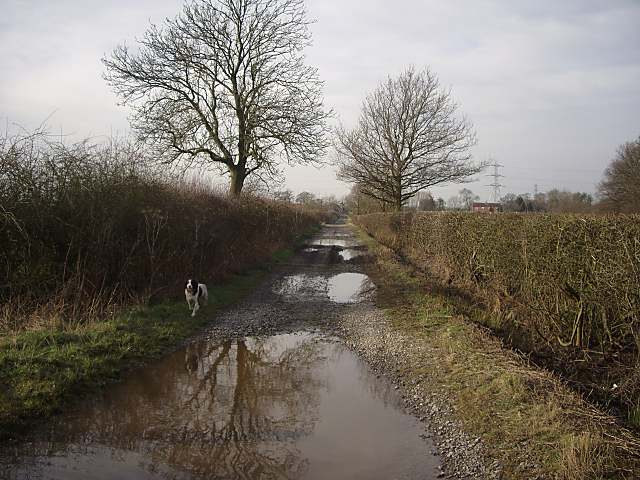
Crewe and Nantwich Circular Walk in Leighton

Much of the area is relatively flat, with an average elevation of around 50 metres. The land slopes downwards in the west to the River Weaver, which forms the western boundary of the civil parish, and in the south to Leighton Brook, which forms part of the southern boundary. The western part of the civil parish is predominantly rural, with the major land use being agricultural; a small area of woodland, Red Hall Wood, is located at SJ667580. Urban development is concentrated around Barrows Green in the south east, adjacent to the town of Crewe. A small part of the north-western corner of the parish falls within the Weaver Valley Area of Special County Value.

The A530 runs north–south through the parish and the B5076 runs south-eastwards from Bradfield Green. The Crewe–Chester railway line runs east–west just to the south of the parish and the Crewe–Winsford line runs north–south along its western boundary. The Middlewich branch of the Shropshire Union Canal runs to the north. The Crewe and Nantwich Circular Walk runs through the eastern part of the civil parish.

== Demography ==
According to the 2001 census, the parish had a population of 4863 in 1666 households. The historical population figures were 200 (1801), 190 (1851), 126 (1901) and 138 (1951).

== Landmarks ==
Leighton Hospital, one of two hospitals in the Mid Cheshire Hospitals NHS Trust, is located on the A530 (at SJ681579). A large general hospital, it provides accident and emergency services covering a wide area of South Cheshire.
