= Boer War Memorial, Crewe =

Grade II listed war memorial in the United kingdom

Coordinates: 53.09695°N 2.46846°W

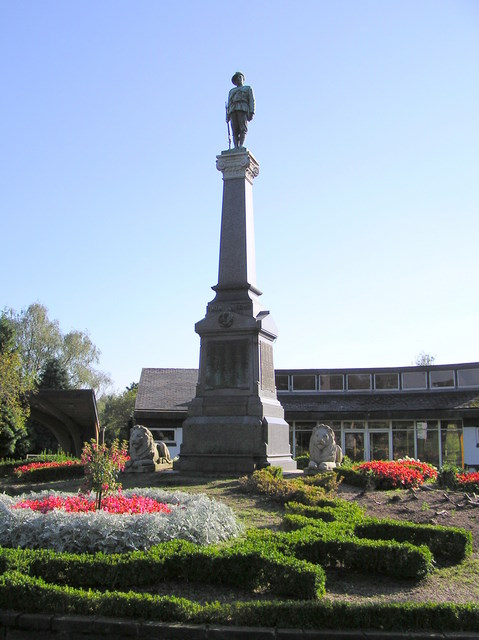
Boer War Memorial

The Boer War Memorial, also known as the South African War Memorial, stands in a prominent position in Queens Park, Crewe, England. It was erected in memory of local soldiers who had served or fallen in the Boer War, and consists of a bronze statue of soldier in uniform standing on a column on a stone plinth. The monument was unveiled in 1903, and contains plaques with the names of those who were lost in the war. It is recorded in the National Heritage List for England as a designated Grade II listed building.

== History ==
Shortly after the end of the Boer War in May 1902, the citizens of Crewe decided to erect a memorial to the soldiers from the town who had fallen in the conflict. It has been stated that a higher proportion of men from Crewe than in any other British town served in the war. A committee named the Crewe South African Volunteers' and Reservists' Memorial Fund Committee was established, which represented local volunteers rather than regular serving men. The committee asked the Crewe Borough Council for a site in Queens Park, and the council gave them the most prominent position in the park. At the time a bandstand stood there, but this was demolished. The money for the memorial was raised by public subscription. It is thought that the London & North Western Railway Company gave nothing, although they had been generous to the town in other ways, including donating the park. The total donations amounted to £1,050. The memorial was designed and made by Joseph Whitehead and Sons of Westminster. It was unveiled on 8 August 1903 by Lord Stalbridge, chairman of the railway company.

== Description ==
The memorial consists of a bronze statue of a soldier dressed in the uniform of the period standing on a marble column on a stone pedestal. The whole memorial, including the statue, is about 9 metres (29.5 ft) high. The soldier is standing to attention, holding a rifle, and dressed in what was known as "foreign service dress". This includes a slouch hat, a bandolier belt, a pouch, and a water bottle. The pedestal is in Aberdeen granite, and the column is in grey marble with a sandstone cap. The base is square, and carries a chamfered plinth with a pediment at the top on each side. From this rises a marble column with an Ionic cap. On each side of the plinth are bronze memorial plaques carrying lists of names. On the north pediment are the arms of the former borough, the motto "Never Behind", and the date 1899–1902.

Originally at the base of the memorial was a bronze model of a locomotive named King Edward VII, which had been designed by Francis Webb. The model had been made by P. H. Lightfoot, and it stood on rails with 19 sleepers. The model was 1.2 metres (4 ft) long and weighed over ten tons. It has since been removed and replaced by two stone lions.

== Appraisal ==
The monument was designated as a Grade II listed building on 14 June 1984. Grade II is the lowest of the three grades of listing and is applied to "buildings of national importance and special interest".

== See also ==
- Listed buildings in Crewe
