= Verdun tree =

The Verdun trees are oak and horse chestnut trees planted in the United Kingdom in the aftermath of the First World War. Acorns and chestnuts were collected from trees on the battlefield at Verdun and sent to England to be distributed and planted as war memorials. Some were sold by the London and North Western Railway in 1917 to raise money for the War Seal Foundation, founded by Oswald Stoll. Others may have been brought back to the UK by Field Marshal Lord French.

Queen Mary planted a Verdun oak on the Sandringham Estate in Norfolk on 28 January 1920. Two Verdun oaks were planted in the Royal Botanic Gardens, Kew on Peace Day, 19 July 1919; one remains, but the other was removed in 2014.

Other Verdun oaks remain in:

- the War Memorial Park, Coventry and in Spencer Park, Coventry
- Queens Park, Crewe, Cheshire (probable)
- Pembridge, Herefordshire
- Southwold, Suffolk;
- Grange Park, Leominster
- Beaumont Park, Huddersfield, where there are two examples
- Corby Castle, Carlisle
- Forbury Gardens, Reading
- near Hale War Memorial, in Surrey

There are also Verdun horse chestnuts in Beaumont Park, Huddersfield, and one horse chestnut – reportedly from a group of twenty – was planted in St Albans in January 1976.

There are believed to be many other Verdun trees whose locations are not certain, including trees in Walpole Park, Ealing, and in Whitehaven and Swansea.

Some Verdun trees have been removed, including one at Upton Lawn, Cheshire and one at Moorcourt Estate, Pembridge. An original Verdun oak tree in the Garden of Remembrance, Lichfield was later replaced by a tree grown from one of its acorns.

With the original trees approaching 100 years old, the Woodland Trust launched a project in 2016 to grow a second generation of Verdun trees.
