= Lyceum Theatre, Crewe =

Lyceum Theatre
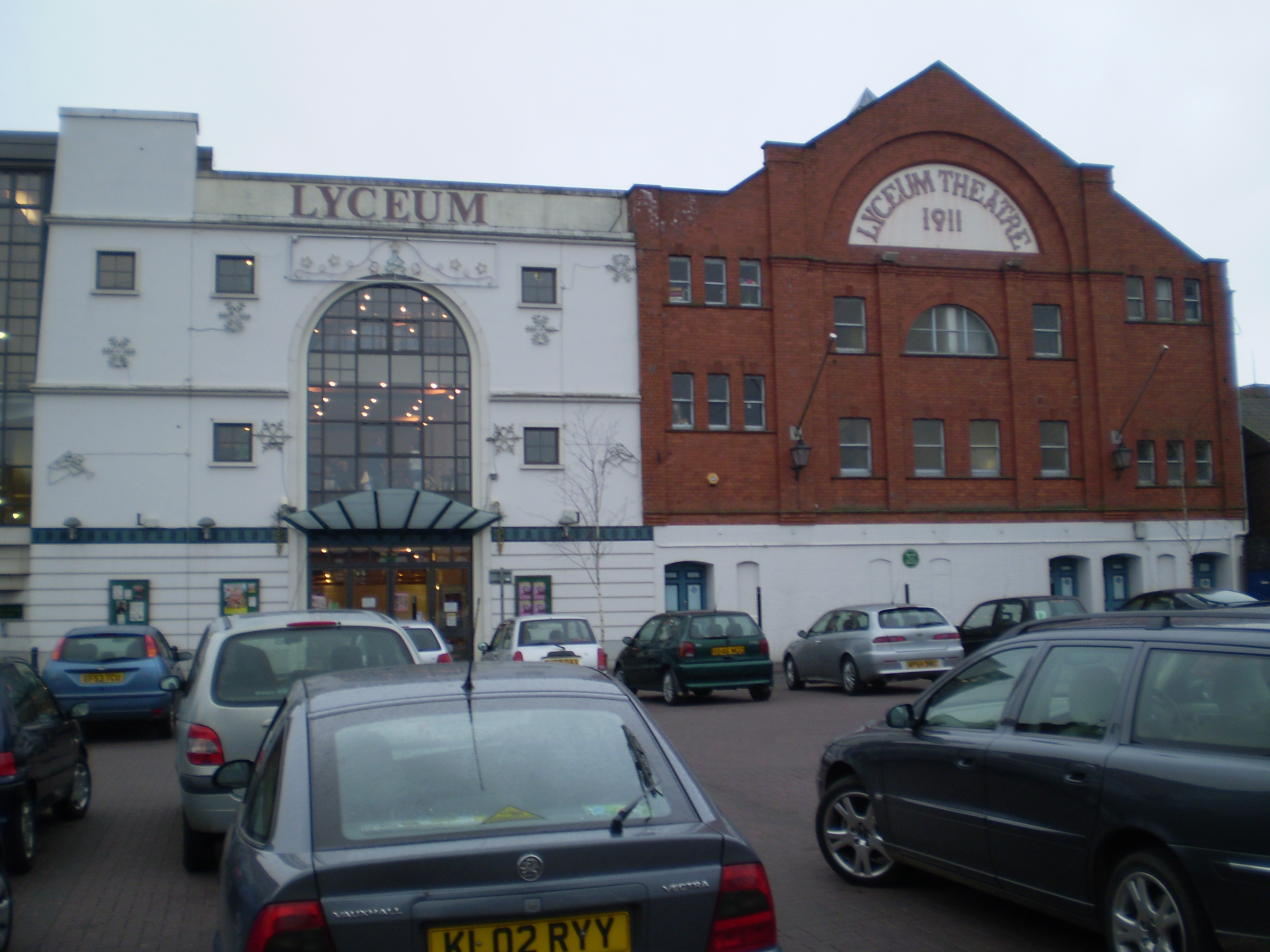
- Lyceum Theatre

- Location in Cheshire
- 53.09763°N 2.44647°W
- Location: Heath Street, Crewe, Cheshire, England

History
- Built: 1887; 139 years ago
- Rebuilt: 1911; 115 years ago

Site notes
- Architect: Albert Winstanley
- Governing body: Crewe and Nantwich; Borough Council

Listed Building – Grade II
- Official name: The Lyceum Theatre, Crewe
- Designated: 6 July 1976
- Reference no.: 1138678

The Lyceum Theatre is an Edwardian theatre in Heath Street, Crewe, Cheshire, England. It originated as a converted Roman Catholic Church in 1876. The church was replaced in 1887 by a purpose-built theatre, which burnt down in 1910. The theatre was rebuilt the following year, and was refurbished in 1994. It continues in use as a theatre, as of 2022 it is managed by Trafalgar Theatres. The theatre is constructed in brick, and adjacent to it is a block containing the entrance and offices. Its interior contains decorated plasterwork.

== History ==
The theatre stands on the site of a former Roman Catholic Church that had been built to serve Irish immigrants working on the local railway. In 1876 the congregation moved into a larger church in the town. The site was acquired by Thomas Cliffe, a local farmer, and he gave permission for Henry Taylor, a local printer, to convert the church into a theatre. Taylor wanted to have a "proper" theatre on the site and later built the New Lyceum Theatre, which opened on 21 November 1887. It cost £5,000 (equivalent to £570,000 in 2025) and seated 1,250 people. It was re-fitted in 1908 and changed its name to the Opera House. On 11 March 1910 the theatre was destroyed in a fire, and it was decided to rebuild it on the same site. The new theatre was designed by Albert Winstanley, it seated 850, and opened on 6 October 1911. In the early 1930s it was acquired by Terence Byron, who also owned theatres elsewhere in the country. It was bought in 1955 by Crewe Borough Council who formed a management trust in 1964. It operated, with a varying degree of success, as a repertory theatre. During this time actors and actresses who later achieved fame gained experience in the theatre; these included Glenda Jackson, Richard Beckinsale, Judy Loe, and Lynda Bellingham. In 1982 the management of the theatre moved back from the trust to the Crewe and Nantwich Borough Council. The council redecorated the theatre in 1992, and installed new seating, and in 1994 £1.5 million was spent in rebuilding the facilities in the front of the house and remodelling the gallery.

== Architecture ==
The theatre is recorded in the National Heritage List for England as a Grade II listed building, having been designated on 6 July 1976. It is constructed in Accrington-type brick with a slate roof. It is three storeys high and has a gabled façade, divided into five unequal bays. To its left is a two-storey, four-bay building incorporating the entrance and containing offices. Inside the theatre is an auditorium with a dress circle, gallery and boxes. The front of these is decorated with plasterwork, including cartouches and reclining figures. There is more plasterwork decoration on the proscenium arch and the ceiling rose.

== Present day ==
The theatre arranges a regular programme of plays and shows and the theatre also arranges exhibitions.

== See also ==
- Listed buildings in Crewe
- Parr Hall, Warrington
- The Brindley, Runcorn
- Storyhouse, Chester
