= Queens Park, Crewe =

Park in Crewe, Cheshire, England

Coordinates: 53.097°N 2.470°W

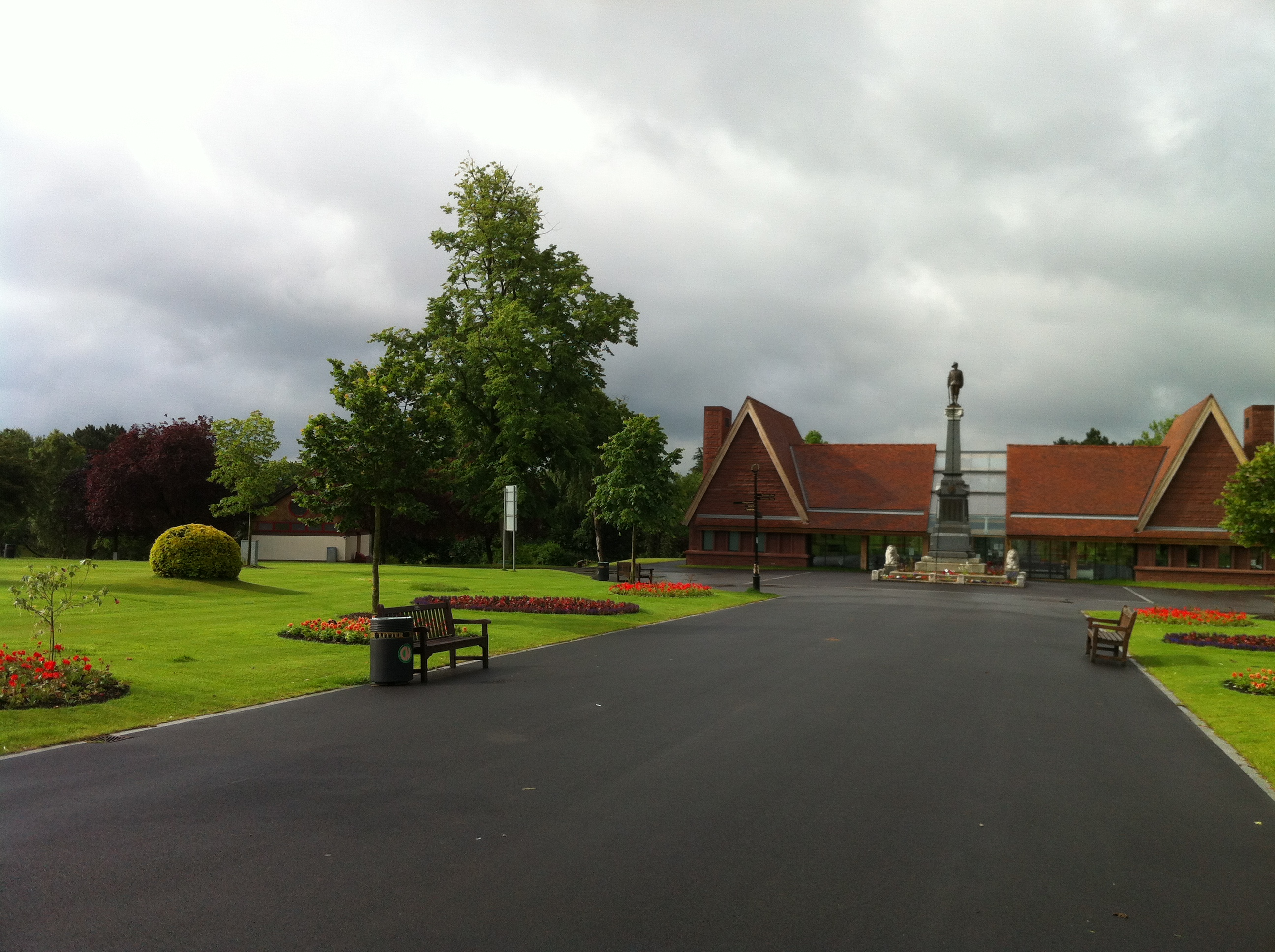
Queens Park looking towards the pavilion

Queens Park in Crewe, Cheshire, is a 44.5 acre (18ha) Grade II* listed public park opened in 1887, little changed from its original plan.

== History ==
The park was laid out by railway engineer Francis Webb, Richard Moon, mayor of Crewe in 1888, and garden designer Edward Kemp.

A story that the park is a product of 1880s railway politics when the London & North Western Railway bought the land and donated it to the town to prevent the Great Western Railway from building a railway line through it is almost certainly untrue.

From 2014 the park underwent a major £6.5 million restoration that included a new children's playground, a new café and bowls pavilion, and significant reconstruction work to bridges and footpaths.

The Friends of Queens Park help to raise money for events held in the park. The Friends are a community group who represent the park, they also raise money to put on events in the Park and to implement new ideas.

== Features ==
The park is popular with Crewe residents and features the largest lake in the area, which also has boats for hire. Other prominent features of the park include a Grade II listed Victorian clock tower, two Grade II listed lodges at the entrance from Victoria Avenue, a man-made waterfall, a large playground, and several statues and fountains. At the centre of the park is the Grade II listed Boer War Memorial. Other memorials include one to the first Gulf War, and Verdun trees.

== Sport ==
A parkrun takes place at the park each Saturday morning at 9 am. It began on 17 February 2018.

== Gallery ==
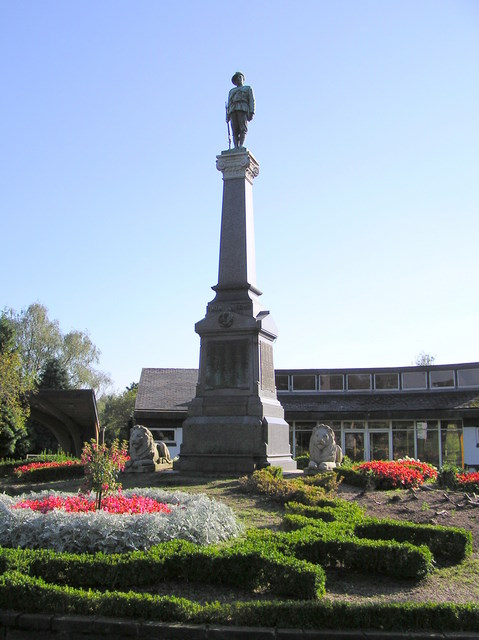
Boer War Memorial

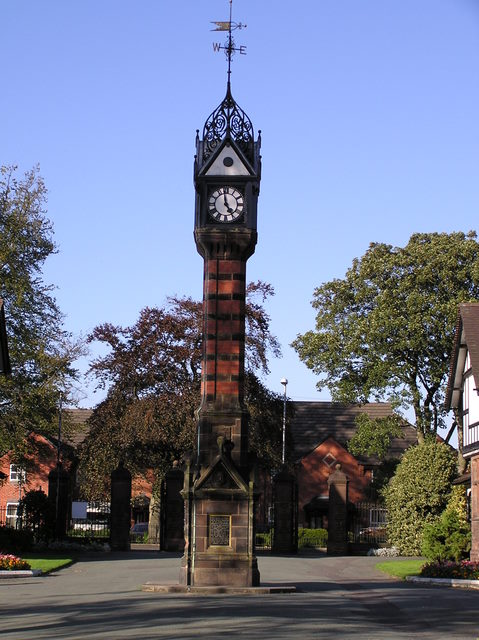
Clock Tower

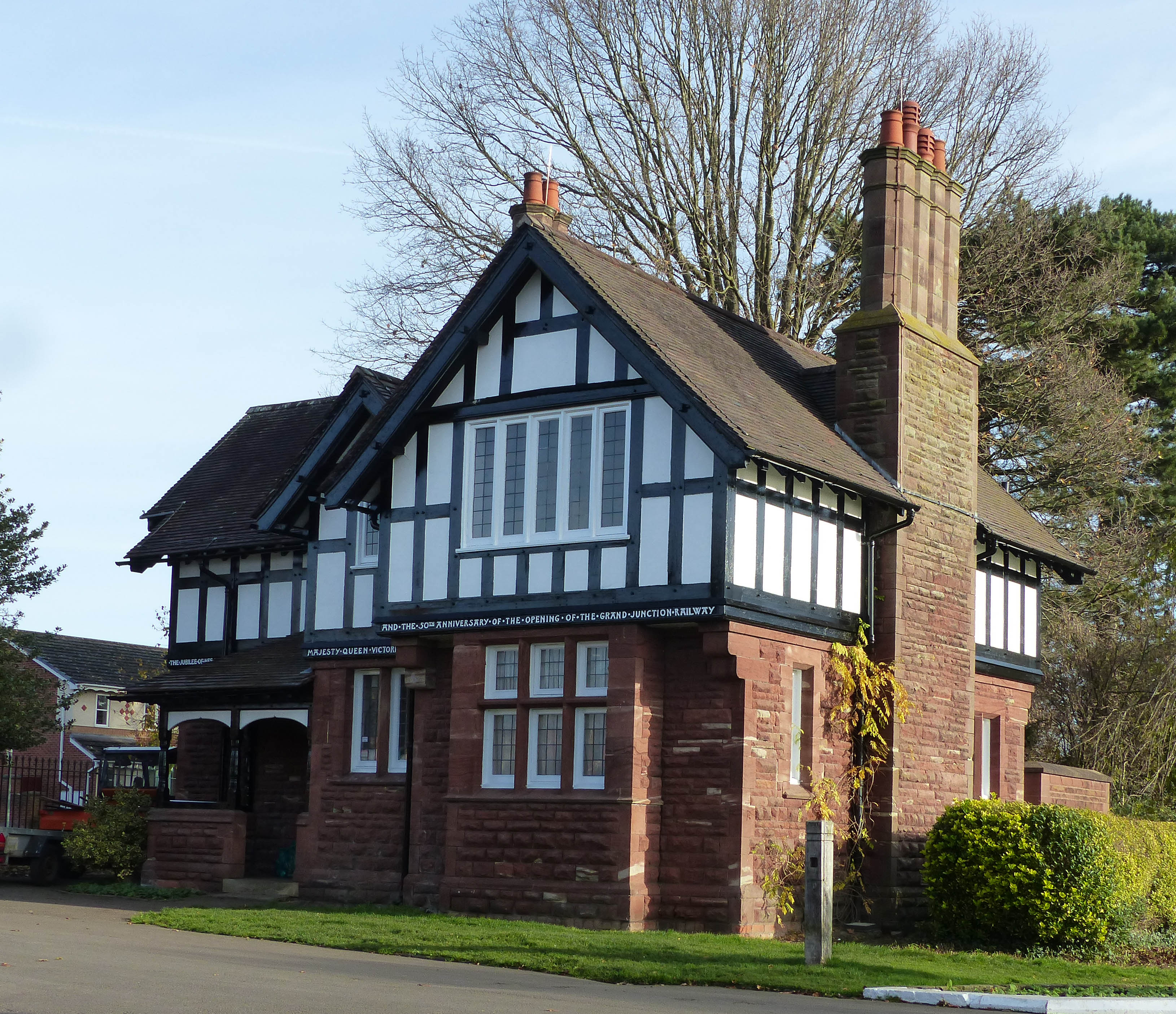
East Lodge

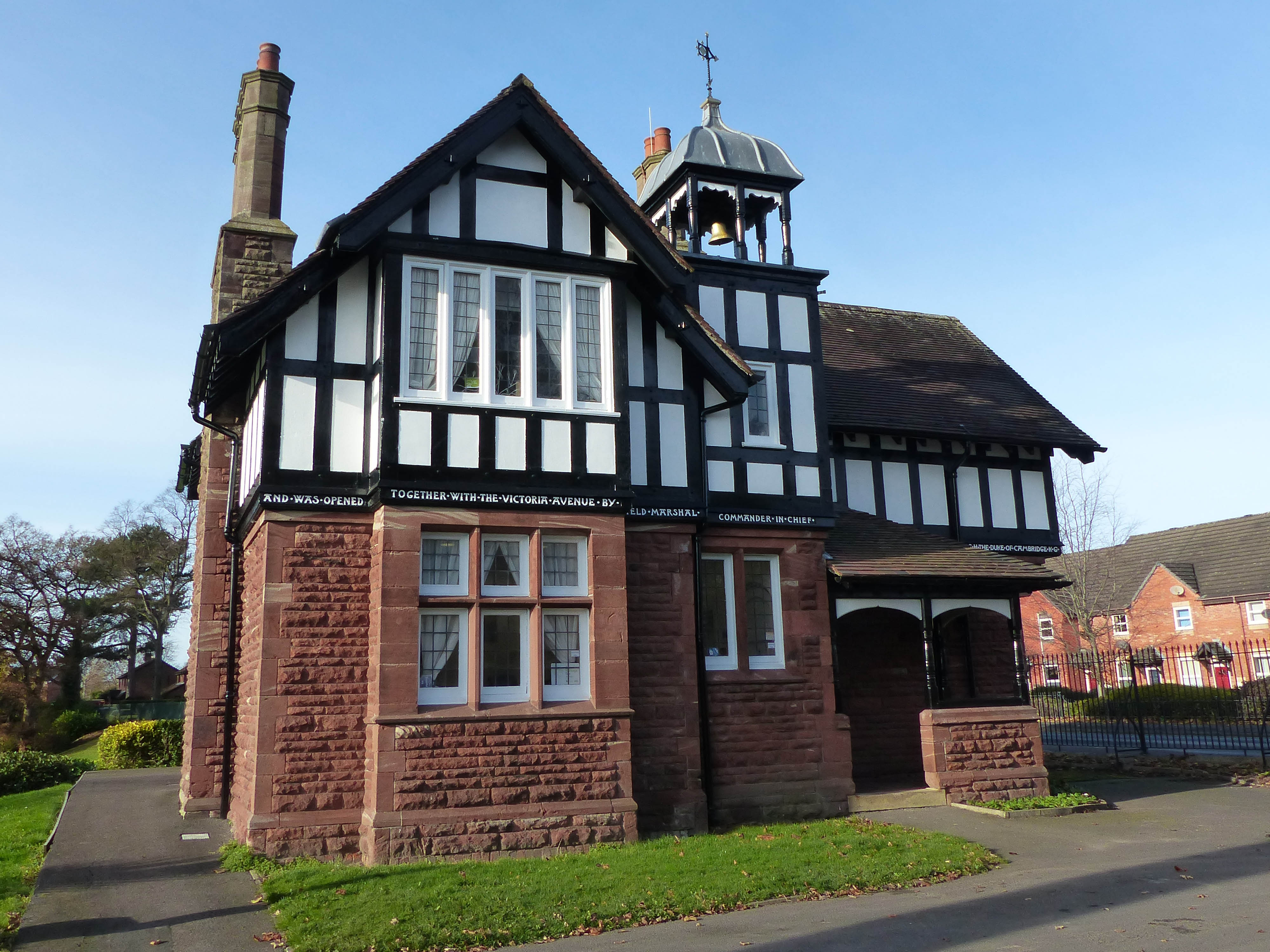
West Lodge

== See also ==
- Listed buildings in Crewe
- List of parks and open spaces in Cheshire
