= Clock Tower, Crewe =

Grade II listed clock tower in Queen's Park, England

Clock Tower in Queen's Park
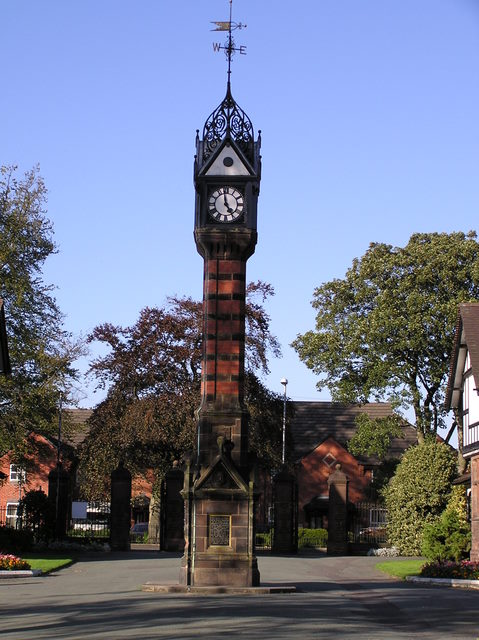
- Clock Tower in Queen's Park

- Location within Cheshire
- 53.09843°N 2.46761°W
- Location: Queen's Park, Crewe, Cheshire

History
- Built: 1888
- Built for: London and North Western Railway Company

Listed Building – Grade II
- Official name: Clock Tower in Queen's Park
- Designated: 13 June 1984
- Reference no.: 1136226

The Clock Tower stands near the north entrance to Queen's Park, Crewe, in Cheshire, England. The park was given to the residents of the town by the London and North Western Railway Company, and the clock tower was paid for by its employees. It was unveiled on the same day the park was officially opened in 1888. The tower is built in sandstone and brick, and contains medallions with the heads of Queen Victoria and officials of the company. It is recorded in the National Heritage List for England as a designated Grade II listed building.

== History ==
Queen's Park was given to the people of Crewe for their recreation and relaxation by the London and North Western Railway Company, the major employers in the town. It was designed by F. W. Webb, the chief mechanical engineer of the company, together with Edward Kemp. The clock tower was paid for by the employees of the company, and was designed by John Brooke. The park was formally opened to the public on 9 June 1888 by the Duke of Cambridge. On the same day the clock tower was unveiled by James Middleton, who had been an engine driver of the company for 50 years. The clock itself was given and installed by a Mr Blackhurst, a local clockmaker. Originally the tower contained two drinking fountains with brass cups, and a barometer, but these are no longer present.

== Description ==
The clock tower is about 10 metres (33 ft) high. The sandstone plinth stands on a square base. On the sides of the plinth are rectangular panels, the south panel having an inscription and the date. On top of each side of the plinth is an equilateral pediment with a ball flower finial. Each pediment contains a medallion depicting a head; on the north side it is that of Queen Victoria, and on the other sides are the heads of members of the railway board. From the plinth, the tower rises, first in sandstone, then in brick with decorative bands. At the top is a projecting cap supporting the clock. This has four faces, each framed in timber. Above each clock face is an equilateral pediment. On the top of the tower is elaborate wrought iron work supporting a weathervane.

The inscription on the tower reads as follows.

THIS FOUNTAIN WAS ERECTED BY THE VOLUNTARY SUBSCRIPTIONS OF THE SERVANTS OF ALL DEPARTMENTS OF THE L&NWRCO AS A TOKEN OF THEIR APPRECIATION OF THE GENEROSITY OF THEIR BOARD OF DIRECTORS (SIR R. MOON BART. CHAIRMAN) IN PRESENTING THIS PARK TO THE TOWN OF CREWE AND WAS UNVEILED JUNE 9TH 1888 BY JAMES MIDDLETON WHO COMPLETED HIS FIFTIETH YEAR AS ENGINE DRIVER FOR THE COMPANY IN THE JUBILEE YEAR OF HER MAJESTY'S REIGN 1887

The clock tower was designated as a Grade II listed building on 14 June 1984. Grade II is the lowest of the three grades of listing and is applied to "buildings of national importance and special interest".

== See also ==
- Listed buildings in Crewe
