= Listed buildings in Minshull Vernon =

Minshull Vernon is a civil parish in Cheshire East, England. It contains 17 buildings that are recorded in the National Heritage List for England as designated listed buildings, all of which are at Grade II. This grade is the lowest of the three gradings given to listed buildings and is applied to "buildings of national importance and special interest". Apart from the village of Minshull Vernon and the settlement of Bradfield Green, the parish is rural. Passing through the parish is the Middlewich Branch of the Shropshire Union Canal, and six of the listed buildings are associated with it, five bridges and an aqueduct. Otherwise the listed buildings comprise farmhouses, houses and associated structures, a war memorial, and two churches.

Name and location	Photograph	Date	Notes
Bradfield House; 53.12828°N 2.47700°W		Early 17th century	The farmhouse is in brick with slate roofs, and has two storeys with an attic. The oldest part is the rear wing, with the larger front wing added in the early 19th century. The rear wing contains casement windows. The front wing is in three bays, and has an arched entrance with a fanlight and a keystone. The windows in this wing are sashes with wedge lintels.
Hoolgrave Manor; 53.12671°N 2.49083°W	—	Late 17th century	A brick farmhouse with slate roofs. It has a U-shaped plan, is in two storeys with an attic, and has a front of three bays. The central bay projects forward and is pedimented with a former entrance replaced by an oriel window. The other windows are casements. At the corners of the house are brick quoins. The entrance is in the east wing, and has a doorcase with pilasters and a pediment.
Minshull Vernon United Reformed Church; 53.14189°N 2.48340°W		1809	This was built as a Congregational church. It is in brick with a tiled roof, and has four bays, one of which contains a gabled porch. The windows on the side of the church are mullioned, and one window on the north face contains Y-tracery. On the gables of the church are ball finials.
Newfield Hall; 53.15189°N 2.47445°W	—	Early 19th century	A brick house with a slate roof, in a double-pile plan, with two storeys. There are four bays on the west front, three on the north, and four on the south bays. There is a single-story porch with a stone cornice, parapet, and ball finials. The windows are sashes. On the south side is a pair of French windows. At the corners of the west front are stone elephants with howdahs.
Summer house, Newfield Hall; 53.15159°N 2.47462°W	—	Early 19th century	The summer house is in brick and has a hipped slate roof with a ball finial. It contains a door, a casement window with moulded pilasters, roundels and a frieze.
Woodhouse Farm House; 53.14875°N 2.47938°W	—	Early 19th century	The farmhouse is in brick with a slate roof. It is in two storeys with an attic, and has a three-bay front, the central bay projecting forward. The doorway has a doorcase with pilasters and a fanlight. The windows are sashes with stone sills.
Aqueduct; 53.12672°N 2.50263°W		1827–33	The aqueduct carries the Middlewich Branch of the Shropshire Union Canal over the River Weaver, for which the engineer was Thomas Telford. It is built in brick with stone bands and copings, and consists of a circular arch flanked by small arches for flood relief. At the sides of the arches are piers with niches, and there are curving wing walls.
Bridge No. 18; 53.15562°N 2.48055°W		1827–33	An accommodation bridge over the Middlewich Branch of the Shropshire Union Canal, for which the engineer was Thomas Telford. It is built in brick with a stone band and copings, and consists of a single basket arch with a solid parapet and piers.
Eardswick Bridge; 53.13538°N 2.49369°W		1827–33	This is bridge No. 12 over the Middlewich Branch of the Shropshire Union Canal. It is an accommodation bridge in brick with a stone band and copings. The bridge consists of a single basket arch with a parapet and piers.
Eardswick Hall Bridge; 53.13819°N 2.49298°W		1827–33	This is bridge No. 13 over the Middlewich Branch of the Shropshire Union Canal. It is an accommodation bridge in brick with a stone band and copings. The bridge consists of a single basket arch with a solid parapet and piers.
Hollingshead Bridge; 53.14875°N 2.48536°W		1827–33	This is bridge No. 16 over the Middlewich Branch of the Shropshire Union Canal, for which the engineer was Thomas Telford. It is an accommodation bridge in brick with a stone band and copings. The bridge consists of a single skewed basket arch with a solid parapet and piers.
Minshullhill Bridge; 53.14238°N 2.49270°W		c.1830	This is bridge No. 14 over the Middlewich Branch of the Shropshire Union Canal and carries Cross Lane over it. The bridge is built in brick with a stone band and copings, and consists of a single skewed arch with a stone parapet and end piers.
Minshull Hall; 53.13646°N 2.47192°W	—	Early to mid-19th century	A brick farmhouse with a slate roof, it is in two storeys and has a three-bay front. Three steps lead up to an arched entrance containing a doorcase with pilasters and a fanlight. The windows are sashes.
Park House; 53.14763°N 2.46098°W	—	Early to mid-19th century	A brick farmhouse with a slate roof, it is in two storeys and has a three-bay front. The doorway has a transom carried on consoles, and a semicircular arch with a fanlight. Some of the windows are sashes.
St Peter's Church; 53.13090°N 2.47730°W		1847–49	This was a Commissioners' church designed by John Matthews, and built in stone with slate roofs. It consists of a nave with a north porch, and a chancel with a north transept and a south vestry. There is a double bellcote on the west gable, and most of the windows are lancets.
Eardswick Hall; 53.13576°N 2.48976°W		Mid-19th century	The farmhouse is in red brick with blue brick diapering and tiled roofs, and is in Tudor style. It has two storeys, and on the garden (south) front are three bays. The outer bays are gabled with bargeboards and finials. The windows have lozenge glazing, and on the entrance (east) front are bay windows. Behind the house are three ranges of farm buildings in brick with slate roofs forming a courtyard. Their features include decorative ventilation holes.
War memorial 53.12498°N 2.48016°W		1920s	The war memorial stands in a small garden near a road junction in Bradfield Green. It is in red sandstone, and consists of a three-stage square obelisk on two square steps. The top and bottom stages taper, and the middle stage contains inscribed plaques on each face, including the names of those lost in the World Wars. Also on the east face is a stone basin with the remains of a metal drinking fountain.

== See also ==
- Listed buildings in Church Minshull
- Listed buildings in Stanthorne
- Listed buildings in Warmingham
- Listed buildings in Wimboldsley
