= Christ Church Tower, Crewe =

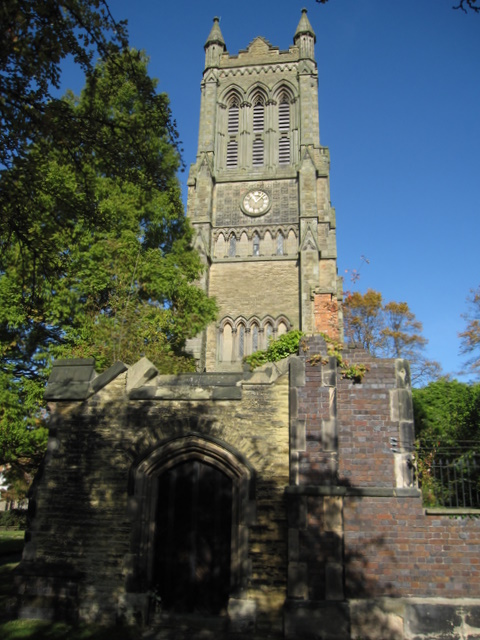
- Christ Church Tower seen from the south

- Location in Cheshire
- 53.0969°N 2.4401°W
- Location: Prince Albert Street, Crewe, Cheshire, England
- OS grid reference: SJ706556

History
- Built: 1877; 149 years ago
- Built for: Grand Junction Railway

Site notes
- Architect: JW Stansby
- Architectural style: Gothic Revival

Listed Building – Grade II
- Official name: Tower of Christ Church
- Designated: 14 June 1984
- Reference no.: 1138680

Christ Church Tower is a Gothic Revival church tower in Prince Albert Street, Crewe, Cheshire, England. It was built in 1877 for Christ Church parish church, and retained when much of the church was demolished in 1977. Within the shell of the former church there is now a memorial garden.

The tower has a ring of ten bells, all cast by Gillett & Johnston of Croydon in 1912. The tower is a Grade II listed building.

== History ==
Christ Church was built for the Grand Junction Railway in 1843, and was almost certainly designed by John Cunningham. The church was consecrated on 18 December 1845 by the Rt Revd John Bird Sumner, Bishop of Chester. Aisles were added in 1864, the tower in 1877, the chancel in 1898 and a northeast chapel in 1906.

In 1977 the nave and aisles were demolished due to dry rot. The Diocese of Chester declared the tower and baptistry redundant on 1 June 1980. However, services continued to be held in the surviving part of the church until November 2013.

== Architecture ==
The tower is built of yellow sandstone with angle buttresses. It has a west door above which is a hood mould, its stops carved with faces. Over this is a window with Geometric tracery. Higher on the tower are more windows, some of which are lancets, and others have trefoil heads. On each side of the tower is a clock dial set in diapered panels. The top stage has louvred triple-lancet bell openings. On the top of the tower is a stepped and gabled parapet, with octagonal crocketed pinnacles at the corners. Originally the tower had an iron crown that was made in the railway workshops.

Some of the walls of the church remain, including parts of the red brick chancel. Also retained is a pair of columns: survivors of a set that until 1901 supported galleries in the nave.

== See also ==
- Listed buildings in Crewe

== Bibliography ==
- Hartwell, Clare; Hyde, Matthew; Hubbard, Edward; Pevsner, Nikolaus (2011) [1971]. Cheshire. The Buildings of England. New Haven, London: Yale University Press. p. 308. ISBN 978-0-300-17043-6.
- Pevsner, Nikolaus; Hubbard, Edward (1971). Cheshire. The Buildings of England. Harmondsworth: Penguin Books. p. 187. ISBN 0-14-071042-6.
