= St Mary's Church, Crewe =

Coordinates: 53.0978°N 2.4468°W

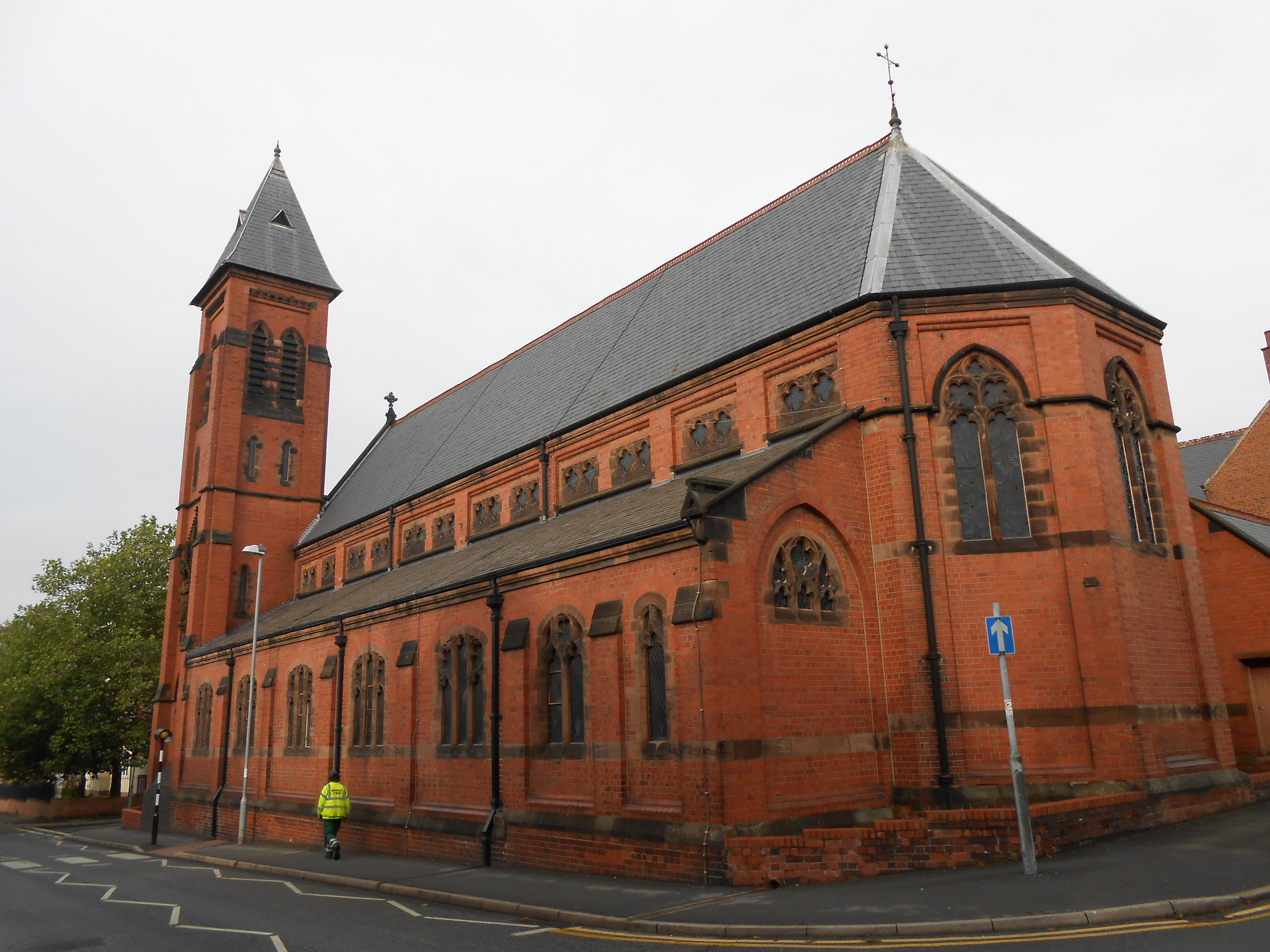
- St Mary's Church, Crewe, from the southeast

- Location in Cheshire
- OS grid reference: SJ 702 557
- Location: St Mary's Street, Crewe, Cheshire
- Country: England
- Denomination: Roman Catholic
- Website: St Mary, Crewe

History
- Status: Parish church

Architecture
- Functional status: Active
- Heritage designation: Grade II
- Designated: 14 June 1984
- Architect: Pugin and Pugin
- Architectural type: Church
- Style: Gothic Revival
- Groundbreaking: 1890
- Completed: 21 September 1891; 134 years ago

Specifications
- Materials: Brick with sandstone dressings Slate roof

Administration
- Diocese: Shrewsbury

Clergy
- Priest: Fr Nick Kern

St Mary's Church is in St Mary's Street, Crewe, Cheshire, England. It is an active Roman Catholic parish church in the diocese of Shrewsbury. The church is recorded in the National Heritage List for England as a designated Grade II listed building.

== History ==
The church was built between 1890 and 1891, the tower being completed at a later date. The architects were Pugin and Pugin.

== Architecture ==
=== Exterior ===
St Mary's is constructed in red brick with red sandstone dressings, and a slate roof. Its architectural style is Decorated. The plan consists of a five-bay nave with a clerestory, north and south aisles, a chancel with an apse, and a southwest tower. The tower has angle buttresses, and a pyramidal roof with lucarnes. In the bottom stage are windows with Geometrical tracery, in the stage above are niches containing statues and flanked by lancet windows, and above these are paired lancets. The top stage contains louvred bell openings. The chancel and the gable of the nave contain windows with Geometrical tracery, the windows along the sides of the aisles have Perpendicular tracery, and the clerestory windows are paired quatrefoils.

=== Interior ===
Inside the church the arcades are carried on octagonal piers. The stone reredos has much gilding and is decorated with Gothic motifs. The baldacchino is supported by marble shafts. The main altar is flanked by side altars, and there are more altars at the east ends of the aisles. The organ dates from 1897 and was built by Gray and Davison.

== See also ==
- Listed buildings in Crewe
