= CW postcode area =

Postcode area within the United Kingdom

Crewe
- Postcode area
- Coordinates: 53.155°N 2.458°W
- Country: United Kingdom
- Postcode area: CW
- Postcode area name: Crewe
- Post towns: 8
- Postcode districts: 13
- Postcode sectors: 52
- Postcodes (live): 9,495
- Postcodes (total): 13,974
- Statistics as at May 2020

The CW postcode area, also known as the Crewe postcode area, is a group of twelve postcode districts in England, within eight post towns. These cover much of Cheshire, including Crewe, Northwich, Congleton, Middlewich, Nantwich, Sandbach, Tarporley and Winsford, plus very small parts of Staffordshire and Shropshire.

Mail for the CW postcode area is processed at Warrington Mail Centre, along with mail for the L, WA and WN postcode areas.

== Coverage ==
The approximate coverage of the postcode districts:

Postcode district	Post town	Coverage	Local authority area(s)
CW1	CREWE	Crewe (north), Haslington, Leighton	Cheshire East
CW2	CREWE	Crewe (south), Wistaston, Woolstanwood	Cheshire East
CW3	CREWE	Madeley, Betley, Woore, Audlem	Cheshire East, Newcastle-under-Lyme, Shropshire
CW4	CREWE	Holmes Chapel, Goostrey, Cranage, Sproston Green	Cheshire East, Cheshire West and Chester
CW5	NANTWICH	Nantwich, Willaston, Sound	Cheshire East
CW6	TARPORLEY	Tarporley, Winsford Rural West	Cheshire West and Chester
CW7	WINSFORD	Winsford (Town), Wharton, Over, Glebe Green, Darnhall, Stanthorne, Bostock, Wimboldsley	Cheshire West and Chester
CW8	NORTHWICH	Northwich (west), Hartford, Weaverham, Castle, Greenbank, Cuddington, Sandiway	Cheshire West and Chester
CW9	NORTHWICH	Northwich (east), Wincham, Lostock Gralam, Rudheath, Leftwich, Davenham, Kingsmead, Antrobus, Comberbach, Aston by Budworth	Cheshire West and Chester, Cheshire East
CW10	MIDDLEWICH	Middlewich, Winsford Rural East	Cheshire East, Cheshire West and Chester
CW11	SANDBACH	Sandbach, Ettiley Heath, Elworth, Wheelock	Cheshire East
CW12	CONGLETON	Congleton, North Rode	Cheshire East, Staffordshire Moorlands
CW98	CREWE		non-geographic

== Map ==
CW postcode area map, showing postcode districts in red and post towns in grey text, with links to nearby CH, SK, ST, SY, TF and WA postcode areas.

== See also ==
- List of postcode areas in the United Kingdom
- Postcode Address File
