= Woolstanwood =

Village in Cheshire, England

Coordinates: 53.096°N 2.479°W

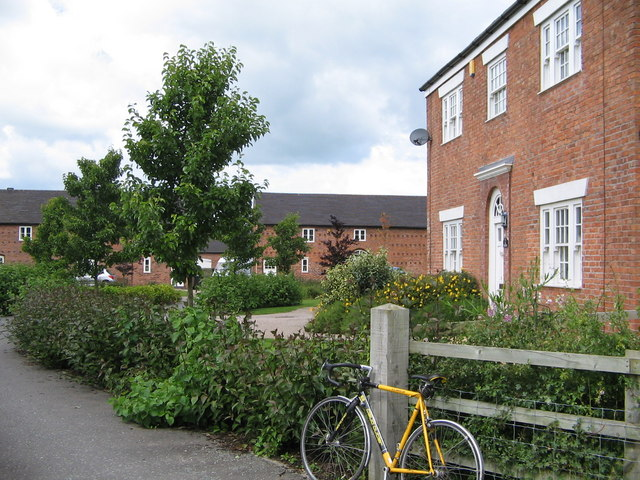
- Wood Farm, Woolstanwood

- Location within Cheshire
- Population: 678 (2011)
- OS grid reference: SJ679556
- Civil parish: Woolstanwood
- Unitary authority: Cheshire East
- Ceremonial county: Cheshire
- Region: North West
- Country: England
- Sovereign state: United Kingdom
- Post town: CREWE
- Postcode district: CW2
- Dialling code: 01270
- Police: Cheshire
- Fire: Cheshire
- Ambulance: North West
- UK Parliament: Crewe and Nantwich

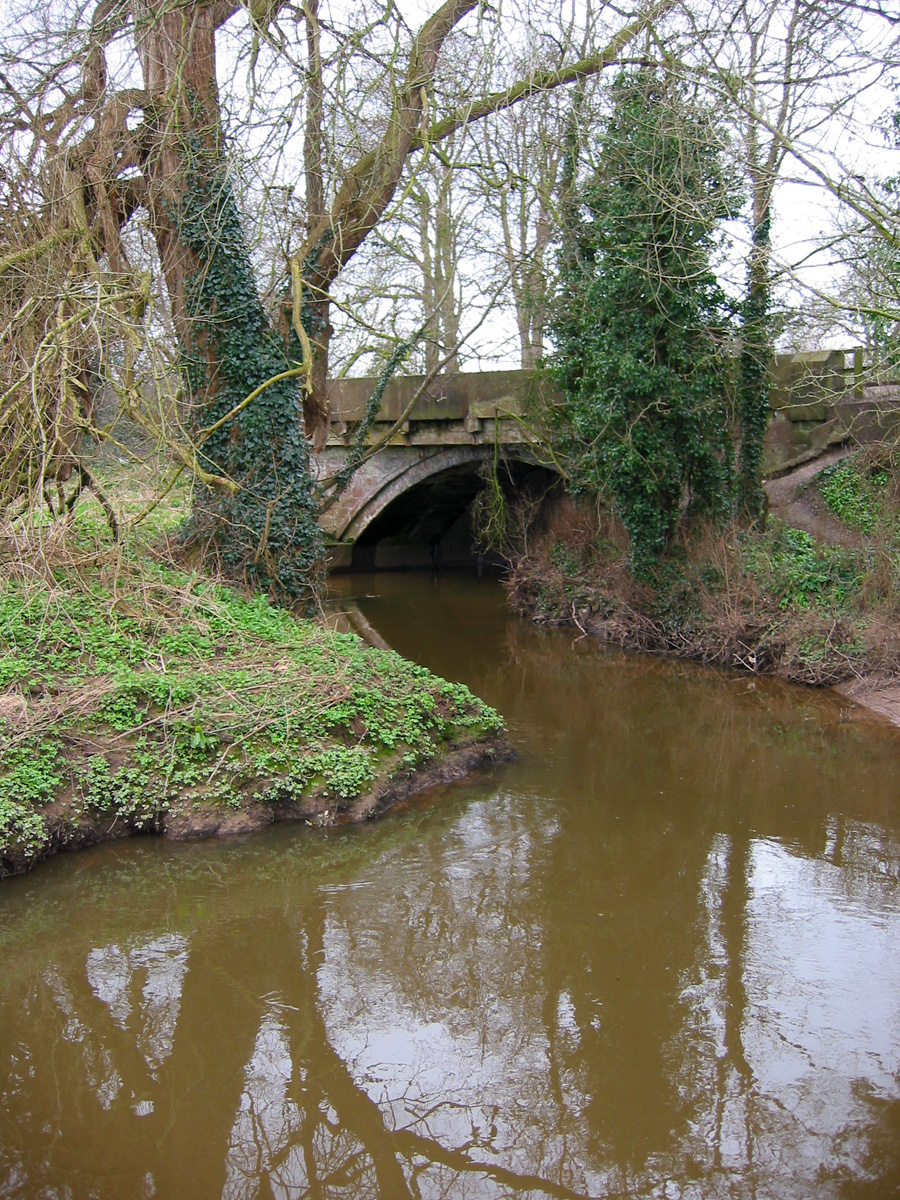
Marshfield Bridge (A530) over Valley Brook

Woolstanwood (also Woolstan Wood) is a village (at SJ680556) and civil parish in the unitary authority of Cheshire East and the ceremonial county of Cheshire, England, which lies immediately to the west of Crewe, 1½ miles from the centre. The parish also includes the settlements of Brassey Bank and Marshfield Bank. Nearby villages include Wistaston and Worleston.

According to the 2001 census, the parish had a population of 723, reducing to 678 at the 2011 Census.

== Governance ==
Woolstanwood is administered by Minshull Vernon and District Parish Council, jointly with Minshull Vernon and Leighton. Four of the 22 parish councillors represent Woolstanwood. From 1974 to 2009 the Borough Council was Crewe and Nantwich. Since 1 April 2009 the civil parish has been administered by the unitary authority of Cheshire East. Woolstanwood falls in the parliamentary constituency of Crewe and Nantwich, which has been represented by Kieran Mullan since 2019, after being represented by Laura Smith (2017–19), Edward Timpson (2008–17) and Gwyneth Dunwoody (1983–2008).

== Geography and transport ==
Much of the civil parish is rural, with the major land use being agricultural. Urban development is present east of the A530 adjacent to Crewe. The River Weaver forms the western boundary of the parish; its tributaries Leighton Brook and Valley Brook form the northern and southern boundaries, respectively. The Crewe–Chester railway line runs east–west through the parish. The A530 between Nantwich and Middlewich runs north–south through the parish, and the A532 splits from it at Marshfield Bank to run eastwards into Crewe.

== Landmarks ==
The parish contains one building that is recorded in the National Heritage List for England as a designated listed building. This is Marshfield Bank Farmhouse, which dates from the late 18th century, and contains some internal timber work possibly from an earlier date. It is built in brick with a tiled roof, is in 2 1/2 storeys, and has a three-bay front. Most of the windows are casements, and there are some horizontally-sliding sashes at the rear. The farmhouse is listed at Grade II. This grade is the lowest of the three gradings given to listed buildings and is applied to "buildings of national importance and special interest".

The Farmhouse public house is located on the roundabout in Marshfield Bank.
