= St Peter's Church, Minshull Vernon =

Coordinates: 53.1309°N 2.4773°W

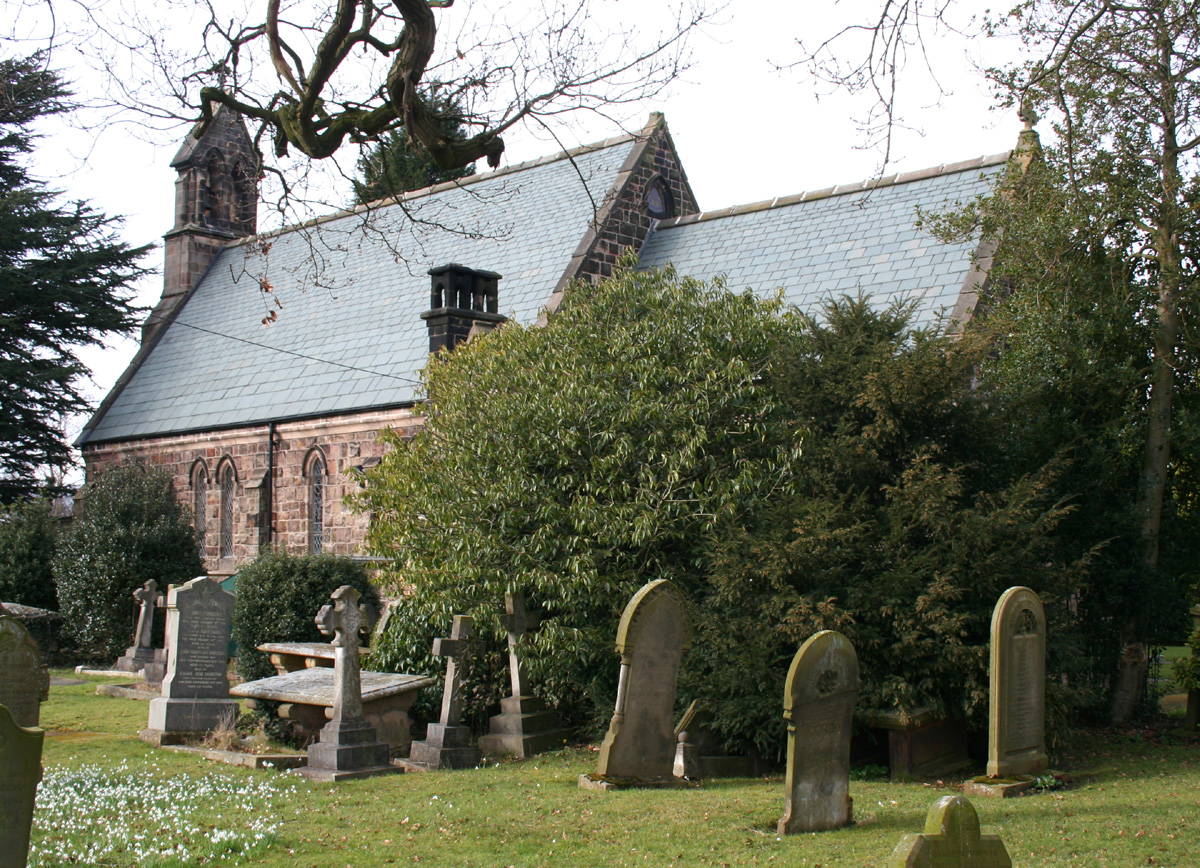
- St Peter's Church, Minshull Vernon, from the northeast

- Location in Cheshire
- OS grid reference: SJ 682 594
- Location: Middlewich Road, Minshull Vernon, Cheshire
- Country: England
- Denomination: Anglican
- Website: St Peter's Church, Leighton-cum-Minshull Vernon

History
- Status: Parish church
- Dedication: Saint Peter
- Consecrated: 12 December 1849

Architecture
- Functional status: Active
- Heritage designation: Grade II
- Designated: 20 December 1983
- Architect: John Matthews
- Architectural type: Church
- Style: Gothic Revival
- Groundbreaking: 1847
- Completed: 1849
- Construction cost: £1,700

Specifications
- Materials: Stone, slate roofs

Administration
- Province: York
- Diocese: Chester
- Archdeaconry: Macclesfield
- Deanery: Nantwich
- Parish: Leighton-cum-Minshull Vernon

Clergy
- Vicar: Revd Catherine Grace Cleghorn (since January 2021)

St Peter's Church is on Middlewich Road in Minshull Vernon, Cheshire, England. It is an active Anglican parish church in the deanery of Nantwich, the archdeaconry of Macclesfield, and the diocese of Chester. Its benefice is combined with that of St Leonard, Warmingham. The church is recorded in the National Heritage List for England as a designated Grade I listed building. It was a Commissioners' church, having received a grant towards its construction from the Church Building Commission.

== History ==
The parish of Minshull Vernon was formed in 1840, and the earlier church stood on a different site nearer to where Leighton Hospital now stands. This church was damaged by fire and was demolished. St Peter's was built between 1847 and 1849 to a design by John Matthews, and consecrated on 12 December 1849. A grant of £150 was given towards its construction by the Church Building Commission, the total cost of its building being £1,700 (equivalent to £190,000 in 2025). A north transept to accommodate the organ was added in 1903, and this was extended in 1913 by Harold Sheldon. Electricity was installed in the church in 1959, and a new vestry was added to the west end of the church in 1966.

== Architecture ==
The church is constructed in stone with slate roofs. Its plan consists of a four-bay nave, a north porch, a chancel that is narrower and lower than the nave, a north transept for the organ, and a south vestry. On the west gable is a double bellcote. Most of the windows are lancets, with a triple lancet at the east end. Inside the church is an oak pulpit and a lectern in the shape of an eagle. On the north wall of the chancel is a trefoil-headed sedilia. The choir benches are carved with poppyheads. The stained glass in the east window was installed in 1879. The glass in the north window of the chancel was moved from a Congregational church in Cheadle in 1974. Stained glass was added to the small window above the chancel arch to celebrate the millennium. Seven further stained glass windows, from a redundant church in Cheadle, were added in 2016. These windows, and the refurbishment of the choir vestry, were dedicated by the Right Rev. Peter Forster, Bishop of Chester, on 3 July 2016, the 50th anniversary of the vestry's original dedication. The three-manual pipe organ was built in 1847 by Wadsworth.

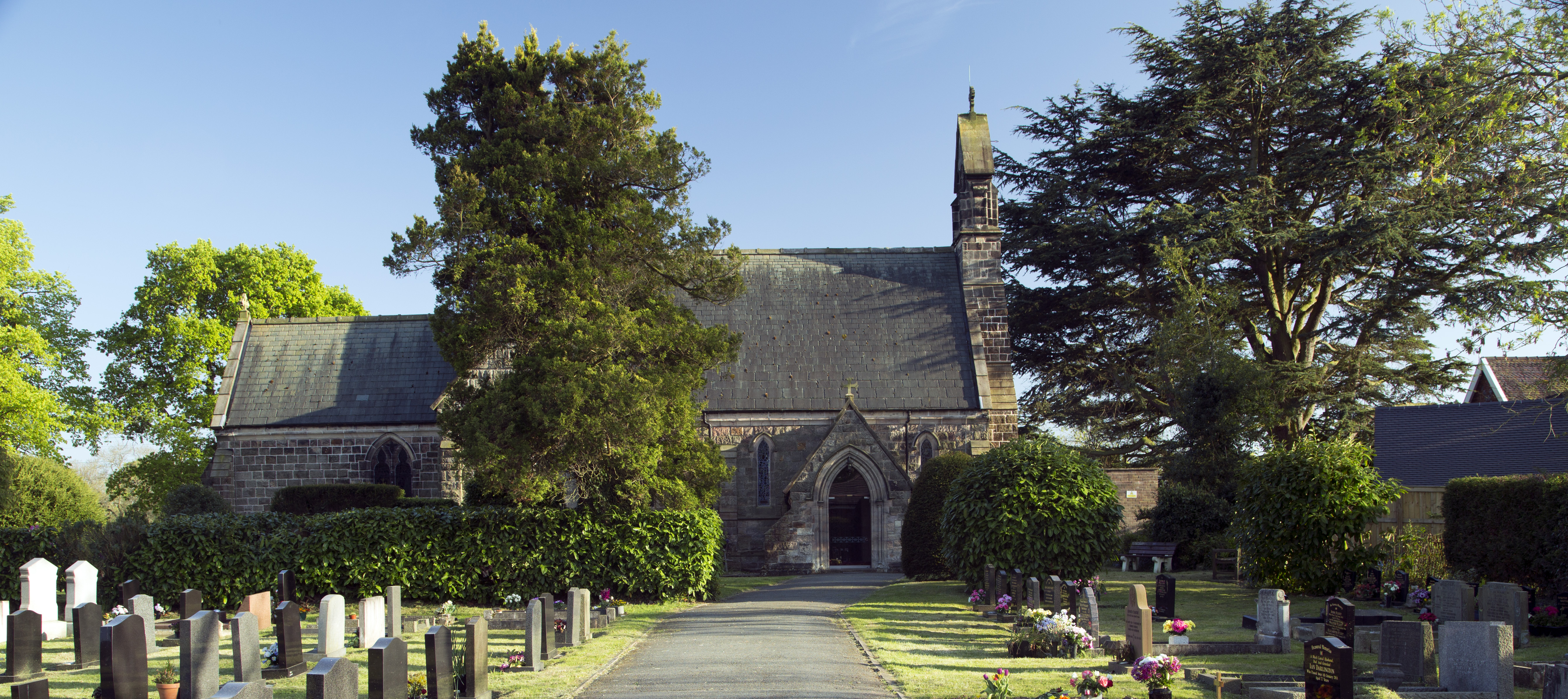

== Churchyard ==
The churchyard contains the war grave, standing east of the church, of a soldier of World War I.

== See also ==
- Listed buildings in Minshull Vernon
