= St Barnabas' Church, Crewe =

Coordinates: 53.1020°N 2.4628°W

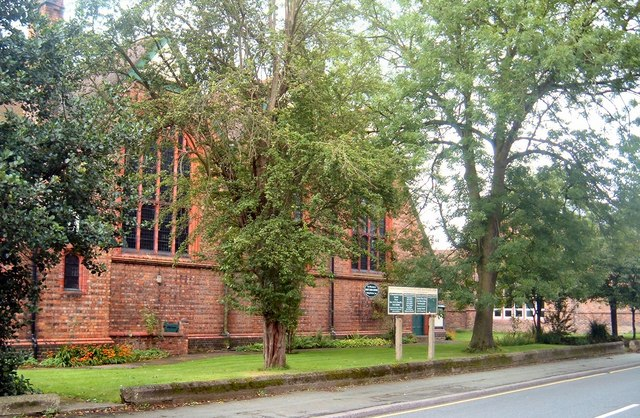
- St Barnabas' Church, Crewe

- Location in Cheshire
- OS grid reference: SJ 691,562
- Location: West Street, Crewe, Cheshire
- Country: England
- Denomination: Anglican
- Churchmanship: Traditional Catholic
- Website: St Barnabas, Crewe

History
- Status: Parish church
- Dedication: Saint Barnabas

Architecture
- Functional status: Active
- Heritage designation: Grade II
- Designated: 14 June 1984
- Architect: Paley and Austin
- Architectural type: Church
- Style: Gothic Revival
- Completed: 1886; 140 years ago

Specifications
- Materials: Brick and red terracotta Red tiled roofs

Administration
- Province: York
- Diocese: Chester
- Archdeaconry: Macclesfield
- Deanery: Nantwich
- Parish: St Barnabas, Crewe

Clergy
- Bishop: The Rt Revd Stephen Race (AEO)
- Vicar: interregnum

St Barnabas' Church is in West Street, Crewe, Cheshire, England. It is an active Anglican parish church in the deanery of Nantwich, the archdeaconry of Macclesfield, and the diocese of Chester. The church is recorded in the National Heritage List for England as a designated Grade II listed building.

== History ==
The church was built in 1884–85 to a design by the Lancaster partnership of Paley and Austin, and was paid for by the London and North Western Railway, being built near to its workshops. The church provided seating for 500 people at an estimated cost of £4,000 (equivalent to £440,000 in 2025).

St Barnabas' Church in the catholic tradition of the Church of England. As the parish has passed resolutions that reject the ordination of women as priests, it receives alternative episcopal oversight from the Bishop of Beverley (currently Stephen Race) and is a member of The Society.

== Architecture ==
=== Exterior ===
St Barnabas' is constructed in brick and red terracotta with red tiled roofs. The architectural style is Perpendicular. Its plan consists of a three-bay nave, north and south aisles, a single-bay chancel, and a southeast vestry. Towards the west end is a shingled flèche. On each side of the church are three cross-gables containing the aisle windows that are timbered at the apexes. The gables at the east and west ends of the church are also timbered.

=== Interior ===
The authors of the Buildings of England series describe the interior of the church as "noble – clear, spacious and open, without being in the least bleak". The arcades consist of terracotta arches carried on pink sandstone piers. Between the nave and the chancel is an open timber screen. At the west end of the nave is a glazed screen forming a baptistry. The reredos and the pulpit are decorated with carving. In the seven-light east window is stained glass dated 1901. The two-manual organ was built in 1887 by Wadsworth, and extended in 1957 by J. W. Walker.

== See also ==
- Listed buildings in Crewe
- List of ecclesiastical works by Paley and Austin
