= St Michael's Church, Coppenhall =

Coordinates: 53.1060°N 2.4474°W

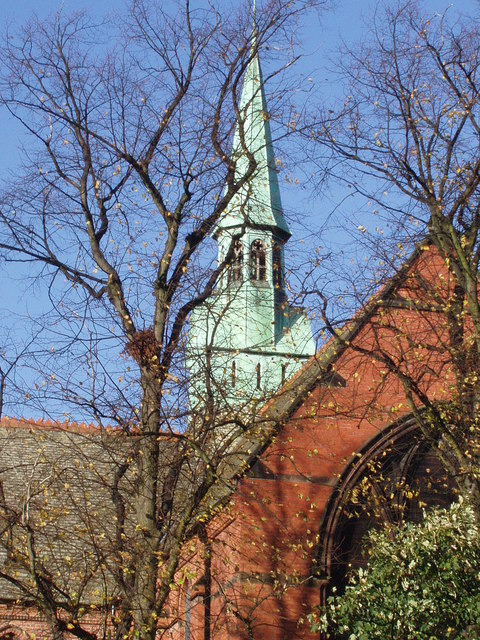
- St Michael's Church, Coppenhall

- Location in Cheshire
- OS grid reference: SJ 702 566
- Location: Crewe, Cheshire
- Country: England
- Denomination: Anglican
- Churchmanship: Catholic
- Website: St Michael, Coppenhall

History
- Status: Parish church
- Founded: c. 1373; 653 years ago
- Dedication: Saint Michael

Architecture
- Functional status: Active
- Heritage designation: Grade II
- Designated: 14 June 1984
- Architect(s): James Brooks; J. Brooks, Son & Adkins
- Architectural type: Church
- Groundbreaking: 1883
- Completed: 1910

Specifications
- Materials: Red brick with slate roofs Copper-covered flèche

Administration
- Province: York
- Diocese: Chester
- Archdeaconry: Macclesfield
- Deanery: Nantwich
- Parish: Coppenhall

Clergy
- Bishop: Glyn Webster Assistant Bishop Chester
- Rector: Fr. John Xavier Leal SSC

St Michael's Church is in the Coppenhall area of Crewe, Cheshire, England. The church is recorded in the National Heritage List for England as a designated Grade II listed building. It is an active Anglican parish church in the diocese of Chester, the archdeaconry of Macclesfield and the deanery of Nantwich.

== History ==
A timber-framed church was built on the site around 1373. The structure of the present church dates from 1883 to 1886 when the chancel was built to a design by James Brooks. The nave was added to a design by J. Brooks, Son and Adkins in 1907–10.

== Architecture ==
=== Exterior ===
The church is built in red brick with slate roofs. Its plan consists of a four-bay nave with a clerestory, north and south aisles, transepts and a chancel with an organ to its north and a chapel to its south. Over the crossing is a copper-covered flèche. The church is built on a blue brick plinth and has a stone cill band and stone lancet windows.

=== Interior ===
To the west of the church is the baptistery which contains a marble font with an oak crocketted cover. The reredos is painted in the style of an icon. The pulpit is of oak. On the walls are alabaster memorials and timber Stations of the Cross. The three-manual organ was built around 1900 by Forster and Andrews, and rebuilt in 1977 with alterations, by Sixsmith. The organ was rebuilt in 2017, again by Sixsmith, taking the opportunity to remove any asbestos in the structure.

== External features ==
The churchyard contains the double war grave of the twin Villiers-Russell brothers, Senior Sick Berth Attendants of the Royal Navy Auxiliary Reserve, who died in the torpedoing of HMS Formidable during World War I, in 1915.

== See also ==
- Listed buildings in Crewe
