= St Peter's Church, Crewe =

Coordinates: 53.0982°N 2.4332°W

- The church in 2026

- Location in Cheshire
- OS grid reference: SJ 711 558
- Location: Earle Street, Crewe, Cheshire
- Country: England
- Denomination: Anglican
- Website: St Peter, Crewe

History
- Status: Parish church
- Dedication: Saint Peter
- Dedicated: 5 May 1923
- Consecrated: 29 April 1931

Architecture
- Functional status: Active
- Heritage designation: Grade II
- Designated: 14 June 1984
- Architect(s): J. Brooke and C. E. Elcock
- Architectural type: Church
- Groundbreaking: 1914
- Completed: 1923; 103 years ago

Specifications
- Materials: Sandstone, slate roof

Administration
- Province: York
- Diocese: Chester
- Archdeaconry: Macclesfield
- Deanery: Nantwich
- Parish: St Peter, Crewe

Clergy
- Vicar: Revd Jim Britcliffe

St Peter's Church is in Earle Street, Crewe, Cheshire, England. It is an active Anglican parish church in the deanery of Nantwich, the archdeaconry of Macclesfield, and the diocese of Chester. Its benefice is combined with that of All Saints and St Paul, Crewe. The church is recorded in the National Heritage List for England as a designated Grade II listed building.

== History ==
St Peter's began as a prefabricated mission church to St Paul's, Crewe, in 1894. In 1912 the structure was moved and re-erected elsewhere, being dedicated to All Saints the following year. Building of the present church began in 1914 and was completed in 1923. The architects were J. Brooke and C. E. Elcock. Construction of the church was delayed because of funding problems caused by the First World War. The new church was dedicated on 5 May 1923. St Peter's became a separate parish in its own right in 1931, and was consecrated on 29 April of that year.

== Architecture ==
The church is constructed in red sandstone ashlar with a green slate roof. From the west its plan consists of a narthex, a two-bay baptistry with narrow aisles, which leads to a three-bay nave with wider aisles, then a two-bay chancel with an organ chamber on the north and a vestry on the south. Each bay of the wider aisles is gabled, the gables containing Perpendicular-style windows interspersed with lancet windows containing stained glass. On the west gable is a double bellcote surmounted by a cross finial.

Inside the church, behind the altar, is a reredos carved with The Last Supper. The chancel contains a sedilia and choir stalls. The pulpit is in oak. The stained glass includes windows by D. Brookes of Weirs Glass dating from the middle of the 20th century, and an earlier window in the baptistry depicting Saint Peter. The organ was built in 1932 by Whiteley, and modified in 1984 by Sixsmith.

== See also ==
- Listed buildings in Crewe
