= Union Street Baptist Church, Crewe =

Coordinates: 53.0918°N 2.4403°W

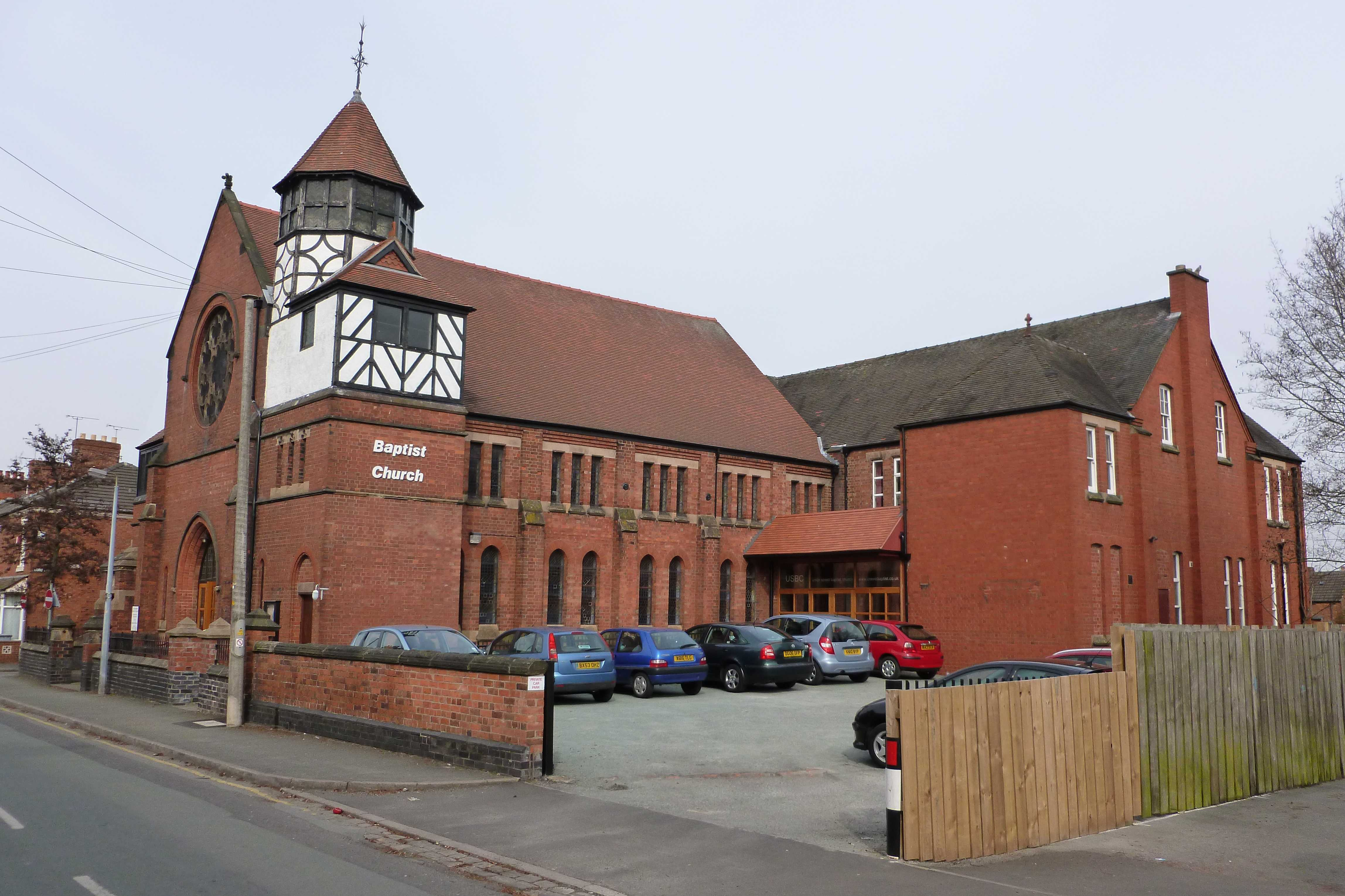
- Union Street Baptist Church, Crewe

- Location in Cheshire
- OS grid reference: SJ 706 551
- Location: Union Street, Crewe, Cheshire
- Country: England
- Denomination: Baptist

Architecture
- Functional status: Active
- Heritage designation: Grade II
- Designated: 10 March 1999
- Architect: J. Wallis Chapman
- Architectural type: Church
- Style: Eclectic
- Groundbreaking: 1882
- Completed: 1884

Specifications
- Materials: Brick with ashlar dressings Tiled roof

Union Street Baptist Church is in Union Street, Crewe, Cheshire, England. It is recorded in the National Heritage List for England as a designated Grade II listed building. In addition to the church, the attached vestry, meeting rooms and offices, boundary wall and railing are included in the listing.

== History ==
The church was built between 1882 and 1884 to a design by J. Wallis Chapman. It was built to serve the railway workers in the town.

== Architecture ==
Constructed in brick, the church has ashlar dressings and a tiled roof. It contains features from many architectural styles, with Gothic predominating. The church is rectangular in five-bays, with the vestry and meeting room at the east end forming a T-plan. At the west end is a doorway with a pointed arch, flanked by single lancet windows. Above these is a round window containing Decorated tracery. To the right of this is a three-stage stair turret, surmounted by a timber-framed octagonal lantern. To the left is another, lower, stair turret, the upper stage of which has continuous glazing under a hipped roof. Along the sides, each bay contains two lancet windows with a flat-headed three-light window above. Inside the church is a gallery on all sides carried on cast iron columns. At the front of the church is a raised platform over a tiled baptistry. All the windows contain patterned stained glass. The two-manual pipe organ is housed in the gallery. It was installed in 1922, and made by Ernest Wadsworth of Manchester.

== See also ==
- Listed buildings in Crewe
