= Minshull Vernon United Reformed Church =

Coordinates: 53.1419°N 2.4834°W

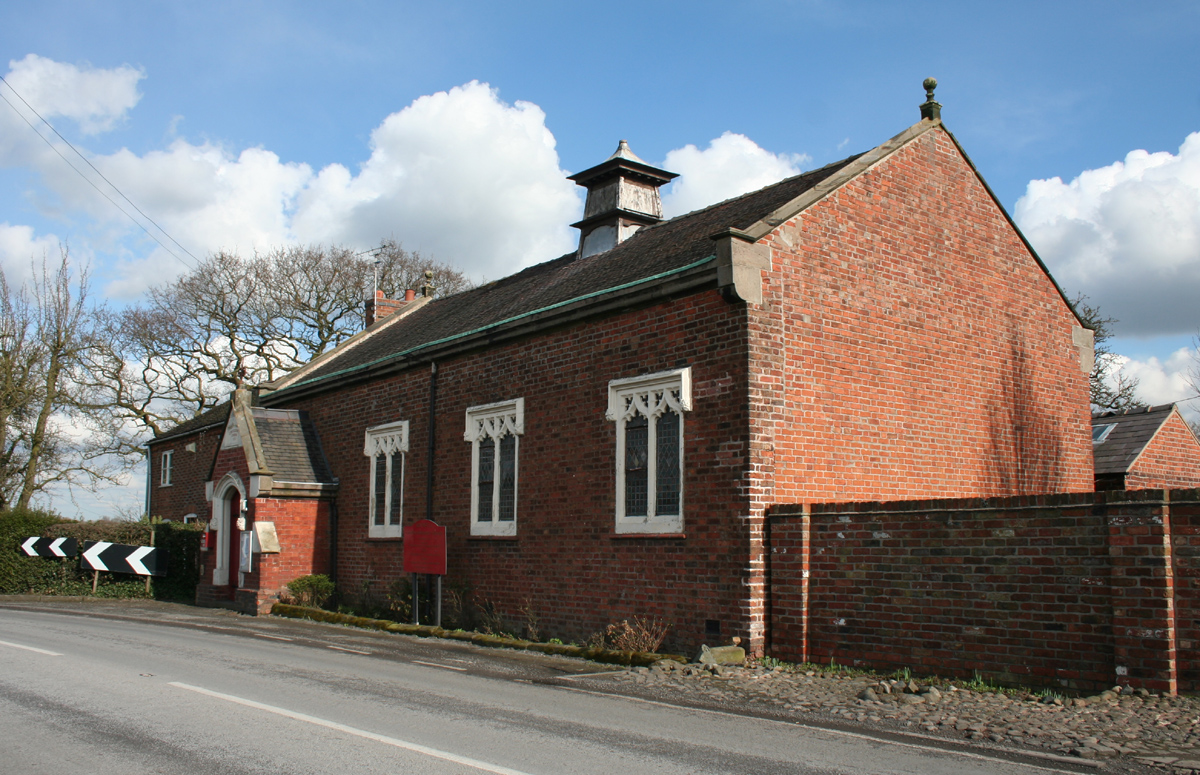
- Minshull Vernon United Reformed Church

- Location in Cheshire
- Location: Cross Lane, Minshull Vernon, Cheshire
- Country: England
- Denomination: United Reformed Church

Architecture
- Functional status: Active
- Heritage designation: Grade II
- Designated: 12 January 1967
- Architectural type: Church
- Completed: 1809

Specifications
- Materials: Brick, tiled roof

Minshull Vernon United Reformed Church is on Cross Lane, Minshull Vernon, Cheshire, England. It is recorded in the National Heritage List for England as a designated Grade II listed building.

== History ==
The building was originally a Congregational church constructed in 1809. In 1884 the interior of the church was improved and heating was installed at a cost of nearly £470 (equivalent to £50,000 in 2025). The church was further renovated in 1906, electricity was installed in 1946, and a water supply was connected and a kitchen added in 1975.

== Architecture ==
Constructed in brick, the church has a tiled roof. It is in four bays with a porch. On the sides of the church are two-light mullioned windows. On the north side is one original window containing Y-tracery. On the gables are ball finials. Inside the church a dado rail separates pine wainscotting below from the plastered walls above. At the east end of the church is an organ, in front of which is a U-shaped communion rail.

== See also ==
- Listed buildings in Minshull Vernon
