= List of works by George Latham =

George Latham (died 1871) was an English architect and surveyor, who practised from on office in Nantwich, Cheshire. His works include churches, country houses, a workhouse, a bank, and a market hall. Hartwell et al. in the Buildings of England series consider that his finest work was Arley Hall. He designed buildings in a variety of architectural styles, including Neoclassical, Jacobean, and Georgian.

== Major works ==
=== Key ===
Grade	Criteria
II*	Particularly important buildings of more than special interest.
II	Buildings of national importance and special interest.
"—" denotes a work that is not graded.

=== Works ===
Name	Location	Photograph	Date	Notes	Grade
Church of St Mary the Virgin	Wistaston, Cheshire; 53.0789°N 2.4772°W		1827–28	A church in Georgian style. The chancel was lengthened and a transept added in 1884 in the same style.	II
Willington Hall	Willington, Cheshire; 53.1887°N 2.7005°W		1829	Built as a country house, it was extended in 1878 and in the 1920s. During the 1950s it was reduced in size, and a portico was added in 1950. It has since been used as a hotel.	II
Arley Hall	Arley, Cheshire; 53.3243°N 2.4886°W		1832–46	Built as a country house for Rowland Egerton-Warburton to replace an earlier house on the site.	II*
St Jude's Church	Tilstone Fearnall, Cheshire; 53.1397°N 2.6503°W		1836	Sited opposite the entrance to Tilstone Lodge, it was paid for by its owner, Admiral John Tollemache (formerly Halliday).	II
Northwich Union Workhouse	Northwich, Cheshire; 53.2540°N 2.5136°W		1837–39	Originally built as workhouse, it later became the Salt Museum, and then the Weaver Hall Museum and Workhouse.	II
Congregational Church	Nantwich, Cheshire; 53.0671°N 2.5193°W		1842–43	A large brick building, now closed.	II
Savings Bank	Welsh Row, Nantwich, Cheshire; 53.0677°N 2.5265°W		1846–47	Built as a bank, later used as offices.	II
Harris Institute	Avenham Lane, Preston, Lancashire; 53.7545°N 2.6988°W		1849	Added a terraced forecourt to a building of 1846–49. Originally the Institute for the Diffusion of Knowledge, later part of the University of Central Lancashire.	II*
Market Hall	Market Street, Nantwich, Cheshire; 53.0676°N 2.5205°W	Market Hall, Nantwich	1867–68	This has a central entrance, above which is a crest. Along the top is a panel containing the coats of arms of local families. The windows are mullioned and tramsomed. Inside are two rows of cast iron columns carrying the iron roof.	—
