= Nantwich Methodist Church =

Nantwich Methodist Church can refer to several Methodist churches and chapels in Nantwich, Cheshire, including:

- Wesleyan Methodist Church, Nantwich (1808–2009)
- Primitive Methodist Chapel, Nantwich (1840–2001)
