= Listed buildings in Willington, Cheshire =

Willington is a civil parish in Cheshire West and Chester, England. It contains nine buildings that are recorded in the National Heritage List for England as designated listed buildings. Of these, one is listed at Grade II*, the middle grade, and the others are at Grade II. The parish is entirely rural, and contains two listed country houses, Tirley Garth and Willington Hall, both of which are listed. The other listed structures are associated with these houses, plus a farmhouse.

== Key ==
Grade	Criteria
II*	Particularly important buildings of more than special interest
II	Buildings of national importance and special interest

== Buildings ==
Name and location	Photograph	Date	Notes	Grade
Home Farmhouse; 53.19175°N 2.70162°W	—	Early to mid 18th century	The farmhouse is built in brick and has a Welsh slate roof. It has a double-pile plan, is in two storeys with an attic, and has a nearly symmetrical three-bay front. The central bay contains a gabled porch. The windows are casements.	II
Willington Hall; 53.1887°N 2.7005°W		1829	A country house designed by George Latham. It was extended in 1878, then reduced in size in the 1950s when it was converted into a hotel. The house is built in orange brick with blue brick diapering, sandstone dressings and a Welsh slate roof. It has a square plan, and is in two storeys with an attic. The entrance front is symmetrical with three bays. The lateral bays contain canted bay windows and shaped gables, and in the centre is a Tuscan portico. The windows are mullioned and transomed.	II
Terrace walls, Willington Hall; 53.18829°N 2.70066°W	—	c. 1830	The walls are on the east and south sides of the terrace. They are in sandstone, and consist of a plain wall with square piers. Near the southwest corner is a semicircular viewing point with a balustrade and a parapet. On the right side is a flight of six steps. The east wall is shaped and has a projection to contain a sundial.	II
Sundial, Willington Hall; 53.18846°N 2.70015°W	—	c. 1830	The sundial is in ashlar buff sandstone. It stands on a square base, is decorated with strapwork, and has a moulded capstone. On the top is a circular inscribed bronze plate.	II
Tirley Garth; 53.1912°N 2.6820°W		1907	A large country house designed by C. E. Mallows in Art and Crafts style. It is constructed in roughcast brick with stone dressings and stone slate roofs. The house is built around an internal courtyard surrounded by cloister walks and containing a pond. It is in three storeys, with a symmetrical five-bay garden front. The windows are mullioned and transomed. In the entrance front is a large tower. The entrance courtyard walls are included in the listing.	II*
Eastern entrance of southern gateway, Tirley Garth; 53.18872°N 2.68279°W		c. 1910	Designed by C. E. Mallows, this consists of three rectangular red sandstone piers. Between the pair on the right is a wooden gate. Between the pair on the left are four stone steps and a bar that form a stile.	II
South lodge, Tirley Garth; 53.18864°N 2.68244°W		c. 1910	The lodge was designed by C. E. Mallows, and is built in pebbledashed brick on a stone plinth with sandstone dressings and a York stone-slate roof. It is in two storeys, and has a four-bay front. The windows are mullioned. In the second bay is a two-storey gabled porch, and the third and fourth bays contain half-dormers.	II
East terrace, walls and steps, Tirley Garth; 53.1911°N 2.6813°W		c. 1912	Designed by T. H. Mawson, the terrace has a parapet, and steps lead down to two lawns surrounded by walls. The terrace is in York stone and the walls and steps are in sandstone. At the junctions of the walls are small enclosed gardens, which enclose respectively a circular pond, a hexagonal formal bed, and a pool with a fountain under a canopy.	II
South terrace and walls, Tirley Garth; 53.19099°N 2.68209°W		c. 1912	Designed by T. H. Mawson, the terrace is paved in York stone and the walls and steps are in sandstone. A flight of eleven segmental steps project southwards from the wall, flanked by open parapets. From the southwest corner of the terrace steps lead to a small rectangular garden.	II
