= Listed buildings in Wistaston =

Wistaston is a civil parish in Cheshire East, England. It contains four buildings that are recorded in the National Heritage List for England as designated listed buildings. Of these, one is listed at Grade II*, the middle of the three grades, and the others are at Grade II, the lowest grade. The parish is partly residential and partly rural. The listed buildings consist of three farmhouses and a church.

== Key ==
Grade	Criteria
II*	Particularly important buildings of more than special interest
II	Buildings of national importance and special interest

== Buildings ==
Name and location	Photograph	Date	Notes	Grade
West End; 53.08803°N 2.48206°W	—	Early 17th century	A timber-framed farmhouse on a stone plinth with whitewashed infill and a tiled roof. It is in 2 1/2 storeys, the upper part being jettied. To the left is a projecting gabled wing that was added in the 19th century. This is in brick painted to simulate timber-framing. The windows are casements.	II*
Red Hall Farmhouse; 53.08045°N 2.49387°W	—	17th century	Originally timber-framed, the farmhouse has been altered and extended and is in brick with a tiled roof. It is in two storeys and has a symmetrical three bay front with a central gabled porch. The windows are casements. There is a 1 1/2-storey extension to the left, and a projecting wing to the rear.	II
Church Farmhouse; 53.07919°N 2.47766°W	—	Early 19th century	The house is built in brick with a tiled roof, and is in two storeys. The original part is in three bays with a central porch and doorway. A single-bay extension was added to the left later in the 19th century, and is in a similar style.	II
Church of St Mary the Virgin; 53.07891°N 2.47715°W		1826–27	The church was designed by George Latham in Georgian style. It was extended in a similar style in 1884, and further altered in 1905. The church is built in brick with a slate roof, and consists of a nave, a chancel and a west tower.	II
