= Listed buildings in Tilstone Fearnall =

Tilstone Fearnall is a former civil parish, now in the parishes of Tiverton and Tilstone Fearnall and Rushton, in Cheshire West and Chester, England. It contains nine buildings that are recorded in the National Heritage List for England as designated listed buildings, all of which are listed at Grade II. This grade is the lowest of the three gradings given to listed buildings and is applied to "buildings of national importance and special interest". Apart from the village of Tilstone Fearnall, the parish is rural. The Shropshire Union Canal passes through the parish, and three of the listed building are associated with it, a bridge, a lock, and a linkman's hut. The other listed buildings include a church, a vicarage, a former mill, and houses and associated structures.

Name and location	Photograph	Date	Notes
Tilstone Hall Folly; 53.14283°N 2.64038°W		Early 17th century	This was a gatehouse or a summer house, and is in ruins. It is constructed in red sandstone and brick. The structure consists of an archway with cabled Roman Doric columns, with some parts missing. Flanking the archway are three-light mullioned windows with pediments. Above the arch is an entablature. The structure is also a Scheduled Monument.
Bridge; 53.12993°N 2.64841°W		c. 1767	The bridge (No. 106) carries a road across the Shropshire Union Canal. It is a single-span bridge in whitewashed brick. It consists of a segmental arch, and has curved retaining walls.
Canal Lock; 53.12988°N 2.64803°W		c. 1772	The lock is on the Shropshire Union Canal. It is constructed in sandstone, and wooden gates. The lock is rectangular and has a pair of gates at each end.
Tilstone Fearnall Mill; 53.12978°N 2.64849°W		Late 18th to early 19th century	A former brick water mill that has been converted into a house. It stands on sloping ground, with two storeys at the front and three at the back. At the front are three symmetrical bays with a central doorway. The loading bay and hoist at the rear have been retained. In the gable ends are lunette windows, and elsewhere are small-paned windows.
Vicarage; 53.1398°N 2.6514°W	—	Late 18th to early 19th century	The vicarage is built in brick with stone dressings and a slate roof. It is in two storeys, and consists of a main four-bay block, with a single-bay projecting wing to the left. The doorway is arched with a fanlight.
Tilstone Lodge; 53.14483°N 2.64609°W		1821–25	A country house for Admiral John Tollemache, designed by Thomas Harrison. It is built in stuccoed brick with stone dressings and a slate roof. The house consists of a main block with three bays, and a service wing. It is in two storeys with sash windows, and has a porte-cochère with two pairs of unfluted Doric columns. An orangery was added to the southeast corner later in the 19th century.
Ice house, Tilstone Lodge; 53.14517°N 2.64702°W	—	Early 19th century	The ice house is built in brick with a timber roof, and consists of a barrel-vaulted tunnel leading to a circular chamber. It has a rectangular central doorway. Inside the ice house the walls are stuccoed.
St Jude's Church; 53.1397°N 2.6503°W		1836	The church was designed by George Latham and was paid for by John Tollemache. It is built in sandstone with a slate roof. The church consists of an undivided nave and chancel under one roof, with a vestry to the east of the chancel. On the west gable is a bellcote surmounted by a canopy with crockets. At the corners of the west end are turrets topped by spires.
Linkman's hut 53.12975°N 2.64787°W		Mid- to late 19th century	The hut is adjacent to Tilstone Fearnall Lock. It is built in brick with stone dressings and a slate roof, and has a circular plan. The hut has a curved wooden door with a chamfered stone lintel, which is flanked by square windows. At the top of the hut is stone coping and a parapet. The hut has a domed roof with a central chimney pot.
