= Church of St Mary the Virgin, Wistaston =

Coordinates: 53.0789°N 2.4772°W

- Church of St Mary the Virgin, Wistaston, from the southwest in 2026

- Location in Cheshire
- OS grid reference: SJ 682 536
- Location: Wistaston, Cheshire
- Country: England
- Denomination: Anglican
- Website: Website

History
- Status: Parish church
- Dedication: Virgin Mary
- Consecrated: 1828

Architecture
- Functional status: Active
- Heritage designation: Grade II
- Designated: 12 January 1967
- Architect: George Latham
- Architectural type: Church
- Style: Georgian
- Completed: 1905

Specifications
- Materials: Brick with slate roof

Administration
- Province: York
- Diocese: Chester
- Archdeaconry: Macclesfield
- Deanery: Nantwich
- Parish: Wistaston

Clergy
- Rector: Rev. Mike Turnbull

The Church of St Mary the Virgin is in the village of Wistaston, Cheshire, England. The church is recorded in the National Heritage List for England as a designated Grade II listed building. It is an active Anglican parish church in the diocese of Chester, the archdeaconry of Macclesfield and the deanery of Nantwich.

== History ==
It is believed that there has been a church or chapel on or near the present site for nearly 700 years. The first record of a rector goes back to 1379. The first church on the site would have been a wooden building. The existing records start in 1572. In 1827 the decision was taken that "due to decay it [the church] was unsuitable for public worship". The present church was built in 1827–28 to a design by George Latham. The chancel was lengthened, and a transept was added in 1884. Further alterations were made in 1905.

== Architecture ==
=== Exterior ===
The church is built in brick with a slate roof. Its plan consists of a west tower, a nave and a chancel. The architectural historian Nikolaus Pevsner considered that the church is "entirely Georgian" in style and that this style was maintained in the 1884 additions.

=== Interior ===
The chancel has oak panelling with carvings of sunflowers. The reredos contains representations of the Agnus Dei and Alpha and Omega signs. The right hand chancel window is to a design of Burne-Jones and was made by Morris and Company. In the church is a parish chest dated 1684 and a number of wall memorials dating from the 19th century. The two-manual organ was built by Hill in 1884 and in 1890 it was moved from the west gallery to the south of the chancel. There is a ring of eight bells. Six of these were cast by Gillett & Johnston in 1920 and the other two in 1982 by the Whitechapel Bell Foundry.

== External features ==
The churchyard contains the war graves of three soldiers and an airman of World War I, and three soldiers of World War II. It also contains the local war memorial.

== See also ==
- Listed buildings in Wistaston
