= Tirley Garth =

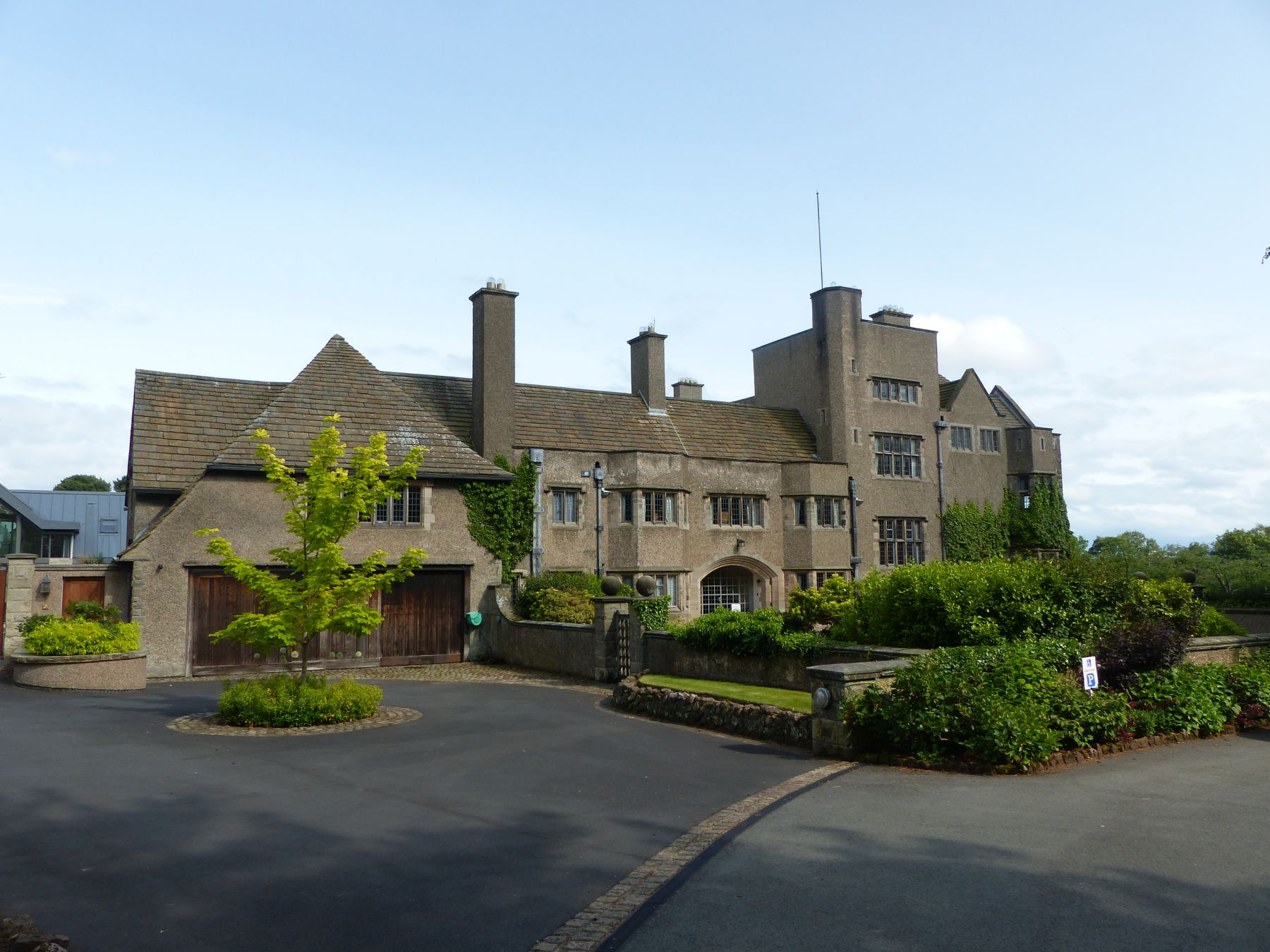
- West front, Tirley Garth

- Location in Cheshire
- 53.1913°N 2.6820°W
- Location: Tarporley, Cheshire, England
- OS grid reference: SJ 545 662

History
- Built: 1907
- Built for: Bryan Leesmith

Site notes
- Architect: C. E. Mallows

Listed Building – Grade II*
- Designated: 8 November 1985
- Reference no.: 1330306

Tirley Garth is a large country house some 2.5 miles (4 km) to the north of Tarporley, Cheshire, England. The house together with its entrance courtyard walls are recorded in the National Heritage List for England as a designated Grade II* listed building.

== History ==
The building of the house began in 1907 for Bryan Leesmith, a director of the chemical firm of Brunner Mond, the architect being C. E. Mallows. Before it was completed, Leesmith had to sell the house and its ownership passed to Brunner Mond. It was then leased to Richard Henry Prestwich, who was a director of Burberry’s. Prestwich’s daughter, Irene, continued to rent the property after her father’s death in 1940. Irene was a member of the campaign for Moral Re-Armament (MRA) and in 1940 she invited the organisation to move here to shelter from the war. In November 1940 36 incendiary bombs fell in the garden and one on the house. During the war the gardens were used for growing produce which was taken to the local markets. After the war Irene bought the house and grounds from Imperial Chemical Industries, the successors of Brunner Mond, and presented it to MRA, establishing the Tirley Garth Trust in order to preserve it. Irene Prestwich died in 1974. In 2002, as the house and grounds were surplus to the requirements of MRA, they were sold to Mersey Television.

== Architecture ==
Tirley Garth is built in pebble-dashed brick with buff sandstone dressings, a York stone-slate roof and tall pebble-dashed chimneys. It is designed in the Art and Crafts style. The word “garth” in its name derives from the house being built around an internal courtyard. On all sides of the courtyard are stone cloisters with three arches on each side and in its centre is a sunken circular pool reached by curved steps. The living quarters are on the south, west and east sides. The south front, with views towards the Beeston and Peckforton Hills, is the main front. It is symmetrical with five bays, all of which are gabled. The central bay has a large semicircular projection in two storeys with an eleven-light mullioned and transomed window behind which is the great hall. Above this is a five-light window. The end bays have canted two-storey projections with four-light windows above them. The west front is the entrance front. It has eight bays, is mainly in two storeys, and has a three-storey tower to the right. Internally there are many architectural details with some fine wood-carving, and tiles which are unique to the house.

== Gardens and associated structures ==
The gardens were also designed by Mallows who believed that in order to create a unity of design, they should be designed by the architect to create a whole with the house. Mallows worked from rooms adjacent to those of the landscape architect Thomas Mawson, and it is likely that Mawson influenced Mallows' designs. The degree of Mawson's involvement is uncertain but he did produce planting plans which were published. The park and garden are registered at Grade II*. The garden covers an area of about 16 hectares, and is the only Grade II* Arts and Crafts garden in Cheshire that remains complete.

To the west of the house is a turning circle and to the south are formal terraced gardens which lead to a sunken garden. Beyond this the land slopes down to a valley containing many rhododendrons. To the east of the house terraces lead to two enclosed lawns and a small octagonal garden containing a fountain. Beyond these is a rose garden consisting of seven semicircular terraces of grass and rose beds. From the north of these a path leads to the Round Acre, a circular area initially intended for the kitchen garden, now planted with flowering cherry trees. The gardens are open to visitors on one or two days each year by arrangement through the National Gardens Scheme.

Structures around the house and in the garden are listed at Grade II. These are the eastern gateway at the southern entrance to the house, which consists of gatepiers and a stile in bossed red sandstone, designed about 1910 by Mallows; the south terrace with its complex of walls, designed about 1912 by Mawson; and the walls and steps of the east terrace and associated formal gardens, also designed around the same time by Mawson. The lodge house at the southern entrance, designed by Mallows, is also Grade II listed.

Listed buildings at Tirley Garth

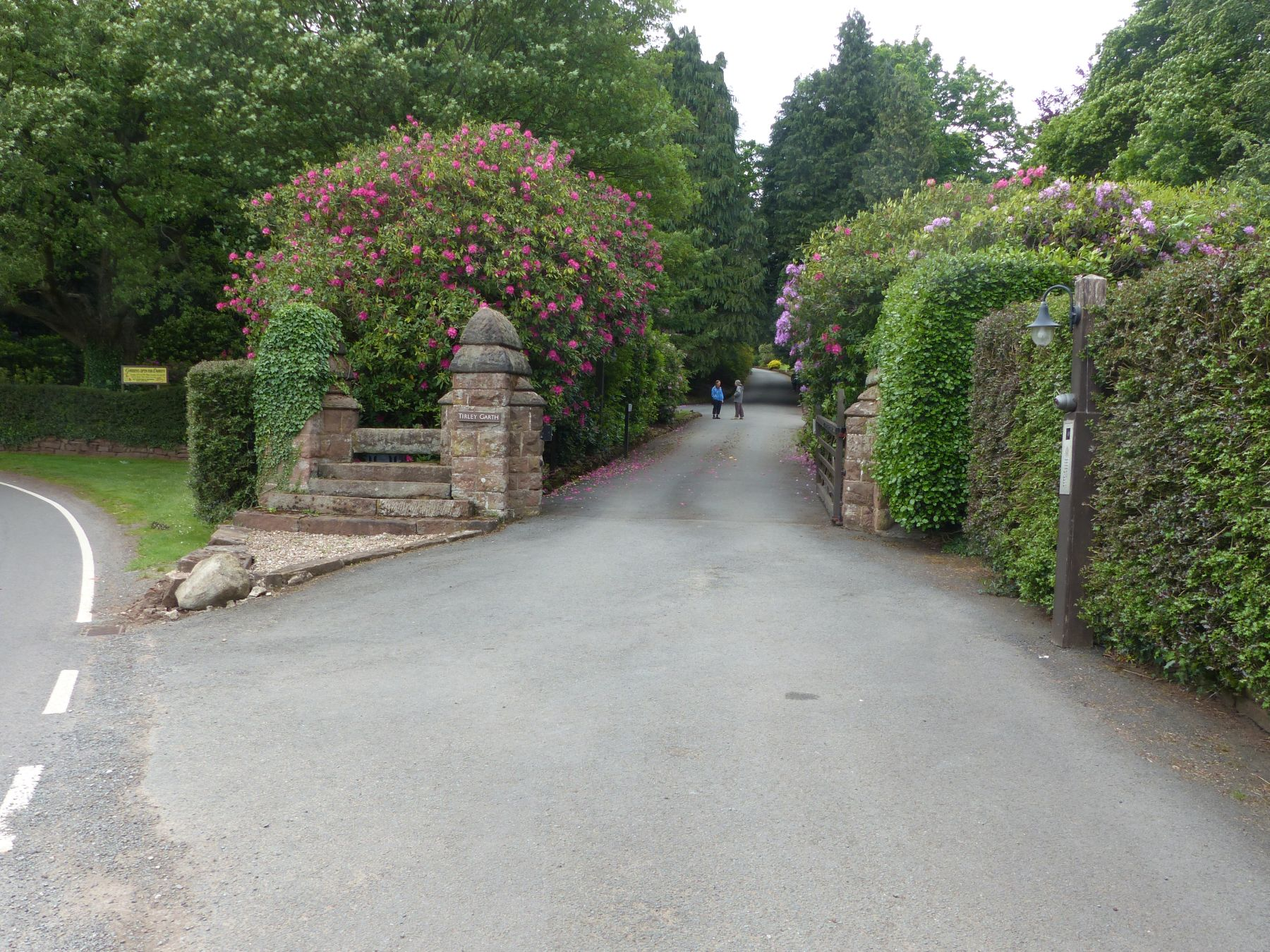
Eastern gateway at southern entrance

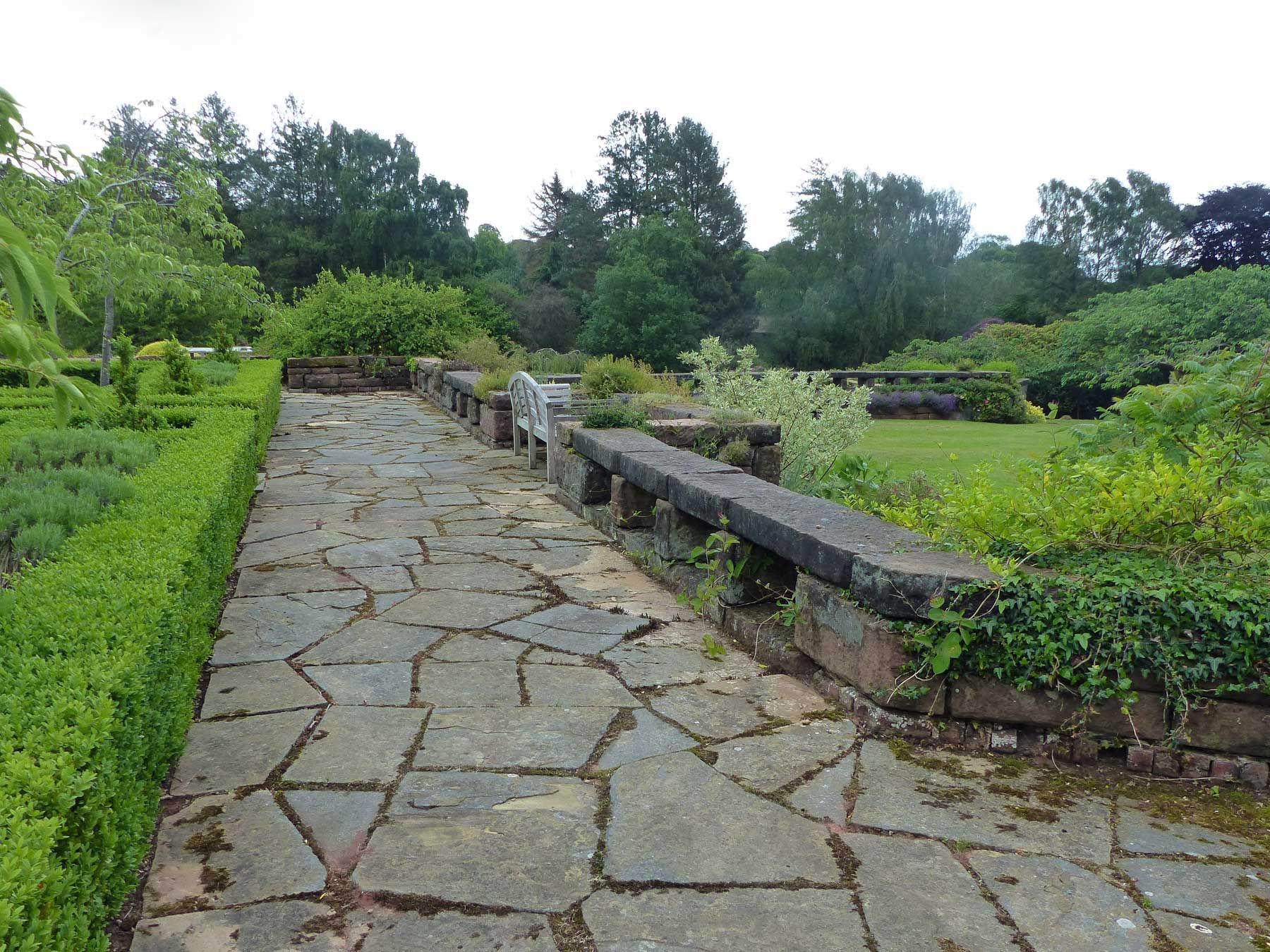
South terrace

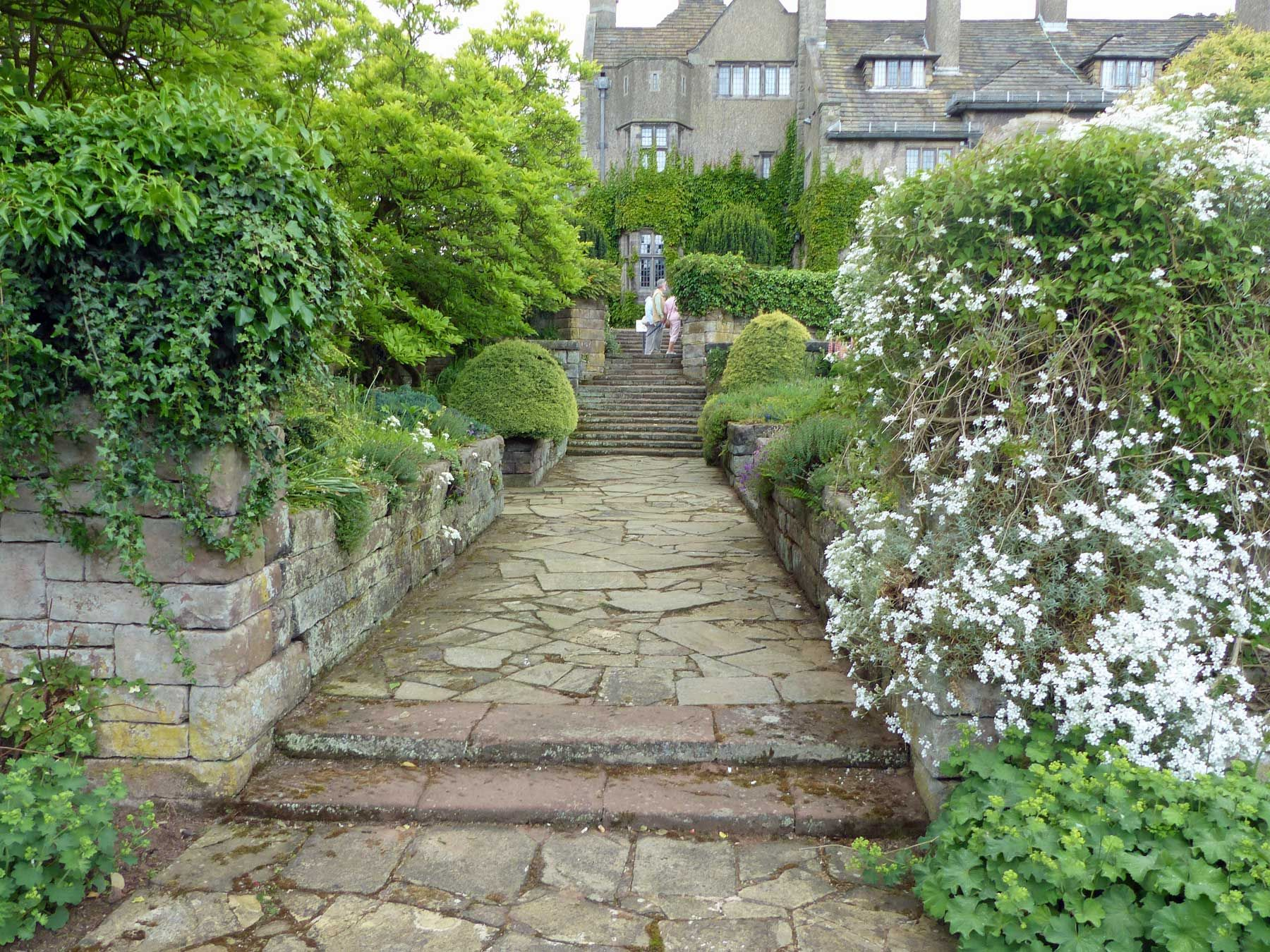
East terrace

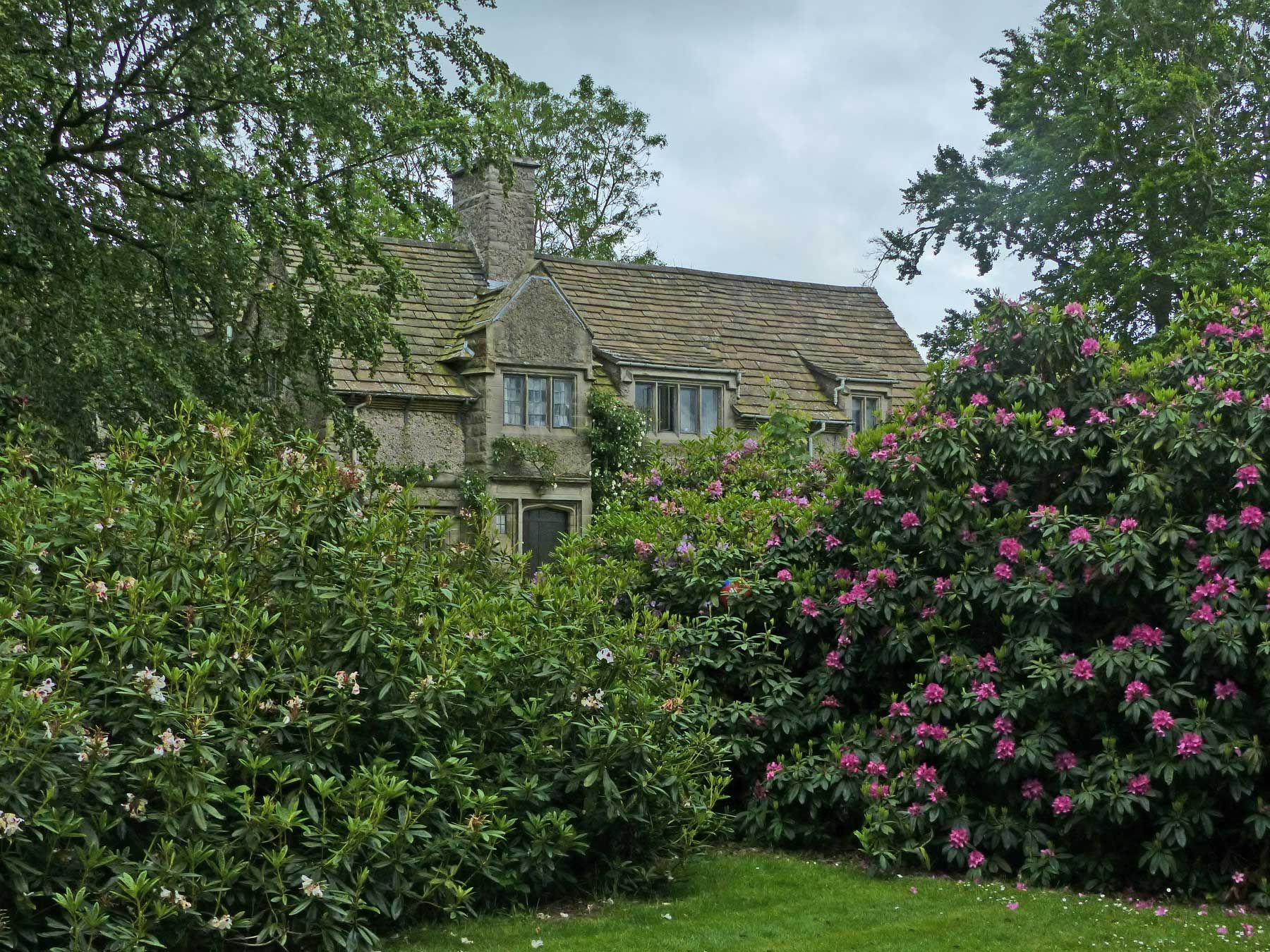
The Lodge

== See also ==
- Grade II* listed buildings in Cheshire West and Chester
- Listed buildings in Willington, Cheshire
