= Willington, Cheshire =

Village in Cheshire, England

Coordinates: 53.193°N 2.682°W

Willington
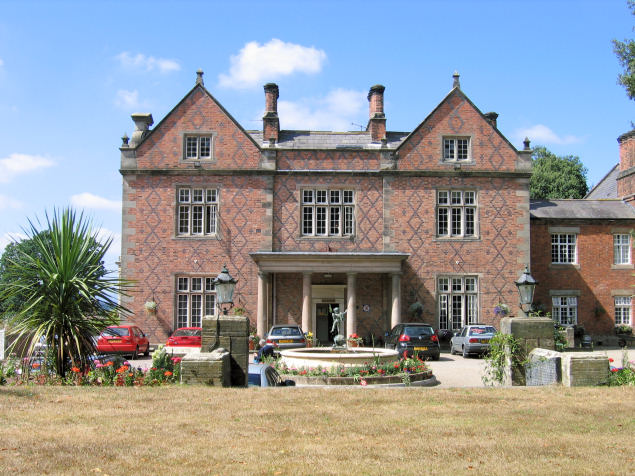
- Willington Hall

- Location within Cheshire
- Population: 277 (2011 census)
- Civil parish: Willington
- Unitary authority: Cheshire West and Chester
- Ceremonial county: Cheshire
- Region: North West
- Country: England
- Sovereign state: United Kingdom
- Post town: TARPORLEY
- Postcode district: CW6
- Dialling code: 01829
- Police: Cheshire
- Fire: Cheshire
- Ambulance: North West
- UK Parliament: Chester South and Eddisbury

Willington is a village and civil parish 9 miles (14 km) from Chester in Cheshire, England. At the 2011 census, the population was 277. (Note: the ONS/NOMIS website shows the 2011 population divided between Delamere and Duddon civil parishes.)

The village contains a public house (The Boot), farm shop and hotel (Willington Hall).

== History ==
The placename means "village of a woman called Winflǣd", from the Old English personal name Winflǣd, and the suffix tun for farm or village. The name was recorded in the Domesday Book as Winfletone, (under the ownership of Walter de Vernon and consisting of only two households), and then as Wynlaton in the 12th century.

Willington was previously an extra-parochial area in Eddisbury Hundred, which became a civil parish in 1866. From 1894 the civil parish was within Tarvin Rural District, transferring to the Chester district in 1974.

== Landmarks ==
The Boot Inn occupies a row of red-brick and sandstone cottages that were built in 1815. Behind the pub is Boothsdale, also known as 'Little Switzerland', accessible by a well-used footpath.

Willington Hall was built in 1829 and designed by the Nantwich architect George Latham. It is a designated Grade II listed building.

== See also ==
- Listed buildings in Willington, Cheshire
