= St Jude's Church, Tilstone Fearnall =

Coordinates: 53.1397°N 2.6503°W

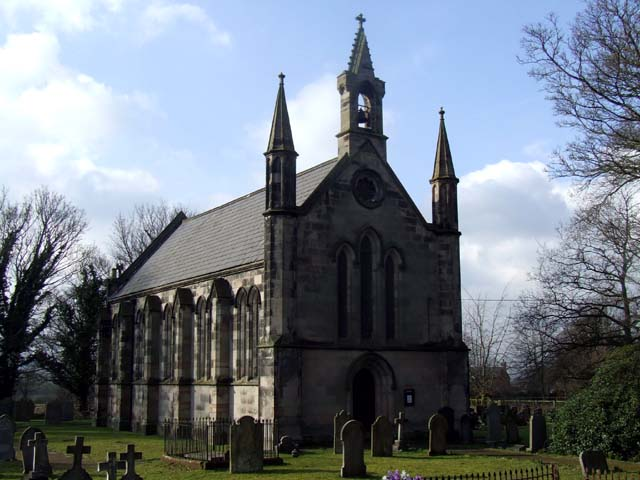
- St Jude's Church, Tilstone Fearnall, from the northwest

- Location in Cheshire
- OS grid reference: SJ 566 605
- Location: Nantwich Road, Tilstone Fearnall, Cheshire
- Country: England
- Denomination: Anglican
- Website: St Jude, Tilstone Fearnall

History
- Status: Parish church
- Dedication: Saint Jude

Architecture
- Functional status: Active
- Heritage designation: Grade II
- Designated: 3 April 1986
- Architect: George Latham
- Architectural type: Church
- Style: Gothic Revival
- Completed: 1836

Specifications
- Materials: Sandstone, slate roofs

Administration
- Province: York
- Diocese: Chester
- Archdeaconry: Chester
- Deanery: Malpas
- Parish: St Jude, Tilstone Fearnall

St Jude's Church is on Nantwich Road (the A51) in Tilstone Fearnall, in the civil parish of Tiverton and Tilstone Fearnall, Cheshire, England. It is an active Anglican parish church in the deanery of Malpas, the archdeaconry of Chester, and the diocese of Chester. Its benefice is combined with that of St Boniface, Bunbury. The church is recorded in the National Heritage List for England as a designated Grade II listed building. It stands opposite the end of the drive leading to Tilstone Lodge.

== History ==
The church was built in 1836, and designed by George Latham of Nantwich. It was paid for by Admiral John Tollemache (formerly Halliday), who had earlier built Tilstone Lodge.

== Architecture ==
St Jude's is constructed in yellow sandstone ashlar with a slate roof. Its plan is rectangular and consists of a nave and chancel in one cell with no division between them, a vestry attached to the east end of the chancel, and a bellcote on the gable at the west end. Above the bellcote is a canopy decorated with crockets. The west front contains a double door, above which is a triple lancet window with a circular window over it. At the corners are square turrets which become octagonal as they rise, and each is surmounted by a spire. On each side of the church are five pairs of lancet windows, each pair being separated by a buttress. Above the vestry at the east end is another triple lancet window, over which is a cricketed gable.

Inside the church is a west gallery. The reredos is carved with figures in low relief. There is a memorial to Admiral Tollemache, who died in 1837, and to his wife, who died in 1846. Stained glass dates from 1987. In the west gallery is a two-manual organ built by Peter Conacher and Company in 1914, and overhauled by the same company in 1965.

== External features ==
The churchyard contains the war graves of two soldiers of World War II.

== See also ==
- Listed buildings in Tilstone Fearnall
