= Tilstone Fearnall =

Village in Cheshire, England

Coordinates: 53.139°N 2.65°W

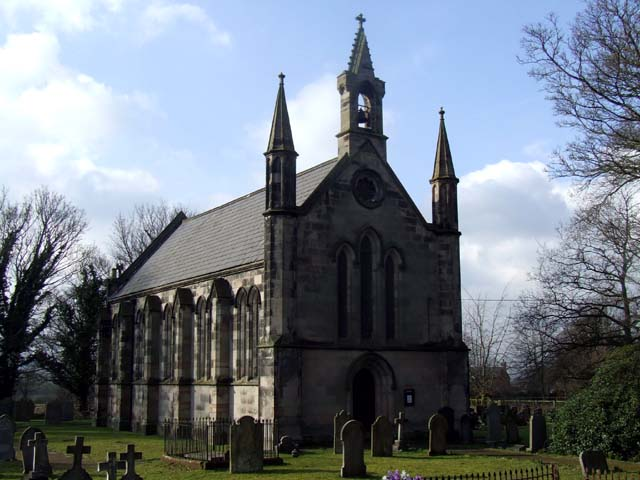
- St Jude's Church

- Location within Cheshire
- Population: 150 (2011)
- OS grid reference: SJ5660
- Civil parish: Tiverton and Tilstone Fearnall
- Unitary authority: Cheshire West and Chester
- Ceremonial county: Cheshire
- Region: North West
- Country: England
- Sovereign state: United Kingdom
- Post town: TARPORLEY
- Postcode district: CW6
- Dialling code: 01829
- Police: Cheshire
- Fire: Cheshire
- Ambulance: North West
- UK Parliament: Chester South and Eddisbury

Tilstone Fearnall is a village in the civil parish of Tiverton and Tilstone Fearnall, in the Cheshire West and Chester district and ceremonial county of Cheshire in England. In 2001 the parish had a population of 99, increasing to 150 at the 2011 census.

== Governance ==
Tilstone Fearnall was formerly a township and chapelry in the parish of Bunbury. In 1866 Tilstone Fearnall became a civil parish. On 1 April 2015 the parish was abolished to form "Tiverton and Tilstone Fearnall". Part also went to Rushton.

Nearby is the Grade II listed Tilstone Lodge, built between 1821 and 1825 by Thomas Harrison for Admiral John Tollemache (who changed his name from Halliday), the father of John Tollemache, 1st Baron Tollemache of Peckforton Castle.

== See also ==
- Listed buildings in Tilstone Fearnall
- St Jude's Church, Tilstone Fearnall
