= Congregational Chapel, Nantwich =

Church in Nantwich, Cheshire, England

Coordinates: 53.0671°N 2.5193°W

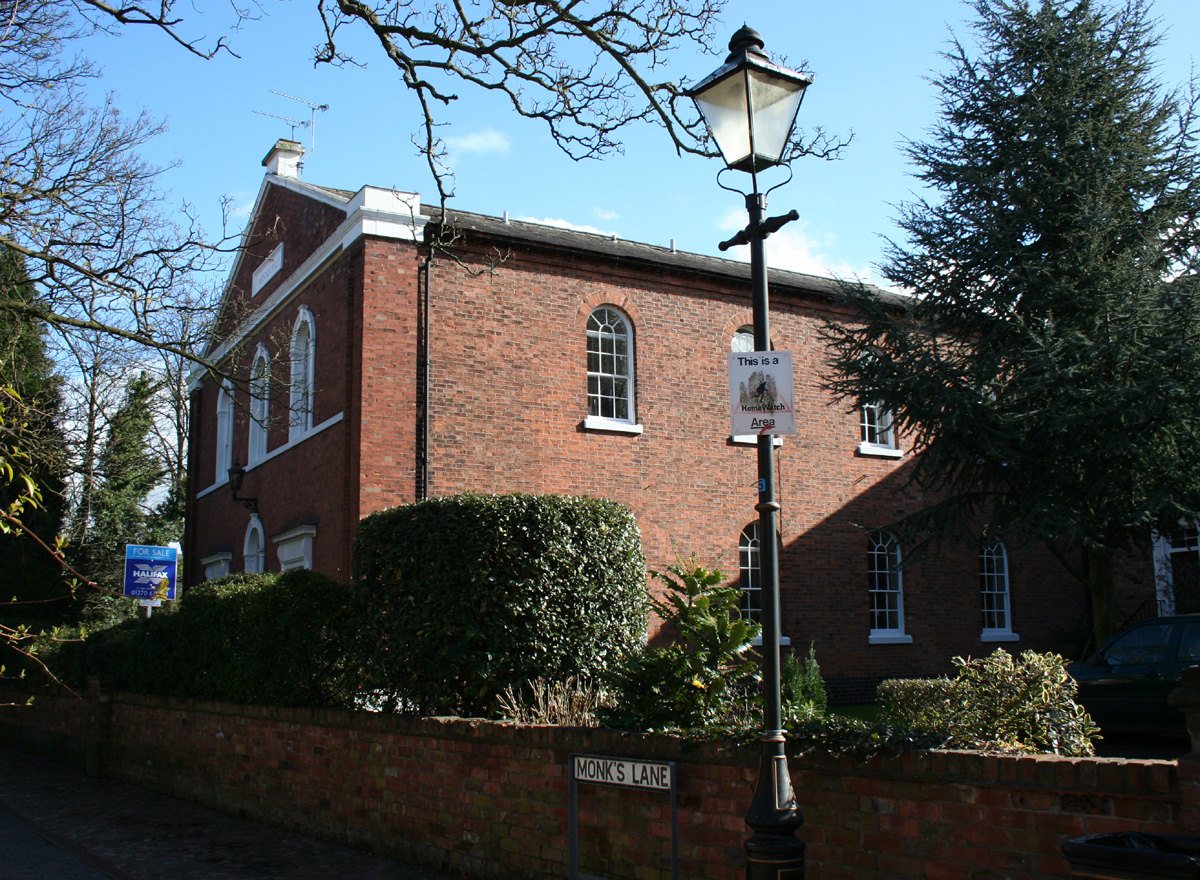
Former Congregational Chapel, Monks Lane, Nantwich

The Congregational Chapel, also known as the Independent Chapel, is a former Congregational or Independent church in Nantwich, Cheshire, England. It is located on Monks Lane (SJ 65297 52331), now a pedestrian walkway, opposite the Dysart Buildings and immediately north east of St Mary's Church. Built in 1841–42, with George Latham as the architect, it is listed at grade II. The chapel closed in the late 20th century, and the building has been converted to residential use.

== History ==
Early visits from Nonconformist preachers were not welcomed in Nantwich. In 1753, John Wesley was "saluted with curses and hard names", while that same year, George Whitefield was met by angry crowds who tried to drive a bull into his audience, but were foiled when the animal fell into a pit.

A society of Independents was formed in 1780 by Captain Jonathan Scott (1735–1807), who started preaching in a coachmaker's shop on Barker Street with the Reverend William Armitage from Chester. Captain Scott was a prominent independent evangelist who had resigned his commission in the 7th Dragoons in 1769 to focus on missionary work, and was ordained in 1774 or 1776 as a "presbyter or teacher at large". Born in Shrewsbury and then living in Wollerton in Shropshire, Scott went on preaching tours across Shropshire, Cheshire, Staffordshire, Lancashire and Wales during the 1770s. He is credited with involvement in the foundation of 22 Congregationalist churches. In 1794, Scott moved to Matlock in Derbyshire, but continued to preach in Nantwich every other Sunday. One of the early supporters of the Nantwich society was a local justice of the peace, Samuel Barrow, who donated £50 a year towards establishing a permanent ministry in 1796. The first minister is recorded from this date, and the first Independent chapel was built in 1801 on Church Lane. Scott later settled permanently in Nantwich, marrying Barrow's widow in 1802, and assisting the chapel's ministers until his death five years later.

The Independent congregation reached its height under the ministry of the Reverend J. Simson in 1840–51. A large chapel on Monks Lane was completed in 1842 at a cost of £2,200; the earlier building was retained as a Sunday School. The local architect George Latham was employed. The new chapel seated a congregation of around 700. The several other Nonconformist places of worship in the town in 1850 also included a Wesleyan Methodist Church and a Unitarian Chapel on Hospital Street, a Primitive Methodist Chapel on Welsh Row, a Baptist Chapel on Barker Street, a Friends' Meeting House on Pillory Street, and a Wesleyan Association Chapel on Castle Street. After 1851, the congregation went into substantial decline until at least the 1880s.

An organ was acquired at a cost of just under £400 in 1875. A meeting in May 1884 authorised the construction of a Sunday School building, which was constructed adjacent to the chapel on Monks Lane. A substantial red-brick building with stone dressings flanked by two low square towers, it was not completed until 1903. In 1890, the interior of the chapel was redecorated and new pews were added at a cost of £350.

In the 1970s, the chapel suffered from dry rot. It later closed, and the building has been converted into apartments. The Sunday School remained in use until the 1970s when it was also affected by dry rot; it was subsequently demolished.

== Description ==
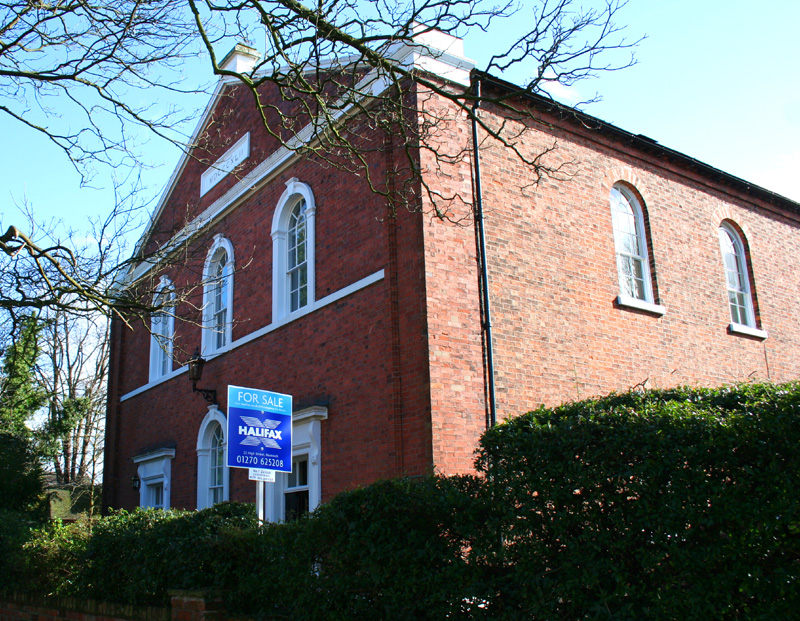
Front façade

The former Congregational Chapel is a two-storey building in red brick with stone dressings. The front façade has three bays topped with a pediment supported by large brick pilasters. The pediment bears a stone plaque inscribed with the date in Roman numerals. There are two doorways to the front, flanked by pilasters, which each have rectangular fanlights and cornices above, supported by corbels. Between the doorways is a central window and the main façade has three windows to the first floor; each has a semi-circular arched head with a keystone decoration. The front face also has a stone string course between the ground and first floors, and a cornice at the level of the pediment.

The side face has four bays; the windows have stone sills and semi-circular arched heads highlighted in brick. The interior (now altered) originally had a circular gallery.

== See also ==
- Listed buildings in Nantwich
- List of churches in Cheshire
- List of works by George Latham
