= Weaver Hall, Darnhall =

Country house in Darnhall, Cheshire, England

Coordinates: 53.17506°N 2.49584°W

Weaver Hall is an English country house in the parish of Darnhall, Cheshire. It was built in the early 17th century, largely rebuilt in the early 18th century, and remodelled in 1847. The house is constructed in brick with a slate roof. It has an H-shaped plan, and is in three storeys plus an attic. The entrance front has projecting gabled wings. The left wing contains two two-light windows in each storey, and a circular window in the gable. The interior has a baffle entry. The house is recorded in the National Heritage List for England as a designated Grade II listed building.

== See also ==
- Weaver Hall Museum and Workhouse
