= Willington Hall =

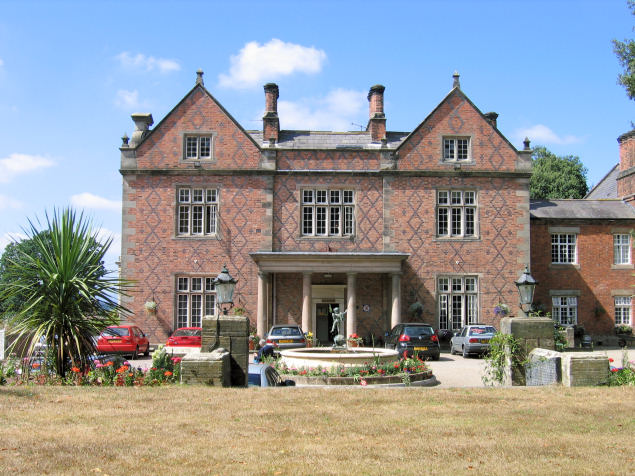
- Willington Hall, east front

- Location in Cheshire
- 53.18870°N 2.70053°W
- Location: Willington, Cheshire, England
- OS grid reference: SJ 533 660

History
- Built: 1829
- Built for: Major W. Tomkinson

Site notes
- Architect: George Latham
- Architectural style: Tudor Revival
- Restored: 1878

Listed Building – Grade II
- Designated: 8 November 1985
- Reference no.: 1137030

Willington Hall is a former country house in the parish of Willington, Cheshire, England. It was extended in 1878, but reduced in size in the 1950s, and has since been in use as a hotel.

== History ==
The house was built in 1829 by Major William Tomkinson on land purchased in 1827 from Lord Alvanley. Designed by Nantwich architect George Latham, in 1878 a new east front was added for William's son James Tomkinson. At the same time a new wing and stable blocks were added, and in the 1920s a laundry block was built. Although it escaped the fate of the destruction of country houses in 20th-century Britain, during the 1950s it was reduced in size, removing the 1878 east front and some of the outbuildings. In 1955 a portico was added, and it has since been in use as a hotel. The house is recorded in the National Heritage List for England as a designated Grade II listed building.

== Architecture ==
Willington Hall is constructed in orange brick with buff sandstone dressings and a Welsh slate roof. The brickwork is decorated with diapering in blue brick. The architectural style is described as Jacobean, or Neo-Elizabethan. The building is square in plan, plus a wing to the north. It has two storeys and an attic. The façades are symmetrical The garden front faces south and consists of three bays. The lateral bays contain canted bay windows and have shaped gables. The windows are mullioned and transomed. The entrance bay faces east and also has three bays, the lateral bays having triangular gables. At the front of the central bay is a porch with four Tuscan columns.

== Associated structures ==
There are two structures associated with the hall that are also Grade II listed buildings. The first is a sundial in the garden dating from about 1830 and constructed in ashlar buff sandstone. The other consists of the south and east walls of the terrace, that are also in sandstone.

== See also ==
- Listed buildings in Willington, Cheshire
