= Primitive Methodist Chapel, Nantwich =

Church in Cheshire, England

Coordinates: 53.0675°N 2.5297°W

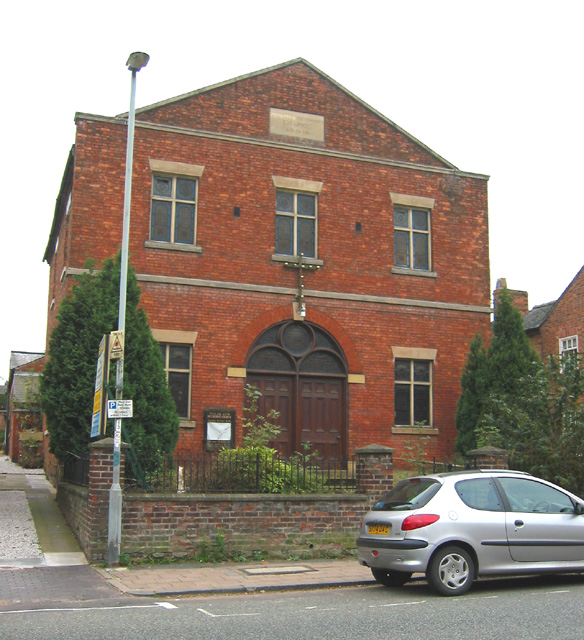
Former Primitive Methodist Chapel, Welsh Row, Nantwich

The Primitive Methodist Chapel is a former Primitive Methodist church on Welsh Row in Nantwich, Cheshire, England (at SJ6460252372). Built in 1840, it is listed at grade II. The chapel closed in 2001, and the building has been partially converted to residential use.

== History ==
Early visits from Nonconformist preachers were not welcomed in Nantwich. In 1753, John Wesley was "saluted with curses and hard names", while that same year, George Whitefield was met by angry crowds who tried to drive a bull into his audience, but were foiled when the animal fell into a pit.

William Clowes, one of the founders of Primitive Methodism, came to Nantwich with John Wedgewood and preached at The Barony in 1817. A building on Marsh Lane was purchased in 1826 for £100 and was used as a chapel until 1840, when the chapel on Welsh Row was built by Thomas Bateman. The Welsh Row site, donated by George Wilbraham, was a former cloth merchants' hall. Opening on 21 October 1840, the Welsh Row chapel seated a congregation of 600. It originally fell within the Burland Primitive Methodist circuit, but in 1844 a minister was appointed in Nantwich and the town became the centre of the circuit. The several other Nonconformist places of worship in the town in 1850 also included a Wesleyan Methodist Church and a Unitarian Chapel on Hospital Street, an Independent or Congregational Chapel on Monks Lane, a Baptist Chapel on Barker Street, a Friends' Meeting House on Pillory Street, and a Wesleyan Association Chapel on Castle Street. A second Primitive Methodist chapel, the Wood Memorial Chapel, was built in 1881 at The Barony by John Wood.

After the Methodist Union in 1932, the Welsh Row chapel became one of several Methodist places of worship in Nantwich. In 1966, three other Methodist chapels merged to form the Central Methodist Church in Nantwich, which worshipped at the former Wesleyan Methodist Church on Hospital Street. In 2000, the Welsh Row congregation also merged into the Central Methodist Church to form Nantwich Methodist Church. The Welsh Row chapel closed in 2001.

As of 2010, the rear of the building on Chapel Row is used for housing, but the main chapel is derelict.

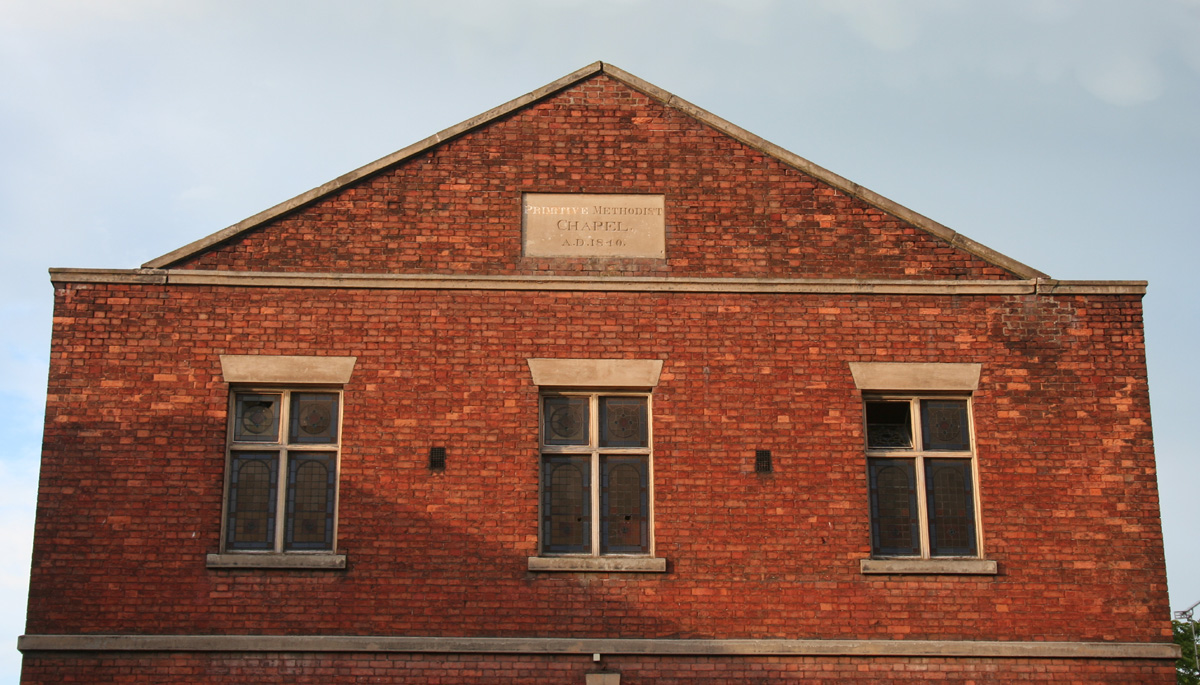
Detail of pediment and tablet

== Description ==
The Primitive Methodist Chapel is a two-storey building in red brick with stone dressings, which is set back from the street behind a walled forecourt. The front façade has three bays with a pediment bearing a stone tablet with the inscription "Primitive Methodist Chapel. A.D. 1840." This face also has a stone string course and cornice. The wide central entrance is reached by a flight of steps; it has decorative stone inserts, a semi-circular brick arch above and a fanlight. The windows have undecorated stone lintels and sills.

== See also ==
- Listed buildings in Nantwich
- List of churches in Cheshire
