= Charles Edward Mallows =

English architect and landscape architect

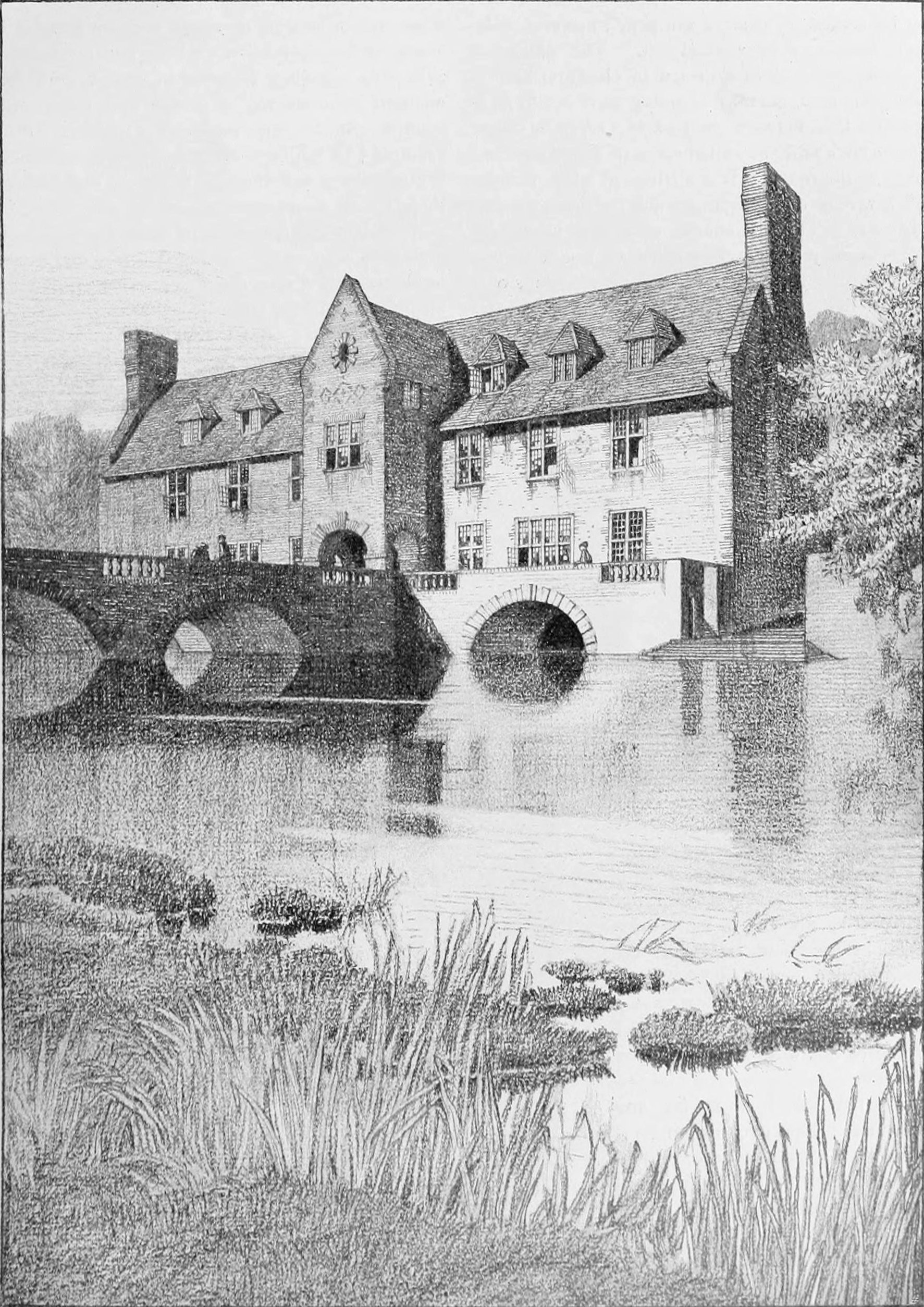
House with a bridge approach. An imaginary project designed by C. E. Mallows and F. L. Griggs, drawn by F. L. Griggs.

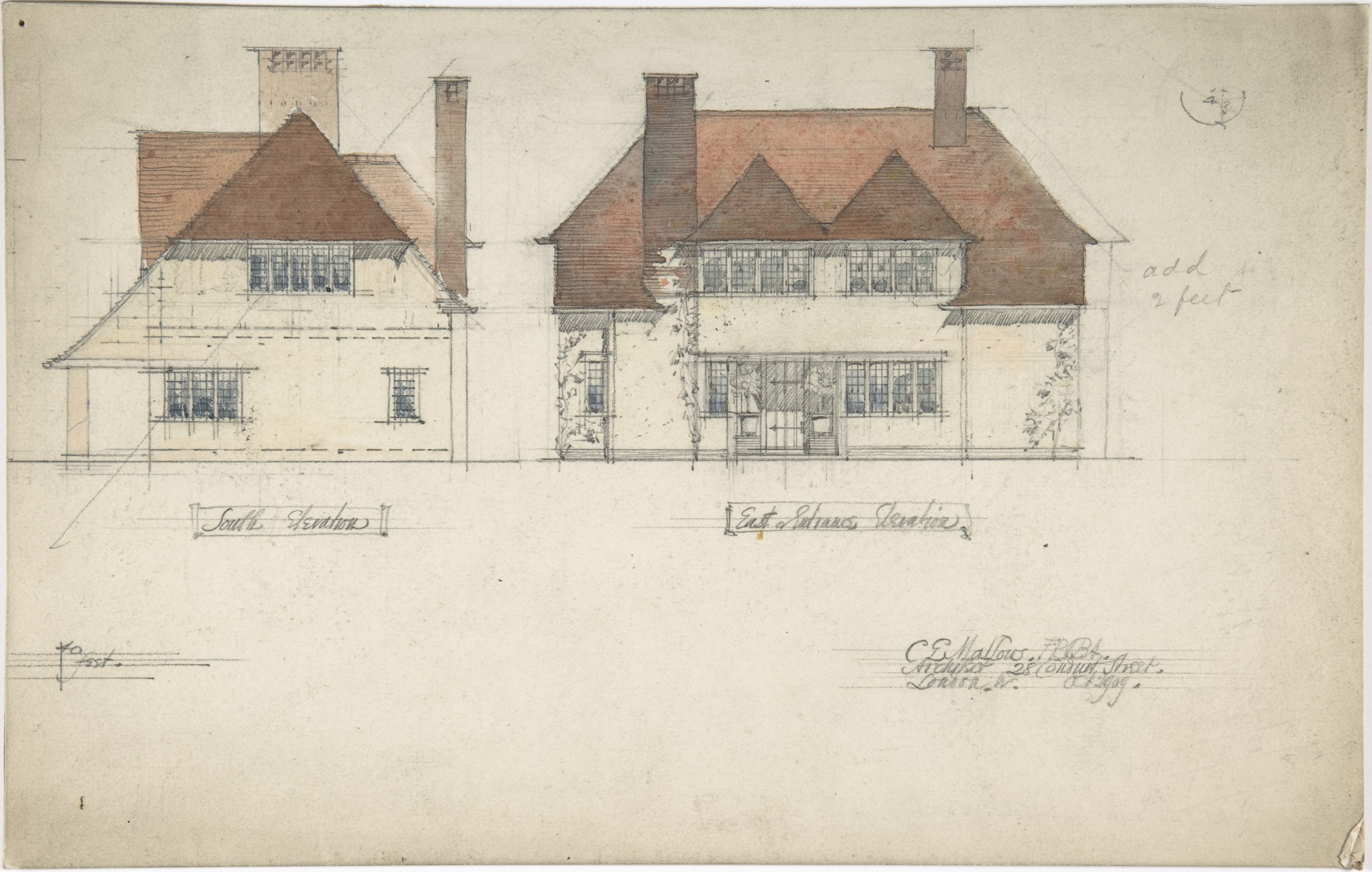
South Elevation and East or Entrance Elevation of a House, by Charles Edward Mallows, 1909

Charles Edward Mallows FRIBA (5 May 1864 – 2 June 1915), often known as C. E. Mallows, was an English architect and landscape architect. He is considered to be part of the Arts and Craft movement in British art.

== Biography ==
Mallows was born in Chelsea, London, and spent his childhood at Flatford Mill, East Bergholt, Suffolk, where his uncle ran the mill. He studied in Bedford and London.

In 1895 he opened an office in Bedford with George Grocock and worked in the Arts and Crafts tradition designing cottages, schools, shops and restoring churches including the Trinity chapel of St Paul's Church, Bedford. He was made a fellow of the Royal Institute of British Architects in 1900 and by the following year was the diocesan surveyor for Ely. Mallows rented rooms adjoining those of the landscape architect Thomas Hayton Mawson, and occasionally worked with him.

He died on 2 June 1915 at his home in Biddenham, Bedfordshire, leaving an estate of nearly £3,000.

== Works ==
Mallows's major commission was Tirley Garth in Cheshire, where, from 1907, he designed the house and the major part of the gardens.

He remodelled the house and gardens of Cannons in Stanmore, London, between 1905 and 1908. The gardens were considered by some to be the greatest to be designed in the Edwardian era.

He also designed Joyce Grove in Oxfordshire for Robert Fleming between 1903 and 1908.

From 1914 until his death, Mallows designed the house and gardens at Craig-y-parc, Pentyrch, Glamorgan, for the colliery owner Thomas Evans.

Photographs contributed by Mallows to the Conway Library are currently being digitised by the Courtauld Institute of Art, as part of the Courtauld Connects project.
