= Weaver Hall Museum and Workhouse =

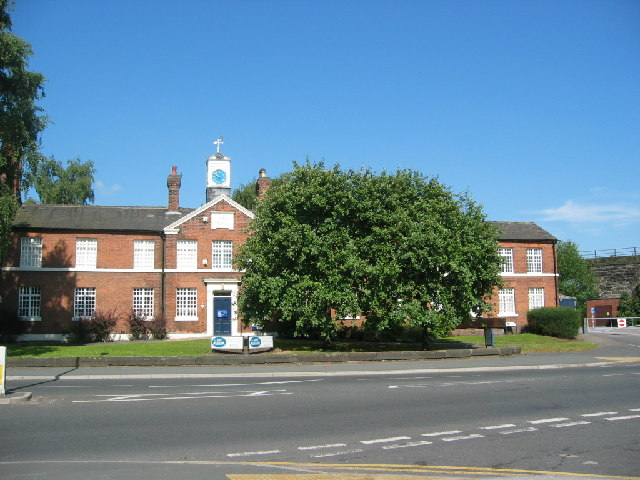

- Location in Cheshire
- 53.2540°N 2.5136°W
- Location: 162 London Road, Northwich, Cheshire, England
- OS grid reference: SJ 658 731

History
- Built: 1839

Site notes
- Architect: George Latham

Listed Building – Grade II
- Designated: 8 July 1969
- Reference no.: 1161095

The Weaver Hall Museum and Workhouse, Northwich, Cheshire, records the social, cultural and industrial history of West Cheshire. Formerly known as the Salt Museum, its early focus was on the history of salt extraction, a local industry dating back to Roman times. The museum was renamed Weaver Hall Museum and Workhouse in 2010 as its remit now extends to cover the broader history of the area and also the history of the building itself as a former workhouse.

The museum is located in the building of the old Northwich Union Workhouse, dating from 1839 and situated on the A533 road. It is recorded in the National Heritage List for England as a Grade II listed building.

== Current museum ==
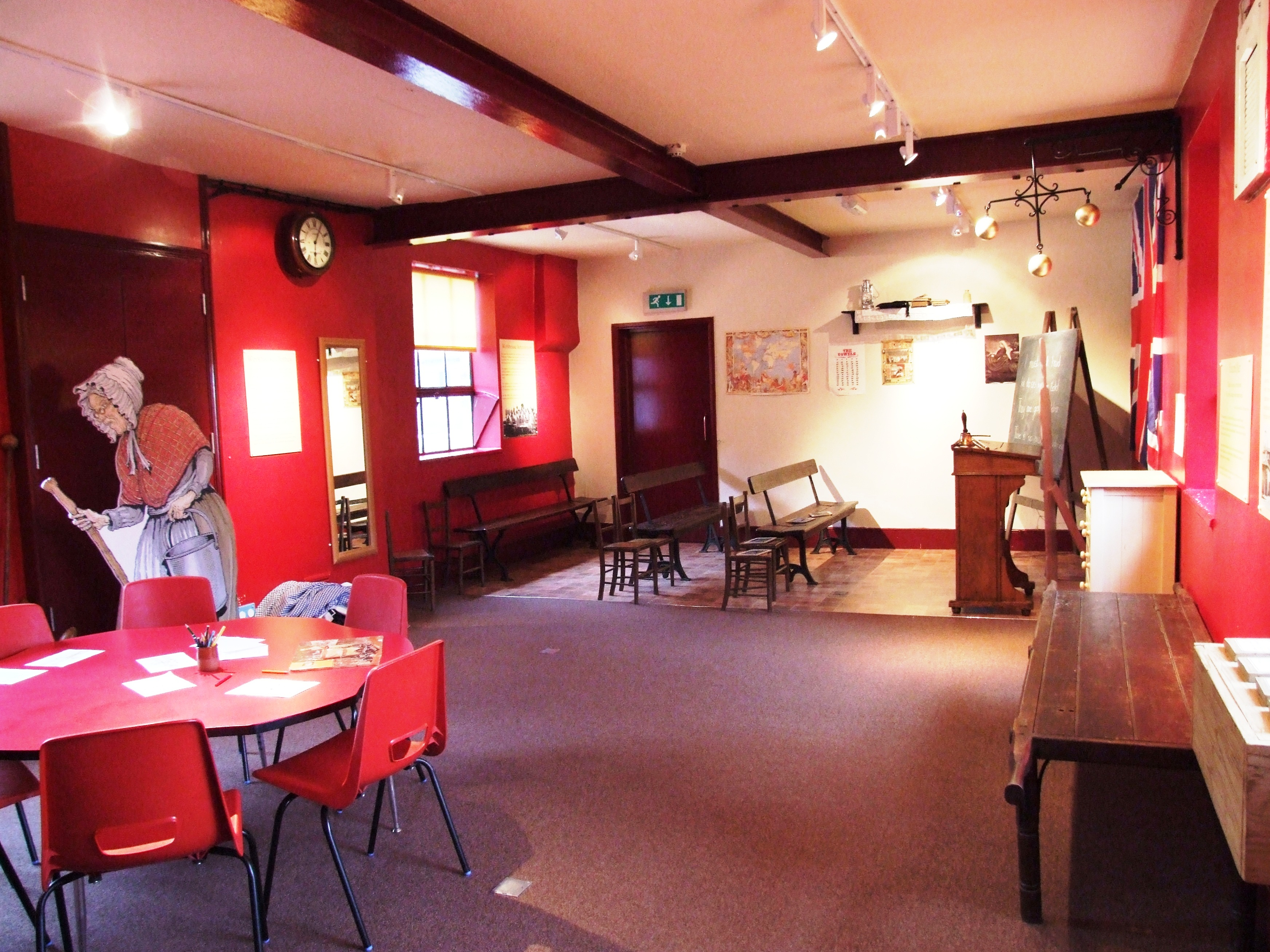
Display in former Workhouse Schoolroom

Weaver Hall Museum houses a large collection covering the archaeology, architecture and industries of Cheshire from prehistory to the present. Permanent displays include a Victorian workhouse schoolroom and the Board of Guardians boardroom.

The museum also holds an image library of more than 8000 items recording the history of west Cheshire, particularly in relation to the salt and chemical industries and associated canal transport.

In addition to regular displays of items from its own collections the museum also hosts visiting exhibitions, art exhibitions, special events, holiday activities, talks and regular film shows in its own mini-cinema, the Regalette, (named in honour of the town's last surviving cinema the Regal, which closed in 2007.)

In 2009 more than 20,000 people visited Weaver Hall.

== Origins and history of Weaver Hall Museum ==
=== History ===
The first salt museum was set up in the 19th century by Thomas Ward and John Brunner, two local salt proprietors, who felt the town needed something to explain its status as the then "salt capital of the world". Ward and Brunner donated the library and museum to the town in 1887.

The museum collection originally shared a building with Northwich library but mine subsidence – once a significant problem in the town – caused this to collapse. A new combined library-and-museum building was put up in 1909. This building still exists but now houses only Northwich library, though the former title over the door remains.

The collection was moved into its current premises in the former workhouse building at Weaver Hall in June 1981, in large part thanks to the efforts of Mary, Lady Rochester, who played a leading role in its early establishment. It opened under the name of The Salt Museum and displayed exhibits that particularly illustrated the history of the salt industry and its impact on the area.

The appointment of Matt Wheeler as Curator in 2004 led to an enhanced programme of special exhibitions and events and prompted a significant rise in visitor numbers. Special exhibitions included 2009's 'Above the Clouds: Mallory & Irvine and the Quest for Everest' featuring many artefacts sourced from a range of institutions (including the Royal Geographical Society) and individuals relating to the two Cheshire born Everest explorers, George Mallory and Andrew ('Sandy') Irvine. It represented one of the most comprehensive exhibitions ever conducted on Mallory and Irvine and was shortlisted at the British Museum and Heritage Awards for Excellence.

In 2010 the proposed redevelopment of a second museum based nearby at the former Lion Salt Works encouraged restructuring, and the museum to adopt its current name of the Weaver Hall Museum and Workhouse. Its focus was also enlarged to cover the broader history of the west Cheshire region.

=== Building ===
The building which was eventually to become known as Weaver Hall was opened in 1839 in response to the Poor Law Amendment Act 1834, which standardized the system of poor relief throughout England and Wales. Groups of parishes were combined into unions which were responsible for providing for the poor and needy in the area. The law forbade all relief to the able-bodied in their own homes; anyone wishing to receive aid had to live in a workhouse, in which the harsh conditions were intended to encourage the able-bodied poor to seek employment rather than rely on charity.

The Northwich Union Workhouse was commissioned in 1837, after 65 local parishes and townships comprising nearly the whole of mid-Cheshire were combined in October 1836 into a single union. The building was designed by architect George Latham to a standard model. In 1850 a fever hospital was added, and in 1863 better receiving wards – with proper baths – were installed. Poor Law Unions and their Guardians were abolished in April 1930, when Northwich Workhouse transferred to Cheshire County Council as a public assistance institution.

In 1948 the building became the Weaver Hall Old People’s Home. Most of the workhouse buildings were demolished in the 1960s, but an original range of rooms fronting London Road remained, along with an adjoining Board of Guardians room built in 1892. The main building ceased to be an old people's home in 1968, when residents were moved to a purpose-built facility at the rear.

== See also ==
- Salt in Cheshire
- Open pan salt making
- Weaver Hall, Darnhall
