= Wesleyan Methodist Church, Nantwich =

Church in Cheshire, England

Coordinates: 53.0663°N 2.5191°W

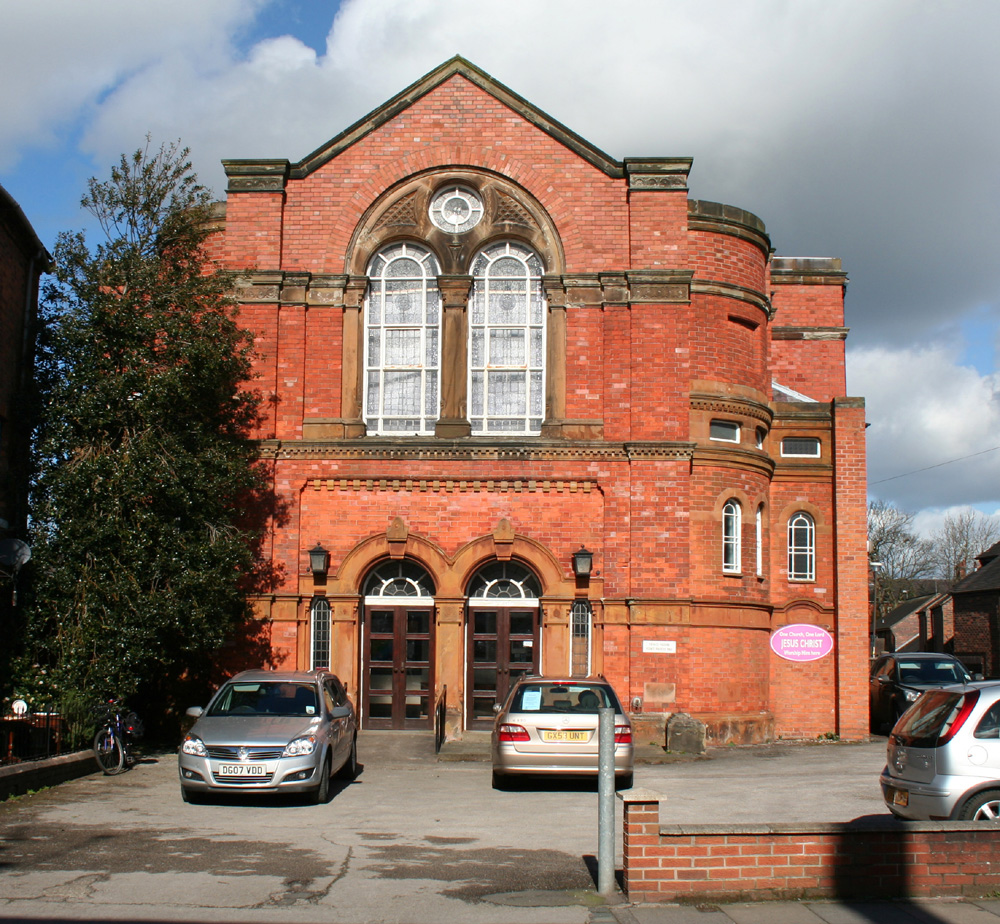
Former Wesleyan Methodist Church, Hospital Street, Nantwich

The Wesleyan Methodist Church, also known as the Wesleyan Chapel, is a former Wesleyan Methodist church on Hospital Street, Nantwich, Cheshire, England (at SJ6531052249). Built in 1808, a new façade was added in 1876. The church then seated over a thousand, and was the largest Nonconformist place of worship in the town in the 1880s. It is listed at grade II. The church closed in 2009, after the congregation moved to the former Methodist schoolrooms opposite.

== History ==
Early visits from Nonconformist preachers were not welcomed in Nantwich. In 1753, John Wesley was "saluted with curses and hard names", while that same year, George Whitefield was met by angry crowds who tried to drive a bull into his audience, but were foiled when the animal fell into a pit. A Methodist congregation was in existence by 1777. Members originally worshipped in a chapel on Barker Street, which later became a Baptist chapel. Wesley preached there twice, on 6 April 1779 and 17 May 1781. In 1789, the congregation numbered only 23.

Rapid growth took place in the subsequent few decades, with the congregation reaching 200 by 1806. The society then purchased a site on Hospital Street for £700, on which they built a church and two preachers' houses, at a cost of £3,300. The Wesleyan Methodist Church opened on 13 November 1808, and seated a congregation of around 900. Originally included in the Chester Methodist circuit, in 1808 Nantwich became the centre of a circuit which included Alsager, Bickerton, Buerton and Winsford, and, until 1869, the new town of Crewe.

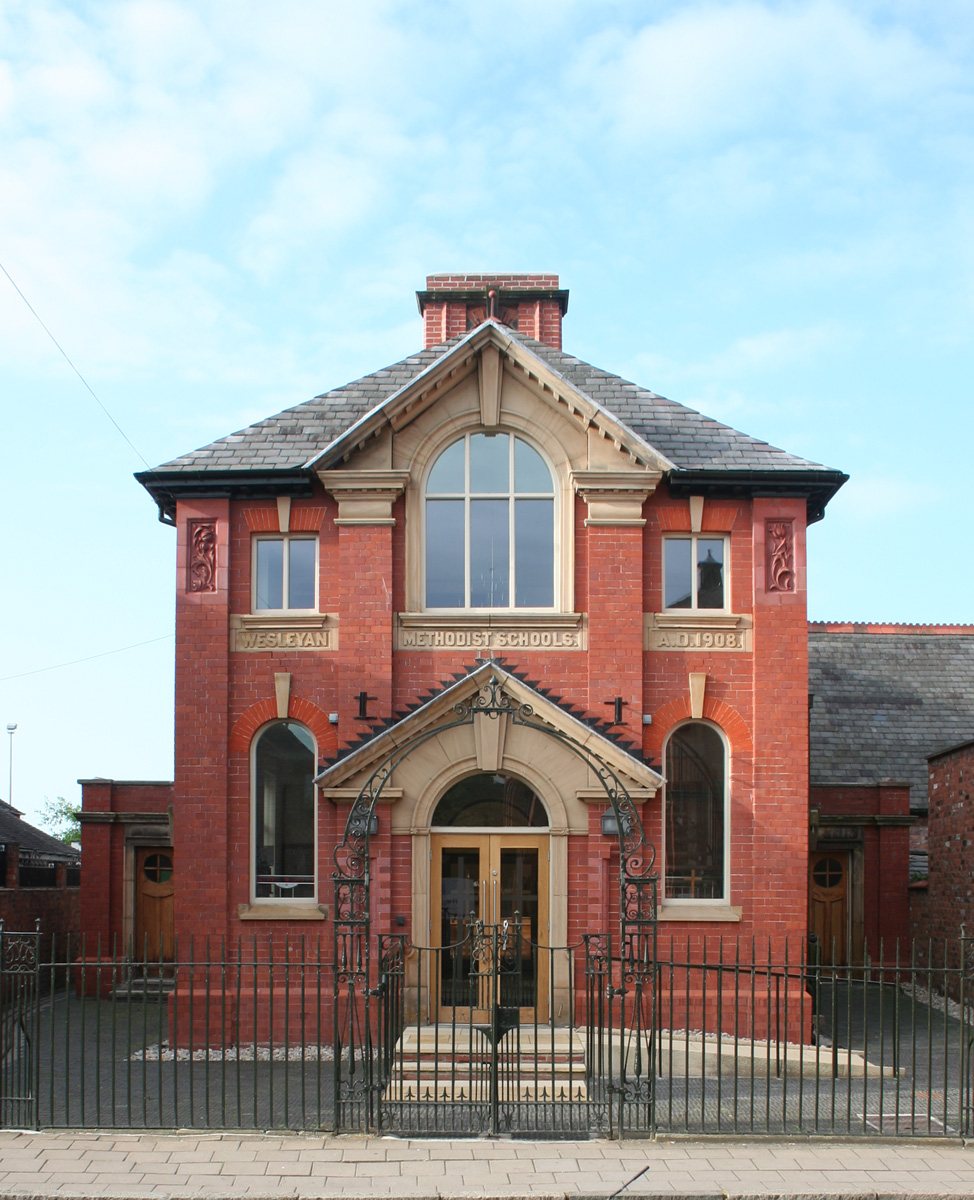
1909 schoolrooms; since 2009, the Methodist Church

In 1835, a split occurred and several congregation members were expelled; they formed the Wesleyan Methodist Association, which met on Castle Street. In the mid-19th century, the several other Nonconformist places of worship in the town also included a Primitive Methodist Chapel on Welsh Row, a Unitarian Chapel on Hospital Street, an Independent or Congregational Chapel on Monks Lane, a Baptist Chapel on Barker Street, and a Friends' Meeting House on Pillory Street.

In 1858, the church was improved with the addition of vestries at a cost of £400. A new Sweetland organ was purchased for £300 in 1859. The church was substantially altered and enlarged in 1876 at a cost of around £2,300, with the addition of a new façade and new pews on the interior; it then seated over a thousand. (The total population of Nantwich in 1871 was 6,673.) In 1883, it was the largest chapel in the town. A new organ was installed in 1911.

An elementary day school was constructed in 1840 on Hospital Street, opposite the church, which also doubled as the Sunday school; by 1873 it was teaching both boys and girls to read. On 3 January 1908, the school burned down and was replaced with the existing building, which opened on 27 September 1909 at a cost of £2,000, raised by the local circuit. The new building was used as a Sunday school rather than a day school.

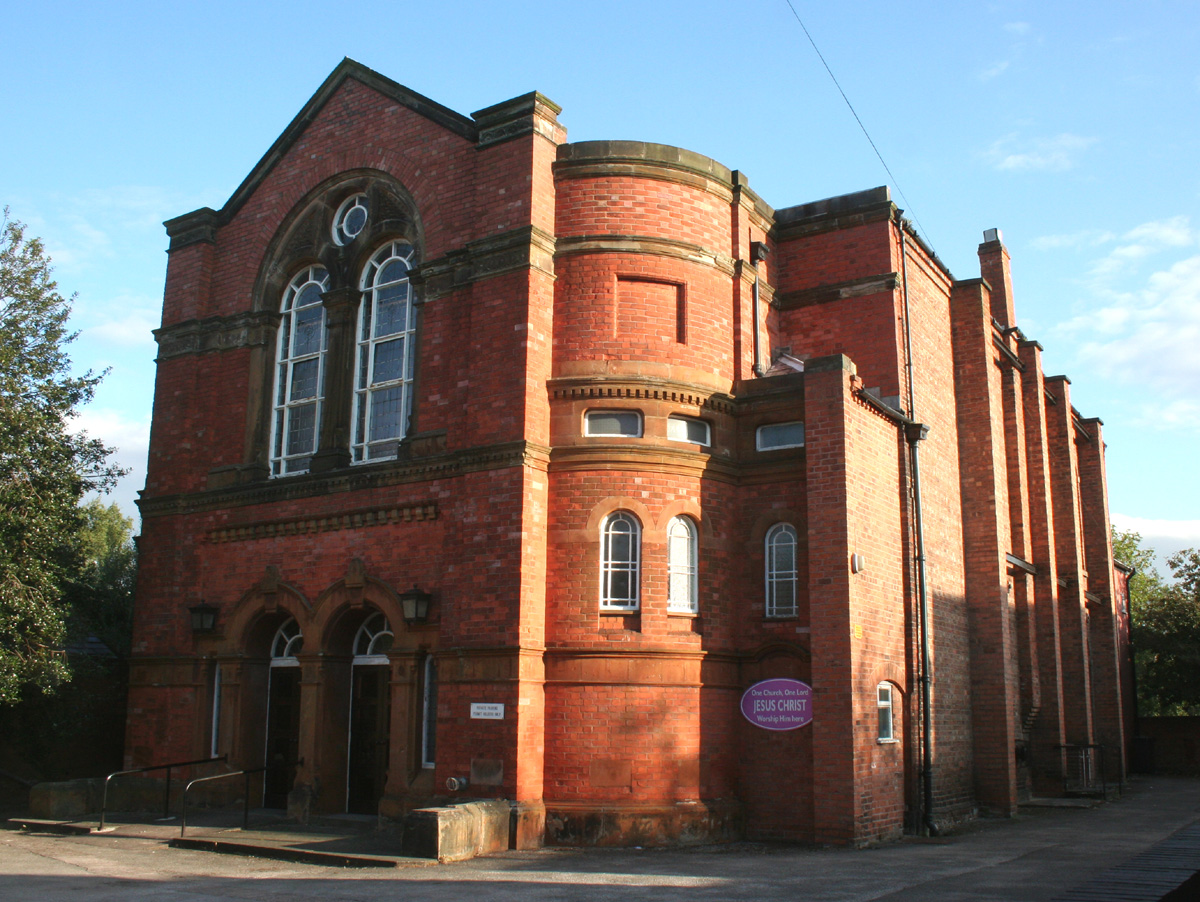
Former church: side view

After the Methodist Union in 1932, the Hospital Street church became one of several Methodist places of worship in Nantwich. In 1966, it merged with the Pillory Street Methodist Chapel and the Wood Memorial Chapel on The Barony to form the Central Methodist Church of Nantwich, which worshipped at the Hospital Street church. In 2000, the Welsh Row Chapel also merged into the Central Methodist Church to form Nantwich Methodist Church.

The congregation moved to the former Methodist schoolrooms opposite in 2009. As of 2010, the former church stands empty; conversion of part of the building into offices has been approved.

== Description ==
The former Wesleyan Methodist Church is a two-storey building in red brick, which is set well back from the street. The front façade is gabled, with stone dressings, and is flanked with tall brick pilasters. This face has a recess at ground level containing two adjacent doorways, which have stone surrounds with pilasters and decorative keystones, and semi-circular arched heads with fanlights; the doorways are flanked by two narrow windows. Above the doors is another large arched recess, faced in stone, which contains two large arched windows flanked by pilasters, with a smaller circular window above. There are two stone string courses and a stone cornice. The façade is flanked by circular bays, which have two small windows with semi-circular heads.

== See also ==
- Listed buildings in Nantwich
- List of churches in Cheshire
