= Wistaston =

Village and civil parish in Cheshire, England

Coordinates: 53.0821°N 2.4747°W

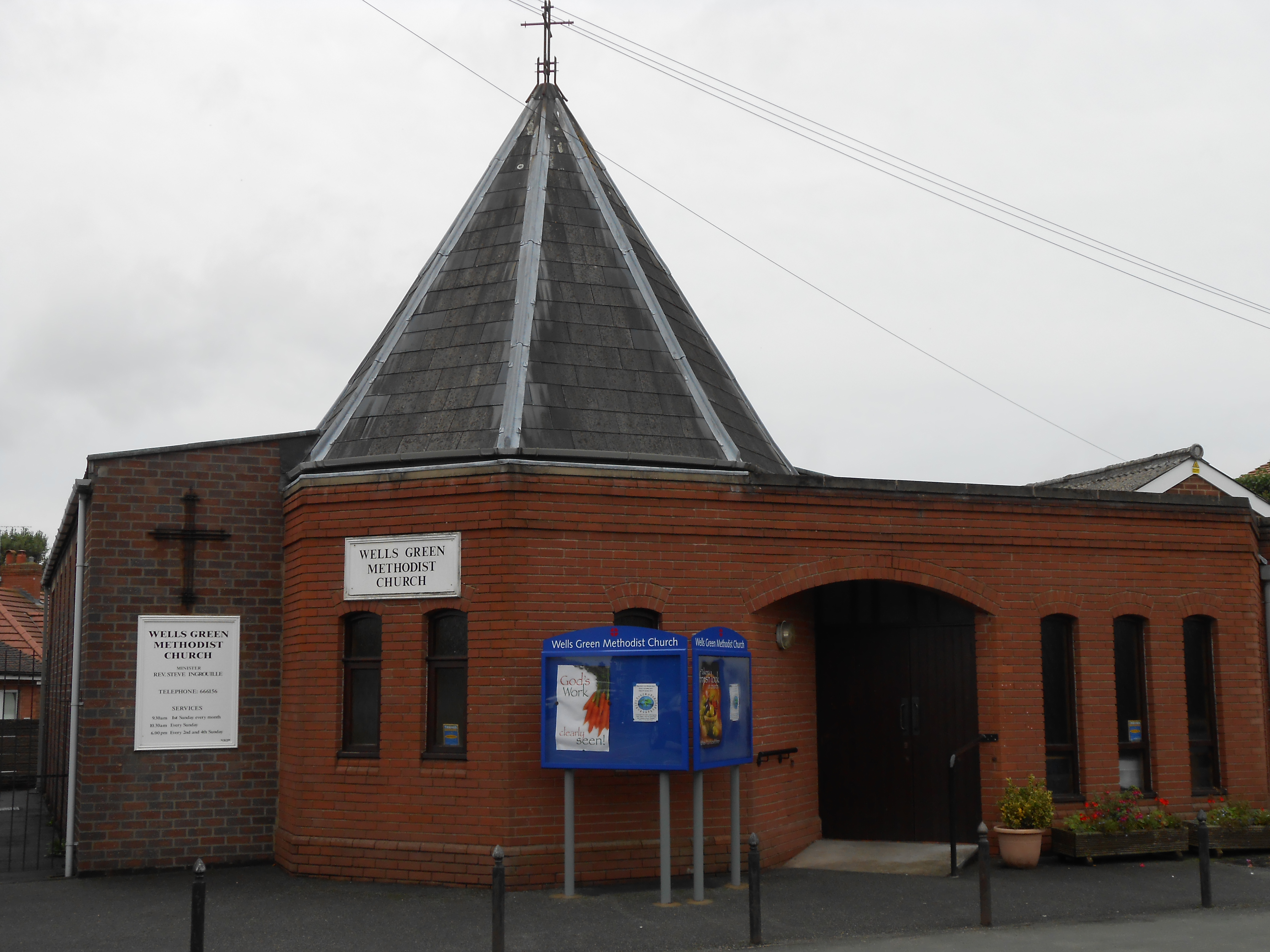
- Wells Green Methodist Church

- Location within Cheshire
- Population: 8,117 (2011)
- OS grid reference: SJ682539
- Civil parish: Wistaston
- Unitary authority: Cheshire East
- Ceremonial county: Cheshire
- Region: North West
- Country: England
- Sovereign state: United Kingdom
- Post town: CREWE
- Postcode district: CW2
- Dialling code: 01270
- Police: Cheshire
- Fire: Cheshire
- Ambulance: North West
- UK Parliament: Crewe and Nantwich

Wistaston is a village and civil parish in the unitary authority of Cheshire East and the ceremonial county of Cheshire, North West England. It is sited approximately 2 miles (3.2 km) west of Crewe town centre and 3 miles (4.8 km) east of Nantwich. It had a population of 8,222, reducing to 8,117 at the 2011 Census.

== History ==
In the Domesday Survey of 1086, the area was called Wistanestune and was a going concern having a population of 25 to 30 people, valuable woodland and arable land, and deer roaming about. It had been worth 30 shillings, but after William the Conqueror's devastation of Cheshire, it was worth just ten shillings in 1086. It was one of several local villages with the suffix ‘tune’ or ‘ton’ - meaning a ‘farmstead’.

== Awards ==
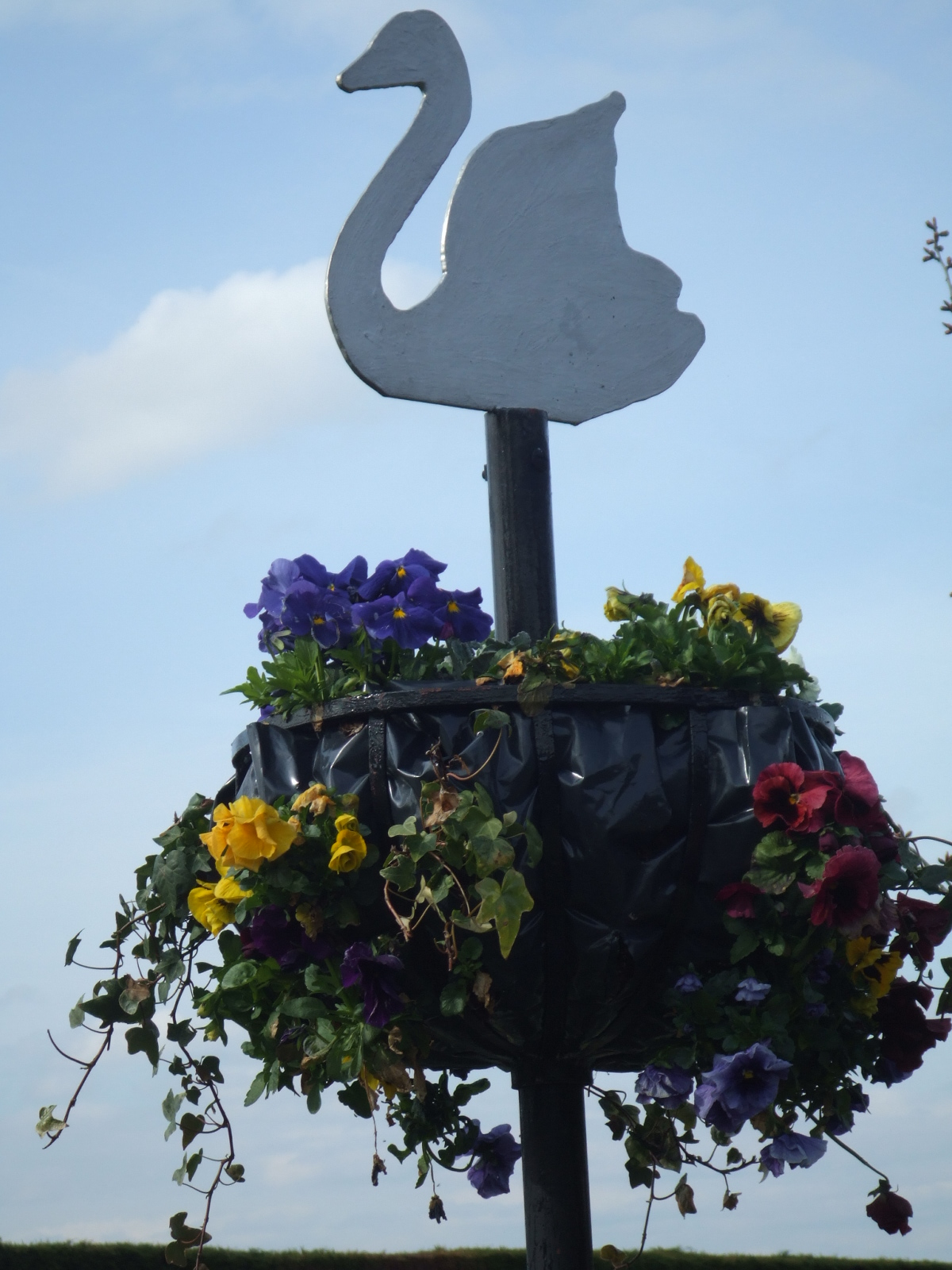
Wistaston in Bloom - flowerbed opposite Memorial Hall

The village has won the following awards, Cheshire Community Council ‘Best Kept Village Competition’ (1984, 1988, 1998, 1999, 2000, 2019), Civic Pride Award (1993, 1994, 1995) and Cheshire Community Council ‘Community Pride’ (2005).

== Parish council ==
Wistaston Parish Council is made up of 12 elected councillors in three wards (Wistaston Green, St Mary's, and Wells Green). The current Chairman of the Parish Council is Councillor John Moore. The Parish Council holds monthly meetings in the Memorial Hall, to which all Wistonians are invited.

== Local schools ==
There are two primary schools in the parish, Wistaston Church Lane Academy and St Mary’s Catholic Primary.

== Events ==
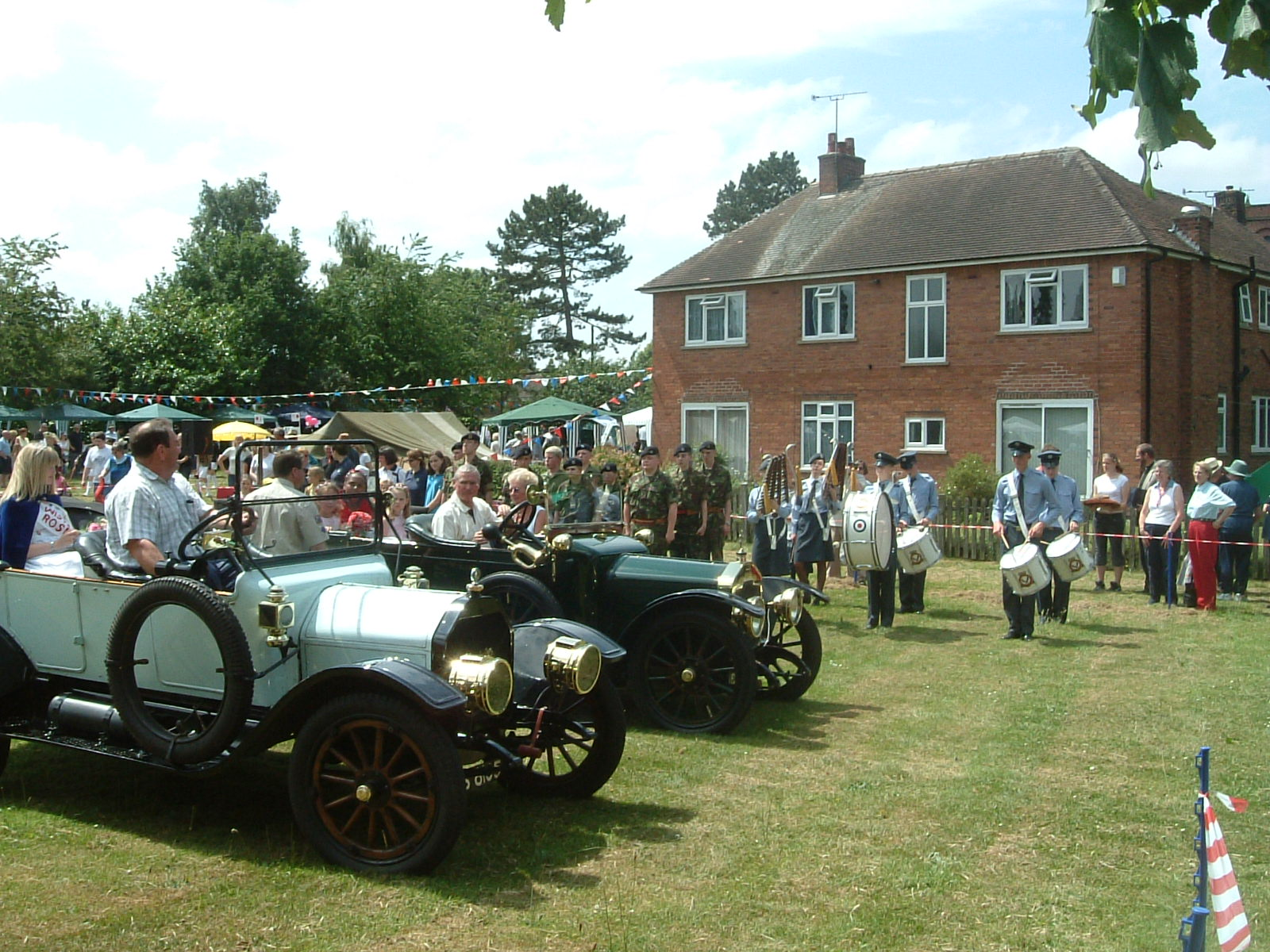
Wistaston Village Fete, within the grounds of St Mary's Church Rectory

Events held in the village include:

- Village Fete (includes crowning of the Rose Queen, as well as Wistonian of the Year) - formerly held every year at St Mary's Church Rectory in mid-June. Since the Rectory grounds were sold to housing developers, the Fete has been held at Wistaston Church Lane Academy School
- Flower and Produce Show - held every year at St Mary's Church Hall in August.

== Sport ==
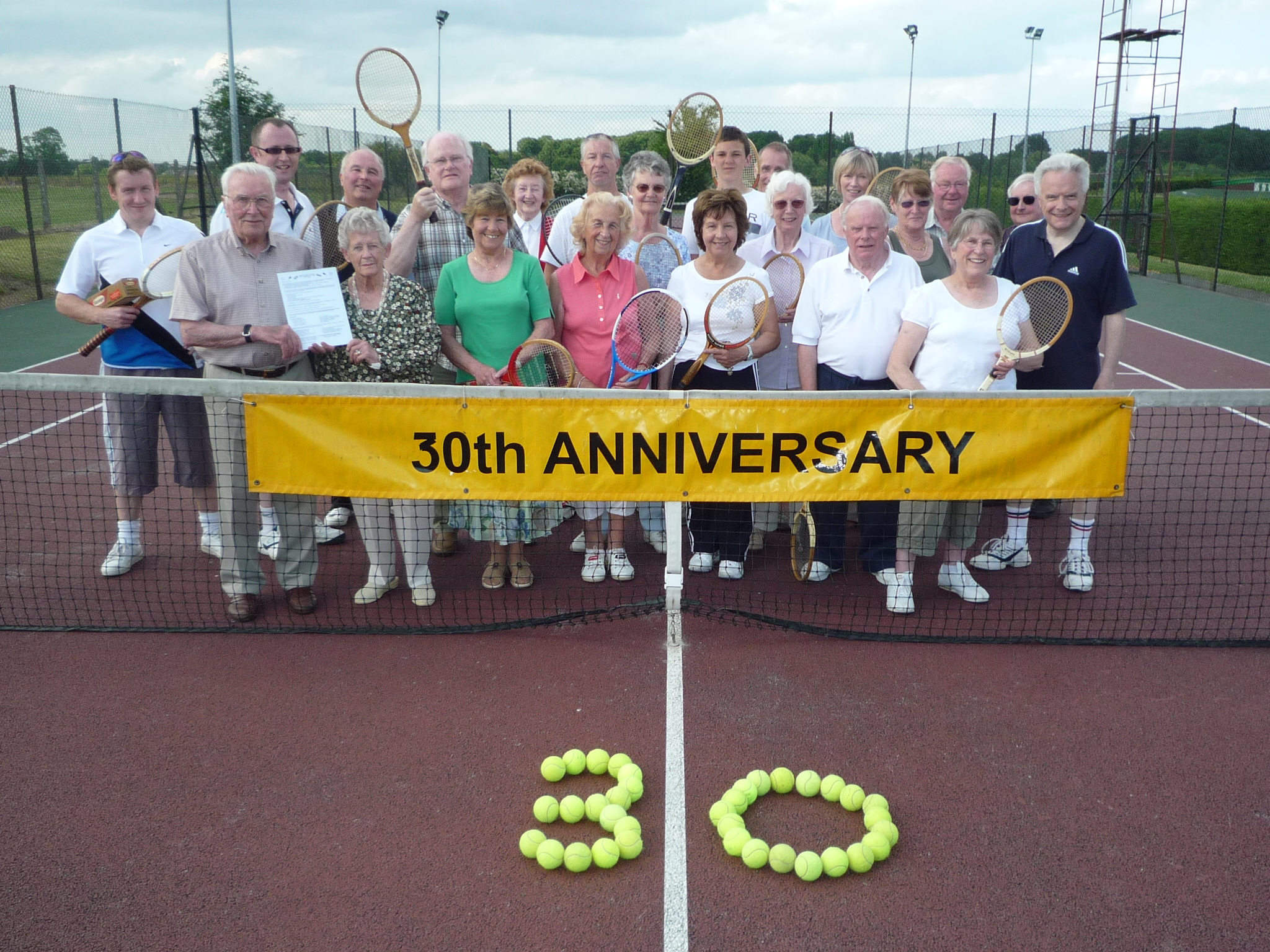
Wistaston Jubilee Tennis Club's 30th anniversary celebration

There are a variety of sports teams in Wistaston, including: archery, badminton, cricket, football, tennis and bowls.

Wistaston Sports and Leisure Association run the Eric Swan Sports Ground and Brittles Pavilion; the ground is located off Church Lane behind the primary school. The association was set up in 1997; it is an independent 'not for profit' organisation set up to encourage sport and leisure activities in Wistaston.

== See also ==
- Listed buildings in Wistaston
