= Tilstone Lodge =

Country house in Tilstone Fearnall, Cheshire, England

Coordinates: 53.14483°N 2.64609°W

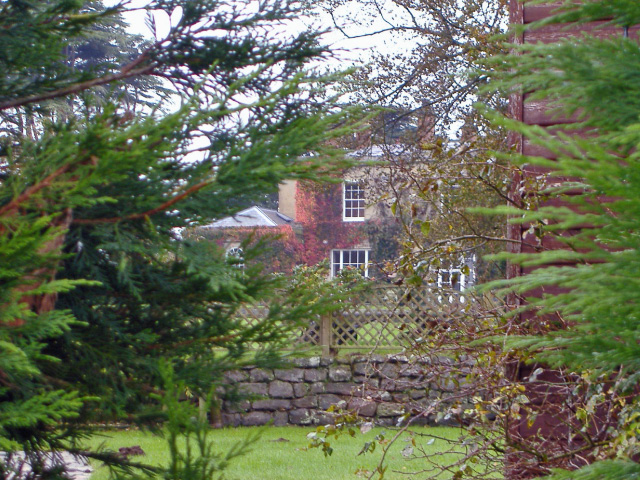
Tilstone Lodge

Tilstone Lodge is a country house in the parish of Tiverton and Tilstone Fearnall, Cheshire, England. It was built between 1821 and 1825 for Admiral John Richard Delap Halliday, who later changed his surname to Tollemache. The architect was Thomas Harrison of Chester. The house is described by Figueirdo and Treuherz as being "pleasantly spacious but not grand". It is constructed in stuccoed brick with ashlar dressings, and it has a slate roof. The house is in two storeys with sash windows, and has a porte-cochère with two pairs of unfluted Doric columns. An orangery was added to the southeast corner later in the 19th century. The house is recorded in the National Heritage List for England as a designated Grade II listed building.

== See also ==
- Listed buildings in Tilstone Fearnall
- List of works by Thomas Harrison
