= George Latham (architect) =

English architect and surveyor

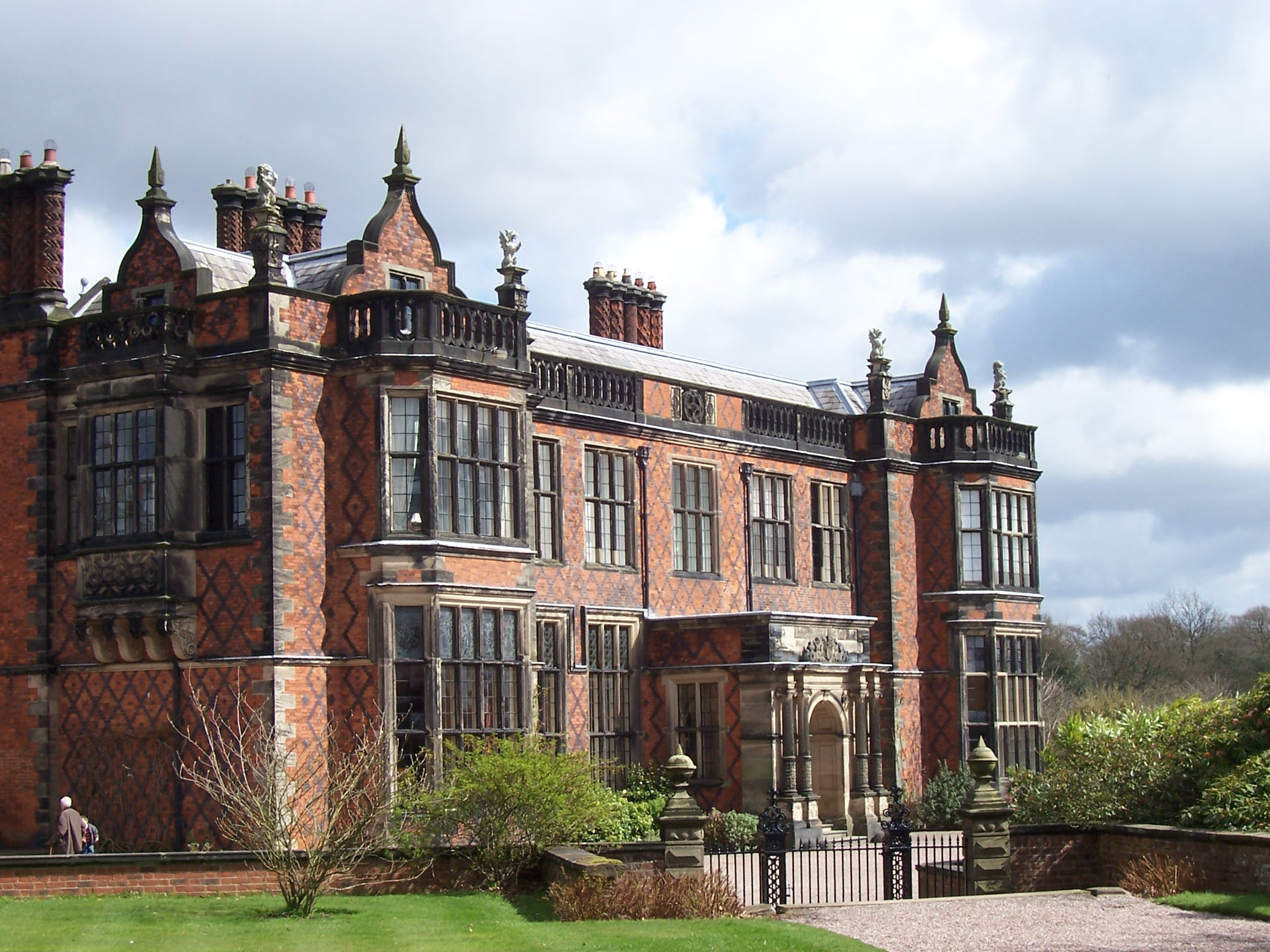
Arley Hall

George Latham (baptised 25 September 1793 – 8 August 1871) was an English architect and surveyor, who practised from an office in Nantwich, Cheshire. He designed two country houses, Arley Hall and Willington Hall, as well as churches, Northwich Union Workhouse, and various buildings in Nantwich.

== Personal life ==
George Latham was baptised on 25 September 1793. His father John worked making saddles.

Latham married Mary Gee, the daughter of the Wesleyan Methodist minister of Nantwich, the Reverend Thomas Gee, on 7 July 1829. They had five children including at least three sons; the second, Baldwin Latham (1836–1917) became a civil engineer and meteorologist; the youngest, Edwin Davenport Latham, also became a civil engineer. In 1850, Latham was living on Hospital Street in Nantwich. He died on 8 August 1871.

== Works ==
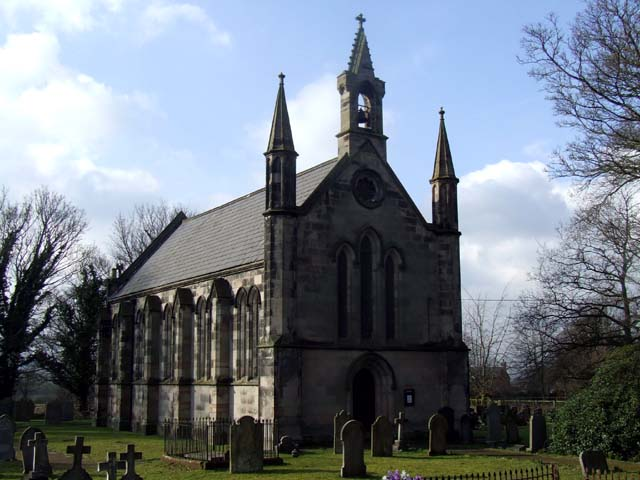
St Jude's Church, Tilstone Fearnall

His works include the country houses, Arley Hall and Willington Hall, parish churches in Wistaston and Tilstone Fearnall, Northwich Union Workhouse, and various buildings in Nantwich including the Congregational Chapel, Savings Bank, market hall and town hall (now demolished). Hartwell et al. in the Buildings of England series consider Arley Hall to be his finest work. He designed buildings in a variety of architectural styles, including Neoclassical, Jacobean, and Georgian.

=== Unsuccessful projects ===
Latham was approached by John Tollemache, 1st Baron Tollemache, with the prospect of becoming the architect for Peckforton Castle, but was not appointed to the position and received £2,000 in compensation. The architect ultimately appointed was Anthony Salvin. Latham was also commissioned by Hungerford Crewe, 3rd Baron Crewe, to carry out alterations to Crewe Hall in 1836, but was replaced by Edward Blore.

== See also ==
- List of works by George Latham
