= Donald Gilbert =

British artist (1900–1961)

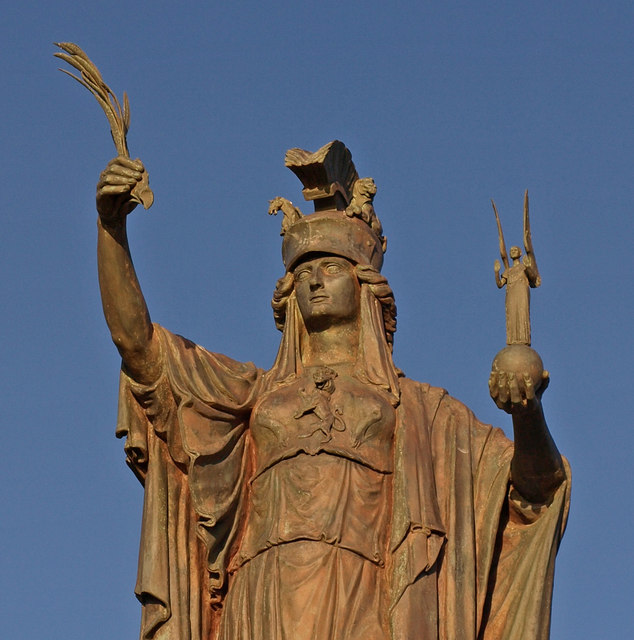
- Troon War Memorial
- Born: Hubert Donald Macgeoch Gilbert; 1900; Burcot, Worcestershire
- Died: 1961 (aged 60–61)
- Education: Birmingham Central School of Art, the Royal College of Art and the Royal Academy and in Rome and Florence
- Known for: Sculpture
- Awards: Royal Academy silver and bronze medals

Donald Gilbert (1900–1961), named Hubert Donald Macgeoch Gilbert at birth, was an English sculptor and modeller. He studied at prestigious art schools in England, Rome and Florence before beginning his career. He did works under his own name, such as commissions for the Adelphi building in London. He also collaborated with his father, Walter Gilbert, a sculptor at H.H. Martyn & Co.

== Personal life and studies ==
Gilbert was born in Burcot, Worcestershire in 1900 and as a child studied at Rugby School.

Aside from studies in Florence and Rome, Gilbert studied at the Birmingham Central School of Art, the Royal College of Art and the Royal Academy, where he was a silver and bronze medalist. In 1927 he was highly commended in the British Prix de Rome final competition.

Gilbert, who worked under his full name, became a member of Royal Birmingham Society of Artists in 1937. He exhibited at Chenil Galleries, Glasgow Institute of the Fine Arts, Royal Society of Artists Birmingham, Royal Academy, Royal Hibernian Academy, Royal Scottish Academy and Walker Gallery in Liverpool.

== Works ==
Gilbert's works include decorative and animal sculpture, portrait busts, pottery and sculptural works that he collaborated on with his father at H.H. Marten. He designed pottery for Ashtead Potters and Bourne Denby Pottery. One of his most notable works was a carving for London's Adelphi Building.

| Work | Image | Location | Notes and References |
|---|---|---|---|
| Adelphi Building | | 1-11 John Adam Street, London | Donald Gilbert's sculpture 'Night' (aka Night Thrusting Day Aside). |
| Edward Elgar | | Guildhall, Worcester | |
| John Logie Baird | | National Portrait Gallery, London | The bronze bust was made in 1943 |
| Sir Henry Wood | | Queen's Hall, Langham Place, London | The bust of Wood was unveiled in 1938 by Sir Walford Davies as part of the celebration of Wood's fifty years as a conductor. It is one of a few pieces of art that survived the hall's destruction during World War II. |
| Sir Henry Wood | | Royal Albert Hall, London | A bronze bust of Wood, belonging to the Royal Academy of Music, is placed in front of the Organ for the entire BBC Proms season. |
| Memorial to Walter Gilbert and Louis Weingartner | | Hanbury Church, Hanbury, Worcestershire | |
| Stocks-Masseys at Towneley Hall | | Burnley, Lancashire | |
| Walter Gilbert | | Hartlebury, Worcestershire | Gilbert's bust of his father resides at the Hartlebury Museum. |
| Winifred Spooner | | | A bronze bust of pilot Winifred Spooner unveiled on 30 May 1934 by Lindsay Everard MP at the headquarters of the Women’s Automobile and Sports Association, presented by an anonymous donor. |
| Bust of a man, head and shoulders | | Aberdeen, Scotland | Bust of a man, head and shoulders, Bronze, Signed and Dated 1960, 53 cm - 33 cm (20.87 in - 12.99 in) Sold 2017 |
| John Logie Baird | | West Clyde Street, Helensburgh, Argyll and Bute | A bust of John Logie Baird mounted on a concrete plinth, depicted in middle age, wearing a suit. A version of the 1943 original is now in the National Museum of Scotland. |

== Works with Walter Gilbert ==
It was in around 1922 that Gilbert worked as a modeller and worked with his father, Walter Gilbert.

== See also ==
- Walter Gilbert
