= List of works by Walter Gilbert =

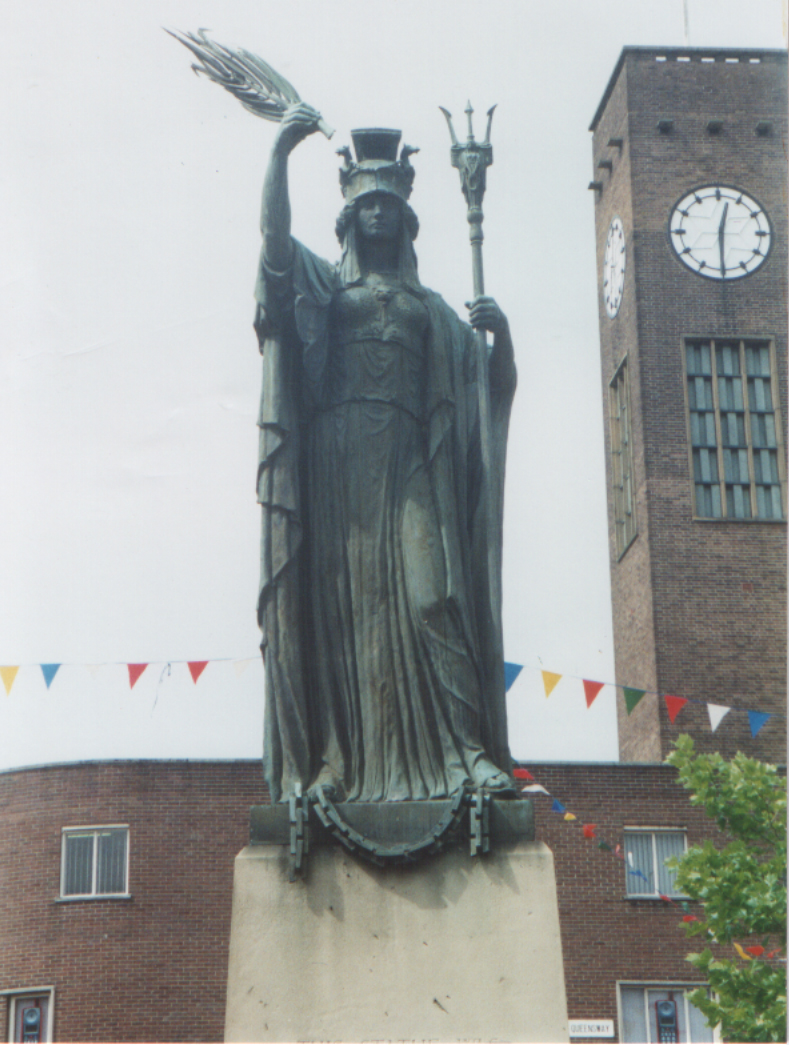
Crewe war memorial, Crewe, Cheshire.

This List of works by Walter Gilbert includes the works of Walter Gilbert alone and those done in collaboration with other individuals such as Louis Weingartner, both with the Bromsgrove Guild and H.H. Martyn & Co. of Cheltenham. He also worked with his son, Donald Gilbert, and H. H. Martyn.

== Early works ==
| Work | Image | Location | Notes and References |
|---|---|---|---|
| Pair of Fire Dogs | | Whereabouts unknown | This wrought iron work was exhibited at Leeds City Art Gallery's Spring Exhibition of 1902. |
| Bronze Door Knocker | | Whereabouts unknown | This door knocker in bronze was exhibited at the Leeds City Art Gallery's Spring Exhibition in 1906. |
| Unitarian Memorial Church | | Wallasey, Merseyside | Gilbert designed and made some hanging lamps for this church in Liscard near Wallasey in 1899. |
| Corona Light Fittings | | Vienna, Austria | Gilbert designed some light fittings for the Paris Exhibition of 1900. These are now in the Osterreichisches Museum für Angewandte Kunst in Vienne. |

== With Louis Weingartner and the Bromsgrove Guild ==
| Work | Image | Location | Notes and References |
|---|---|---|---|
| Buckingham Palace gates | | Buckingham Palace, London | From 1905 to 1911, The Bromsgrove Guild and Walter Gilbert were commissioned to design and manufacture a Royal Coat of Arms for the Buckingham Palace Gates and embellishments for The Great Gates of Canada and the Australian Screens all opposite the Victoria Memorial, as well as lamps for the Palace gates. |
| Moreton Hall, Warwickshire | | Moreton Morrell, Warwickshire | A centaur handrail made for this house was destroyed by fire in 1908. |
| Trowel, Level and Mallet | | Whereabouts unknown | In 1907 Gilbert designed and had manufactured a trowel, level and mallet to be used for the ceremony of laying the foundation stone for the Edward VII Galleries at the British Museum. |
| British Museum | | London | The lift enclosure for the British Museum Extension (Edward VII Galleries) dates from around 1907. The enclosure features the Royal Coats of Arms. This work was arranged by Walter Gilbert in association with The Bromsgrove Guild. |
| Lyons's Restaurant at the Franco-British Exhibition at Shepherd's Bush. London | | Whereabouts unknown, thought destroyed. | Plaster enrichment for a Lyon's Restaurant. |
| RMS Lusitania | | Vessel sunk 7 May 1915 | In 1908 Gilbert designed and had manufactured two reliefs as interior fittings for the Cunard liner, RMS Lusitania. One was entitled "The music of the sea and of the winds" and the other "Amorini upsetting the emblems of time". |
| "The Vines Public House" | | Lime Street, Liverpool | Gilbert carried out plasterwork for the smoke-room of this public house in 1908. The theme was "Harvest". |
| Warwickshire College of Agriculture | | Moreton Morrell, Staffordshire | Walter worked on a fountain for Moreton Hall, now the Warwickshire College of Agriculture. |
| Battle of Jutland Medal | | Greenwich, Outer London | For the British Museum, Gilbert worked on the 1916 bronze Battle of Jutland Medal. This is held in the collection of the National Maritime Museum in Greenwich. The medal, which featured busts of Admirals John Jellicoe and David Beatty, was produced in response to a competition conceived by Sir Arthur Evans for a medal to commemorate the Battle of Jutland of 1916. Gilbert designed the obverse around the busts of Admirals Jellicoe and Beatty and the reverse is by Charles Wheeler. Gilbert's medal came third. The Royal Numismatic Society arranged for the three winning models to be struck in bronze. |
| Welbeck Abbey | | Welbeck, Nottinghamshire | In around 1926 and working with Weingartner, Gilbert executed two wall plaques for the chapel of Welbeck Abbey near Worksop. One was entitled "Grieving Mother" and the second "Mourning Knight". |

== With Donald Gilbert and Martyns of Cheltenham ==
| Work | Image | Location | Notes and References |
|---|---|---|---|
| Derry and Toms | | High Street, Kensington, London | A total of 38 grilles, of varying sizes, were made for what was originally the Derry and Toms department store, built 1929–31. Walter Gilbert designed several works which were then modelled by Donald Gilbert. Casting by H. H. Martyn of Cheltenham. |
| Unilever House | | New Bridge Street, London | Gilbert executed some side gates and lamp pillars in 1931 to 1932. The work was modelled by Walter Gilbert in association with Donald Gilbert and cast in the foundry of H. H. Martyn of Cheltenham. |
| London Chamber of Commerce | | Cannon Street, London | Gilbert executed the panels on either side of the entrance to the Chamber of Commerce in 1934. There was also some interior work carried out but this is no longer extant. The left panel depicts a sickle with wheat-sheaf, a Coat of Arms and two cogs. The right panel has a hand holding a telephone, ledgers, a sealed scroll, another coat of arms and bales. |
| British General Insurance Co.building | | Cheapside, London | The work done on this building no longer exists. |
| RMS Queen Mary | | Now at Long Beach in California | Gilbert was commissioned to make a work in bronze for the RMS Queen Mary which is now at Long Beach, California. He created the door to the private dining room, two hinged doors for the first class restaurant (each with the decorated handles on the restaurant side), and a set of two sliding doors, with four depictions of "The Elements". |
| Anglo-American Corporation Building | | Johannesburg, South Africa | Gilbert designed and had made the bronze doors of the head office of the Anglo-American Corporation of South Africa, 44 Main Street, Johannesburg, South Africa in 1938. The reliefs on the door depict scenes relating to commerce, agriculture and fruit-farming, all industries of South Africa. Walter Gilbert was responsible for the design, the modelling was by his son Donald Gilbert and the metalwork executed by H. H. Martyn's of Cheltenham. |
| St Andrew's House | | Calton Hill, Edinburgh, Lothian | St. Andrew's House, South of Regent Road, Edinburgh was in 1938 the principal department of the Scottish Office and Gilbert designed the bronze doors to the building, the modelling being carried out by his son Donald Gilbert. Bronze casting of the door was by H. H. Martyn of Cheltenham. |
| Kingston Guildhall | | Kingston upon Thames, Surrey | In 1935 Gilbert sculpted some reliefs for the Kingston Guildhall. |
| Ralph Slazenger Trust | | Albemarle Street London | Doors, screen and showcases were made for The Ralph Slazenger Trust building, London in about 1936. The works were designed by Walter Gilbert, modelled by Donald Gilbert, and made by the foundry H. H. Martyn of Cheltenham. |
| Neptune Fountain | | Kansas City, United States of America | The fountain is located on 47th Street at The Plaza, Kansas City, Missouri. |
| Selfridges Store | | Oxford Street, London | Lamp-stands at the entrance to Selfridges, Oxford Street, London were made in 1928. The modelling was by Walter Gilbert and the metal casting by H. H. Martyn of Cheltenham. |
| University Of Glasgow Chapel | | Glasgow, Scotland | The figures carved on the pulpit in the memorial chapel represent four Scottish saints: St Margaret, St Columba, St Bride and St Oran. The symbols associated with these saints also appear: book, dove, lamp and the Celtic cell. There is a figure on the newel-post of the pulpit stair representing the Sower who sows "the seed of the Word". Photograph of newel post shown courtesy Sam Maddra. |
| George VI and Queen Elizabeth Coronation Medallion | | | In 1937 Gilbert worked on this commemorative medal. The obverse of the medallion was designed by Donald Gilbert and the reverse by Walter Gilbert, monogrammed respectively. |
| Pan and the Nymphs Fountain | | Kansas City | This work was originally at Moreton Paddox, Kineton, Warwickshire, England. Next moved to East 47th Street, Kansas City, Missouri. It is 14 ft. long, 13 ft. high, 9 ft. 9 ins. wide. This 10,000-pound lead sculpture was purchased by the Nichols Company in 1960 and found its current home in 1969 in the centre of Chandler Court. |
| Cornhill | | Cornhill, London | Gilbert designed a pair of carved mahogany doors for Cornhill Insurance Group's London Headquarters at the time. Cornhill is a thriving commercial thoroughfare in the financial centre of London. The reliefs were modelled in clay and the carvings were then carried out by B.P Arnold at H. H. Martyn & Co Ltd of Cheltenham. |

== War memorials ==
=== With Louis Weingartner and Bromsgrove Guild ===
| Work | Image | Location | Notes and References |
|---|---|---|---|
| West Jesmond Presbyterians- WW1 Memorial | | West Jesmond, Tyne and Wear | This memorial in the Jesmond United Reformed Church in Newcastle, Northumberland, features various bronze figures. There is a soldier and a kneeling nurse, then a depiction of St George, then Christ on the cross with two angels kneeling at his feet, then St Michael and finally a sailor and a seated mother and child. There are twisted pilasters separating these figures and at the top of each column is an angel and at the bottom the head of a cherub. The inscription reads "NO MAN LIVETH UNTO HIMSELF / NO MAN DIETH UNTO HIMSELF / (NAMES) / 1914 – 1919" 25 names are listed. |
| Birmingham Conservative Club War Memorial | | Present whereabouts unknown | Before 1926, Gilbert executed a war memorial for this club which was located at the Winston Churchill House in Birmingham. |
| Metropolitan-Vickers Electrical | | Unknown | Two lanterns were designed and made for this building. |
| Liverpool Anglican Cathedral | | Liverpool, Merseyside | The sandstone memorial to the 55th (West Lancashire) Division, is located above the arch which supports the west gallery in the south arm of the eastern transept. A winged Angel holding a cross holds a crown over a kneeling soldier and a carved scroll is flanked by two carved roses. The whole sculptured group is positioned under a canopy which rests on a slightly projecting corbel table, the corbels representing the tracks of tanks. The memorial is flanked by a Union Flag and the flag of the Division. Weingartner and Gilbert designed the memorial and the sculptural work was done by W. Meadows. The ashes of Lieutenant-General Sir Hugh Jeudwine who commanded the division from its formation in 1916 until the end of the war rest at the back of the memorial. The inscription reads "THEY WIN OR DIE / WHO WEAR THE ROSE OF LANCASTER / FIFTY FIFTH DIVISION" |
| Tamworth General Hospital. War Memorial Tablet. | | Tamworth, Staffordshire | The war memorial tablet was inscribed "THEY WHOM THIS HALL / COMMEMORATES WERE / NUMBERED AMONG THOSE / WHO AT THE CALL OF KING / AND COUNTRY LEFT ALL THAT / WAS DEAR TO THEM, ENDURED / HARDNESS, FACED DANGER, & FINALLY PASSED OUT OF THE / SIGHT OF MEN BY THE / PATH OF DUTY AND SELF- / SACRIFICE, GIVING UP THEIR LIVES THAT OTHERS / MIGHT LIVE IN FREEDOM. / LET THOSE THAT COME AFTER SEE TO IT THAT THEIR NAME BE NOT FORGOTTEN" and the two plaques on either side read "THESE WALLS RECORD THE NAMES OF 608 MEN / OF TAMWORTH AND NEIGHBOURHOOD WHO / GAVE THEIR LIVES IN THE WAR OF 1914–1918 / NAMES UNDER EACH DISTRICT IN TAMWORTH" The Tamworth General Hospital was closed some time ago and the building converted to flats for the elderly. It is not known whether the memorial tablet is still intact. The bronze memorial tablet and plaques were positioned on the wall at the entrance to the out-patients hall and above the inscription was a relief depicting a cross and some laurel. An English rose was carved at each corner of the tablet. |
| Freemason's Hall | | Holborn, London | Gilbert is credited as being the architect of the shrine in this Freemasons' Hall. Work was also done on wall lamps, lamp stands and both interior and exterior doors to the grand temple of this hall. |

=== With Louis Weingartner and Martyns of Cheltenham ===
| Work | Image | Location | Notes and Reference |
|---|---|---|---|
| Mons Memorial to 5th Royal Irish Lancers | | Mons, Belgium | The memorial to the 5th Royal Irish Lancers in the Mons Town Hall dates to 1922. The Royal Irish Lancers were in Mons at the time of the retreat in 1914 and returned as liberators on Armistice Day. The panel shown in the photograph to the left shows the return, the Lancers being welcomed by Mons' mayor and curé. |
| Crewe War Memorial | | Crewe, Cheshire | The Crewe War Memorial stands in a square in Earle Street, Crewe, just by the library. It comprises a base surmounted by a pedestal upon which a figure of Britannia stands on some chains and holds a trident and palm. The inscription reads "THIS STATUE WAS/ PLACED TO COMMEMORATE/ THE MEN OF CREWE/ WHO SEEKING THE/ WELFARE OF THEIR/ COUNTRY GAVE THEIR/ LIVES IN SO DOING/ AND ARE NOW RESTING/ IN AND BEYOND/ THE SEAS/ LIFT UP YOUR HEARTS" The names of those 34 Crewe men remembered appear on plaques and tablets placed both on the memorial and on a raised wall built around the memorial. The unveiling by General Sir Ian Hamilton took place on 14 June 1924 |
| Troon War Memorial | | Troon, Strathclyde, Scotland | Another version of the figure of Britannia used at Crewe albeit with some slight alterations appears on Troon's war memorial which stands on Troon's south beach facing the sea. The names of those men of Troon lost in the 1914–1918 war are listed on three metal plaques on the faces of the plinth. A screen wall and plaques behind it lists those lost in the 1939–1945 conflict. There are two inscriptions. The first on the plinth itself reads "THIS STATUE/ WAS PLACED/ TO/ COMMEMORATE/ THE MEN OF/ TROON WHO/ SEEKING THE/ WELFARE OF/ THEIR COUNTRY/ GAVE THEIR LIVES/ IN SO DOING/ AND ARE NOW/ RESTING IN AND/ BEYOND THE SEAS/ LIFT UP YOUR HEARTS/ (NAMES)" and the second on the screen wall reads "1939 1945/ AT THE GOING DOWN OF THE SUN AND IN THE MORNING WE WILL REMEMBER THEM/ (NAMES)". |
| Morley War Memorial | | Morley, West Yorkshire | Another Britannia figure appears on the Morley War Memorial in Scatcherd Park, Morley. The inscription on the pedestal reads "REMEMBER/ THE MEN OF THIS/ BOROUGH OF MORLEY/ WHO SEEKING THE/ WELFARE OF THEIR/ COUNTRY LAID DOWN THEIR LIVES/ IN THE GREAT WAR AND/ ARE NOW RESTING BEYOND THE SEAS" and another on the wall by the plinth reads "AT THE GOING DOWN OF THE SUN AND IN THE MORNING WE WILL REMEMBER THEM 1939 – 1945/ (NAMES)". 453 men lost in the 1914–1918 ware are listed and 110 for the 1939–1945 war. |
| Burgh of Clydebank War Memorial | Photo by Lairich Rig. | Clydebank, Strathclyde, Scotland | At Clydebank is a memorial featuring a robed female figure symbolising peace, holding in her left hand a Greek lamp, from the centre of which issues "a little love which fills the heart of man". With her right hand she shelters love. The figure is gilded and set in a floodlit marble lined recess in the external wall of the Clydebank Town Hall. There is also a clock and carillon of bells in the municipal tower. Tablets with the names of those lost in the two World Wars are positioned on either side of the figure. The recess is flanked by pilasters and palm leaves are engraved above it. Gilbert carried out the sculptural work on this memorial. The names of those remembered are inscribed on the left and in the centre the words "THE/ GLORIOUS/ DEAD/ 1914 1918/ 1939 – 1945/ THIS SHRINE/ WITH THE/ CLOCK AND CHIMES/ DEDICATED TO THE MEMORY OF THE/ MEN OF CLYDEBANK/ WHO LAID DOWN THEIR LIVES IN THE/ GREAT WARS/ NON OMNIS MORIAR" appear and further names are listed on the figure's right side. |
| Women War Workers VAD Memorial | | Roxeth, Greater London | This memorial at Harrow Cottage Hospital commemorates the nurses and Voluntary Aid Detachment (VAD) staff who ministered to the wounded at the hospital in the First World War. It comprises a bronze plaque with a relief depicting a nurse on the left side. At the top of the tablet there is a scroll with the badges of St John Ambulance and the British Red Cross plus the letters VAD. The wording on the tablet reads "THIS TABLET COMMEMORATES THE/ SELF-DENIAL AND DEVOTION OF/ THE NURSES AND MEMBERS OF THE/ VOLUNTARY AID DETACHMENT/ WHO MINISTERED TO OUR/ WOUNDED IN THE BUTTS AND/ IN THIS HOSPITAL DURING THE/ GREAT WAR 1914–1919" |
| Eccleston Park War Memorial | | Eccleston, Merseyside | The Eccleston Park War Memorial stands in a small garden on the St Helens Road and has work by Gilbert and Weingartner. The memorial comprises a pedestal standing on a plinth and at the top of the pedestal is a bronze statue of a soldier who is raising field glasses to his eyes with his left hand and holds a revolver in his right hand. His foot rests on a German helmet. At the foot of the plinth a bronze statue of a young woman stands with her arms outstretched towards the soldier offering him a branch of laurel. On each side of the pedestal are four relief panels. One depicts a group of marching soldiers, another a group of airmen, another some soldiers with camels and in the fourth is a naval scene. The main inscription reads " TO THE GLORIOUS MEMORY/ OF ALL THOSE FROM THE/ WEST DERBY HUNDRED OF/ THE COUNTY PALATINE OF/ LANCASTER WHO FOUGHT/ AND GAVE THEIR LIVES FOR THEIR KING AND COUNTRY IN/ THE GREAT WAR 1914-1918/ THIS MEMORIAL IS ERECTED BY F R DIXON NUTTALL JP INGLEHOLME" and the words "THE LAURELS OF THE/ SONS ARE WATERED/ FROM THE HEARTS/ OF THE MOTHERS" appear on the relief panels. The Bishop of Liverpool, Francis Chavasse, carried out the unveiling on 23 July 1922. Gilbert and Weingartner carried out the sculptural work and the bronzes were cast by H.H.Martyn of Cheltenham. It appears that the memorial was commissioned by Dr. Frederick Dixon-Nuttall, whose son John had died in the war. The Dixon-Nuttall family had been involved in the glass-making industry for many years and were involved in the establishment of United Glass (UGB) in St Helens. |
| Liverpool News Exchange War Memorial | | Liverpool, Merseyside | Liverpool Newsroom War Memorial was designed by Gilbert and dates from 1992. It is located at Exchange Flags, Liverpool. This elaborate memorial is surmounted by Britannia in protective stance with an arm about a child, below which troops are poised vigilantly around a field gun. To the side, a nurse supports the head of a wounded soldier. |
| Liverpool Masonic War Memorial | | Liverpool, Merseyside | Liverpool Masonic War Memorial is located at 22 Hope Street in Liverpool. It was modelled by Walter Gilbert and cast by H. H. Martyn of Cheltenham. |
| Liverpool Anglican Cathedral | | Liverpool, Merseyside | The War Memorial Reredos in the North Transept Chapel of Liverpool Anglican Cathedral was modelled by Walter Gilbert. Machine-carving by H. H. Martyn of Cheltenham. |
| War Memorial Chapel, Liverpool Anglican Cathedral | | Liverpool, Merseyside | Gilbert worked on the cenotaph for the War Memorial Chapel in the Liverpool Anglican Cathedral. |
| Liverpool Anglican Cathedral | | Liverpool, Merseyside | Between 1919 and 1924 Gilbert completed the Great Reredos in Liverpool Anglican Cathedral. The complete reredos is 65 ft. high and 48 ft. wide. Work arranged and modelled by Walter Gilbert in association with Louis Weingartner. Machine-carved by H. H. Martyn of Cheltenham. |
| Liverpool Cathedral | | Liverpool, Merseyside | An altar rail was made for this cathedral. |
| Malvern College | | Malvern, Worcestershire | Gilbert executed some carvings for the college war memorial library. The architect involved was Sir Aston Webb and Son. Modelling by Walter Gilbert. Machine-carving by H. H. Martyn of Cheltenham. |
| Burnley War Memorial | | Burnley, Lancashire | A Gilbert and Weingartner co-operation. Work arranged and managed by Walter Gilbert. Bronze cast by H. H. Martyn of Cheltenham. |

=== With his son Donald Gilbert and H. H. Martyn ===
| Work | Image | Location | Notes and References |
|---|---|---|---|
| Sculpture on Doiran Memorial | | Doirani, Greece | The Doiran Memorial is in Greece, close to the border with the Republic of Macedonia. The site marks the scene of the fierce fighting of 1917–1918, which caused the majority of the Commonwealth battle casualties. The memorial was designed by Sir Robert Lorimer with sculpture by Walter Gilbert. It was unveiled by Sir George Macdonogh on 25 September 1926. |
| St Winifred's Church | | Holbeck, Nottinghamshire | Gilbert is described as the builder and Major George Baker-Carr as the designer of the pulpit in this church. |
| Birmingham Gas Department War Memorial | | Erdington, West Midlands | Gilbert and Weingartner worked together on this memorial. |

== Gallery ==
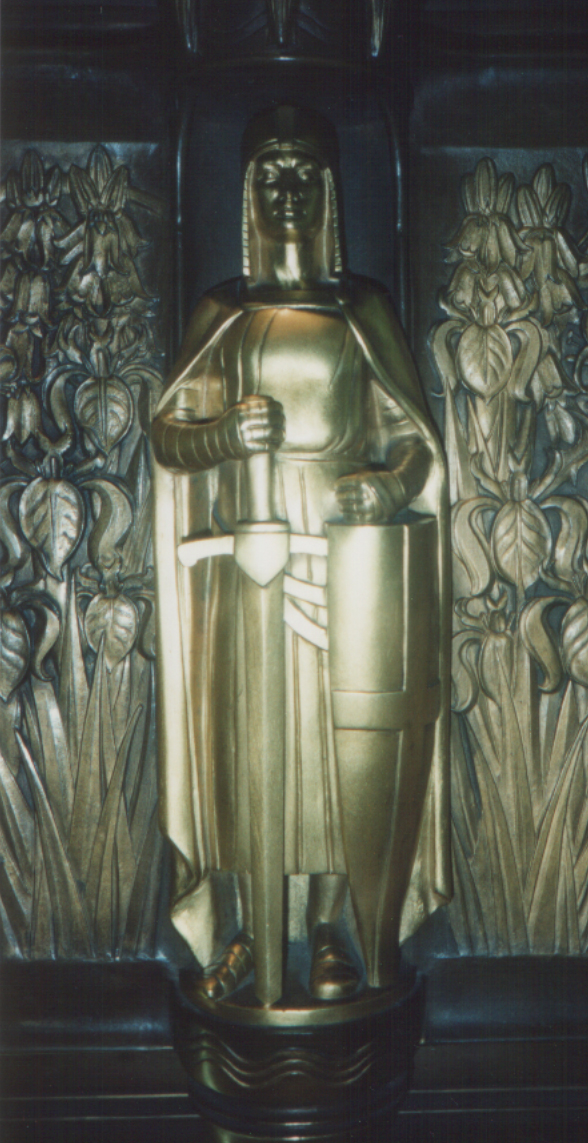
St George. One of four figures on the Freemasons Hall memorial, London.

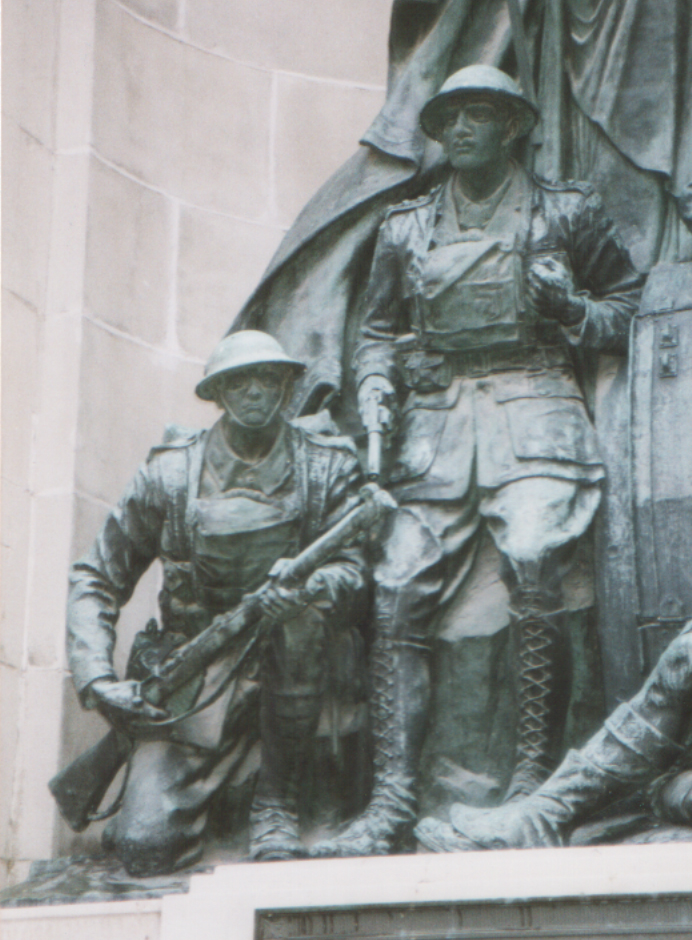
Liverpool News Exchange War Memorial.

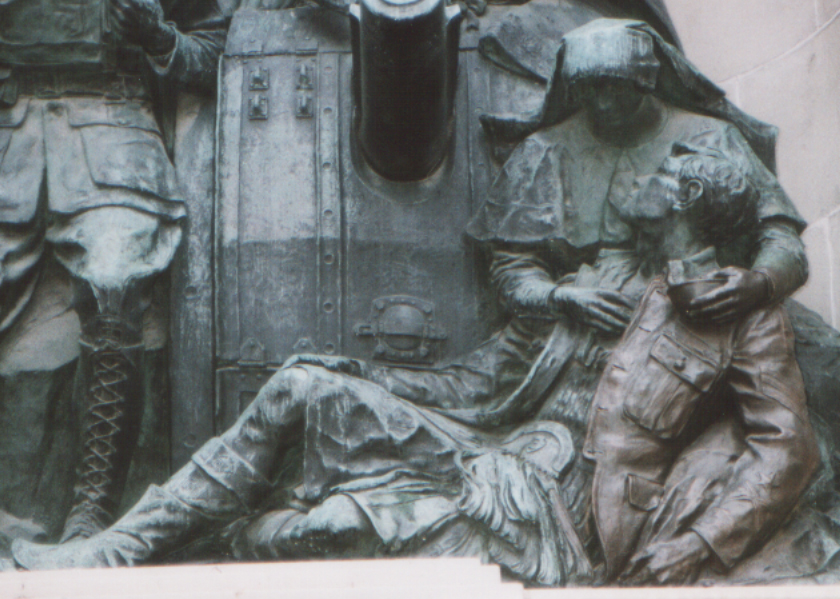
Liverpool News Exchange War Memorial.

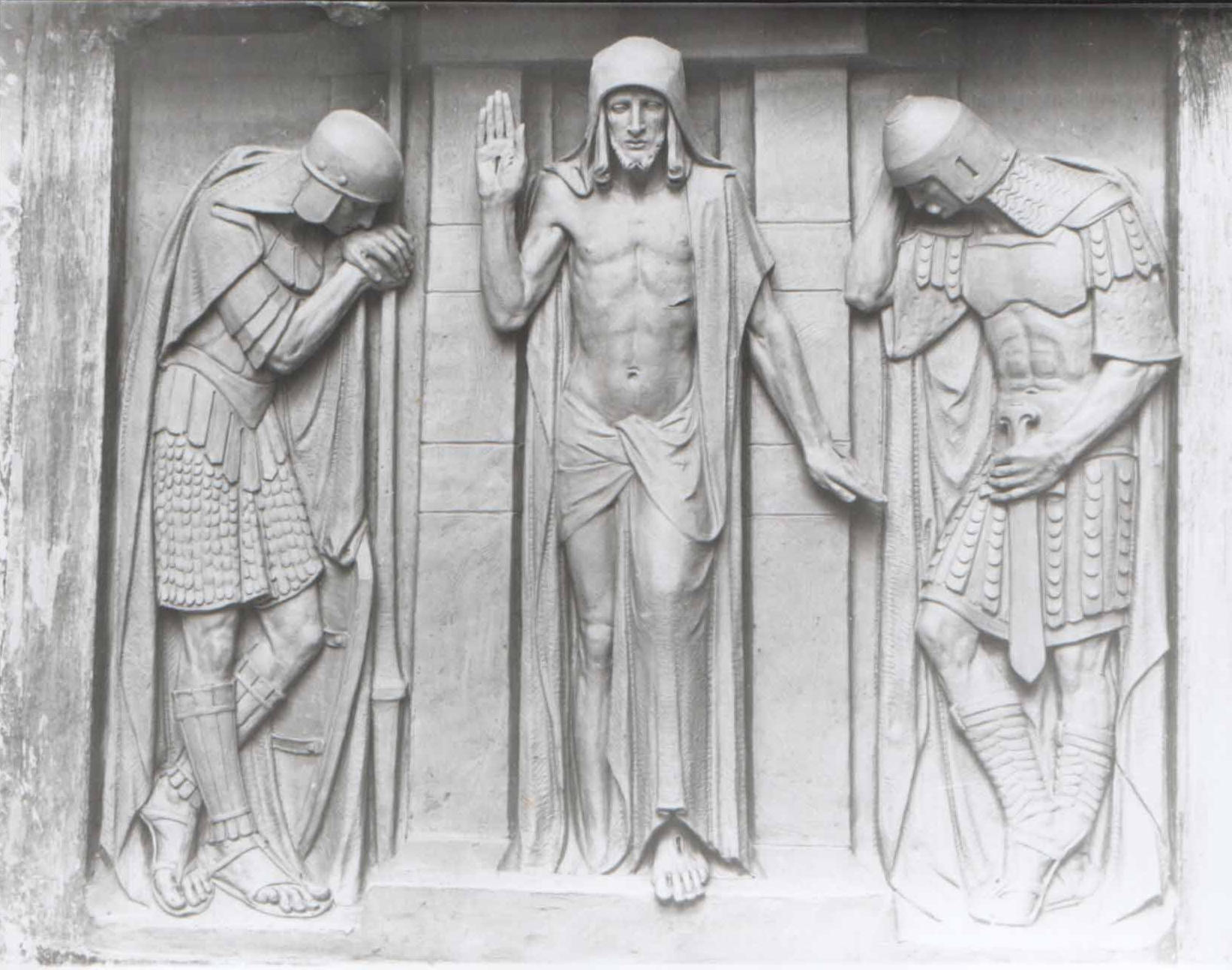
Reredos in Liverpool Anglian Cathedral.

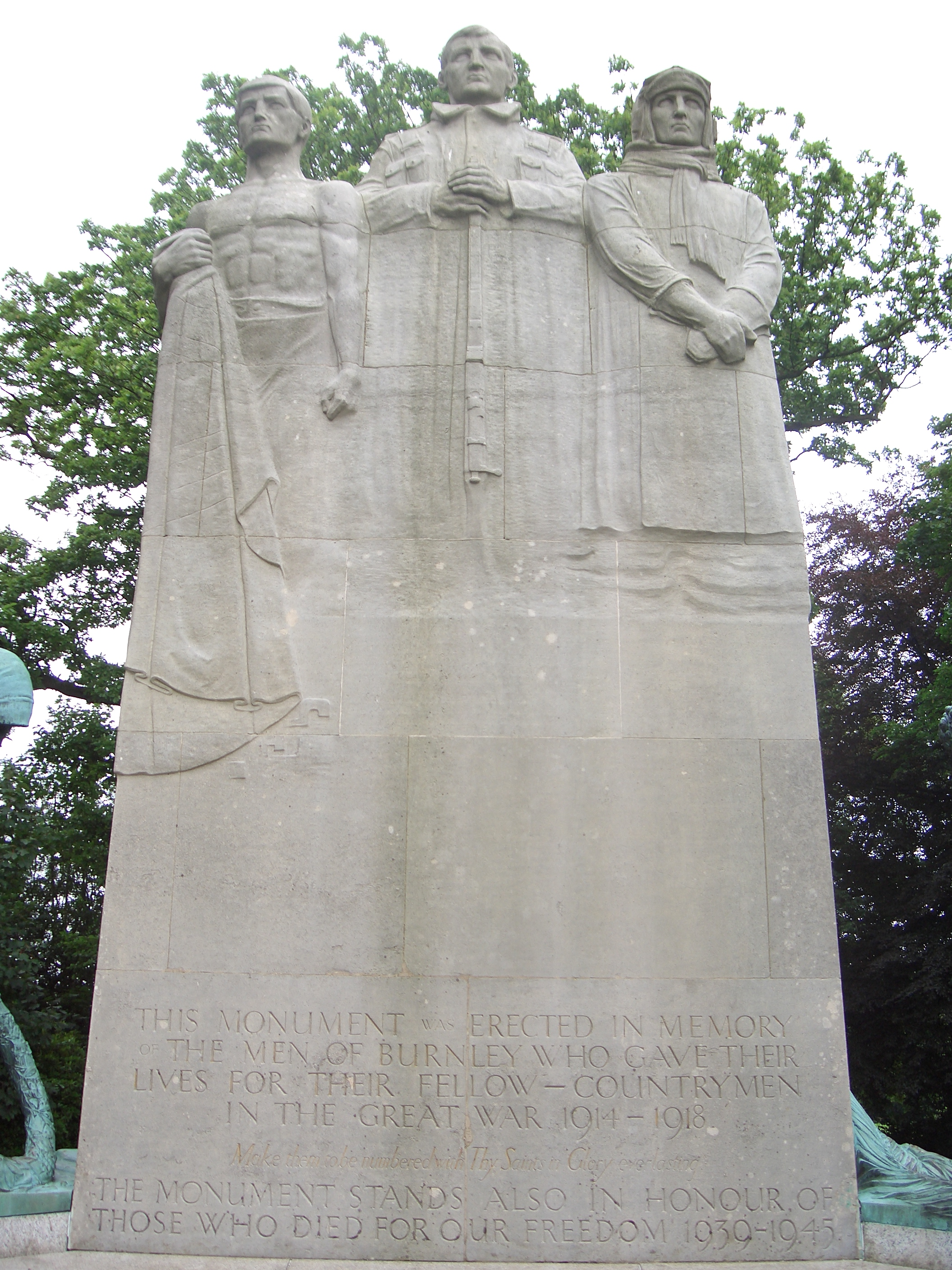
Burnley War Memorial.

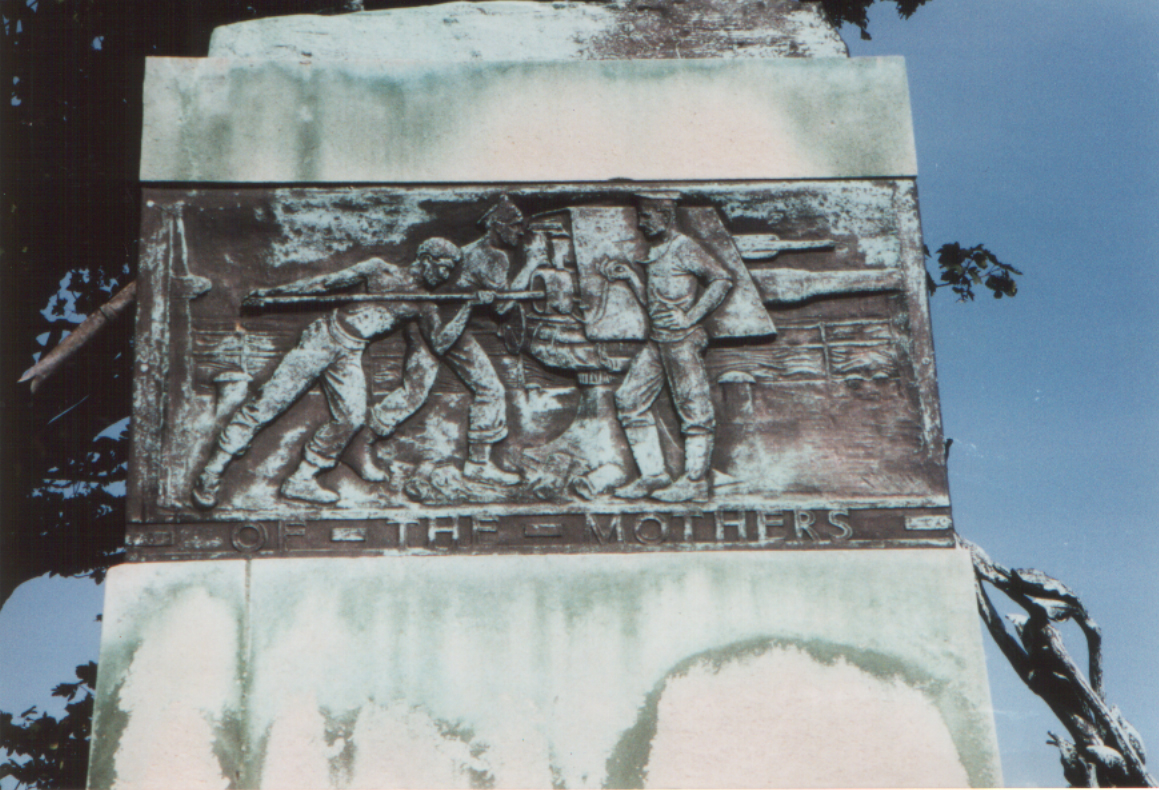
Relief on Eccleston Park War Memorial, Liverpool.

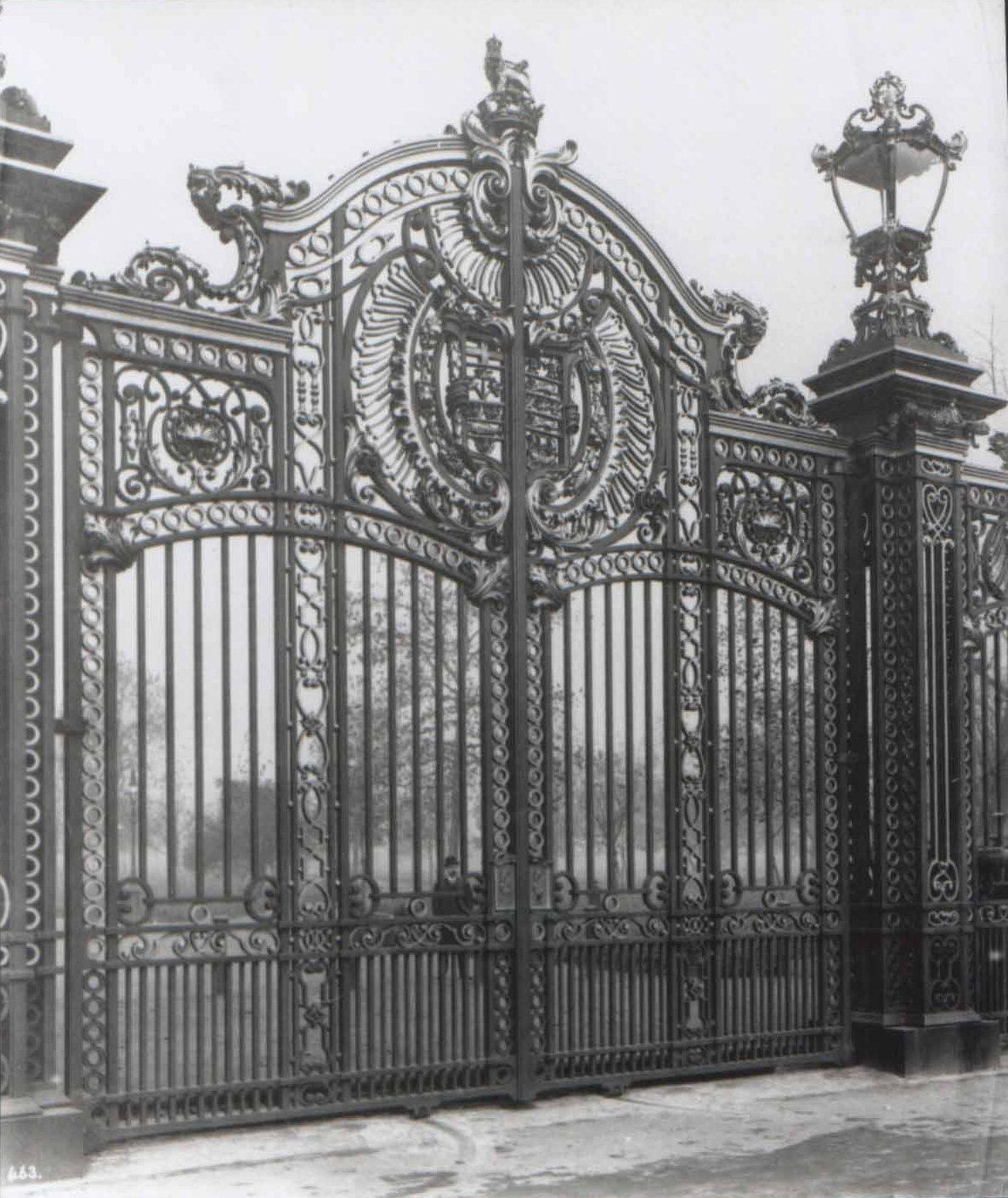
The Canadian Gates at Buckingham Palace, London.

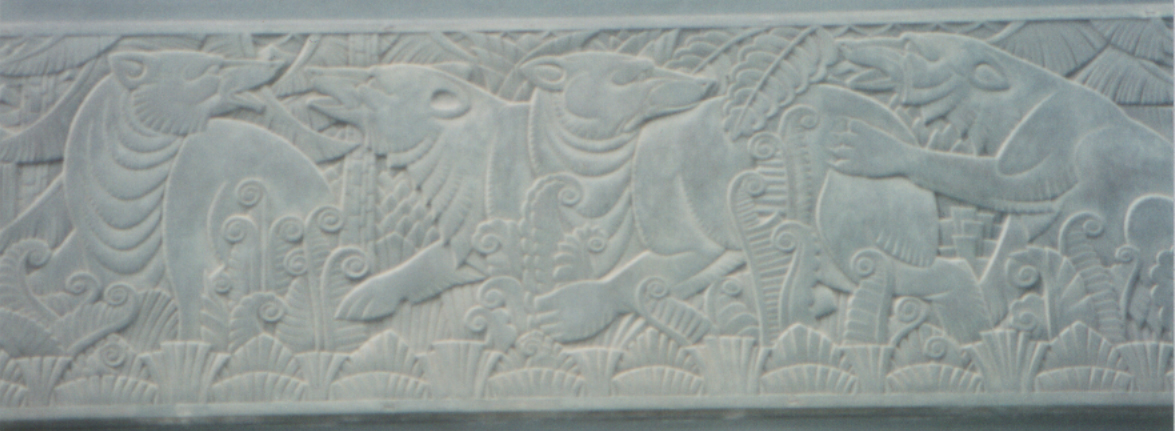
Derry and Toms, London.

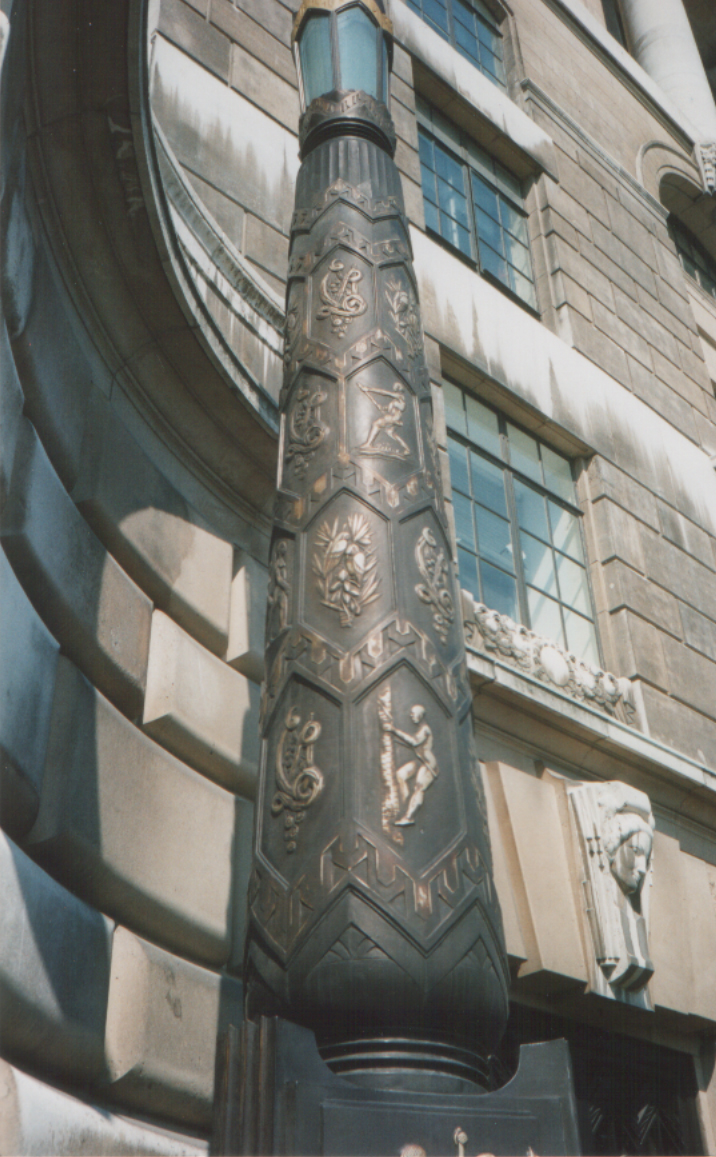
Unilever pillar, London.

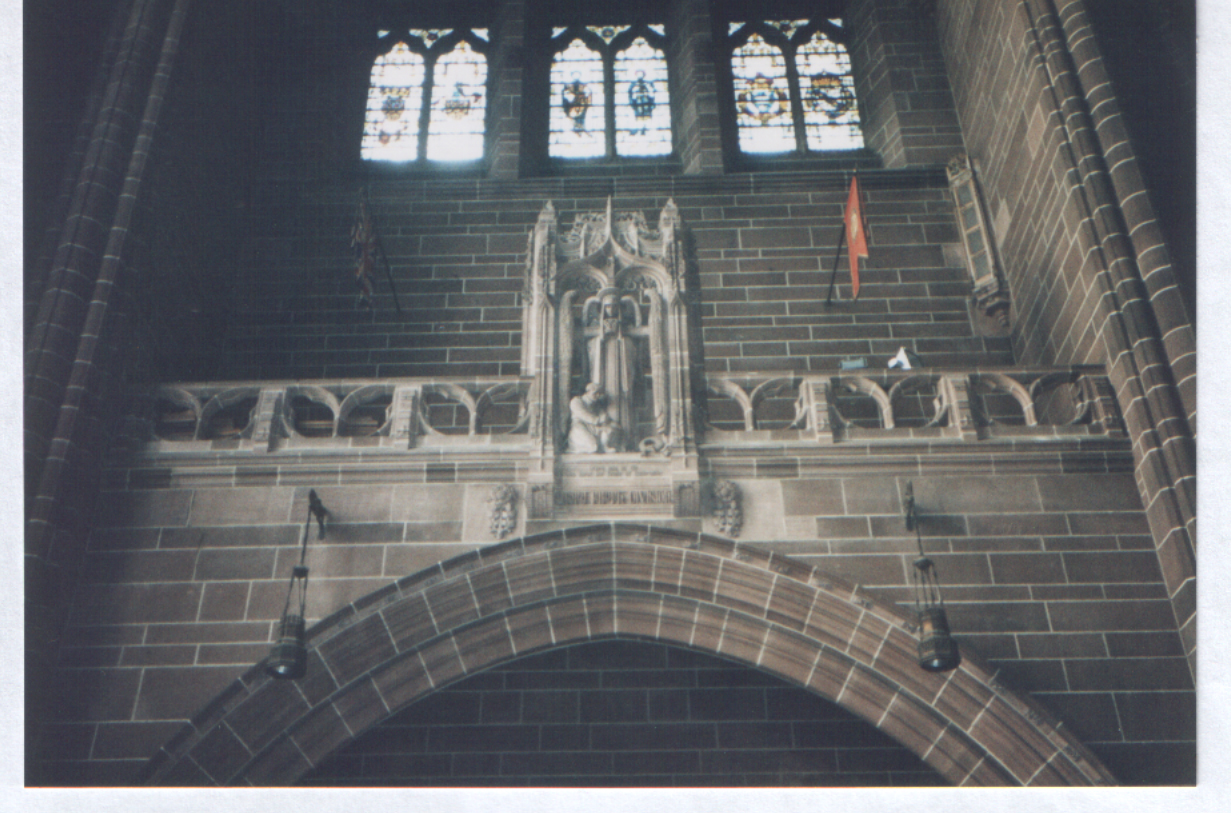
55th Division Memorial, Liverpool Anglican Cathedral.
