= Crewe War Memorial =

War memorial in Crewe, Cheshire, England

Coordinates: 53.09801°N 2.43955°W

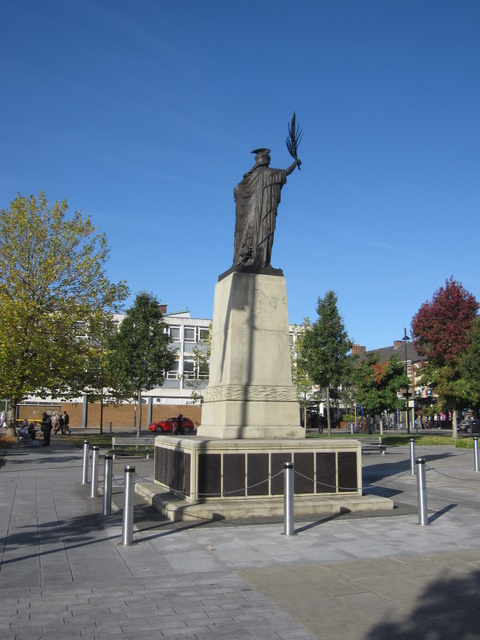
Crewe War Memorial

Crewe War Memorial stands in the Municipal Square, in Crewe, Cheshire, England. It consists of a bronze sculpture of Britannia standing on a pedestal, itself on a square base. The sculptor was Walter Gilbert and the sculpture was cast in the foundry of H. H. Martyn & Co. It was unveiled in 1924. The names of those killed in both world wars and in later conflicts are inscribed on bronze plaques around the base, and there are further inscriptions on the paving around the memorial. It originally stood in Market Square and was moved to Municipal Square (which was renamed as Memorial Square on 11 November 2014) in 2006. The memorial is recorded in the National Heritage List for England as a designated Grade II listed building.

== History ==
Following the First World War, the people of Crewe were slow to approve plans for the erection of a monument to the town's 700 soldiers who had fallen in the combat. The town already had a war memorial, the Boer War Memorial, which had been erected in Queen's Park in 1902–03. It was hoped that there could be a joint monument with the London and North Western Railway, the main employers and land owners in the town, but they already had their own monument at Euston station in London. Eventually the council's War Memorial Sub-Committee decided in 1922 to erect a monument in Market Square. This was to be financed by public subscription, and it was hoped that the railway company would contribute to the cost. Seven models were submitted for consideration, and the committee chose the one designed by Walter Gilbert depicting a figure of Britannia in bronze. Gilbert was the art director of the founders Martyns of Cheltenham, who were commissioned to cast the sculpture.

The foundations for the memorial were laid in September 1923. It was unveiled on 14 June 1924 by General Sir Ian Hamilton, and dedicated by the Bishop of Chester, Luke Paget. The total cost of the memorial was £1,600, of which £600 was given by the railway company. Following later wars and conflicts, plaques containing the names of those lost in the Second World War, the Falklands War, the Gulf War, and other conflicts were added. In 2004 Crewe and Nantwich Borough Council decided to make improvements to Market Square which would result in the memorial being moved. In November 2005 it was taken to the National Conservation Centre in Liverpool for restoration. The memorial was installed in Municipal Square in October 2006.

== Description ==
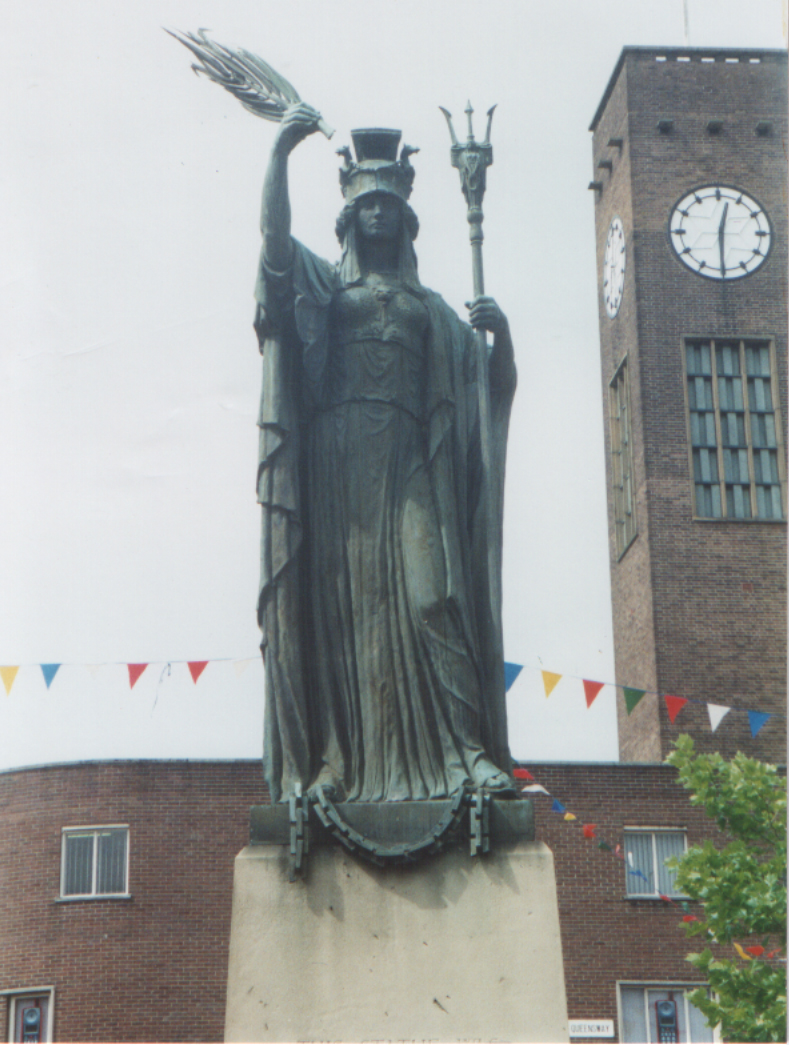
Britannia in its former location in Market Square

The figure of Britannia is in bronze, and it stands on a pedestal of Darley Dale limestone. This all stands on a large square base that was added in 2006. The figure is about 2.7 metres (8.9 ft) high, and the pedestal is about 3.3 metres (10.8 ft) in height. Britannia stands on chains, and holds a trident and a palm leaf. On the front of the pedestal is an inscription reading as follows.

THIS STATUE WAS
PLACED TO COMMEMORATE
THE MEN OF CREWE
WHO SEEKING THE
WELFARE OF THEIR
COUNTRY GAVE THEIR
LIVES IN SO DOING
AND ARE NOW RESTING
IN AND BEYOND
THE SEAS

On the reverse, the inscription reads:

LIFT UP YOUR HEARTS
1914 - 1918

The memorial is enclosed by paving inscribed with the following: (Note: This is known as the Kohima Epitaph.)

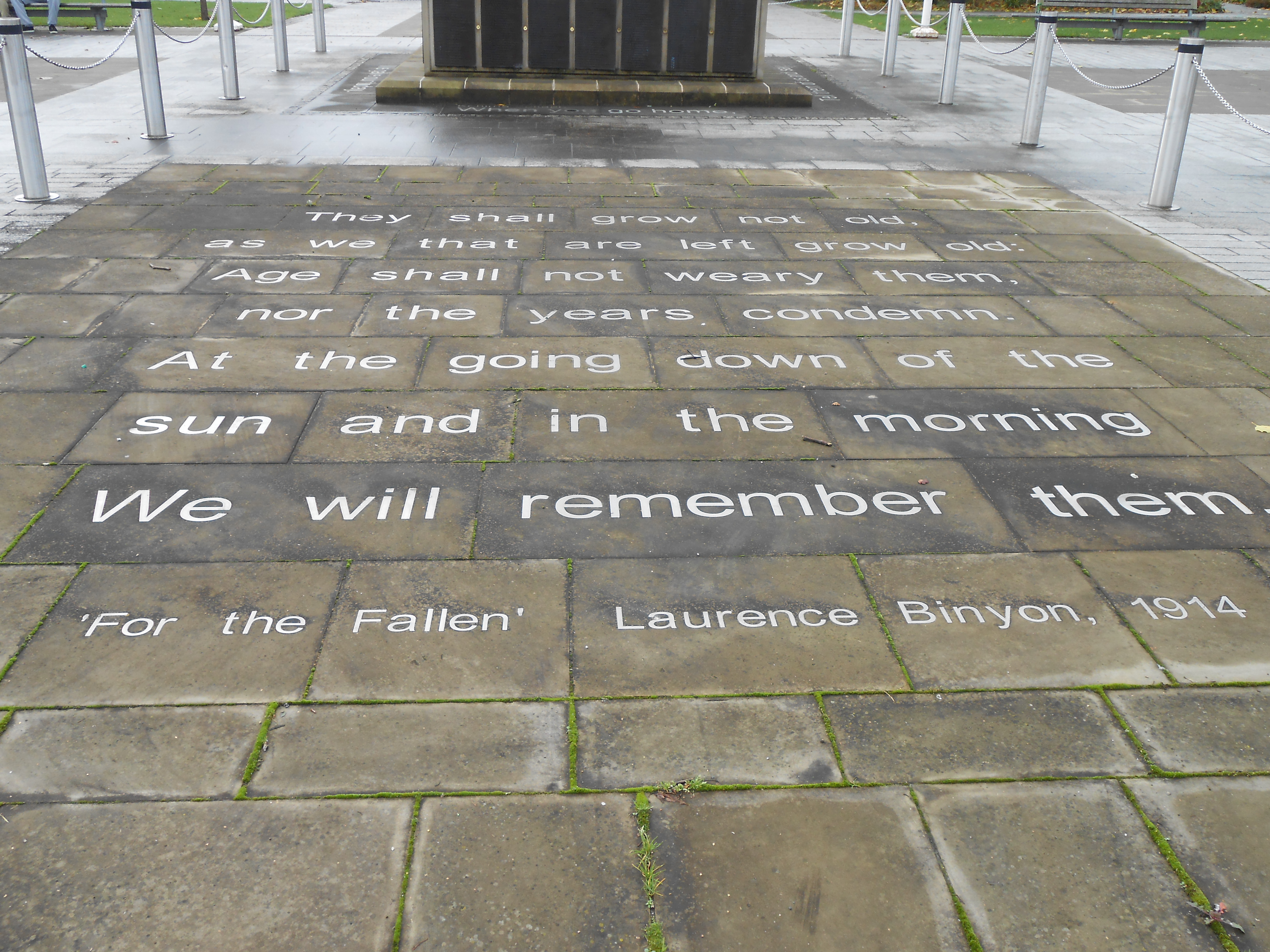
Inscriptions on the paving

WHEN YOU GO HOME TELL THEM OF US AND SAY FOR YOUR TOMORROW WE GAVE OUR TODAY

And the paving in front of the memorial is inscribed: (Note: This is taken from the poem For the Fallen by Laurence Binyon.)

THEY SHALL GROW NOT OLD AS WE THAT ARE LEFT GROW OLD
AGE SHALL NOT WEARY THEM NOR THE YEARS CONDEMN
AT THE GOING DOWN OF THE SUN AND IN THE MORNING
WE SHALL REMEMBER THEM

== Appraisal ==
The monument was designated as a Grade II listed building on 16 February 2005. Grade II is the lowest of the three grades of listing and is applied to "buildings of national importance and special interest". In the reasons for listing, the citation states that war memorials are generally listable because of their cultural and historical significance. The Crewe memorial is unusual because it is also includes the names of civilians killed in the Second World War, and the servicemen killed in the Falklands and Gulf Wars. The monument is well designed with a striking figure of Britannia, and it has a prominent position in Memorial Square (formerly Municipal Square). In addition it uses high quality materials and craftsmanship. In the Buildings of England series it is described as the "highlight of the square".

== See also ==
- Listed buildings in Crewe

== Notes and references ==
Notes

Citations
