= Walter Gilbert (sculptor) =

English sculptor

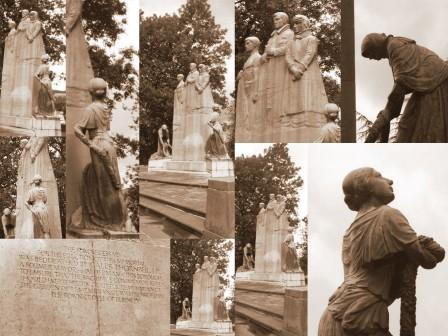
- A collage of the war memorial in the grounds of Towneley Hall, near Burnley, Lancashire
- Born: 12 August 1871; Rugby Warwickshire, England
- Died: 23 January 1946 (aged 74); Littlehampton, England
- Education: Birmingham Municipal School of Art, Royal College of Art

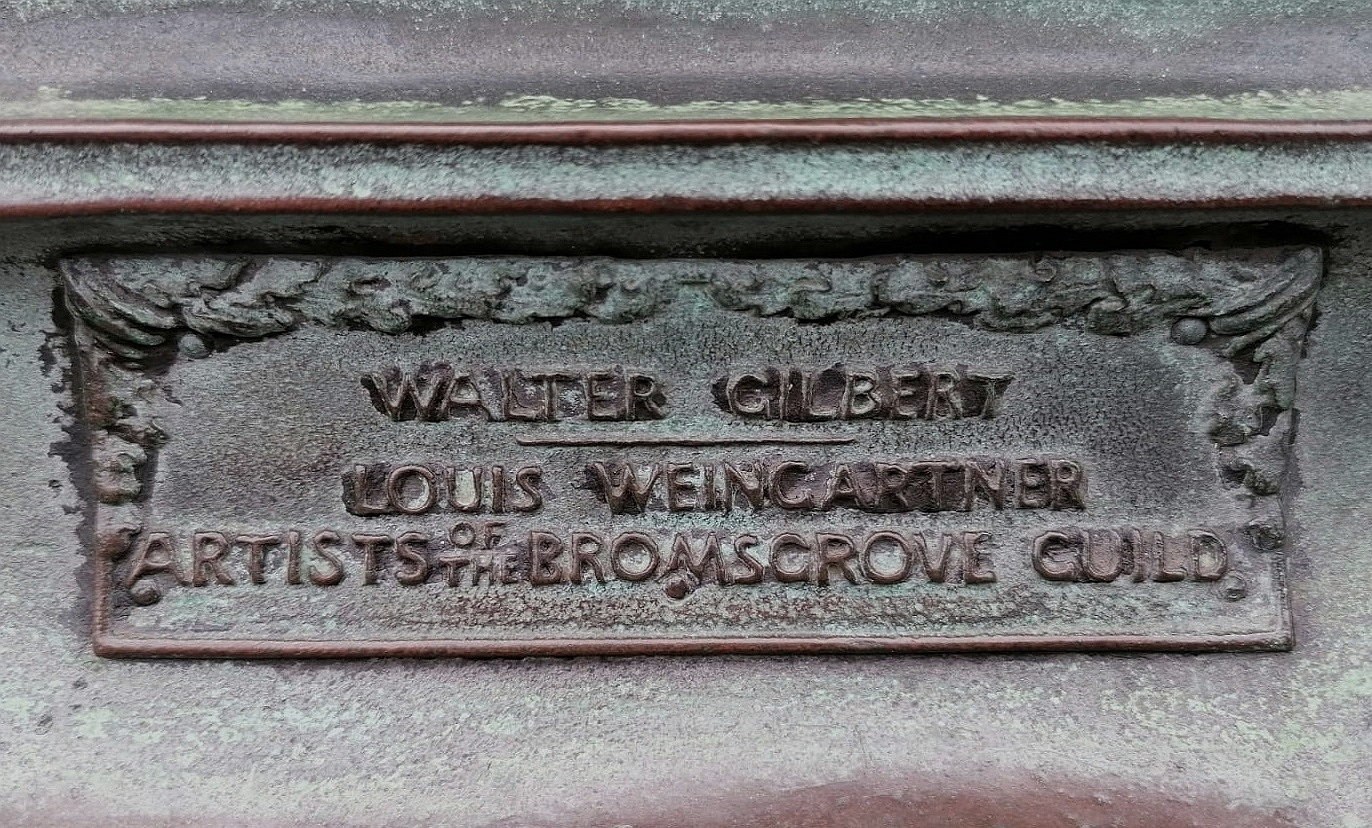
The names of Bromsgrove Guild craftsmen Walter Gilbert and Louis Weingartner on the main gate of Buckingham Palace

Walter Gilbert (1871–1946) was an English sculptor. He first studied at Birmingham Municipal School of Art and then the National Art Training School, now the Royal College of Art. After a short career as an instructor, Gilbert worked at the Bromsgrove Guild, where he was a director, and then at H.H. Martyn & Co. While at the Guild, Gilbert collaborated with Louis Weingartner. When he had moved over to H.H. Martyn, his son, Donald Gilbert, was also employed by the firm, and father and son collaborated on many works. He retired in 1940 and died six years later.

== Background ==
The son of Henry Edward Gilbert and Jane Isabella Gilbert, Walter Gilbert was born on 12 August 1871 in Rugby, Warwickshire. Gilbert and his wife, Ina MacGeoch, had two children. Margot and Donald were both encouraged to pursue artistic careers and both assisted their father on the Queen Mary's interior decoration in the 1930s. Donald worked with his father on many commissions.

== Education ==
Gilbert had an educational career that spanned western Europe, India and the United States. First, and under Benjamin Creswick, Gilbert studied at the Birmingham Municipal School of Art and from 1890 to 1893 at the then National Art Training School. Having completed his studies at these two schools, Gilbert sought out training around the world: in India, the United States, Belgium, France and Germany.

== Career ==
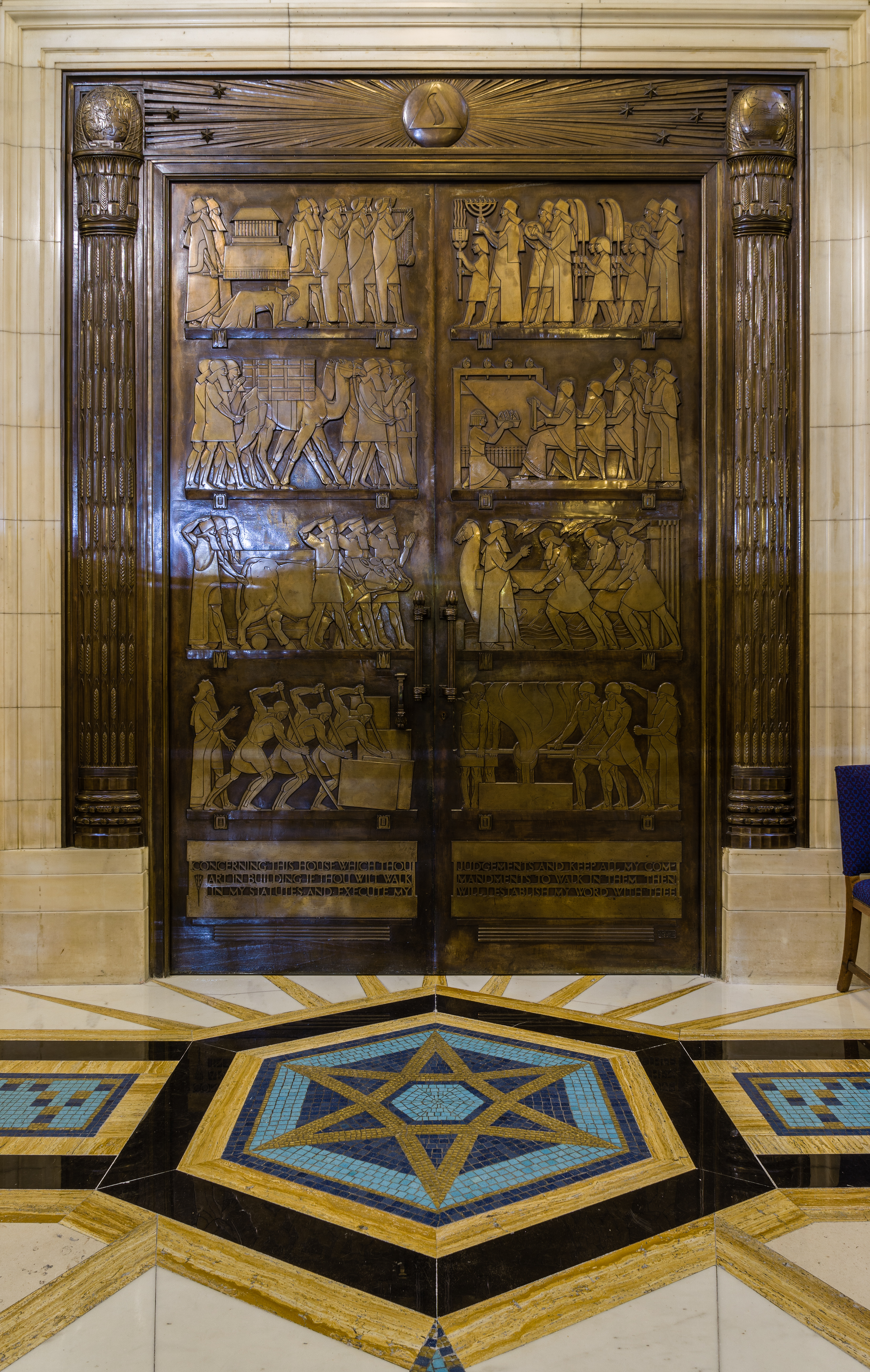
Freemasons' Hall's Grand Temple bronze doors

In 1891 he was drawing master at Rugby School and was then an instructor and headmaster at Bromsgrove School in Worcestershire from 1898 to 1900. In 1898 he co-founded the Bromsgrove Guild with William Whitehouse and the Birmingham architectural firm, Crouch and Butler. From the early 1900s Gilbert often worked in partnership with Swiss modeller Louis Weingartner (Note: Weingartner was Swiss and from Lake Lucerne and an accomplished modeller. He was a jeweller at the School of Art in Birmingham and moved to Bromsgrove in around 1903. He left the Bromsgrove Guild with Gilbert in around 1921. He returned to Lucerne in Switzerland in 1930 and died in 1934.) on commissions for art metal work.

Their collaborations included, among others:

- Liverpool Cathedral reredos for Giles Gilbert Scott
- Masonic Peace Memorial's Grand Temple gates for architects Winston Newman and H. V. Ashley
- Victoria Memorial and Buckingham Palace gates for Sir Aston Webb

Gilbert was director of the Guild from 1899 until 1918, (Note: Per Phillip Medhurst: "Somewhat surprisingly Gilbert was only ejected from the company of his Bromsgrove employers in 1922 when it became apparent that he was using his Guild expenses to obtain orders for Martyn’s." In addition to providing potential motivation for the move, this contradicts the dates of employment from the Mapping the Practice and Profession of Sculpture in Britain and Ireland 1851-1951.) then he went to H.H. Martyn where until 1940 he was assistant manager. Weingartner ceased working at the Bromsgrove Guild about the same time as Gilbert. Donald Gilbert became a modeller for H.H. Martyn, collaborating on works with his father.

In the mid-1920s, Walter Gilbert designed screens with figures representing the signs of the zodiac for the Selfridges department store on Oxford Street, London. His cast bronze storm doors for St. Andrew's House in Edinburgh (1939) depict in low relief the Divine Call to St. Andrew, who is flanked by St. Ninian, St. Kentigern and St. Magnus.

Gilbert participated in many exhibitions including those at the Walker Art Gallery in Liverpool in 1884 and Leeds City Art Gallery in 1902 and 1906. He also involved himself with garden furnishings and the design of glass. He retired in 1940.

== Later years ==
On 23 January 1946 at Littlehampton, Sussex, Gilbert died. St Mary the Virgin, Hanbury, Worcestershire has a memorial that Donald created in memory of his father and Weingartner.

== Gallery ==
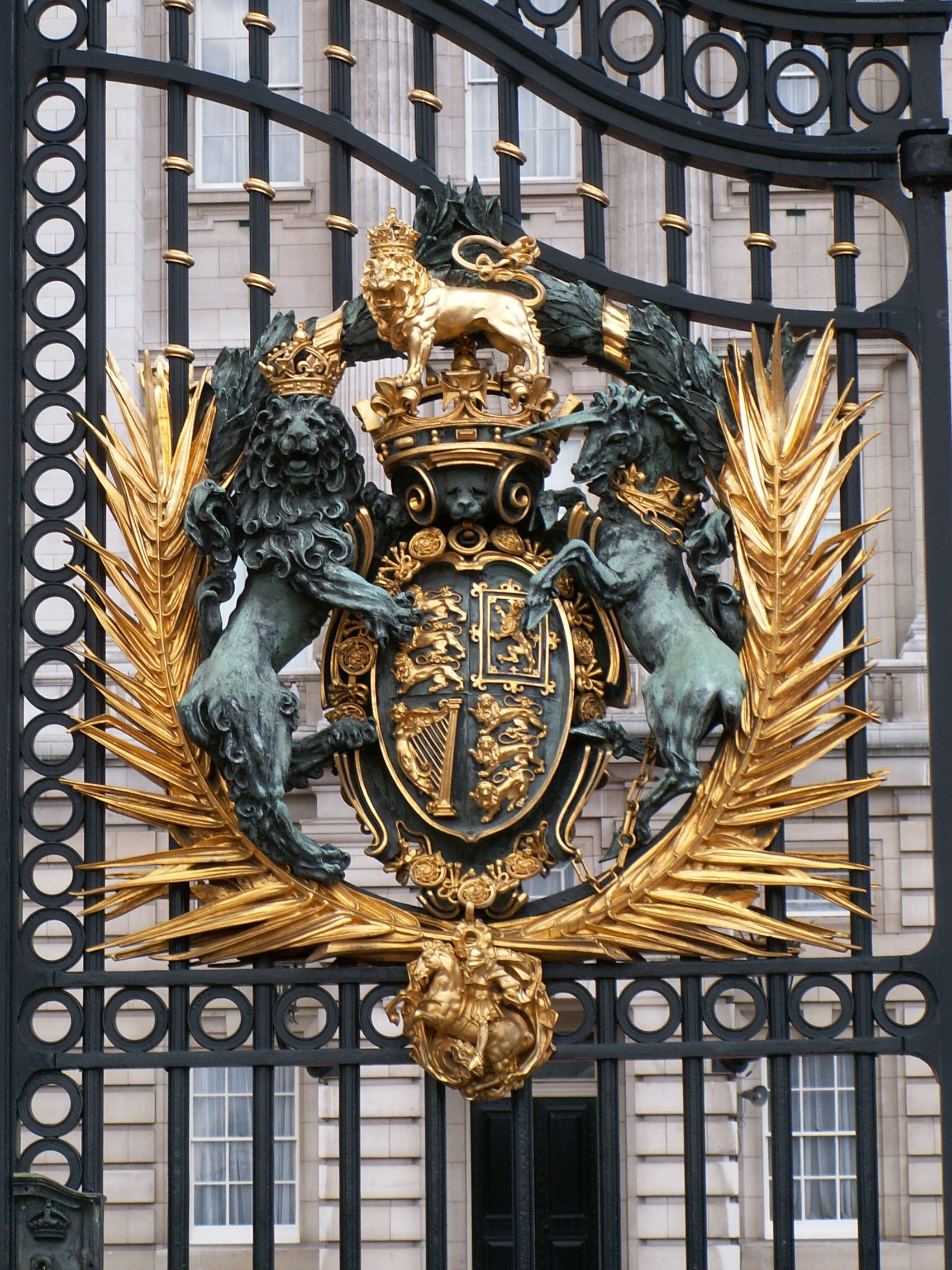
Buckingham Palace Gates

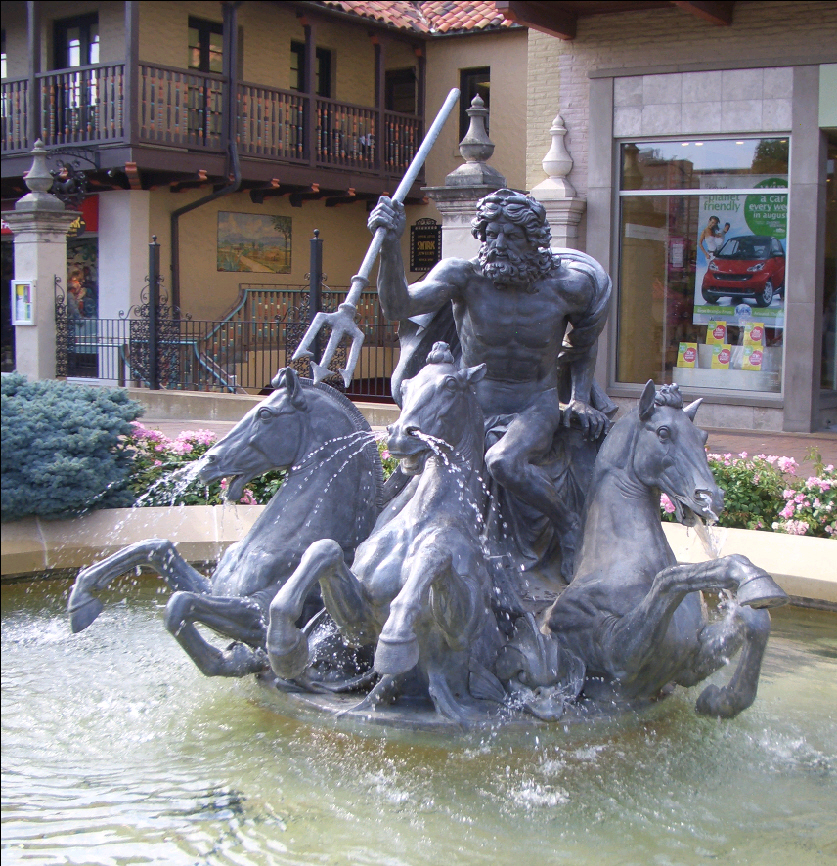
Neptune and his horses fountain, Kansas City, MO

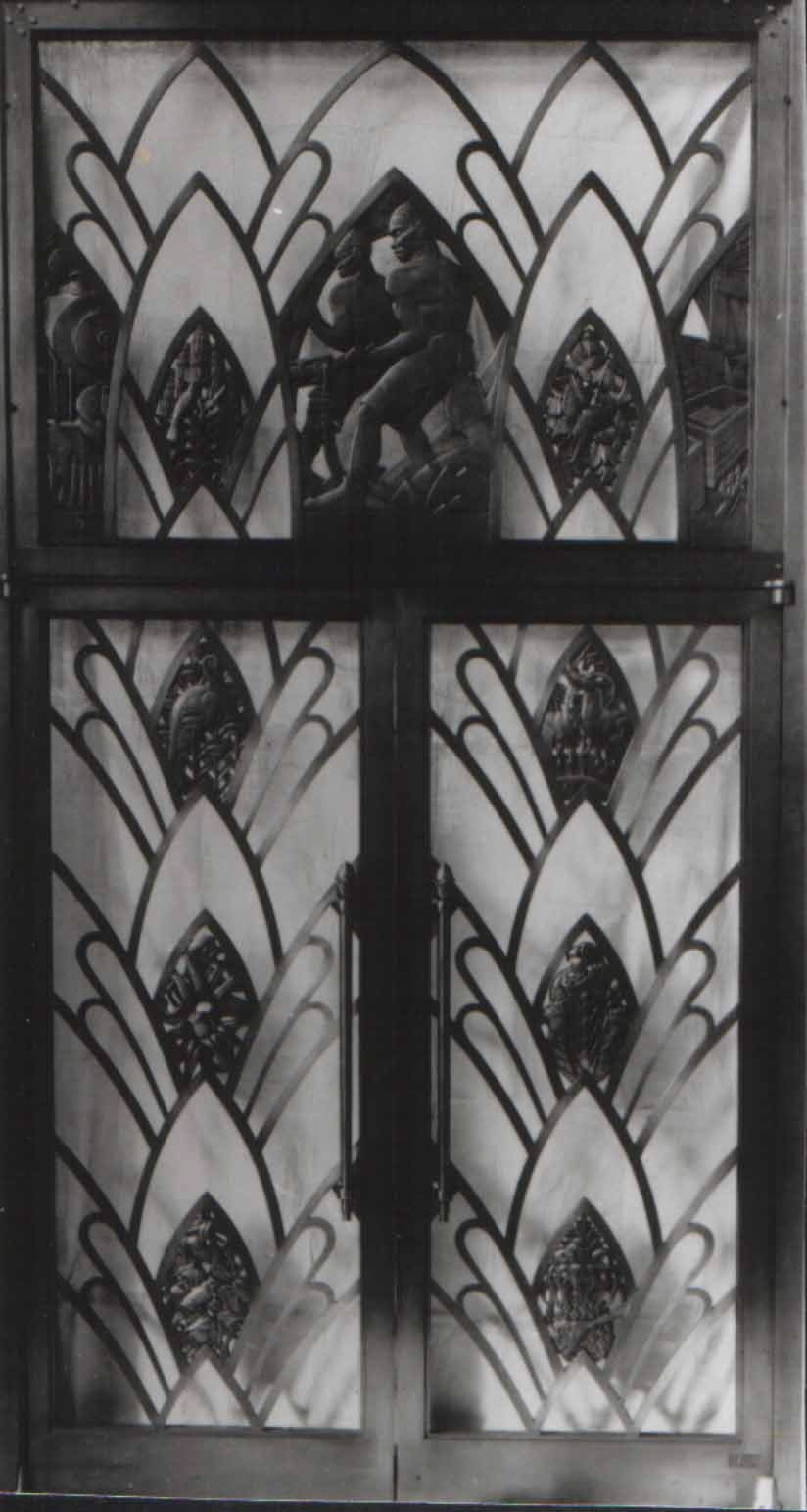
Bronze doors, Anglo-American Corporation, Johannesburg

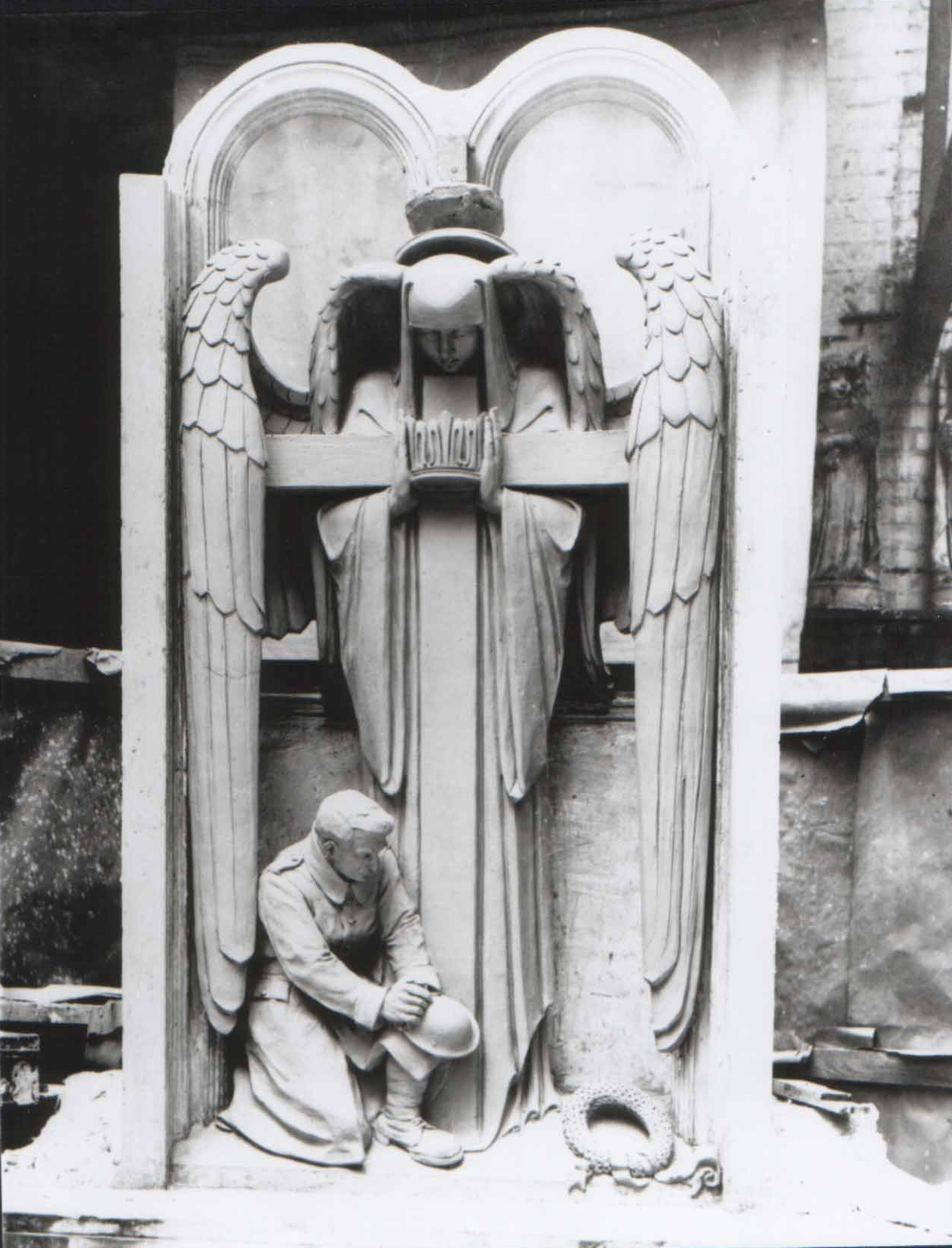
55th Division Memorial, Anglican Cathedral, Liverpool.
