= RMS Empress of Japan =

RMS Empress of Japan may refer to the following ships:

- RMS Empress of Japan (1890), operated by Canadian Pacific Steamships 1891–1922.
- RMS Empress of Japan (1929), operated by Canadian Pacific Steamships 1930–1942.

== See also ==
- Empress of Japan
