= H. H. Martyn & Co. =

English wood and stone carving company

- Type: Private
- Industry: Architectural carving
- Founded: 1888; 138 years ago in Cheltenham
- Founder: Herbert Henry Martyn
- Defunct: 1971
- Fate: Dissolved

H. H. Martyn & Co was a wood and stone carving company based in Cheltenham, England. It provided a service for architects and grew to employ more than a thousand people. It decorated the interiors of many famous ocean liners. During the First World War it diversified into aircraft production and was responsible for the establishment of Gloster Aircraft Company. In 1934 the company was sold to Maple & Co.. It continued to win prestigious contracts both before and after the Second World War. At a time of declining demand, the company closed in 1971.

== History ==
In 1874, Herbert Henry Martyn (1842–1937) left his employer and set up in business with a stonemason colleague. During his lifetime his company grew to employ more than a thousand people. He left because he resented the injustice of his employer in ascribing some of his work to others. Martyn had grown up in poverty but became a skilled craftsman specialising in wood and stone carving with an extensive experience of working in churches and carving memorials and gravestones. In 1888 the company was established as an association of art craftsmen. Together with his business partner Alfred Jeffrey Ems he worked on several churches. In 1900 he established a limited company. At this time, at the age of 30, his son Alfred Willie Martyn (A. W.) was made managing director. A. W.'s goal was to provide a complete service for architects. By then the company had diversified into decorative plaster work, joinery, cabinet making, wrought iron work and casting in bronze and gun metal.

Starting in 1909 with the SS Orvieto and her sister ship SS Otranto, the company took on interior fitting and furnishing work for passenger ships, including the RMS Lusitania and the SS Empress of Asia.

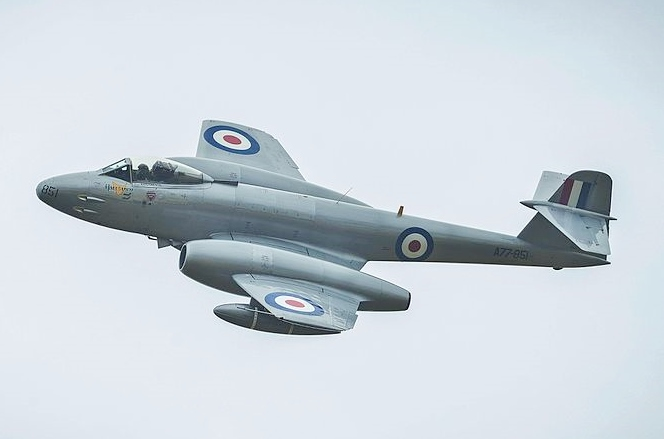
A Gloster Meteor

After the outbreak of the First World War, A. W. investigated the possibility of involving the company in the production of wooden airframes, and soon they were active in making fuselages and wings for a variety of aircraft. Much of the work was carried out by women. In 1917 the Gloucestershire Aircraft Company (later known as Gloster Aircraft) was established.

The period immediately after the war proved difficult for the company, but they were fortunate to obtain a contract for the extension of the Lalbagh Palace in India. In the years following the war, commemoration proved to be culturally important, and the company was involved in the creation of many war memorials, including the Cenotaph in Whitehall.

A. W. resigned from the board of both H. H. Martyn and Gloster Aircraft in 1927 after "acute differences of opinion with several of the board members", and in 1934 the business was sold to Maples of London.

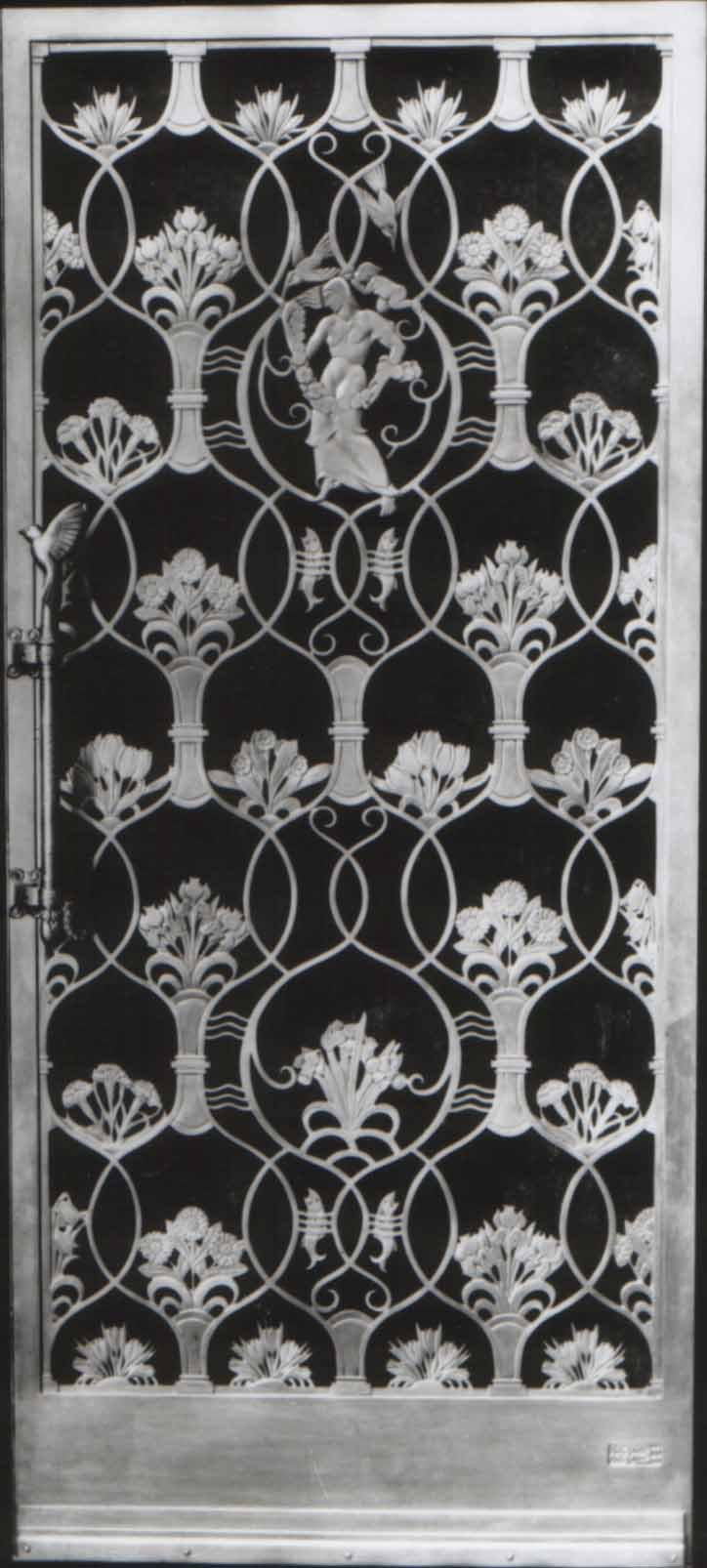
RMS Queen Mary. Private dining room door. 1934

Despite the lack of family involvement, many aspects of the business continued to flourish in the following years, although the depression in the 1930s took its toll. Among many other liners, both the Queen Mary and the Queen Elizabeth contained furniture and fittings from Martyns. Numerous decorative contracts ranged from royal commissions to public buildings, universities, cathedrals, offices, country houses and banks, hotels, cinemas, shops and theatres. During the 1930s the Corinthian capitals above the entrance to the Geological Museum, now part of the Science Museum, were carved by Martyns, and they also built the bronze main entrance and the aluminium bronze screens to the reading room for Cambridge University Library. As part of the reconstruction of the Bank of England the bronze figure of Ariel on the dome by Charles Wheeler was cast by Martyns.

Although the Martyns Sunningend factory in Cheltenham was no longer suitable for constructing aircraft in the Second World War, it was involved in the construction of Airspeed Horsa gliders.

After the war, the task of commemoration of the fallen largely consisted of adding panels to existing memorials, but in the case of the Commandos this was not possible, because they were only established in June 1940. The Commando Memorial was created by Scott Sutherland, cast by Martyns, and unveiled by the Queen Mother in 1952. Other notable statues cast by Martyns include the statue of Sir Winston Churchill in the Guildhall, London by Oscar Nemon and the equestrian statue of Robert the Bruce, Bannockburn by Pilkington Jackson which was unveiled by the Queen in 1964. The House of Commons of the United Kingdom was destroyed by German bombing during the war. Martyns made the new Speaker's Chair (a gift from Australia, in blackbean wood) and the Dispatch Boxes (a gift from New Zealand, in puriri wood) for the rebuilt Commons chamber. The Table of the House, by contrast, was made by the Globe Furniture Company of Canada.The pulpit and sounding board in St Paul's Cathedral were carved and built by Martyns, and used for the first time on the occasion of the state funeral of Sir Winston Churchill in 1965. Two life-size racehorses by John Skeaping were cast by Martyns, Hyperion in 1962 and Chamossaire in 1966. The statue of Hyperion is now located in the grounds of the National Horse Racing Museum, while that of Chamossaire is in Snailwell.

In the years after the war, shipping companies worked to make good the losses of passenger liners they had incurred. There was also the need to refit liners, such as the Queen Mary, which had been taken over for war service. One particularly notable new ship was the RMS Caronia, for which all the decorative metalwork was provided by Martyns. Later work included the iconic spiral staircase on the SS Canberra, and the provision of panelling, ceilings, and fittings on the QE2.

To meet the needs of their customers, Martyns employed sculptors. Robert Lindsey Clark, who started as an apprentice at Martyns and then studied at Lambeth School of Art. He returned to Martyns before 1901 and became their head of sculpture and art director in about 1905. He exhibited widely and was made a member of the Royal British Society of Sculptors. Walter Gilbert left the Bromsgrove Guild and joined Martyns in October 1918, continuing his prolific output.

Martyns had a sports field consisting of five tennis courts, two football pitches, a cricket ground and a running track. It also had two pavilions, with a bar, recreation and changing rooms. It was an early facility, covenanted to the workforce. In 1971, at a time of declining demand, Maples sold Martyns to a company which closed it down, enabling the latter to profit from the sale of the sports field.

Although the company office was gutted by bombing in 1940, and there was also a purge of material when the factory closed down, a significant collection of material about the company is still available in Gloucestershire Archives.

== Ship contracts ==
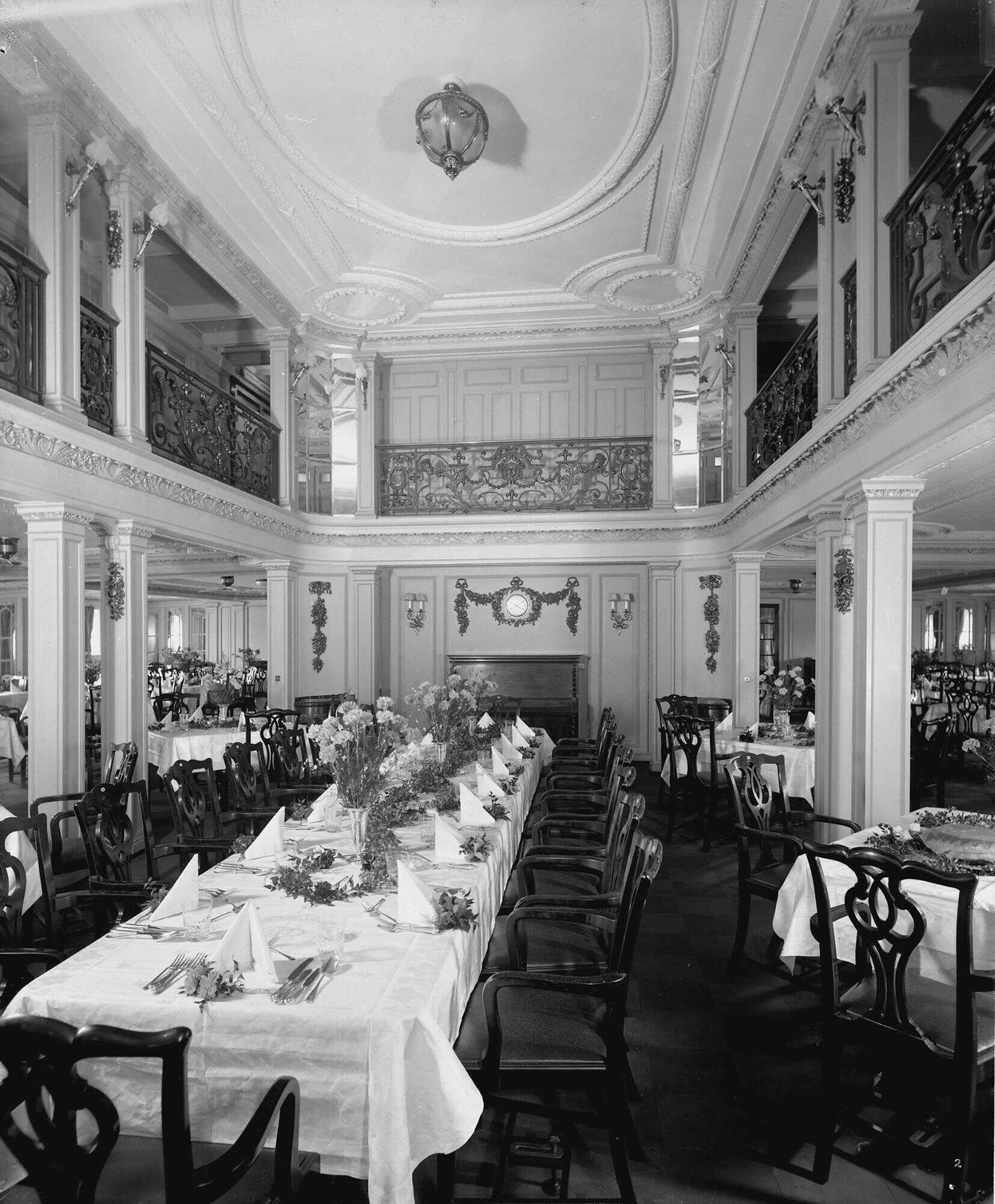
RMS Empress of Asia. Architect: G.A. Crawley. Dining saloon, plaster and iron work.

The following table is derived from Chapter 13 of The Best, and is intended to illustrate the scope of the work carried out by Martyns on ocean liners. As the author admits:

Although Martyns ship work contracts were probably its most extensive activity, and incorporated some of its finest work, research has proved to be difficult because of the short life of many of the ships owing to the war, and also because few records survive. In many cases, even where records exist, only the architect, and not the company or the men producing the work is mentioned.

It is also sad that, although at one time there was an extensive library of photographs showing the work the company had done, it would seem that these too, like many of the ships, have disappeared without trace.

The task of identifying the ships has been further complicated by the fact that ship names were re-used - there were, for example, three ships called the Empress of Britain were built in 1905, 1930 and 1955 respectively. The events of the 20th Century also had an impact on the use of the ships. For example, the Empress of Asia became an armed merchant cruiser in the First World War and a troopship in the Second World War before being sunk by Japanese dive-bombers in 1942.

Name	Year	Company	Work	Architect
Queen Elizabeth 2	1969	Cunard Line	Panelling, Ceilings and all the Fittings in the after part of the ship	unknown
Ivernia	1955	Cunard Line	unknown	unknown
Saxonia	1954	Cunard Line	unknown	unknown
Caronia	1947	Cunard Line	All metal work	unknown
Queen Elizabeth	1938	Cunard Line	Staircases, Foyers and Entrances	G.Grey Wornum FRIBA
Queen Mary	1936	Cunard Line	Staircases, Foyers and Entrances	Mews & Davis
Lusitania	1906	Cunard Line	Some public rooms - probably during a refit	James Millar
Cameronia	1920	Anchor Line	Public rooms	unknown
Lancastria	1920	Anchor Line	Public rooms	unknown
Empress of Canada	1960	Canadian Pacific	Windsor Lounge and the Canada Room	unknown
Empress of Britain	1930	Canadian Pacific	First Class Public Rooms, Foyers and Entrances	P.A. Staynes ROI & A.H. Jones FRIBA
Empress of Japan	1929	Canadian Pacific	First Class Public Rooms, Foyers and Entrances	P.A. Staynes ROI & A.H. Jones FRIBA
Empress of Russia	1912	Canadian Pacific	First Class Public Rooms, Smoking Room of Jacobean Character	unknown
Empress of Asia	1912	Canadian Pacific	Dining saloon, Plaster and Wrought Iron Work, Sussex Room	G.A. Crawley
Empress of Scotland	1906	Canadian Pacific	Dining saloon, possibly more but no documentation	P.A. Staynes ROI & A.H. Jones FRIBA
Duchess of Bedford	1928	Canadian Pacific	First Class Public Rooms, Foyers and Entrances	P.A. Staynes ROI & A.H. Jones FRIBA
Duchess of York	1928	Canadian Pacific	First Class Public Rooms	unknown
Duchess of Richmond	1928	Canadian Pacific	First Class Public Rooms, Foyers and Entrances	P.A. Staynes ROI & A.H. Jones FRIBA
Duchess of Atholl	1927	Canadian Pacific	First Class Public Rooms, Foyers and Entrances	P.A. Staynes ROI & A.H. Jones FRIBA
Princess Marguerite	1924	Canadian Pacific	First Class Public Rooms	unknown
Princess Kathleen	1924	Canadian Pacific	First Class Public Rooms	unknown
Monarch of Bermuda	1931	Furness Withy	Smoking Room, Writing Rooms, Library, Lounge, Wing Cafes, Verandah Cafe, Midship Entrances, Sun and 'A' Decks, Forward Entrances and Gymnasium	A. McInnes, Gardner and Partners
Queen of Bermuda	1931	Furness Withy	First Class Public Rooms	A. McInnes, Gardner and Partners
Western Prince	1929	Furness Withy	Main Stairway, Smoking Room, and probably more, but no documentation	A. McInnes, Gardner and Partners
Lady Nelson	1928	Canadian National	First Class Public Rooms, Foyers and Entrances	Robert Whyte
Lady Drake	1928	Canadian National	First Class Public Rooms, Foyers and Entrances	Robert Whyte
Lady Hawkins	1928	Canadian National	First Class Public Rooms, Foyers and Entrances	Robert Whyte
Lady Rodney	1929	Canadian National	First Class Public Rooms, Foyers and Entrances	Robert Whyte
Canberra	1961	P&O	First Class Entrance Halls and Stairways, Spiral Staircase	Casson Conder Partnership
Maloja	1911	P&O	First Class Public Rooms	unknown
Orama	1924	Orient Line	First Class Public Rooms, Foyers, Staircase, and Entrances	A.N. Prentice FRIBA
Oronsay	1924	Orient Line	First Class Public Rooms, Foyers, Staircase, and Entrances	A.N. Prentice FRIBA
Orontes	1929	Orient Line	First Class Public Rooms, Foyers, Staircase, and Entrances	A.N. Prentice FRIBA
Otranto	1925	Orient Line	First Class Public Rooms, Foyers, Staircase, and Entrances	A.N. Prentice FRIBA
Orford	1928	Orient Line	First Class Public Rooms, Foyers, Staircase, and Entrances	A.N. Prentice FRIBA
Orcades	1936	Orient Line	First Class Public Rooms, Foyers and Entrances	Brian O'Rorke MA, FRIBA
Orion	1934	Orient Line	Cabins de Luxe, Tourist Class Public Rooms, Entrances and Staircases	Brian O'Rorke MA, FRIBA
Ormonde	1917	Orient Line	First Class Public Rooms, Foyers, Staircase, and Entrances	A.N. Prentice FRIBA
Orvieto	1909	Orient Line	Public Rooms - ceilings and columns	A.N. Prentice FRIBA
Indarra	1909	Australasian United	First-Class Public Rooms	unknown
Rangitane	1929	New Zealand Shipping	First-Class Public Rooms	unknown
Rangitata	1929	New Zealand Shipping	First-Class Public Rooms	unknown
Vauban	1912	Lamport and Holt	First Class Public Rooms	unknown
Vandyck	1906	Lamport and Holt	Public rooms	unknown
Northern Star	1962	Shaw, Savill & Albion Line	unknown	unknown
Gothic	1947	Shaw, Savill & Albion Line	Nickel Silverwork on Staircase - possibly more	unknown
Vulcania	1926	Cosulich Line	First Class Public Rooms	unknown
SS Príncipe Perfeito	1961	Companhia Nacional de Navegação	Numerous Public Rooms and the Swimming Baths	unknown

== War memorials ==
The following table has been gleaned from The Best. Given the company's origins, it was natural that it would apply its skills to the task of creating the many memorials that were needed after the First World War. Relatively few new memorials were created after the Second World War, but existing ones were extended to commemorate the fallen.

Name	Heritage Link	Work	Address
Ayr Royal Scots Fusiliers Memorial	Ayr Royal Scots Fusiliers War Memorial	Sculpted by C. d'O. Pilkington Jackson, cast by Martyns, unveiled on 12 June 1960	Place De Saint-Germain-En-Laye, Between Bath Place and Pavilion Road, Ayr, Scotland
Bradford War Memorial	Bradford War Memorial	Bronze sculpted figures by Martyns can plausibly be attributed to Robert Lindsey Clark	Prince's Way, Bradford, West Yorkshire, BD5 0BQ, England
Cambridge American Cemetery and Memorial	Cambridge American Cemetery	The base and the top of the flagpole were cast by Martyns	Madingley Road, Coton, CB23 7PH, Cambridge, United Kingdom
Cheltenham, St Peter's Church War Memorial	Cheltenham, St Peter's Church War Memorial	Cross of local stone, bronze laurel wreath	St Peter's Churchyard, Tewkesbury Road, Cheltenham, Gloucestershire, GL51 9AH, England
Crewe War Memorial	Crewe War Memorial	The bronze statue was sculpted by Walter Gilbert and cast by Martyns	Prince Albert Street, Crewe, Cheshire CW1 2DF
Black Watch Memorial, Powrie Brae	Dundee, Black Watch Memorial	Memorial to all ranks of the Dundee and Angus battalions of the Black Watch who died in the Second World War, created by Scott Sutherland, cast by Martyns. Unveiled on 15 October 1959	Emmock Rd, Dundee, DD4 9RA, Scotland
Fleetwood Memorial Park Gate	Fleetwood Memorial Park Gate	Park planned by Sir Leslie Patrick Abercrombie RIBA; Gates for park by Martyns	Park Avenue, Fleetwood, Lancashire, FY7 6TP, England
Gloucester War Memorial	Gloucester War Memorial	The bronze figure on the top of the memorial and the panel on the side were made by Martyns.	The Park, Park Road, Gloucester, Gloucestershire, GL1 1LF
Eccleston, St Helens War Memorial	West Derby War Memorial	Created by Walter Gilbert and Louis Weingarner at Martyns	Junction of St Helens Road and Burrow's Lane, Eccleston Lane Ends, Prescot, Liverpool, L34 6JN
West Hartlepool War Memorial	West Hartlepool War Memorial	Design by George J. Coombs, Aberdeen. Granite and bronze	Victory Square, Victoria Road, Hartlepool, County Durham, England
Exchange Flags War Memorial	Liverpool Exchange Flags War Memorial	The memorial was cast by Martyns	9 Exchange Flags, Liverpool, L2 3YL
Lower Slaughter War Memorial	Lower Slaughter War Memorial	Erected in 1920 by Martyns	In the churchyard of St Mary's Church, Lower Slaughter, Cotswold, Gloucestershire
The Cenotaph	London, The Cenotaph	Designed by Sir Edwin Lutyens, carved by Martyns	Whitehall, Westminster, London SW1A 2ET
City War Memorial, Nottingham	Nottingham, War Memorial	The wrought iron gates for the memorial were designed by T. Wallis-Gordon and constructed by Martyns	Nottingham War Memorial Gardens, Victoria Embankment, Nottingham NG2 2LA
Pelton Fell Cenotaph	Pelton Fell Cenotaph and memorial gates	Gates by Martyns	Pelton Fell Memorial Park, Station Lane, Pelton Fell, Chester-le-Street, County Durham, DH2 2RL, England
Smethwick War Memorial	Smethwick War Memorial	Stone column, bronze figure and panels, Made by Martyns	Victoria Park, Sandwell, West Midlands, England
Commando Memorial	Spean Bridge, Commando Memorial	Memorial to the officers and men of the Commandos who died in the Second World War, created by Scott Sutherland and cast by Martyns. Unveiled on 27 September 1952	A82 (Fort William to Inverness), Spean Bridge, PH34 4EN, Scotland
Troon War Memorial	Troon, South Beach Esplanade, War Memorial	Created by Martyns	South Beach Esplanade, Troon, KA10 6EJ, Scotland
Walsall War Memorial	Walsall War Memorial	Limestone column, made by Martyns	Bradford Place, Walsall, West Midlands, England

== Architectural work and sculpture ==
The following table lists some of the many works described in The Best. It is not intended to be comprehensive.

Name	Heritage Link	Work	Address
Equestrian statue of Robert the Bruce, Bannockburn	Bannockburn, Equestrian Statue	Sculpted by C. d'O. Pilkington Jackson, cast by Martyns	Glasgow Road, Whins of Milton, Stirling, FK7 0LJ
Besford, Church of St Peter	Besford, Church of Saint Peter	H.H. Martyn executed the carved work in connection with the restoration in 1881, together with his partner A.J. Emms.	Besford, Wychavon, Worcestershire Worcestershire
Cambridge University Library	University Library	The bronze main entrance and the screens to the reading room were manufactured by Martyns	Cambridge University Library, West Road, Cambridge, CB3 9DR, UK
Victoria Square, Birmingham Statue of Queen Victoria	Birmingham Town Hall, Statue of Queen Victoria	The bronze statue outside the town hall is a replacement for one which had weathered badly.	Victoria Square, Birmingham, B3, England
Cheltenham Church of St Stephen	Cheltenham, Church of St Stephen	H.H. Martyn, in partnership with Alfred Jeffrey Emms, carried out carving work on the nave and stalls	42 St Stephen's Rd, Cheltenham GL51 3AB
Colchester Castle Park Entrance Gate	Castle Park Entrance	The wrought iron gates at the entrance on Cowdray Crescent were created by Martyns	Colchester Castle, Castle Park, Colchester, CO1 1TJ
Inverforth Gate Grovelands Park	Grovelands Park, Inverforth Gate	The gate was created by Martyns	Grovelands Park, The Bourne, Southgate London, N14 6RA
Hognaston, St Bartholemew's	Hognaston, St. Bartholemew's	The stained-glass windows in the church were made by Martyns	St Bartholemew's, Stonepit Lane, Hognaston, Ashbourne, DE6 1PR
Freemasons' Hall, London	London, Freemasons Hall	the great bronze doors and the masonic shrine were cast by Martyns	60 Great Queen Street, London WC2B 5AZ
Bank of England	London, Bank of England	The figure of Ariel on the dome of the building was made by Martyns.	Threadneedle Street, London, EC2R 8AH
House of Commons of the United Kingdom	London, Houses of Parliament	The speaker's chair, the despatch boxes and the table on which they stand were made by Martyns.	House of Commons London SW1A 0AA
India Buildings	Liverpool, India Buildings	Decorative plaster ceilings and bronze entrance doors were created by Martyns	Walter St, Liverpool, L2 0RR
National Horseracing Museum	Newmarket, National Horse Racing Museum	The sculpture of Hyperion, winner of the 1933 Derby was sculpted by Professor John Skeaping and cast by Martyns in 1962. It is now located in the grounds of the museum. A statue of Chamossaire which was cast by Martyns in 1966 is in Snailwell.	Palace House Palace Street, Newmarket CB8 8EP
Balliol College, Oxford	Oxford, Balliol College	Woodcarving and panelling for the hall were carried out by Martyns.]	Broad Street, Oxford, OX1 3BJ
Swindon Civic Offices	Swindon Civic Offices	Metalwork by HH Martyn	Euclid Street, Swindon, SN1 2JH, England
Thornton Manor	Thornton Manor	Music room: panelling, glazing, carving	Manor Road, Wirral, CH63 1JB, England

== See also ==
- Re Denley's Trust Deed, 1969 English trusts law case, concerning the company sportsground
- Plymouth Naval Memorial
- Ullet Road Unitarian Church
